= Romanian pavilion =

Venice Biennale national pavilion

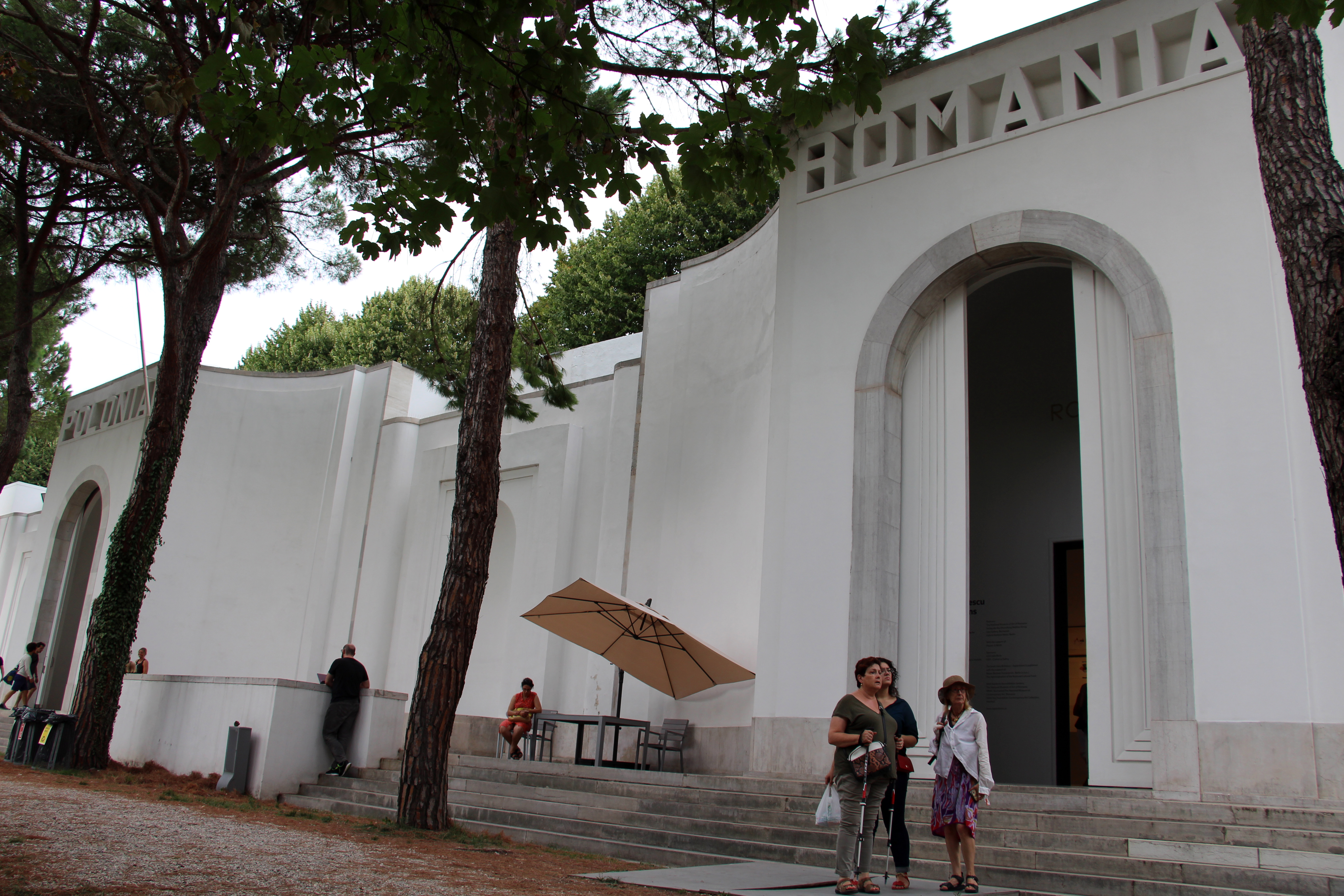
Romanian pavilion, Venice Biennale 2017

The Romanian pavilion houses Romania's national representation during the Venice Biennale arts festivals.

== Background ==
The Venice Biennale is an international art biennial exhibition held in Venice, Italy. Often described as "the Olympics of the art world", participation in the Biennale is a prestigious event for contemporary artists. The festival has become a constellation of shows: a central exhibition curated by that year's artistic director, national pavilions hosted by individual nations, and independent exhibitions held throughout Venice. The Biennale's parent organisation also runs regular festivals in other arts: architecture, dance, film, music and theatre.

Outside the central international exhibition, individual nations produce their own shows, known as pavilions, as their national representation. Nations that own their pavilion buildings – such as the 30 housed in the Giardini – are responsible for their own upkeep and construction costs as well. Nations without dedicated buildings create pavilions in venues throughout the city.

== Organization and building ==
The pavilion was designed by Brenno Del Giudice in 1932 and built by 1938 as part of a complex on the Giardini's Sant'Elena Island. The buildings, originally allocated to Sweden and Greece, were respectively transferred to Yugoslavia and Romania.

The interior was planned under the attention of Nicolae Iorga. It was initially designed as an art salon with three rooms (the main, tall show room being flanked by two smaller ones) and it stayed like that until 1962, when the walls were demolished, uniting the three rooms into one single salon. The initial architecture was recreated in 2015, albeit temporarily, by architect Attila Kim for Adrian Ghenie's Darwin's Room. Since 1997, the Romanian Institute for Culture and Research in Humanities (also known as Casa Romena di Venezia, based in Palazzo Correr) has hosted intermittently parallel exhibitions representing Romania at the Venice Biennale.

== Representation by year ==
=== Art ===
- 1907 — First participation of a Romanian artist in the Venice Biennale: Frederic Storck
- 1924 — Central Pavilion, Rooms XIX and XX. Group exhibition. Paintings by Ion Andreescu, Marius Bunescu, Cecilia Cuțescu-Storck, Niculina Delavrancea-Dona, Ștefan Dimitrescu, Dumitru Ghiață, Lucian Grigorescu, Nicolae Grigorescu, Doru I. Ionescu, Kimon Loghi, Ștefan Luchian, Samuel Mützner, Rodica Maniu, G. Marinescu-Vâlsan, George Demetrescu Mirea, G. Moscu, Theodor Pallady, George Petrașcu, Costin Petrescu, Ștefan Popescu, Camil Ressu, Jean Al. Steriadi, Eustațiu Stoenescu, Ipolit Strâmbu, Nicolae Tonitza, Nicolae Vermont, Arthur Verona. Sculptures by: Constantin Brâncuși, Oscar Han, Ion Jalea, Cornel Medrea, D.D. Mirea, Dimitrie Paciurea, (Talpoșin Alexandru) Severin, Oscar Spaethe, Frederic Storck. General Commissioner for Romania: Gian Battista Bombardella. Organizing Artistic Committee: A.G. Verona and I.D. Ștefănescu.
- 1938 — Official inauguration of the Romanian Pavilion. Organizer and commissioner: Nicolae Iorga. Paintings by Georghe Petrașcu, Ștefan Popescu, Eustațiu Stoenescu, Ion Theodorescu-Sion; sculptures by Oscar Han, Ion Jalea, Cornel Medrea. Romania was also represented by Ion Andreescu and Nicolae Grigorescu in the International Exhibition of 19th Century Landscape Painting hosted by the Italian Pavilion.
- 1940 — Paintings by Nicolae Dărăscu, Lucian Grigorescu, Theodor Pallady, Jean Al. Steriadi; sculptures by Céline Emilian, Mihai Onofrei (including a sculpture of King Carol II of Romania). Organizer and commissioner: Nicolae Iorga.
- 1942 — Group exhibition of paintings by Marius Bunescu, Henri Catargi, Ștefan Constantinescu, Cecilia Cuțescu-Storck, Horia Damian, Nicolae Dărăscu, Dumitru Ghiață, Lucian Grigorescu, Rodica Maniu, Paul Miracovici, Alexandru Padina, Theodor Pallady, George Petrașcu, Ștefan Popescu, Camil Ressu, Jean Al. Steriadi, Eustațiu Stoenescu, Nicolae Stoica, Ion Țuculescu, Gheorghe Vânătoru, A.G. Verona. Sculptures by Zoe Băicoianu, Alexandru Călinescu, Mac Constantinescu, Oscar Han, Ion Irimescu, Ion Jalea, Corneliu Medrea, Militza Petrașcu, Ion Grigore Popovici, Fritz Storck. Including sculptures of Marshall Ion Antonescu and King Michael of Romania. Organized by the Ministry of National Propaganda; Commissioner: Jean Al. Steriadi.
- 1954 — Group exhibition of Socialist Realism. Paintings by Lidia Agricola, Octavian Angheluță, Paul Atanasiu, Corneliu Baba, Ștefan Barabaș, Marius Bunescu, Alexandru Ciucurencu, Gheorghe Glauber, Lucian Grigorescu, Dan Hatmanu, Iosif Iser, Gheorghe Labin, Max Herman Maxy, Gavril Miklossy, Alexandru Moscu, Ion Panteli Stanciu, Camil Ressu, Mimi Maxy-Șaraga, Gheorghe Șaru, Jean Al. Steriadi. Sculptures by Gheorghe Anghel, Constantin Baraschi, Marius Traian Butunoiu, Boris Caragea, Iosif Fekete, Octav Iiescu, Ion Irimescu, Martin Izsak, Ion Jalea, Ernest Kaznovski, Egon Löwith, Constantin Lucaci, Sándor Puskás, Artur Vetro, Ion Vlad, Mihail Wagner, Lelia Zuaf. Watercolors and black and white sketches by Zoltán Andrássy, Maria Constantin, Marcela Cordescu, Gheorghe Ivancenco, Aurel Jiquidi, Vasile Kazar, Ligia Macovei, Jules Perahim, Noël Florin Roni, Jean Al. Steriadi, Béla Gy. Szabó, Walter Widmann. Organizer and commissioner: Jules Perahim (Secretary of the Union of Fine Artists – UAP Bucharest).
- 1956 — Group exhibition. Paintings by Corneliu Baba, Alexandru Ciucurencu. Sculptures by Ion Irimescu, Cornel Medrea. Drawings by Ligia Macovei, Jules Perahim. Organizing Commissioner: Paraschiva Pojar (State Committee for Literature and Art), Ion Irimescu (Eminent Master of Arts in the Popular Republic of Romania, Secretary of the Union of Fine Artists – UAP, laureate of the State Prize).
- 1958 — Group exhibition. Paintings by Henri Catargi, Dumitru Ghiață, Ștefan Szönyi. Sculptures by Ion Jalea, Gheza Vida. Black and white drawings by Vasile Kazar, Mariana Petrașcu. Commissioners: Jules Perahim and Ligia Macovei.
- 1960 — Group exhibition. Paintings by George Petrașcu. Drawings and engravings by Gheorghe Adoc, Zoltan Andrássy, Corina Beiu Angheluță, Gheorghe Boțan, Geta Brătescu, Eva Cerbu, Marcel Chirnoagă, Ștefan Constantinescu, Cornelia Daneț, Vasile Dobrian, Emilia Dumitrescu, Ana Iliuț, Gheorghe Ivancenco, Puia Hortensia Masichievici, Natalia Matei, Iosif Mátyás, Gheorghe Naum, Nicolae Iulian Olariu, Marcel Olinescu, Jules Perahim, Eugen Popa, Victor Silvester, Béla Gy Szabó, Gheorghe Șaru, Traian Vasai. Commissioner: Jules Perahim.
- 1962 — Group exhibition. Paintings by Brăduț Covaliu. Sculptures by Ion Vlad. Drawings by Vasile Dobrian, Paul Erdős. Commissioner: Jules Perahim.
- 1964 — Group exhibition. Paintings by Ion Bițan, Ion Gheorghiu, Ion Pacea. Sculptures by Boris Caragea. Commissioner: Mircea Deac (Secretary of the Council for Arts from the State Committee for Culture and Arts of the Popular Republic of Romania).
- 1966 — Ion Țuculescu retrospective. Commissioner: Petru Comarnescu.
- 1968 — Group exhibition. Virgil Almășanu (painting), Octav Grigorescu (drawing), Ovidiu Maitec (sculpture). Commissioner: Ion Frunzetti.
- 1970 — Group exhibition. Henri Mavrodin, Ion Sălișteanu (painting), George Apostu (sculpture), Marcel Chirnoagă (graphics), Ritzi-Victoria and Peter Jacobi (decorative arts). Commissioner: Ion Frunzetti (Vicepresident of the Union of Fine Artists – UAP).
- 1972 — Group exhibition (graphics) — Etching in the Contemporary Space (Grafica în spațiul contemporan). General theme: Work of Art or Behaviour (Opera sau comportamentul). Graphics by Anna Maria Andronescu, Marcel Chirnoagă, Dumitru Cionca, Ioan Donca, Adrian Dumitrache, Mircea Dumitrescu, Dan Erceanu, Sergiu Georgescu, Harry Guttmann, Th. Valentin Ionescu, George Leolea, Wanda Mihuleac, Tiberiu Nicorescu, Ion Panaitescu, Anton Perussi, Ion State, Theodora Stendl Moisescu, Ion Stendl, Radu Stoica, Iosif Teodorescu. Sculptures by Gheorghe Iliescu Călinești, Mircea Ștefănescu. Commissioner: Ion Frunzetti (President of the Art and Literature Theory and History Section of the Social Sciences Academy). Deputy Commissioner: Valentin Ionescu.
- 1976 — Group exhibition: The Ambient as a Social Problem. Sculpture (works and photos): Gheza Vida, Ion Vlasiu, Constantin Lucaci, Constantin Popovici, Grigore Minea, George Apostu, Petre (Nicăpetre) Bălănică, Aurelian Bolea, Cristian Breazu, Mihai Buculei, Florin Codre, Napoleon Tiron, Silvia Radu, Ion Condiescu. Photographic aspects – ambient: Vlad Florescu, Ion Condiescu, Eugen Petraș, Anton Eberwein. Commissioner: Ion Frunzetti.
- 1978 — Group exhibition: From Nature to Art, from Art to Nature. Paintings by Sorin Ilfoveanu, Iacob Lazăr, Viorel Mărginean, Horia Bernea. Sculptures by Petru Jecza, Octavian Olariu, Alexandru Gheorghiță, Geta Caragiu. Commissioner: Ion Frunzetti.
- 1980 — Art in the Seventies. Sculptures by George Apostu, Horia Bernea, Octav Grigorescu, Constantin Lucaci, Ovidiu Maitec. Commissioner: Ion Frunzetti.
- 1982 — Hommage to Brancusi in the Central Pavilion (invited commissioner: Dan Hăulică). The Romanian Pavilion exhibited works by Florin Codre, Ion Gheorghiu (commissioner: Ion Frunzetti).
- 1988 — Napoleon Tiron (sculpture). Commissioner: Dan Hăulică.
- 1990 — Mircea Spătaru (sculpture). Commissioner: Dan Hăulică.
- 1993 — Horia Damian. Commissioner: Radu Varia. Deputy commissioner: Coriolan Babeți.
- 1995 — Brancusi's Heritage in Romania in the Romanian Pavilion (Giardini) and in the Romanian Institute for Culture and Research in Humanities (Palazzo Correr). Artists: George Apostu, Ștefan Bertalan, Mihai Buculei, Maria Cocea, Roman Cotoșman, Doru Covrig, Darie Dup, Ovidiu Maitec, Paul Neagu, Ion Nicodim, Neculai Păduraru, Constantin Popovici, Mircea Roman, Napoleon Tiron, Aurel Vlad, Marian Zidaru. Commissioners: Dan Hăulică and Coriolan Babeți.
- 1997 — Ion Bitzan, Teodor Graur, Ion Grigorescu, Iosif Kiraly, Valeriu Mladin, Gheorghe Rasovszky, Sorin Vreme. Commissioner: Dan Hăulică; Deputy Commissioners: Coriolan Babeți, Adrian Guță. Besides the Romanian Pavilion, another exhibition is organized in Casa Romena di Venezia.
- 1999 — subREAL group and Dan Perjovschi (curator: Judit Angel) in the Romanian Pavilion (Giardini). A parallel exhibition was organized in Casa Romena (Palazzo Correr) with works by Alexandru Antik, Mircea Florian, Dan Mihălțianu, Nicolae Onucsan, Alexandru Patatics (curator: Horea Avram). Honorary Commissioner: Dan Hăulică. Deputy Commissioner: Aurora Dediu.
- 2001 — Group exhibition. Video art by Context Network, Gheorghe Rasovszky. Commissioner: Ruxandra Balaci. Curators: Ruxandra Balaci, Sebastian Bertalan, Alexandru Patatics. Deputy commissioner: Raluca Velisar.
- 2003 — Alteridem.exe.2 (new media exhibition) by Kinema Ikon group. Commissioner and curator: Călin Man. Deputy curators: Raluca Velisar, Adela Văetiși. Organized by the National Museum of Contemporary Art Bucharest (MNAC).
- 2005 — Daniel Knorr, European Influenza (curator: Marius Babias)
- 2007 — Victor Man, Cristi Pogăcean, Mona Vătămanu & Florin Tudor, Christoph Büchel & Giovanni Carmine, Low-Budget Monuments (commissioner: Mihai Pop; curator: Mihnea Mircan)
- 2009 — Ștefan Constantinescu, Andrea Faciu, Ciprian Mureșan, The Seductiveness of the Interval (curator: Alina Șerban; assistant curator: Livia Pancu; collaborators: Alex Axinte, Cristi Borcan, Livia Andreea Ivanovici; project manager: Mirela Duculescu)
- 2011 — Ion Grigorescu, Anetta Mona Chișa & Lucia Tkáčová, Performing History (curator: Maria Rus Bojan, Ami Barak; special collaboration: Bogdan Ghiu and Timotei Nădășan). A parallel Romanian exhibition was hosted by The New Gallery of the Romanian Institute for Culture and Research in Humanities (Palazzo Correr): Romanian Cultural Resolution (curators: Adrian Bojenoiu, Alex. Niculescu)
- 2013 — Alexandra Pirici and Manuel Pelmuș, An Immaterial Retrospective of the Venice Biennale (curator: Raluca Voinea, project coordinator: Corina Bucea). At the New Gallery of the Romanian Institute for Culture and Research in Humanities (Palazzo Correr): Reflection Centre for Suspended Histories. An Attempt, curator: Anca Mihulet; artists: Apparatus 22, Irina Botea and Nicu Ilfoveanu, Karolina Bregula, Adi Matei, Olivia Mihălțianu, Sebastian Moldovan. Commissioner: Monica Morariu. Deputy commissioner: Alexandru Damian.
- 2015 — Adrian Ghenie, Darwin's Room (curator: Mihai Pop; architect: Attila Kim; general coordinator: Corina Șuteu) in the Romanian Pavilion (Giardini); Michele Bressan, Carmen Dobre-Hametner, Alex Mirutziu, Lea Rasovszky, Ștefan Sava, Larisa Sitar, Inventing the Truth. On Fiction and Reality (curator: Diana Marincu) in The New Gallery of the Romanian Institute for Culture and Research in Humanities (Palazzo Correr). Commissioner: Monica Morariu. Deputy commissioner: Alexandru Damian.
- 2017 — Geta Brătescu, Apparitions (curator: Magda Radu; assistant curator: Diana Ursan; project coordinator: Corina Bucea). Commissioner: Attila Kim.

== Bibliography ==
- Russeth, Andrew (April 17, 2019). "The Venice Biennale: Everything You Could Ever Want to Know". ARTnews.
- Volpi, Cristiana (2013). "Romania". In Re Rebaudengo, Adele (ed.). Pavilions and Garden of Venice Biennale. Rome: Contrasto. p. 178. ISBN 978-88-6965-440-4.
