= List of Romanian artists =

The following is a list of notable Romanian artists.

== Romanian notable artists ==
- Theodor Aman
- Ion Andreescu
- Corneliu Baba
- Sabin Bălaşa
- Horia Bernea
- Constantin Brâncuși
- Victor Brauner
- Doina Bumbea
- Ștefan Câlția
- Silvia Cambir
- Henri Catargi
- Alexandru Ciucurencu
- Horia Damian
- Eugen Drăguţescu
- Georges Dumitresco
- Ion Grigorescu
- Lucian Grigorescu
- Nicolae Grigorescu
- Marcel Iancu
- Sorin Ilfoveanu
- Petre Iorgulescu-Yor
- Alexandru Istrati
- Ştefan Luchian
- Ioan Măric
- Paul Neagu
- Romul Nuțiu
- Dimitrie Paciurea
- Dumitru Pasima
- Neculai Păduraru
- Theodor Pallady
- Stefan Pelmus
- Dan Perjovschi
- Gheorghe Petrașcu
- Magdalena Rădulescu
- Ștefan Râmniceanu
- Camil Ressu
- George Ștefănescu
- Eustațiu Stoenescu
- Ion Theodorescu-Sion
- Nicolae Tonitza
- Ion Țuculescu
- Tristan Tzara
- Andra Ursuța
