= Nicolae Dărăscu =

Romanian artist

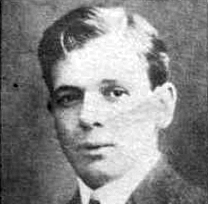
Nicolae Dărăscu

Nicolae Dărăscu (February 18, 1883 – August 14, 1959) was a Romanian painter. He was influenced by Impressionism and Neo-impressionism.

== Biography ==
Born in Giurgiu, he studied painting at the Academy of Fine Arts in Bucharest between 1902 and 1906, in the class of George Demetrescu Mirea. After graduation, he was awarded a scholarship to the Académie Julian in Paris (which, as an admirer of its former students Nicolae Grigorescu and Ștefan Luchian, he had wanted to attend). He studied under Jean-Paul Laurens and a year later, in 1907 at the École des Beaux-Arts under Luc-Olivier Merson.

Dărăscu traveled extensively and lived in the south of France (Toulon and Saint-Tropez, 1908), in Venice (1909), in Romania (in Vlaici, Olt County, 1913, and in Balcic, Southern Dobruja, 1919). He maintained permanent contacts with artists from other European cultures, visiting major art museums and extending his horizons to attempt new forms of artistic expression. Unlike many of his contemporaries, Dărăscu rarely painted interiors or still lifes.

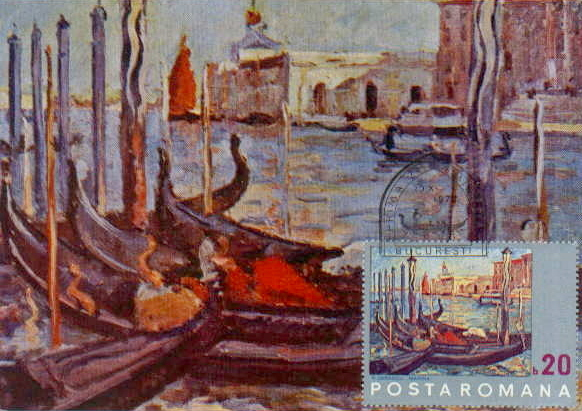
Venice gondolas, on a 1972 Romanian card

In 1917, along with the painters Camil Ressu, Ștefan Dimitrescu, Iosif Iser, Marius Bunescu and the sculptors Dimitrie Paciurea, Cornel Medrea, Ion Jalea, and Oscar Han, he founded the Arta Română association in Iași.

Aside from his artistic pursuits, Dărăscu was a professor at the Academy of Fine Arts in Bucharest between 1936 and 1950. In 1940 and 1942, some of his paintings were exhibited at the Romanian pavilion for the Venice Biennale. In 1944, his workshop and some of his paintings were destroyed during the bombing of Bucharest by the Allies.
