= Statue of Vasile Lucaciu =

Sculpture of Vasile Licaciu

The Statue of Vasile Lucaciu is a sculpture dedicated to the orator, activist and Greek Catholic priest Vasile Lucaciu (1852–1922). The work of Cornel Medrea, it is situated in Satu Mare's Liberty Square, and was unveiled in 1936.

The idea of setting up a monument to Lucaciu in Satu Mare appeared soon after his death, with the first concrete steps taken in 1927, when a planning committee was created. Funds were collected from private and government sources, and a design by local artist Aurel Popp was approved. However, the project had to be shelved due to a bank crisis. It was revived in 1935, when seven designs were submitted. Cornel Medrea’s was selected, prompting an angry response from Popp.

The bronze sculpture stands 4.5 meters tall, and depicts Lucaciu leading his people. The sculptor had seen the subject addressing crowds, and also interviewed those who knew him. The work was designed at his studio in Bucharest and cast at Nicolae Malaxa’s factory in the same city. Briefly displayed in front of the Romanian Athenaeum, it was then transported to Satu Mare, where a foundation had been dug in Liberty Square, and unveiled in December 1936.

In early September 1940, when the city, together with Northern Transylvania, was about to be occupied by Regency Hungary following the Second Vienna Award, the statue was taken down by the departing Romanian administration. On the afternoon of September 4, hours before the evacuation order went into effect, it was placed on the last train out of Satu Mare, arriving in Lugoj after a week. Two years later, it was taken to Alba Iulia, placed on the banks of the ditch in the Alba Carolina Citadel. In 1948, the new communist regime dumped the statue in a factory yard, then placed it in the Union Museum. In 1958, it was taken to the new Medrea Museum in Bucharest, where it lay on the ground. In 1968, it was returned to Satu Mare, although in a different place, as its initial site was now occupied by a monument to the Red Army. The statue was restored to its original location in 1992, after the Romanian Revolution.

The statue is listed as a historic monument by Romania's Ministry of Culture and Religious Affairs. In 2015, the statue was rehabilitated with local funds; damaged marble slabs from the pedestal were replaced with travertine slabs, a more weather-resistant material.
