= Păduraru =

Păduraru, meaning "forester", is a Romanian surname that may refer to:

- Maria Păduraru, Romanian rower
- Neculai Păduraru, Romanian sculptor and painter
- Peter (Păduraru)
- Simona Păduraru, Romanian swimmer
