= Boris Caragea =

Bulgarian sculptor

- Born: January 24, 1906; Balchik, Principality of Bulgaria
- Died: August 8, 1982 (aged 76); Bucharest, Romania
- Education: Bucharest National University of Arts
- Occupation: Sculptor

Boris Caragea (24 January 1906 — 8 August 1982) was a Romanian monumental sculptor and Corresponding Member of the Romanian Academy.

== Early life and education ==
Caragea was born on 24 January 1906 in Balchik, Bulgaria (which changed hands multiple times between Bulgaria and Romania in the early 20th century), to a working-class family. He was orphaned at age 10, and thereafter worked as a fisherman and boatman.

Caragea became interested in visual arts, and as an amateur produced sculptures in clay and sand. In the interwar period (1924–1925), he was taught sculpture by Hrandt Avakian, a young Armenian artist who had fled the Armenian genocide as a refugee and had settled in Balchik. Avakian's own work caught the attention of several high-profile Romanian figures, such as Queen Marie and curator Jean Alexandru Steriadi, and he soon migrated to Bucharest. Caragea followed Avakian, and with the support of the artist Zoe Băicoianu, he enrolled at the School of Fine Arts ("Școală de Arte Frumoase"; now called the Bucharest National University of Arts) in 1926. There, he studied under sculptors Frederic Storck and Oscar Han. He also served as an apprentice at the atelier of Dimitrie Paciurea. Facing financial difficulties, Caragea almost abandoned his studies — however, he graduated in 1932, either with the help of Han (who is said to have allowed him to condense his studies by one year) or with money from Paciurea.

== Career ==
In January 1934, he held a solo exhibition at the Theodor Aman Museum in Bucharest. This was followed by another solo exhibition at Sala Dalles in 1936. Much of his work featured folkloric or working-class scenes from his native Dobruja.

In the Communist period, Caragea became one of the leading monumental sculptors. He embraced socialist realism, and his proletarian background was emphasized in the press.

He was appointed Master Emeritus of Art in 1951, and was presented with the State Award of the Romanian People's Republic ("Premiul de Stat al Republicii Populare Române") in 1951 and 1953. Caragea was also promoted to several positions, first as a professor at the "Nicolae Grigorescu" Institute of Fine Arts in Bucharest (1949–1974), and soon after as President of the Union of Plastic Artists (1951–1957). He was elected a Corresponding Member of the Romanian Academy in 1955. In 1962, he was awarded the title of People's Artist, and elected President of the Fine Arts Council within the State Committee for Culture and Art.

Caragea completed multiple monumental works during this period. In 1953–1954, he created the sculptural facade of the National Opera in Bucharest. In 1960, his statue of Vladimir Lenin was unveiled in front of Casa Scînteii — it was demolished in March 1990 following the Romanian revolution. He also sculpted multiple statues of composer George Enescu: one which now stands on the campus of the National University of Music in Bucharest, created in 1961; a full-body portrait which is located at the George Enescu Museum in Tescani, created in 1957 (a copy also stands in Cleveland, Ohio). In 1968, his Victory Monument in Constanța was unveiled.

His work was regularly featured in Romania's State Fine Arts Salons, as well as in numerous foreign exhibitions, such as the Venice Biennale, in which he participated in 1954, 1956, and 1964.

Caragea died on 8 August 1982 in Bucharest, at the age of 76.

== Gallery ==
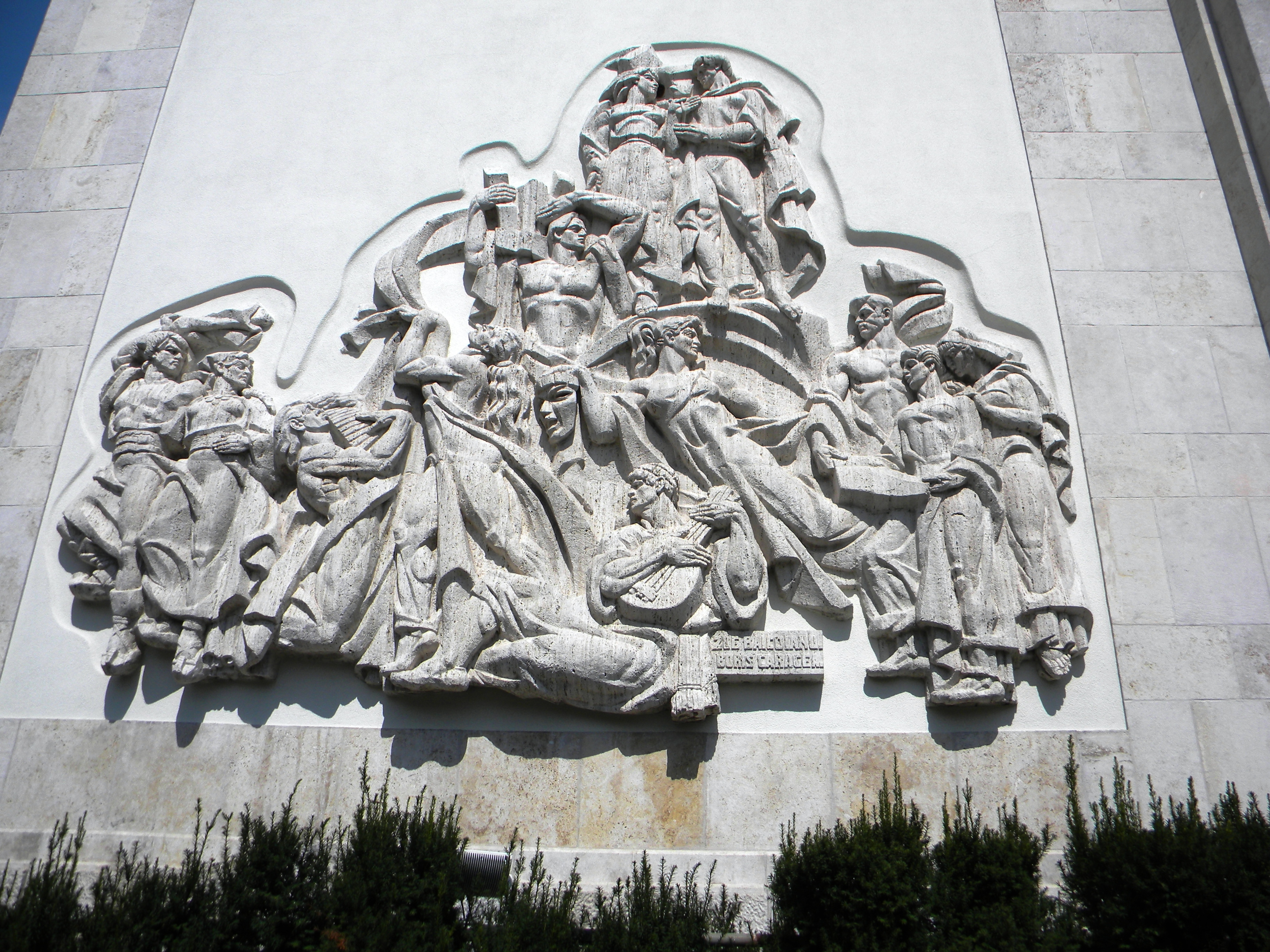
Left side of the bas-relief façade of the National Opera (1953).

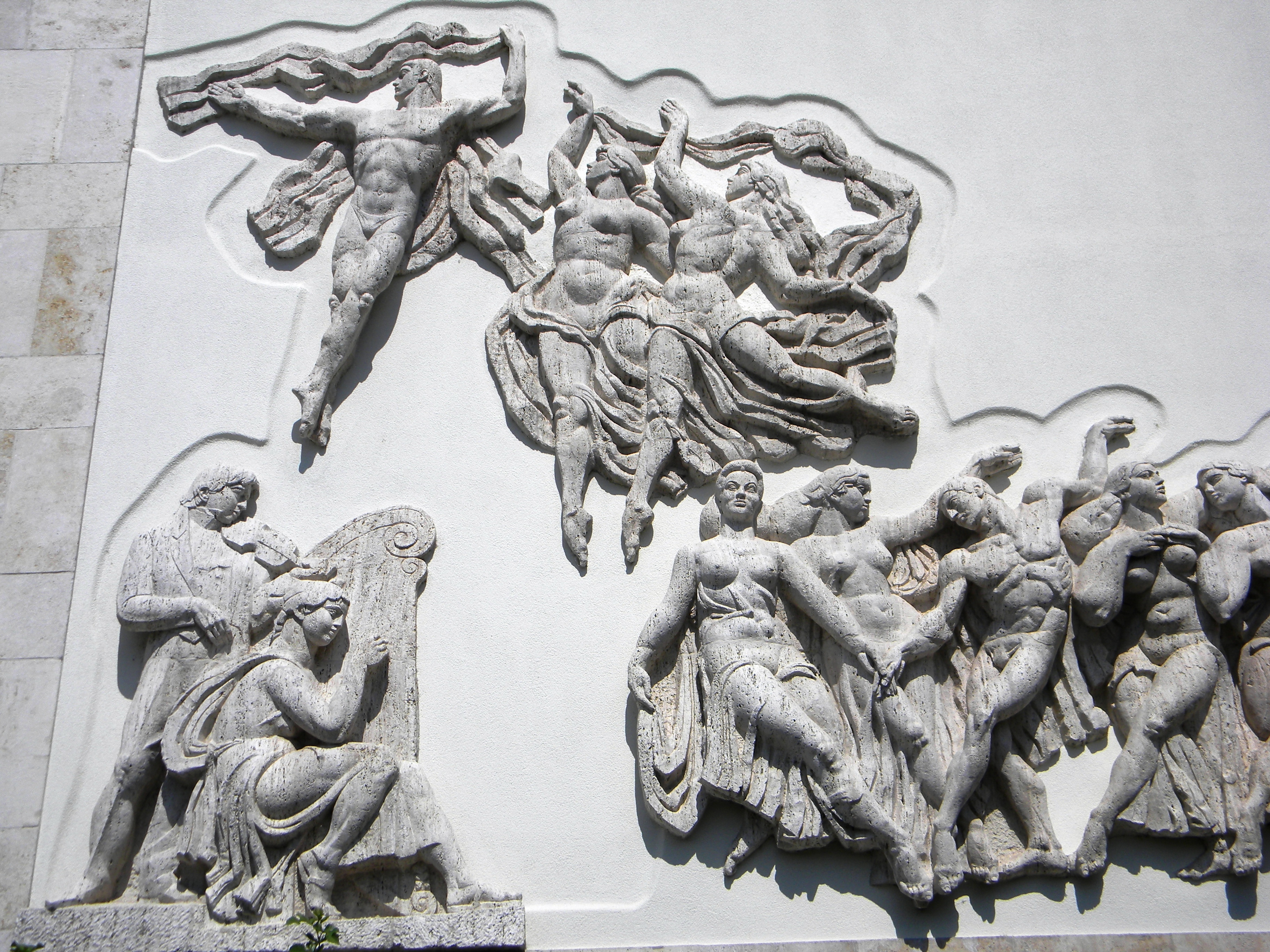
Right side of the bas-relief façade of the National Opera (1953).

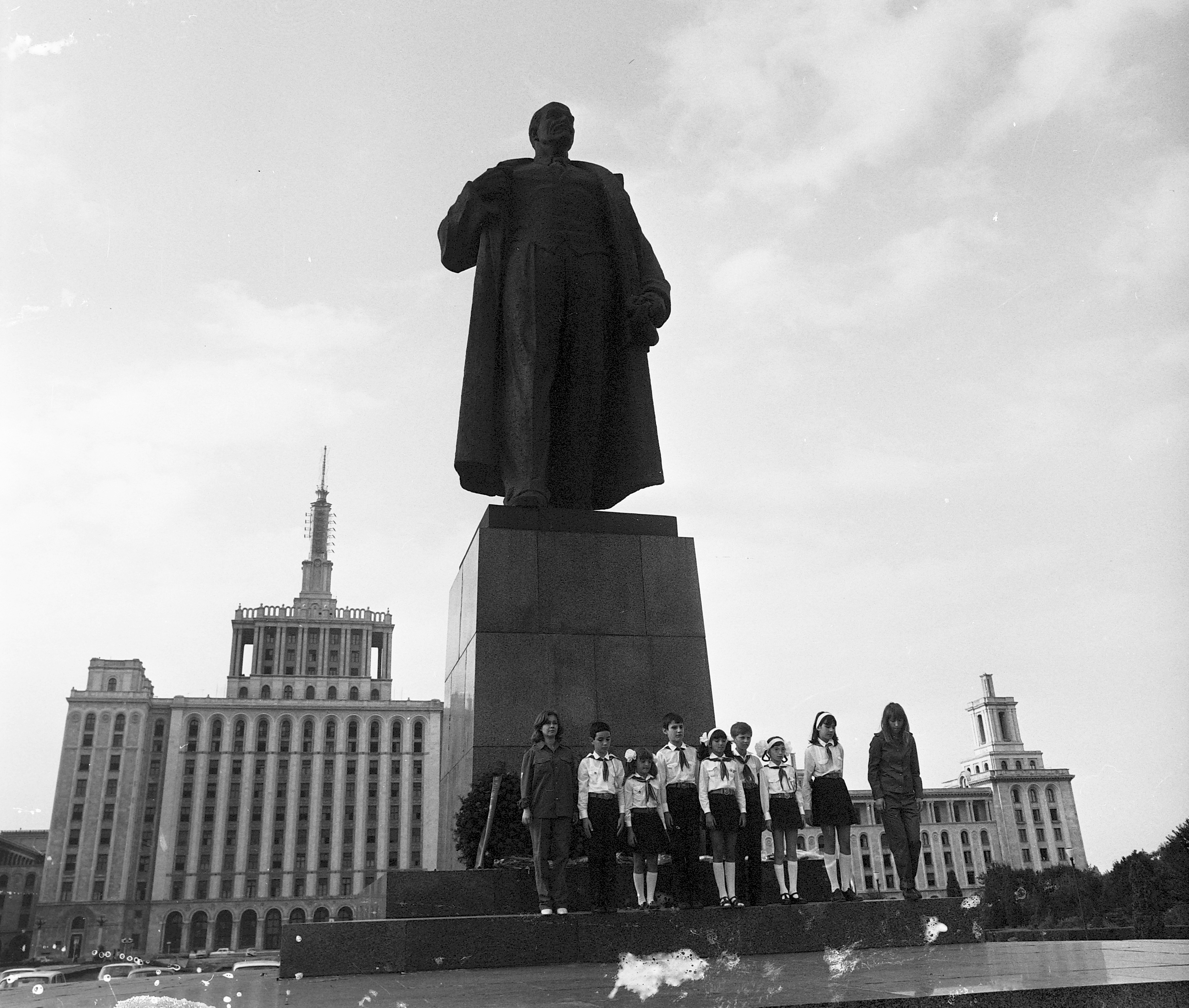
Statue of Vladimir Lenin, Bucharest (1960).

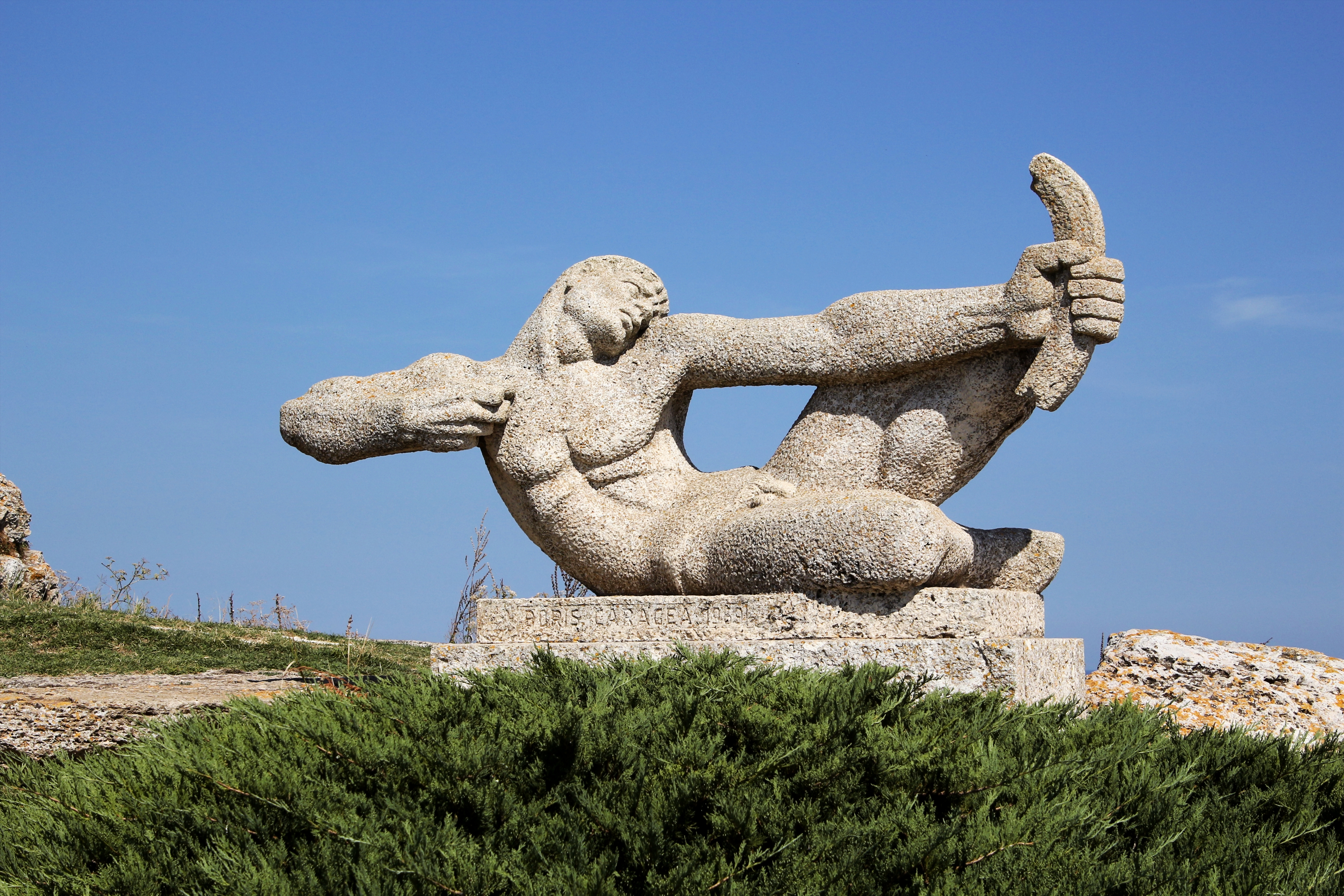
Archer monument in Cape Kaliakra, Bulgaria (1966).
