= Camil Ressu =

Romanian painter and academic

- Camil Ressu in 1927
- Born: 28 January 1880; Galați, Romania
- Died: 1 April 1962 (aged 82); Bucharest, Romania
- Education: Bucharest National University of Arts; George Enescu National University of Arts
- Movement: Post-impressionism, realism

Camil Ressu (Romanian pronunciation: [kaˈmil ˈresu]; 28 January 1880 – 1 April 1962) was a Romanian painter and academic, one of the most significant art figures of Romania.

== Biography ==
=== Early life and career ===
Born in Galați, Ressu came from an Aromanian family that migrated to Romania from Macedonia at the start of the 19th century. His father, Constantin Ressu was a journalist and had studied law in Brussels. He was also an artist in his spare time. In 1887, Ressu was enrolled at the School of Fine Arts in Bucharest. He continued his studies at the School of Fine Arts in Iași, where he studied with painters Gheorghe Popovici and Gheorghe Panaiteanu Bardasare. In 1902, he finished his studies in Iași, being awarded a silver medal, and left Romania for Paris, seeking to further develop his artistic skills. In Paris, he studied at the Académie Julian.

In 1908, Ressu returned to Romania and became interested in social matters, contributing satirical drawings to several publications, including Furnica, Facla, and Adevărul. In the same year, he became a member of the Social Democratic Party of Romania (or, rather, its surviving Bucharest circle, Socialist Union of Romania, formed around the paper România Muncitoare). In 1910, his works (landscapes and paintings with bucolic themes) were featured in the Tinerimii Artistice ("Artistic Youth") exhibition. Ressu opened his first personal exhibition in 1914, in Bucharest.

=== Renown ===
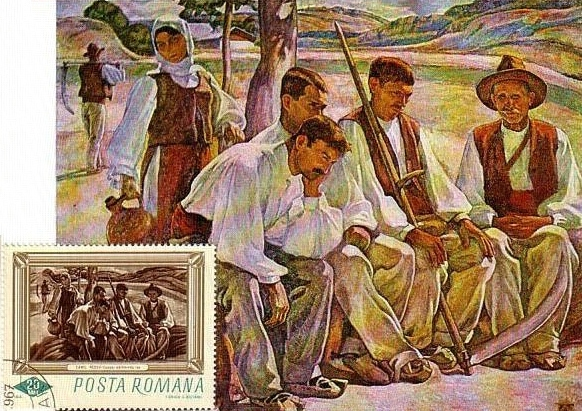
Reapers at Rest on a 1966 Romanian stamp

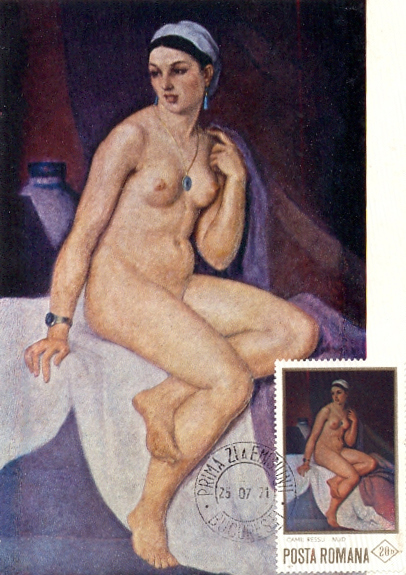
Nude on a 1971 Romanian stamp

In 1917, along with the painters Nicolae Dărăscu, Ștefan Dimitrescu, Iosif Iser, Marius Bunescu and the sculptors Dimitrie Paciurea, Cornel Medrea, Ion Jalea, and Oscar Han, he founded the Art of Romania association in Iași. During these years, he further developed his style as a landscape painter, and frequently visited the countryside in summer to paint portraits of peasants working in the fields and views of villages. He also painted still life, portraits of various personalities, and nudes.

In 1921, he became the president of the Artists' Union of Romania. In 1925, after a prolonged stay in the village of Ilovăț, Mehedinți County, Ressu finished one of his best-known paintings, Reapers at Rest, currently housed in the Iași Museum of Art.

Aside from his artistic pursuits, Camil Ressu was a professor at the Academy of Fine Arts in Bucharest until 1941. From 1950, he was the honorary president of the Artists' Union and a professor at the Nicolae Grigorescu Art Institute. In 1955, Romania's Communist regime awarded him the title of "People's Artist", and he later became a member of the Romanian Academy. He died in Bucharest in 1962, and was buried in the city's Bellu Cemetery.

== Gallery ==
Peasant Women in Church (1912)

Countryside Funeral (1912)

The Beer-Hall Academy (1913)

Vlaici Church (1912-1914)

Reapers at Rest (1925)

Bathing (1924-1925)
