= Romanian art =

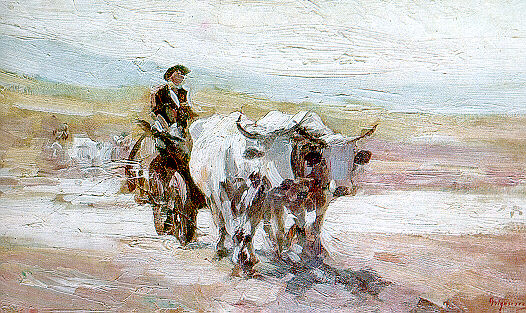
Ox cart, one of the most iconic Romanian artworks, by Nicolae Grigorescu, 1899

Romanian art consists of the visual and plastic arts (including Romanian architecture, woodwork, textiles, and ceramics) originating from the geographical area of Romania. The production of art in Romania is as old as the Paleolithic, an example being a cave painting from the Cuciulat Cave (Sălaj County). During the Neolithic, multiple cultures lived on the modern territory of Romania. Their material culture included pottery and abstract clay statuettes decorated with geometric patterns. These may give hints on the way these civilizations used to dress and maybe tattoo. A good examples of this is the Thinker of Hamangia, a clay figurine produced by the Hamangia culture. Important cultures of the Neolithic era include Starčevo–Körös–Criș, Boian, Gumelnița–Karanovo, and other ones, the most famous and at the same time the most evolved among them in art being the Cucuteni–Trypillia culture. During Antiquity, the Geto-Dacians produced art and built multiple cities of the dava type (like Sucidava, Argedava or Buridava). Greek colonies appear in Dobruja, including Tomis (present-day Constanța), and Mangalia (present-day Mangalia). After the Dacian Wars (101–102, 105–106), Emperor Trajan transformed a big part of Dacia into a province of the Roman Empire. The province underwent an intense process of Romanization (aka Latinization).

Between the 5th and the 8th centuries, the process of Romanian etnogenesis takes place. This era is labeled by scientist as pre-Medieval or pre-Feudal. Since Romania was and is an Eastern Orthodox country, its medieval art was heavily influenced by the Byzantine Empire. The Renaissance has a quite loose influence in Wallachia and Moldavia. During the reign of Constantin Brâncoveanu (1688-1714), the Brâncovenesc style appears, also known as Brâncovenesc Baroque, because it used Baroque elements from West Europe and Ottoman ones. The 19th century was one of change. Together with the 20th, it marked the transition from medieval to modern. Across these centuries, multiple Romanian artists and architects study at West European universities, particularly in Paris. Gheorghe Tattarescu is representative for Neoclassicism, as well as Nicolae Grigorescu is for Impressionism. This shift is also reflected in the architecture of cities, which started to look more European, Neoclassical and Beaux-Arts architecture being very popular in late 19th and early 20th centuries. Later, Romania remains connected with the West, trends and styles such as Art Nouveau, Art Deco or Bauhaus being as fashionable here as in West Europe.

== Historic overview ==
=== Prehistory ===
The present-day territory of Romania was inhabited by various cultures during Prehistory. The first objects featuring abstract geometric ornaments are from the Late Paleolithic and early Mesolithic, discovered in 1966 in the Iron Gates area, in settlements at Cuina Turcului, Schela Cladovei, Ostrovul Banatului etc. Usually these are household items with simple geometric incisions. A cave painting was discovered in the Cuciulat Cave (Sălaj County), probably dating from the Late Paleolithic.

During the Neolithic era, various cultures populated the current territory of Romania. Just like in the rest of Europe, the Neolithic starts in area of Romania in the 4th millennium BC. Scientists think that at the beginning of the Neolithic, migratory populations come here from West Asia, which will remain here and fuse with the locals from Mesolithic. Human communities make a transition to sedentary life. They left us pottery and abstract clay statuettes decorated with geometric patterns, that may give us hints on the way these civilizations used to dress and maybe tattoo. Just like art Palaeolithic art, Neolithic artworks are decorated with abstract geometric patterns, lines and spirals. Some of them may had religious or magical meanings. However, there's a big chance of these geometric ornaments having a purely decorative purpose, without any deep meaning.

The first Neolithic culture, known as the Starčevo–Körös–Criș culture has spread all across the territory of present-day Romania, and produced many ceramic objects, especially vessels, but also zoomorphic and anthropomorphic figures. After it, the Vinča-Turdaș, Boian, Vădastra, Hamangia, Gumelnița–Karanovo, Cernavodă cultures and other ones lived simultaneous in different areas. Chronologically, the Vinča-Turdaș is the earliest one from the list. It produced highly stylized anthropomorphic statuettes. The Hamangia culture that inhabited Dobruja produced ceramic figurines too. A really famous one, known as the Thinker of Hamangia, depicts, as the name suggests, a man thinking, staying on a small chair, with his elbows on the knees. Because of its expressiveness, the figure is one of the most iconic Romanian artworks.

The most famous Neolithic culture is Cucuteni–Trypillia. It produced many polychrome vessels in various shapes. All these vessels show the precision of the Neolithic people, since potter's wheel wasn't invented it, and so all these objects were produced manually. Just like any other culture of its time, it used geometric ornaments to decorate its artifacts, including sinuous lines, spirals, ovals combined with zigzags, and rhombi. The colours used for these vessels include white, red and/or chocolate black, used in various shades, since these they can be bicoloured or tricoloured.

Neolithic cultures are succeeded by the ones of Bronze Age, initially characterized by inferior artistic elements if we compare it to Cucuteni art. New architectural elements appear, especially in military structures. Besides bordei, which were specific to Neolithic settlements, fortifications appear. In one of these Bronze Age settlements, the one discovered at Monteoru (Buzău County), there are stone walls and defence towers. Ceramic, although in absence of ornamentation like in Neolithic times, starts to change too. Gold, bronze and copper vessels are produced. In a short interval of tine, in comparison with the millennia of Neolithic art, a few cultures of a high technical and artistic level develop on the territory of Romania. Bronze Age cultures include Sighișoara-Wietenberg, Verbicioara, Monteoru, Ottomány and Žuto Brdo - Gârla Mare.

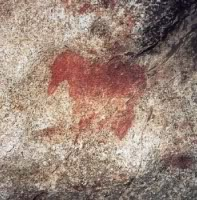
Cave painting, probably from the Late Paleolithic, pigment on stone, Cuciulat Cave, Sălaj County

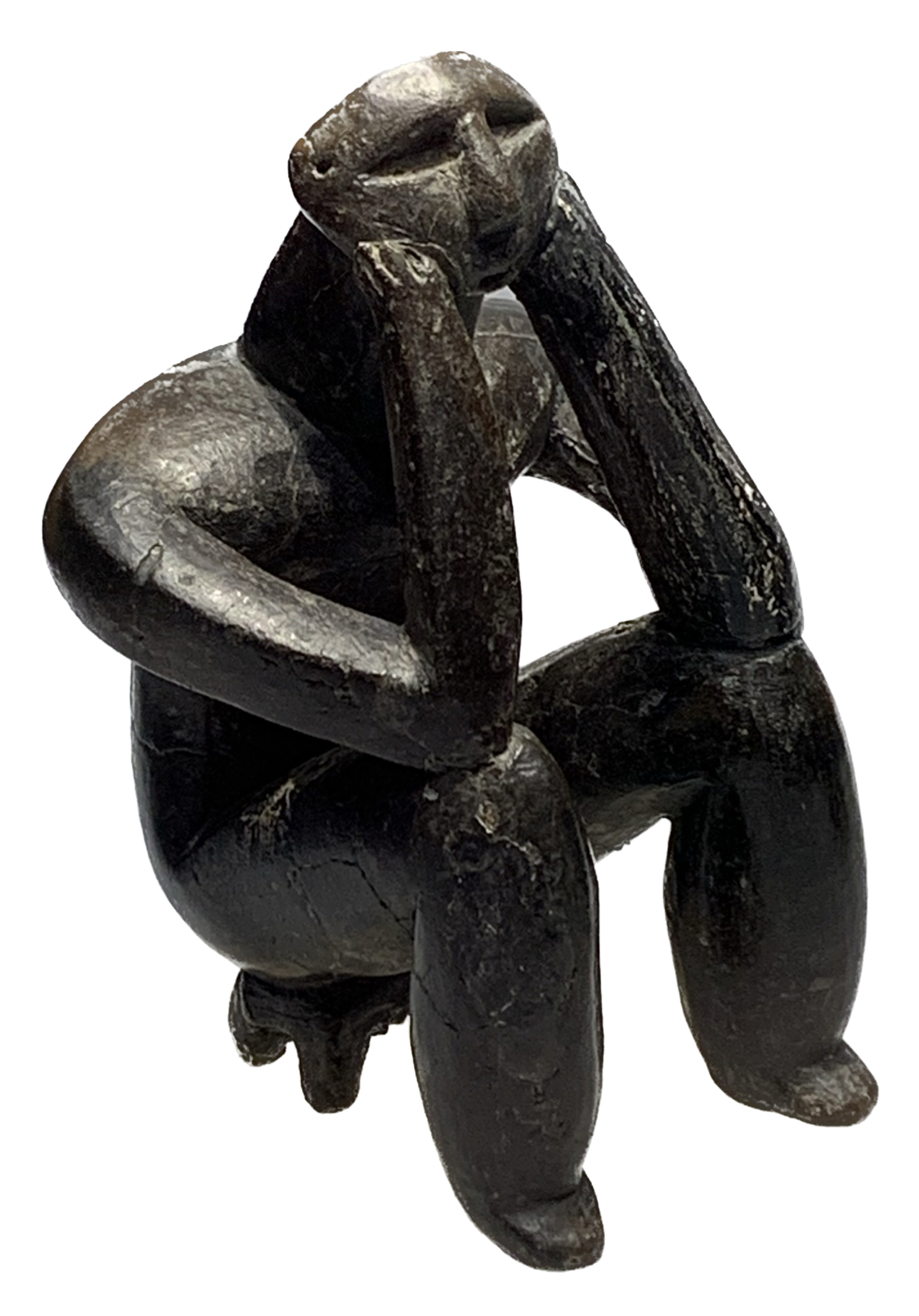
The Thinker, by the Hamangia culture, c. 5000 BC, terracotta, National Museum of Romanian History, Bucharest

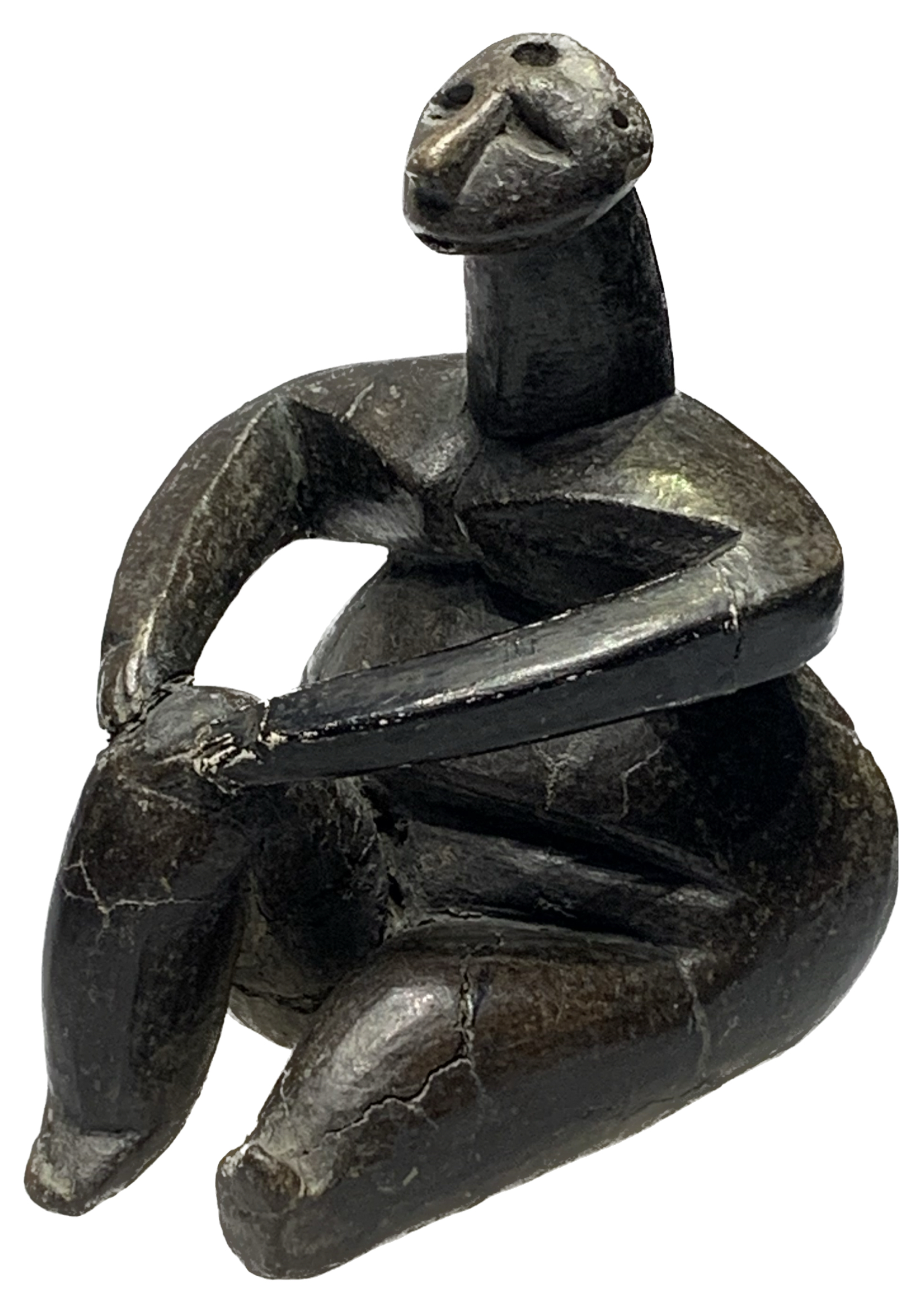
The Sitting Woman, by the Hamangia culture, c. 5000 BC, terracotta, National Museum of Romanian History

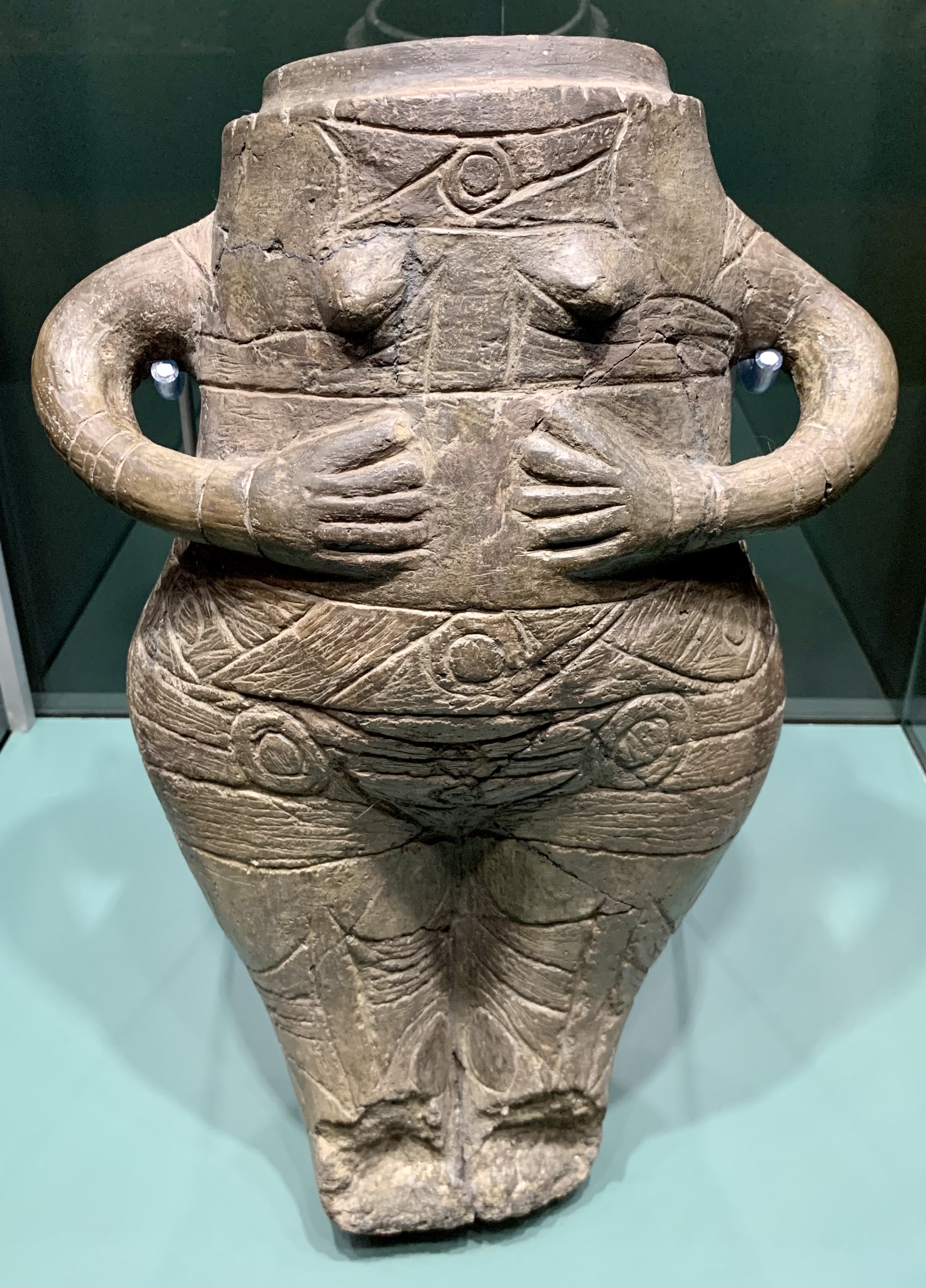
The Goddess from Vidra, by the Gumelnița–Karanovo culture, c. 4700-3950 BC, ceramic, Bucharest Municipal Museum

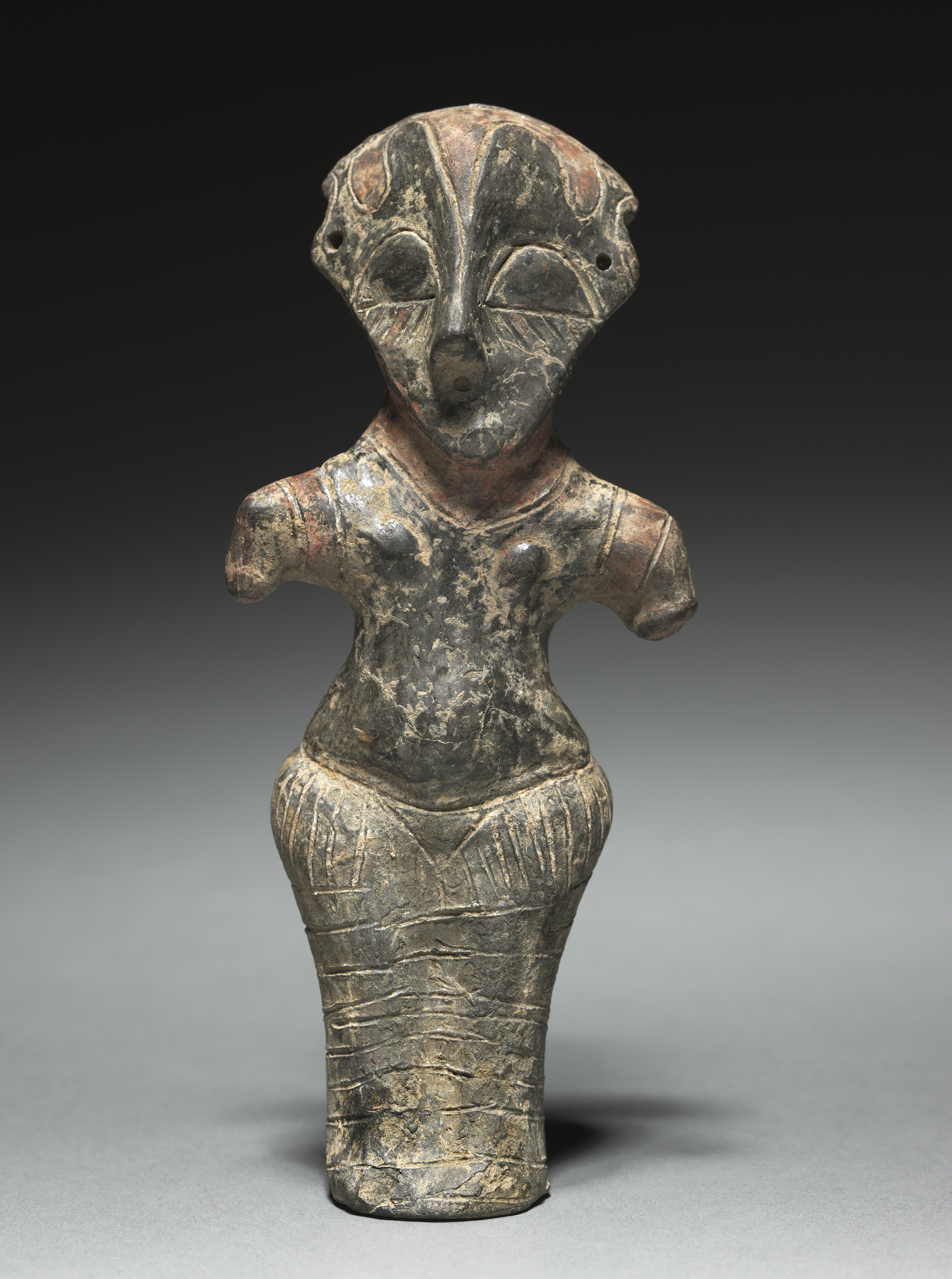
Female figure, by the Vinča culture, c. 4500-3500 BC, fired clay with paint, Cleveland Museum of Art, Ohio, USA

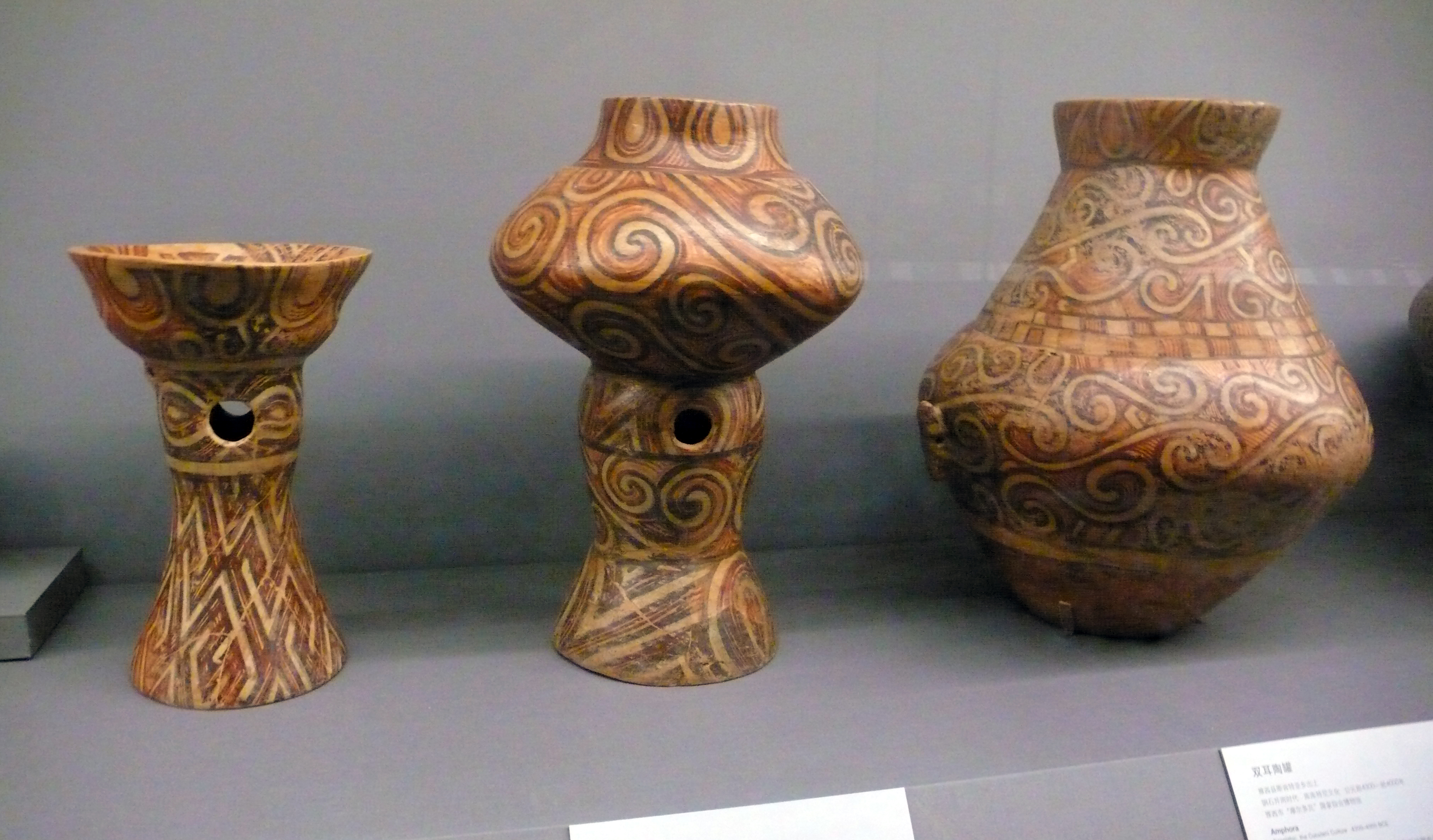
Polychrome vessels (from left to right): a bowl on stand, a vessel on stand and an amphora, by the Cucuteni–Trypillia culture, c. 4300–4000 BC, fired clay with paint, Palace of Culture, Iași, Romania

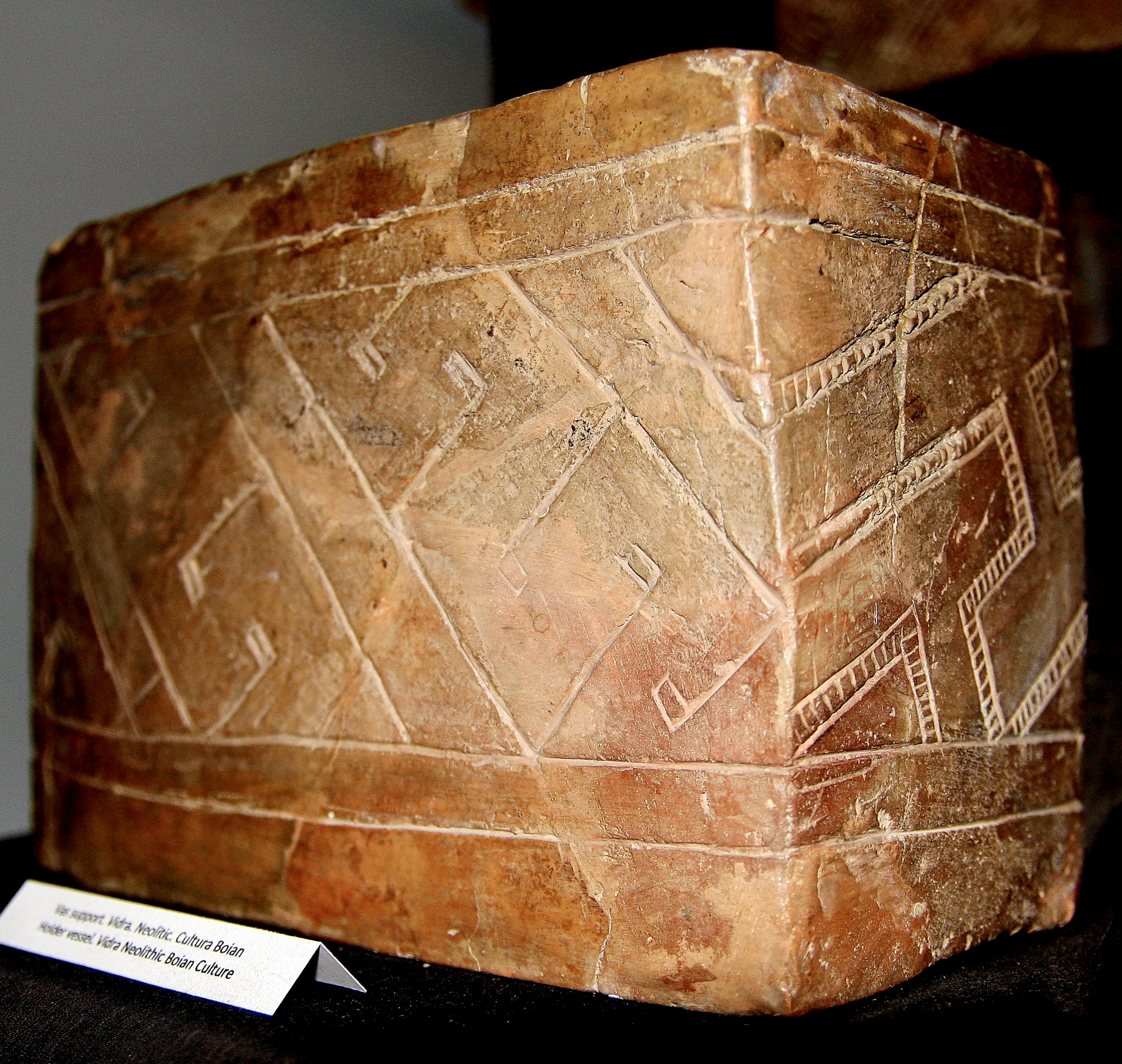
Vessel, by the Boian culture, c. 4300–3500 BC, ceramic, Bucharest Municipal Museum

== See also ==
- List of Romanian artists
- For information about Romanian literature, see: Romanian literature
- For information about Romanian history, see: History of Romania
- For other topics on Romanian culture, see: Romanian culture

== References and further reading ==
- Vasile Florea: Arta Românească de la Origini până în Prezent ISBN 978-606-33-1053-9
