= Olinescu =

Olinescu is a Romanian surname. Notable people with the surname include:

- Mălina Olinescu (1974–2011), Romanian singer
- Marcel Olinescu (1896–1992), Romanian engraver
