= House of the Free Press =

Building in Bucharest, Romania

- Casa Presei Libere
- Interactive map of the House of the Free Press area
- Former names: Casa Scînteii

General information
- Architectural style: Stalinist architecture (see Seven Sisters)
- Location: Bucharest, Romania
- Coordinates: 44.480907°N 26.071261°E
- Construction started: 1952
- Completed: 1957

Height
- Height: 104 m (341 ft)

Technical details
- Floor area: 32,000 m^{2} (344,445 sq ft)

Design and construction
- Architect: Horia Maicu
- Engineer: Panaite C. Mazilu

The House of the Free Press (Romanian: Casa Presei Libere), built and known under Communist rule as Casa Scînteii (' The Spark Building') after the Party newspaper edited and printed there, is a building in northern Bucharest, Romania, the tallest in the city between 1956 and 2007.

== History ==
A horse race track was built in 1905 on the future site of the House of the Free Press. A third of the track was removed in 1950 to make way for a wing of the building, and the race track was finally closed and demolished in 1960, after a decision by Gheorghe Gheorghiu-Dej.

Construction began in 1952 and was completed in 1956. The building was named Combinatul Poligrafic Casa Scînteii "I.V. Stalin" ('The Scînteia Building Poligraphic Combine [named for] J.V. Stalin) and later simply Casa Scînteii (Scînteia was the name of the Romanian Communist Party's official newspaper). It was designed by the architect Horia Maicu, in the Stalinist style of Socialist realism, resembling the main building of the Moscow State University, and was intended to house all of Bucharest's printing presses, the newsrooms and their staff.

It has a foundation with an area of 280 by 260 metres (920 ft × 850 ft), the total constructed surface is 32,000 m^{2} (344,445 sq ft) and it has a volume of 735,000 m^{3} (26,000,000 cu ft). Its height is 91.6 m (301 ft) without the television antenna, which measures an additional 12.4 m (41 ft), bringing the total height to 104 m (341 ft).

Between 1952 and 1966, Casa Scînteii was featured on the reverse of the 100 lei banknote.

On 21 April 1960, a statue of Vladimir Lenin, made by Romanian sculptor Boris Caragea, was placed in front of the building. However, this statue was removed on 3 March 1990, following the Romanian Revolution of 1989. On 30 May 2016, the Monument of the Anti-Communist Fight ("Wings") was inaugurated in the same place.

Renamed Casa Presei Libere ("House of the Free Press"), the building has basically the same role nowadays, with many of today's newspapers having their headquarters in it. The Bucharest Stock Exchange (Bursa de Valori București, BVB) was located in the Southern wing at one point.

As of 2023, the House of the Free Press is the only building in Bucharest that has kept the hammer and sickle communist symbol, which appears on reliefs on its façade.

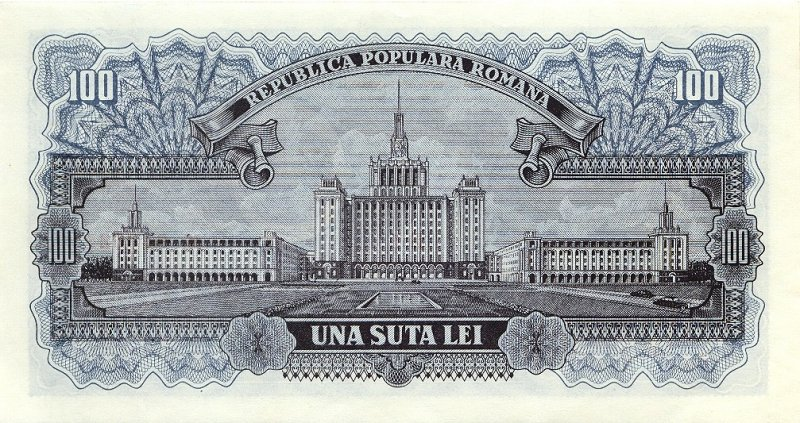
Casa Scînteii on the reverse of a 100-lei banknote, 1952

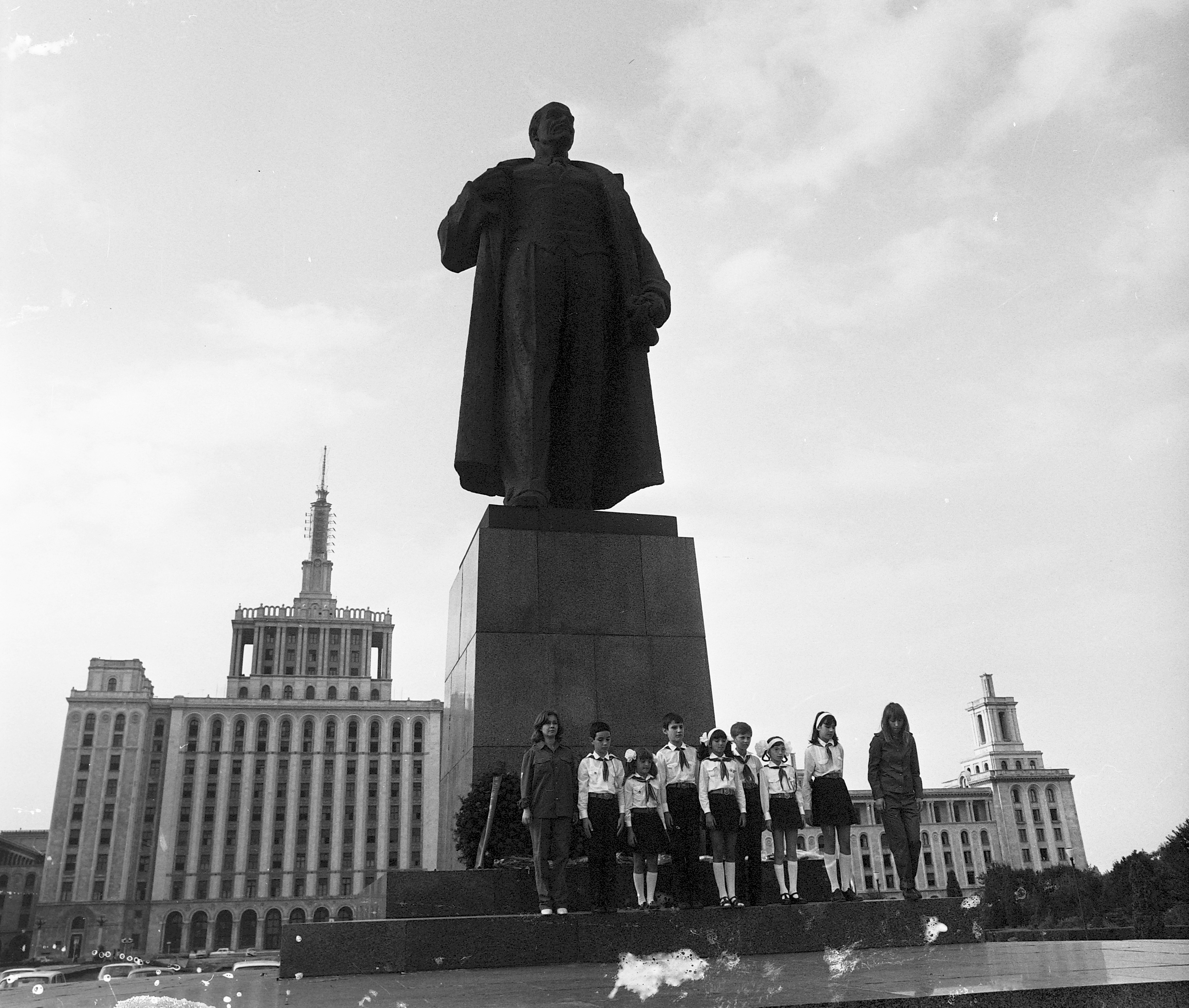
Gathering of Romanian young pioneers at Lenin's statue in front of Casa Scînteii in 1977

The House of the Free Press and the "Wings" Monument

General view from the Free Press Square

View of building sometime between 1990 and 2016

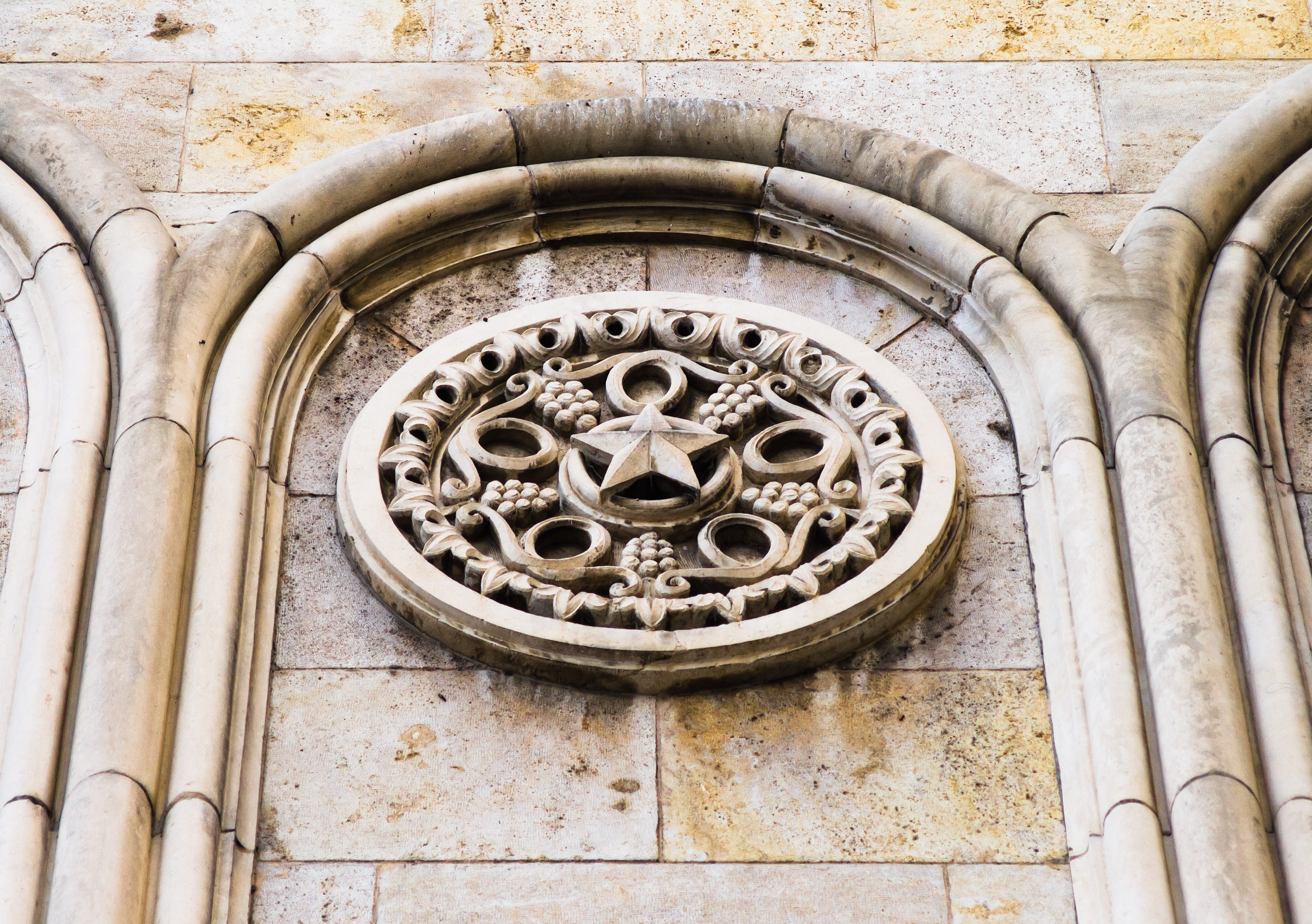
Soviet-style five-pointed star on the façade

== See also ==
- Socialist realism in Romania
- Stalinist skyscrapers, overview list: "Seven Sisters" in Moscow and similar ones elsewhere
