= Marcel Olinescu =

Romanian engraver

Marcel Olinescu (Romanian pronunciation: [marˈtʃel oliˈnesku]; September 17, 1896 – February 15, 1992) was a Romanian engraver.

Born in Dorohoi, his father Teofil was a German-language teacher who came from Hliboka (Adâncata) in Austrian-ruled Bukovina. His mother, Terezia (née Kernbach), came from a family of German doctors. He attended primary school in his native town, followed by gymnasium at Pomârla from 1907 to 1911. Between 1919 and 1921, he attended the Fine Arts Academy in Iași, followed by the National School of Fine Arts in Bucharest from 1921 to 1923. There, one of his professors was Dimitrie Paciurea. Following his graduation, he found a position at Brad, in the Țara Moților area of Transylvania, as a teacher of calligraphy and drawing. Spending three years there, Olinescu became fascinated by the local lifestyle, producing ten engravings centered on the local gold-mining industry. He also drew portraits featuring leaders of the Transylvanian Revolution of 1848, after earlier paintings by Barbu Iscovescu. In 1925, together with Dumitru Ghiață, he hosted an exhibition of his Țara Moților work at the Romanian Athenaeum, also publishing an album.

In 1926, Olinescu went to Botoșani to teach at A. T. Laurian High School. The following year, he settled at Arad, where he taught drawing at the boys' commercial high school. From 1933 to 1937, he edited the local Știrea newspaper, while in 1931, he co-founded an artistic society in Arad. Together with other members, who included Gheorghe Ciuhandu, he edited the literary and cultural magazine Hotarul, in 24 pages, which first appeared in 1933. Starting in October 1934, he also edited Duh, a magazine focused on art, literary criticism and philosophy. He worked on Dimitrie Gusti's sociological research teams.

Sculpting in an improvised workshop in the courtyard of his school, he executed busts of the local pedagogue Petre Pipoș and of a newspaperman from Știrea. He also produced a bust of 1784 revolutionary Crișan, after a contemporary oil painting; this was placed in Vaca, the revolutionary's native village. While at Arad, he published a volume of verse. He left the city in 1937, teaching in Bucharest between that year and 1958. Olinescu took part in drawing exhibitions with the Grupul Grafic society in 1940, 1943 and 1946. His most comprehensive exhibition took place in 1977 at the Romanian Athenaeum; this featured a large number of engravings. The books he illustrated include Din țara moților (1925), Botoșanii care se duc (1927), Miorița (1940), Mitologia românească (1944), Târgoviște de ieri și de azi (1976) and Peisaje (1983). Today, 52 works by Olinescu are held by the Museum of Dacian and Roman Civilization in Deva. Most are woodcuts; the rest, linocuts.
