= Constantin Lucaci =

Romanian contemporary sculptor

Constantin Lucaci (July 7, 1923 – July 20, 2014) was a Romanian contemporary sculptor, best known for his monumentalist sculptures and his kinetic fountains (or decorative moving metal fountains) most made from stainless steel, among which those from the Romanian cities of Reșița and Constanța are best known. He was born in Bocșa Română, today a part of Bocșa, Caraș-Severin County.

From 1993 up until his death Lucaci was a professor at The Sculpture Department of The Academy of Belle Arts, Cluj-Napoca, Romania. His works, both "regular" and monumental are to be found in various Romanian museums as well as abroad.

Outside of Romania, Lucaci's kinetic sculpture Star is a part of the permanent exhibition "Fucina degli Angeli", Venice, Italy, exposed among works of artists such Marc Chagall, Max Ernst, Pablo Picasso and Mark Tobey. Other works by Lucaci are to be found in personal collections from cities such as Antwerp, Copenhagen, Ferrara, Milan, Rome and Venice.

Lucaci was bestowed with numerous national and international prizes and awards. He is a recipient of the Romanian Academy prize for his entire career (1990), of Herder Prize for his entire work (1984) and of Gold Medal at the International Biennale of Art dedicated to Dante - Ravenna (1999) for his monumental art.

Lucaci died aged 91 on July 20, 2014.

== Prizes and awards ==
- 1953 - "Medal of Toil" - Romania
- 1968 - "Cultural Merit" Order - Romania
- 1974 - The Romanian Union of Plastic Artists' Prize for Monumental Art
- 1982 - "Knight of the Italian Republic" Order of Merit
- 1984 - Prize of the Romanian weekly magazine "Flacăra" for his Romanian series of kinetic fountains displayed in various Romanian cities
- 1984 - "Herder" Prize of the University of Vienna for his entire work
- 1990 - Prize of the Romanian Academy for his entire work
- 1999 - Gold Medal at the International Biennale of Art dedicated to Dante - Ravenna
- 2000 - "Freeman" of the city of Reșița
- 2001 - Prize of "The Romanian Cultural Foundation"

== Biography ==
- 1923 - born in Bocsa Romana, Banat, Romania
- 1929 - 1945 - During his childhood and youth the artist developed three major interests : the study of the surrounding world through Mathematics and Physics lessons, as well as music and modelling. Hew studied drawing and modelling with T. Botlich, an artist educated in the artistic milieu of Paris at the turn of the century and a former colleague of Meštrović for two decades.
- 1945 - Attended the courses of the "Guguianu" Free Academy of Arts in Bucharest under Camil Ressu, Al. Ciucurencu and C. Medrea.
- 1948 - After his graduation of " Guguianu" Academy of Arts, he entered "Nicolae Grigorescu" Fine Arts Institute .Début at the Official Salon held in Bucharest where he exhibited " The Builders". Since then, he has participated in every annual and biannual art exhibition.
- 1950 - While a student, he displayed " The Swimmer" at the Official Salon in Bucharest, a sculpture piece that drew the attention of G. Oprescu.
- 1953 - Graduated " Nicolae Grigorescu" Fine Arts Institute.
- - April 29 married Irina Tomescu.
- - in April he participated to the Romanian Exhibition of Fine Arts held in Helsinki.
- 1954 - Works of sculpture displayed in the Romanian Art Exhibition presented at the Biannual di Venezia.
- 1958 - A participant in the Fine Arts Exhibition in Moscow.
- 1959 - Stainless steel works exhibited in the Romanian Fine Arts Exhibition in Budapest.
- 1961 - Participated in the Romanian Art Exhibition initiated in Damascus, Cairo, Alexandria.
- He also took part in the Exhibition of Sculptors' Drawings in Moscow
- 1963 - Attended courses at the Fine Arts Academy "Pietro Vanuci", Peruggia.
- 1966- Scholarship in France where he studied French and European sculpture but was especially attracted by Egyptian sculpture made of granite and basalt.
- Began a serie of monumental works made of stainless steel, later grouped by the artist in the serie "Space and Light".
- 1967 - Stainless steel monumental works in the Open- air Exhibition of Sculpture of Middelheim Park, Antwerpen.
- 1968 - Study trips to France, Belgium, Italy.
- 1972 - An exhibition of sculpture housed by the "French Library" in Bucharest ( 10–20 May).
- 1975 - Participated to the Romanian Art Exhibition of Contemporary Romanian Art in Belgrade, Damascus, Cairo and Alexandria.
- Participant in the Romanian Art Exhibition "Plastik und Bulmen" in Berlin
- A guest artist of " Fucina degli Angeli" Venice, he created the " Star", a kinetic sculpture made of stainless steel and glass, now part of the permanent display of " Fucina degli Angeli ", next to works by Mark Tobey, Picasso, Max Ernst, Chagall.
- Study trip to France
- 1976 - Participated in the International Congress of AIAP in Baghdad.
- 1977 - September, invited to Havana as a participant i the founding Congress of the Artists' Union.
- " Fucina degli Angeli" album published in Venice with a special chapter on the work of Constantin Lucaci.
- Participated in the Exhibition of Romanian Fine Arts, Moscow.
- 1979 - A participant in the Exhibition of Small Sculpture - Romanian Contemporary Art, Damascus.
- Participated in the AIAP Congress held in Stockholm.
- 1980 - Invited by the French Government to be present at the opening of the "Brâncuși" Museum within the Georges Pompidou Centre, Beaoubourg, Paris.
- Participated in the international conference on the " Improvement of the Environment" held in Manila, Philippines.
- 1984 - February–March, solo exhibition at The Italian Cultural Institute in Bucharest.
- Since 1988 - A member of the international jury of the Biannual of Art dedicated to Dante, Ravenna.
- Since 1993- A professor of the Fine Arts Academy, the Sculpture Department, Cluj.

== Works ==
- Works of Constantin Lucaci are in the custody of many museums in Romania. Collections of art abroad : Antwerp, Copenhagen, Venice, Rome, Milan, Ferrara.
