= Ștefan Popescu =

Romanian footballer

Personal information
- Full name: Ștefan Adrian Popescu
- Date of birth: 5 May 1993 (age 33)
- Place of birth: Iași, Romania
- Height: 1.80 m (5 ft 11 in)
- Position: Left back

Youth career
- 2002–2006: Noua Generație Iași
- 2007–2009: Școala de Fotbal Gheorghe Popescu
- 2009–2011: AS Roma
- 2011–2012: Cesena

Senior career*
Years	Team	Apps	(Gls)
2012	Cesena	0	(0)
2012–2014	Ajaccio	6	(0)
2012–2013	→ Marseille II (loan)	16	(0)
2013–2014	→ Ajaccio II (loan)	3	(0)
2014	Astra Giurgiu	2	(0)
2014–2015	Cagliari	0	(0)
2014–2015	→ Ternana (loan)	26	(0)
2015–2017	Modena	50	(3)
2017–2018	Salernitana	11	(0)
2018–2019	Politehnica Iași	0	(0)
Total		114	(3)

International career
2010–2011	Romania U17	3	(0)
2011–2012	Romania U19	3	(0)
2013–2014	Romania U21	5	(0)
- * Club domestic league appearances and goals as of 1 June 2019

Ștefan Adrian Popescu (born 5 May 1993) is a Romanian former professional footballer who played as a left back.

== Club career ==
=== Youth career ===
Popescu was born on 5 May 1993 in Iași, Romania and began playing junior-level football at age 8 under coach Sorin Ștefan at the Noua Generație Iași club. He participated in a football tournament organized by Gillette, where he was noticed by Emerich Jenei who compared him to Roberto Carlos. Following his performance in the tournament, he earned a move to Gheorghe Popescu's football school. In 2009, Bruno Conti noticed him in a match he played against Dinamo București, bringing him to AS Roma. There, Popescu suffered a rough injury which necessitated surgery. In 2011, he moved to Cesena.

=== Cesena and Ajaccio ===
Popescu played his first match as a senior on 12 January 2012, when coach Daniele Arrigoni used him as a starter in a 2–1 away loss to Napoli in the 2010–11 Coppa Italia round of 32. He scored his side's goal in the 21st minute of the game, but suffered an injury eight minutes later and was substituted.

Popescu moved to French side Ajaccio in September 2012 after impressing coach Alex Dupont in a trial, but was loaned shortly afterwards to Marseille's fifth-tier satellite club. Subsequently, he returned to Ajaccio and made his Ligue 1 debut on 25 August 2013, when coach Fabrizio Ravanelli sent him in the 82nd minute to replace Sigamary Diarra in a 0–0 draw against Nice. In January 2014, after only six months and six league matches played, he left Ajaccio after his contract was terminated by mutual agreement, along with teammate and fellow Romanian Adrian Mutu.

=== Astra Giurgiu, Cagliari and Ternana ===
In February 2012, Popescu went to play for Astra Giurgiu. He made his Liga I debut on 12 April under coach Florin Marin in a 1–0 home win over Concordia Chiajna. In his five-month spell, he made only two league appearances for Astra, faced with stiff competition from Júnior Morais for a place in the starting lineup.

In the summer of 2014, Popescu signed a contract with Cagliari after impressing coach Zdeněk Zeman. However, shortly after being signed he was loaned to Ternana, making his Serie B debut on 28 October 2014 in a 3–1 away loss to Carpi.

=== Modena, Salernitana and Politehnica Iași ===
In August 2015, Popescu joined Serie B club Modena where he was coached by Hernán Crespo. After the team suffered relegation at the end of the 2015–16 season, Popescu extended his contract with the club. During the 2016–17 Lega Pro season, he netted a brace in a 4–1 victory against Feralpisalò and one goal in a 2–0 win over Bassano Virtus. Subsequently, he went to play for Salernitana. In March 2019, Popescu signed with Politehnica Iași where he spent four months without playing any league matches, retiring afterwards at age 26.

== International career ==
From 2010 to 2014, Popescu played several matches for Romania's under-17, under-19 and under-21 sides. During his time with the under-19 team, he and five other players received a one-year ban from representing their country at any level for acts of indiscipline.
