= Jean Alexandru Steriadi =

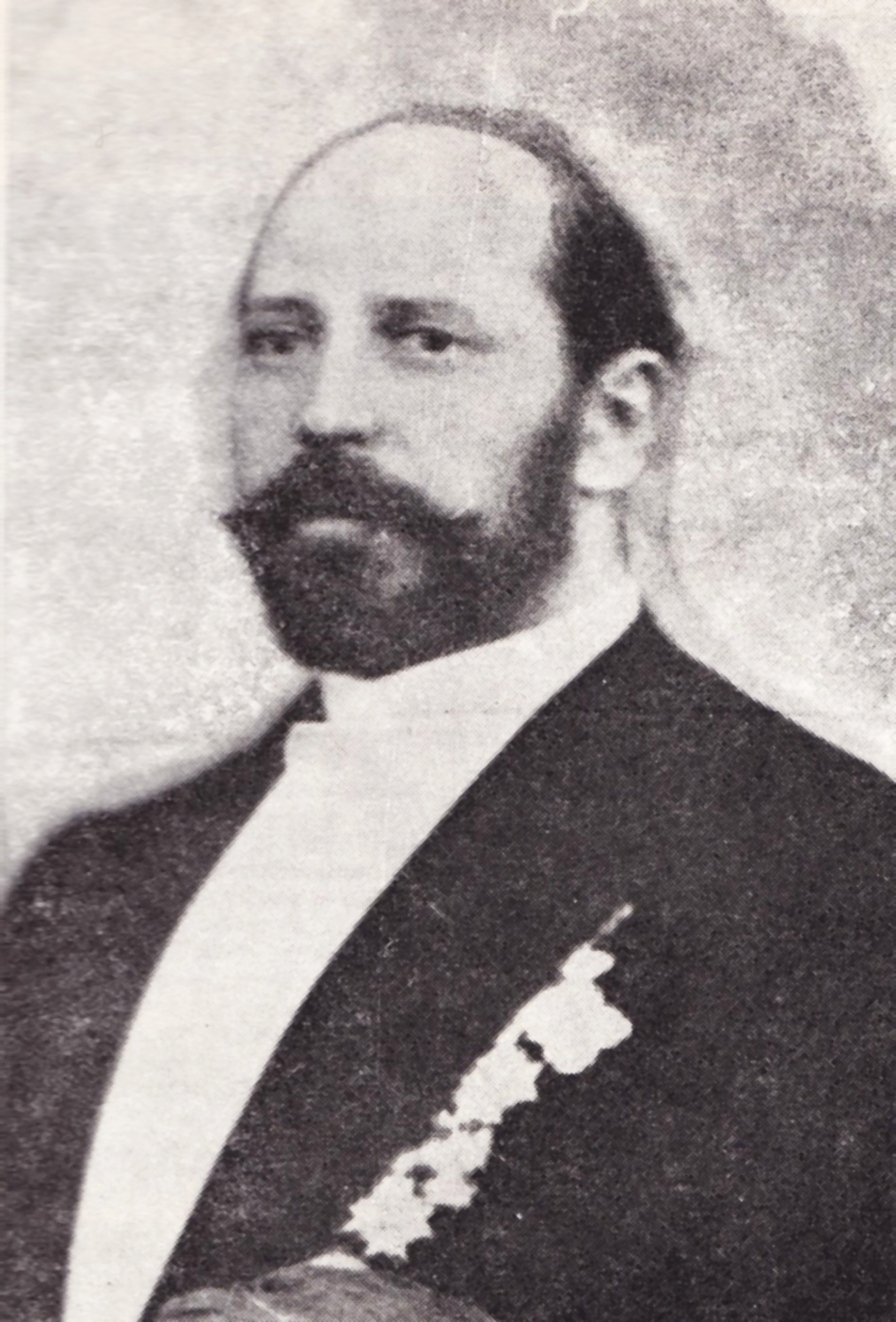
Jean Alexandru Steriadi

Jean Alexandru Steriadi (29 October 1880 – 23 November 1956) was a Romanian painter and drawing artist. He made portraits and compositions based on a strong, expressive drawing; then he evolved towards impressionistic influenced landscapes in which the subtle harmony is combined with a refined sense of picturesque ("The Morizzi House", "Ships in the Brăila Harbour"). Jean Alexandru Steriadi was a titular member of the Romanian Academy from 1948.

== Gallery ==
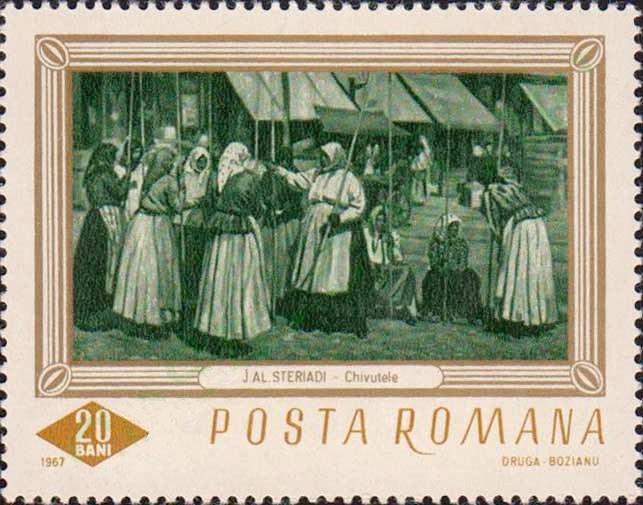
The Whitewashers

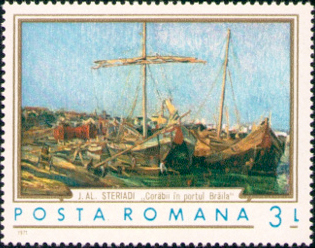
Corăbii in portul Brăila

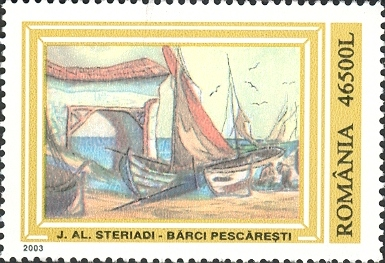
Bărci pescărești
