= Alexandru Ciucurencu =

Romanian artist (1903–1977)

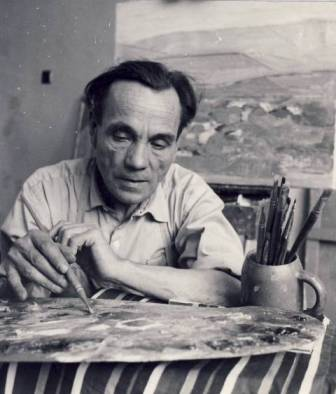
- Born: 27 September 1903; Tulcea, Kingdom of Romania
- Died: 27 December 1977 (aged 74); Bucharest, Socialist Republic of Romania
- Education: Bucharest National University of Arts; Académie Julian
- Known for: Painting
- Movement: Post-Impressionism
- Awards: Order of the Star of the Romanian Socialist Republic

Alexandru Ciucurencu (Romanian pronunciation: [alekˈsandru tʃjukuˈrenku]; 27 September 1903 – 27 December 1977) was a Romanian Post-Impressionist painter, and a corresponding member of the Romanian Academy.

Born in Tulcea, he studied from 1921 to 1926 at the National School of Fine Arts in Bucharest, where he had as teachers George Demetrescu Mirea and Camil Ressu. After making his debut in 1930 at the Official Salon in Bucharest, he worked with a group of artists in Baia Mare, and then went to Paris to pursue his studies at the Académie Julian, where he was a student of André Lhote. In 1948, he became a professor at the School of Fine Arts, and in 1963 he was elected corresponding member of the Romanian Academy.

Ciucurencu was awarded the Order of the Star of the Romanian Socialist Republic — 3rd class in 1959 and 2nd class in 1971.

A collection of Ciucurencu's paintings can be seen in Frasier Crane's apartment in Frasier.
