= Eustațiu Stoenescu =

Romanian painter

Eustațiu Stoenescu (Craiova, 1884-New York City, 1957) was a Romanian painter principally known for his portraiture. Eustatiu Stoenescu family originated from Oltenia in Romania. His father was a senator and his mother Mathilda was born in Brittany. Stoenescu met the French painter Leopold Durangel in 1889. He moved to Paris in 1900, with his friend Nicolae Titulescu.

Stoenescu was, early on, inspired by the work of Jean-Paul Laurens with whom he studied. His first exhibition took place in 1905 at the Salon officiel de Paris, and the same year in Craiova. He was immediately successful and had the opportunity to meet prestigious artists such as Auguste Rodin, Antoine Bourdelle, Henri Harpignies and Charles Cottet. By 1930 he was considered in French art circles to be the greatest living Romanian painter at the time. He was a great portraitist not only capable of showing the physical resemblance of the model but also the psychological dimension. He went many times in Brittany where he painted landscapes, especially in Loctudy.

His remains are in the "cimetière parisien d'Ivry", near Paris, in Ivry-sur-Seine.
