= Ion Frunzetti =

Romanian art historian, poet and translator

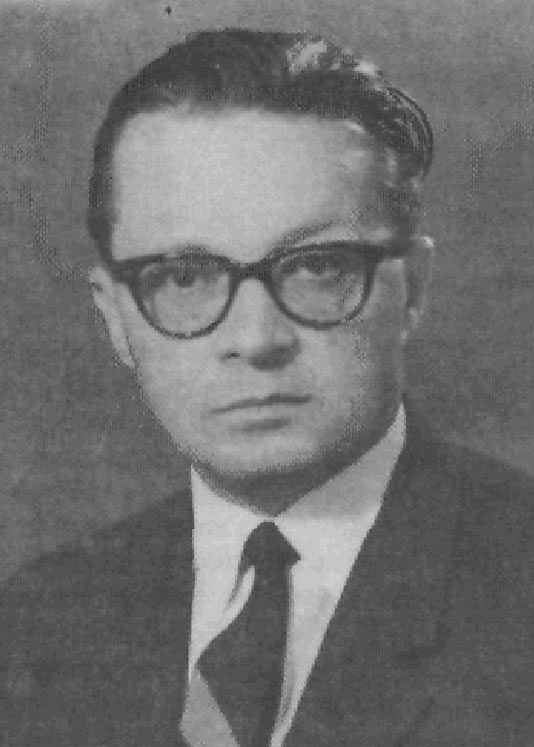
Ion Frunzetti

Ion Frunzetti (1918–1985) was a Romanian art critic and historian. He was vice president of the Union of Fine Artists, head of the Literature and Arts Section of the Academy of Social and Political Sciences, professor at Bucharest's Nicolae Grigorescu Fine Arts Institute and, for a time, director of the Institute of Art History and of Editura Meridiane.
