= Horia Bernea =

Romanian painter

- Born: 14 September 1938; Bucharest
- Died: 4 December 2000 (aged 62); Paris
- Occupation: Painter

Horia Bernea (14 September 1938, Bucharest – 4 December 2000, Paris) was a Romanian painter, who is considered part of the Neo-Orthodox Movement. Between 1990 and 2000, he was director of the Museum of the Romanian Peasant (Muzeul Țăranului Român, MȚR).

His father was the sociologist and ethnographer Ernest Bernea.
