= Lucian Grigorescu =

Romanian painter

Lucian Grigorescu (Romanian pronunciation: [lutʃiˈan ɡriɡoˈresku]; 1 February 1894, Medgidia – 28 October 1965, Bucharest) was a Romanian post-impressionist painter.

He graduated from the Mircea cel Bătrân High School in Constanța. In 1948, he was elected corresponding member of the Romanian Academy.
