= Horia Damian =

Romanian painter and sculptor (1922–2012)

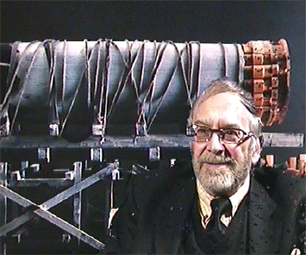
Horia Damian

Horia Damian (Bucharest, 27 Feb 1922 – Paris 14 May 2012) was a Romanian painter and sculptor.

== Biography ==
Damian enrolled at the School of Architecture in Bucharest in 1941. In that same year he made his debut at the Salonul Oficial de Pictură at Sala Dalles in Bucharest. His first one-man show took place at the Romanian Athenaeum in Bucharest in 1942. He was awarded the Anastase Simu Prize for painting. In 1946, he won a scholarship to Paris, where he later settled.

After a few months with André Lhote he worked with Daniel Lager in 1949–50 and then studied with Auguste Herbin, becoming acquainted with Piet Mondrian's work through Felix del Marle (1889–1952). This encounter with abstract art led to his first truly original paintings, such as Starry Night, which consists of a geometric arrangement of white dots.

He destroyed most of the works he produced during the second half of the 1950s, an experimental period for him. His works of the early 1960s, executed in oil on a polyester base, are in a gestural, impasto style close to Tachism, as in Constellation.

By the late 1960s, his work had become increasingly geometric and sculptural, as exemplified by the Throne series; these are not free-standing sculptures, but rather set against plain backgrounds. The first of his large-scale monuments, Galaxy, a project for a Monument at Houston, Texas, was designed in 1972 and constructed in 1974 at the Neue Galerie in Aachen. Several further monuments in the Galaxy series were constructed, others remaining as maquettes. His fascination with the monumental continued in The Hill, constructed for the Solomon R. Guggenheim Museum in New York from styrofoam covered with tiny paper spheres and then painted yellow. This was followed by similar monuments, such as that for San Francisco, which is illustrated in the gouache Project for San Francisco. In 1987, he was awarded the Ordre des Arts et des Lettres, Knight rank.

Horia Damian was featured in numerous solo and group exhibitions, including recent presentations such as:

2026: Group exhibition in Brussels, Belgium: Hidden Treasures of the Neo-Avant-Garde: The Trestieni Collection Unveiled

2019: Group exhibition at S.M.A.K. Stedelijk Museum voor Actuele Kunst in Ghent, Belgium: We Should believe in Our Time

== Bibliography ==
- The Solomon R. Guggenheim Museum, Horia Damian – The Hill, New York, 1976
- Documenta 1992, catalog, Kassel, 1992
- Grigorescu, Dan, Dicționarul avangardelor, Editura enciclopedică, București, 2003, p. 171-172
- Jianu, Ionel, Artiști români în Occident, București, 2005, p. 57
- Akoun, J.A., La cote des peintres, Paris, 2004
- Dictionnaire de l’art moderne et contemporaine, Ed. Hazan, Paris, 1992
- Florea, Vasile, Arta românească modernă și contemporană, Ed. Meridiane, București, 1982
- Prut, Constantin, Dicționar de artă modernă și contemporană, Ed. Univers Enciclopedic, București, 2002
- Prut, Constantin, Dictionar de artă modernă, Editura Albatros, București, 1983, p. 107-10
