= Dumitru Ghiață =

Romanian landscape painter

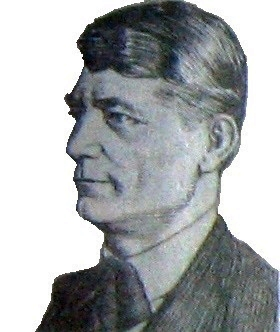

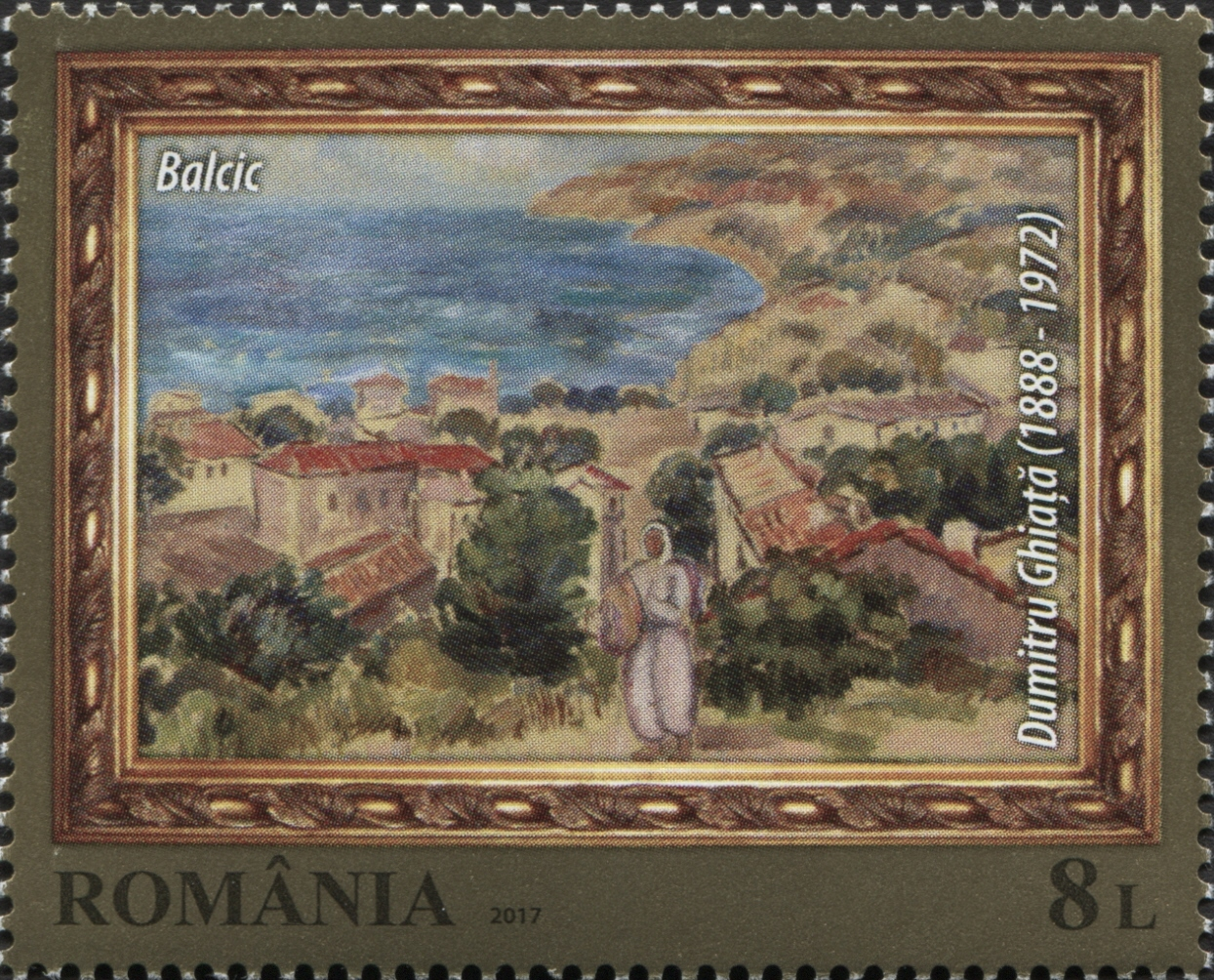
Balchik by Ghiață

Dumitru Ghiață (22 September 1888 – 3 July 1972) was a Romanian landscape painter. He painted still life depictions of flowers and compositions in a simple, direct, sober coloured style, in a synthetic drawing recalling folk traditions ("Peasants at the Fair", "Winter at Târgoviște", "Autumn in the Woods").

Ghiață was born in Colibași, a village now part of Malovăț commune, Mehedinți County.
