= Neculai Păduraru =

Romanian sculptor and painter (born 1946)

Neculai Păduraru (born 1946) is a Romanian sculptor and painter.

He studied at the Institute of Fine Art in Bucharest under Paul Vasilescu, graduating in 1975. Păduraru belonged to a generation of sculptors that reacted to Constantin Brâncuși’s work with a figurative vision inspired by ancient Mediterranean sculpture. Paduraru drew upon mythological literature and folklore for his subject-matter.
