= Ion Jalea =

Romanian sculptor and medallist (1887-1983)

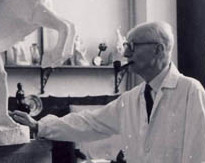
- Jalea in his studio
- Born: July 19, 1887; Casimcea, Tulcea County, Kingdom of Romania
- Died: November 7, 1983 (aged 96); Bucharest, Socialist Republic of Romania
- Education: Bucharest National University of Arts; Académie Julian
- Known for: Sculpture
- Notable work: Resting Archer; Statue of George Enescu; Statue of Carmen Sylva; Dragoș and the bison
- Awards: Order of the Star of the Romanian Socialist Republic; Hero of Socialist Labour
- Elected: Titular member of the Romanian Academy

Ion Jalea (Romanian pronunciation: [iˈon ˈʒale̯a]; 19 May 1887 – 7 November 1983) was a Romanian sculptor, monumentalist, teacher, and member of the Romanian Academy.

He fought in the First World War and lost his left hand in battle. Despite this challenge, he continued to sculpt with his right hand for the rest of his life.

== Biography ==
=== Artistic studies ===
Jalea was born on 19 May 1887 in the small town of Casimcea, Tulcea County. His family moved in 1893 to the village of Ciocârlia de Jos. Jalea attended the Mircea cel Bătrân High School in Constanța. He went on to continue his studies at the School of Arts and Crafts (in Romanian, Școala de Arte și Meserii) and, from 1909, at the National University of Arts in Bucharest, where he was the pupil of the renowned Romanian sculptors Frederic Storck and Dimitrie Paciurea. In May 1915, Jalea held his first solo exhibition.

In 1916, his artistic education was pursued in Paris at the Académie Julian. During this time, he had the opportunity to work alongside Henri Coandă as apprentice in sculpture in Auguste Rodin's atelier, after which he continued his studies at Antoine Bourdelle's studio.

=== World War I ===
After Romania entered World War I in August 1916 on the side of the Allies, Jalea returned home. In 1917, he volunteered to join the Romanian Army, and fought in a series of battles on the Moldavian front, at Corbu, Măxineni, and Nămoloasa. On August 17, 1917, he was severely wounded. After being treated at Galați and then Iași, doctors managed to save his left foot, but his left arm had to be amputated next to the shoulder. For his valor, he was decorated with the Romanian Order of the Crown, Knight rank, and the French Croix de Guerre, which was conferred to him by general Henri Mathias Berthelot.

=== Career ===
Following his recovery, despite having lost an arm, Jalea demonstrated unwavering devotion to the art of sculpture, as he had done before. Utilising only his right arm, he rose to fame as a renowned sculptor, achieving his greatest works following his amputation.

Jalea's talents were recognised on an international level, as evidenced by his accolades at prominent events such as the 1929 Barcelona International Exposition, where he received a prize. His contributions to the monument Romania and its provinces earned him one of the Grand Prizes at the Paris Exhibition of 1937. In addition, he participated in the 1939 New York World's Fair, further establishing his reputation as a skilled sculptor.

In 1932, he was appointed as a professor at the Bucharest National University of Arts, and in 1942 he was appointed director at the Ministry of Arts.

=== Sculptures ===
During his long artistic career, Jalea authored numerous monuments, statues, busts, reliefs, and allegorical compositions. His primary goal in these works was to highlight significant noteworthy events or personalities. Demonstrating a fusion of sculptural and pictorial elements, Jalea's technique was heavily influenced by Paciurea and Rodin. He also incorporated a rigorous sense of spatial arrangement, complemented by the balanced and harmonious use of shapes, a trademark of Bourdelle's style.

- Fall of Angels and Fall of Lucifer, 1915.
- Monument of the CFR heroes, done in 1923 together with Cornel Medrea and displayed at Gara de Nord in Bucharest.
- Hercules and the Centaur, 1925, displayed in Herăstrău Park.
- Resting Archer, 1926, at the Ion Jalea Museum in Constanța.
- Bas-reliefs from the Mausoleum of Mărășești, done in 1930 together with Medrea.
- Statue of Spiru Haret, 1935, in University Square, Bucharest.
- Statue of Dumitru Brezulescu, 1936, at Novaci; destroyed in 1948.
- Several sculptures from the facades of Arcul de Triumf, 1936.
- Statue of Queen Elisabeth (Carmen Sylva), 1937, at Constanța.
- Bust of Mihai Eminescu, 1943, in Cișmigiu Gardens.
- Bust of Octavian Goga, 1943, in Cișmigiu Gardens; destroyed after 1944 and replaced by a bust of Ion Creangă.
- Bust of Leon Ghelerter, 1946, at the "Love of People" hospital in Bucharest.
- Statue of George Enescu, 1971, in front of the Romanian National Opera, Bucharest.
- Equestrian statue of Mircea I of Wallachia, 1972, at Tulcea.
- Bust of Theodor Rogalski, at Romanian Radio Broadcasting Company.
- Statues Hammer Thrower and Mother and Schoolchild, 1977, at Suceava.
- Equestrian statue of Decebalus, 1978, at Deva.
- Dragoș and the Bison monument, 1978, at Câmpulung Moldovenesc.
- Two statues called Workers at Giulești Theatre, Bucharest

=== Coin design ===
In 1935, he designed the 250 lei coin, which features the Coat of arms of the Kingdom of Romania and the Effigy of King Carol II.

=== Awards and distinctions ===
In 1941, Jalea received the Romanian National Prize for sculpture. In 1948, he was elected corresponding member of the Romanian Academy, and in 1955, he was promoted to titular member of the academy. In 1956, he became President of the Union of Romanian Plastic Artists. In 1966, he was awarded the Order of Cultural Merit, first class, for the sculpture Hercules and the Centaur. In 1962, he was awarded the Order of the Star of the Romanian People's Republic, first class, while in 1971, he was awarded the title of Hero of Socialist Labour and the "Hammer and Sickle" medal.

== Legacy ==
The Ion Jalea Museum of Sculpture is located in Constanța, close to the Casino. The building, designed by the architect Victor Ștefănescu after World War I, was turned in a museum in 1968, when Jalea donated to the city part of his private art collection. After his death, the collection was completed with sculptures donated by his family, arriving at a total of 227 works of art.
