= Henri Catargi =

Romanian painter

Henri Catargi (December 6, 1894, Bucharest, Romania – July 19, 1976, Bucharest) was a renowned Romanian painter from Braşov.

== Biography ==
Born on December 6, 1894, in Bucharest, Henri Catargi would eventually become one of the top Romanian artists, a major influence in the national 20th century world of arts and an inspiration for many young generations of Romanian painters, as the one who tried to bring the European - and especially French - influences into traditional Romanian art. But if many before and after him did just that, Catargi managed to create an original and profoundly personal style, easily recognizable.

He settled in Paris in 1919 and until 1922 he studied art at the Académie Julian and Academie Ranson, under several important teachers of his time such as Maurice Denis and Édouard Vuillard. At that time, he worked in an intense manner by himself, and discovered at the Louvre Museum the works of Poussin, his main influence at that time, which he copied and discovered time and time again. At first, his themes were fairly limited, mainly landscapes, while his style was in no small part marked by the Romantic traditions. In time his style developed to a much more modern one, even creating an impression of three dimensions in his works. It was Catargi's way of adapting to the new art, in a much more realistic fashion.

During this time frame the main interest for Henri Catargi was color, with all of its nuances, although at first he mainly used brown, ochre, white, grey, green and dark red, with several variations. A rather limited palette of colors, but it made his works all the more interesting. Later, after 1930, he started incorporating more colors in his compositions and also began to emphasize important elements with thick, black lines - an interesting idea that built several "attention landmarks" in his paintings. By putting something in the front of the whole ensemble, Catargi managed to surprise and impress.

He also produced an impressive number of sketches and drawings, in ink or crayon, as well as in watercolor, mainly landscapes and female figures, at the same time becoming much more popular both in his country and in Europe. He died in 1976 in Bucharest, leaving behind one of the richest selection of works ever put together by a Romanian artists.

== Sources ==
- http://www.artline.ro/ (For research purposes only)

== Paintings (selection) ==
- Port de plaisance, oil/canvas, 33x46 cm
- Paysage méditerranéen, oil/canvas, 53x64 cm
- Paysage de bord de mer, oil/canvas, 53x64 cm
- Paysage marin, oil/canvas, 54x65 cm
