= Iosif Iser =

Romanian painter and graphic artist

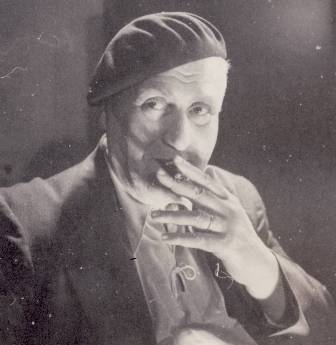
- Born: 21 May 1881; Câmpulung Muscel
- Died: 25 April 1958 (aged 76); Bucharest
- Known for: Painting
- Movement: Expressionism

Iosif Iser (21 May 1881 – 25 April 1958; born and died in Bucharest) was a Romanian painter and graphic artist.

Born to a Jewish family in Bucharest who later moved to Ploieşti, he was initially inspired by Expressionism, creating drawings with thick, unmodulated, lines and steep angles. After studies in Munich, he returned briefly to Ploieşti before moving to Bucharest, where he exhibited in the Tinerimea Artistică show of 1905. After further study in Paris (with, among others, André Derain), he returned in 1909 and promptly organized the first exhibit of modern art at the Romanian Athenaeum, including some of Derain's works as well as his own.

Iser worked for the socialist press (Facla and the original version of Adevărul), publishing a large number of caricatures (most of them satirising the Romanian Monarchy). He also started his first series of paintings with Dobrujan themes, usually featuring local Tatar portraits.

Around 1920, Iosif Iser adopted a more luminous range of colours, while softening the textures. He continued his "Tatar" themes with his Tătăroaică în albastru ("Tatar Woman in Blue") and Famile de tătari ("Tatar Family"). He expanded on another series, one that depicted harlequins.

He traveled extensively in the interwar years: the Dobruja region along the Black Sea, entirely within Romania at that time, now shared roughly equally with Bulgaria; several more years in Paris; at least some time in Berlin where he exhibited at the Secession Exhibition of 1926; and also travels in Spain. Despite the wartime persecutions of Romanian Jews, his work was included in a 1943 show "Light and Color", which also featured Gheorghe Petraşcu and Alexandru Ciucurencu.

He continued to paint in the postwar years, showing in New York City (1948), the Venice Biennale (1954), Moscow and Leningrad (1956), and Vienna (1957).

In 1955, he was elected a full member of the Romanian Academy.
