= Cornel Medrea =

Romanian sculptor

- Born: March 8, 1888; Miercurea Sibiului, Austria-Hungary
- Died: July 25, 1964 (aged 76); Bucharest, Romania
- Resting place: Bellu Cemetery; 44°24′28.55″N 26°05′50.27″E
- Education: Hungarian University of Fine Arts
- Awards: National Prize for Sculpture; State Prize of the Romanian People's Republic; People's Artist
- Elected: Corresponding member of the Romanian Academy

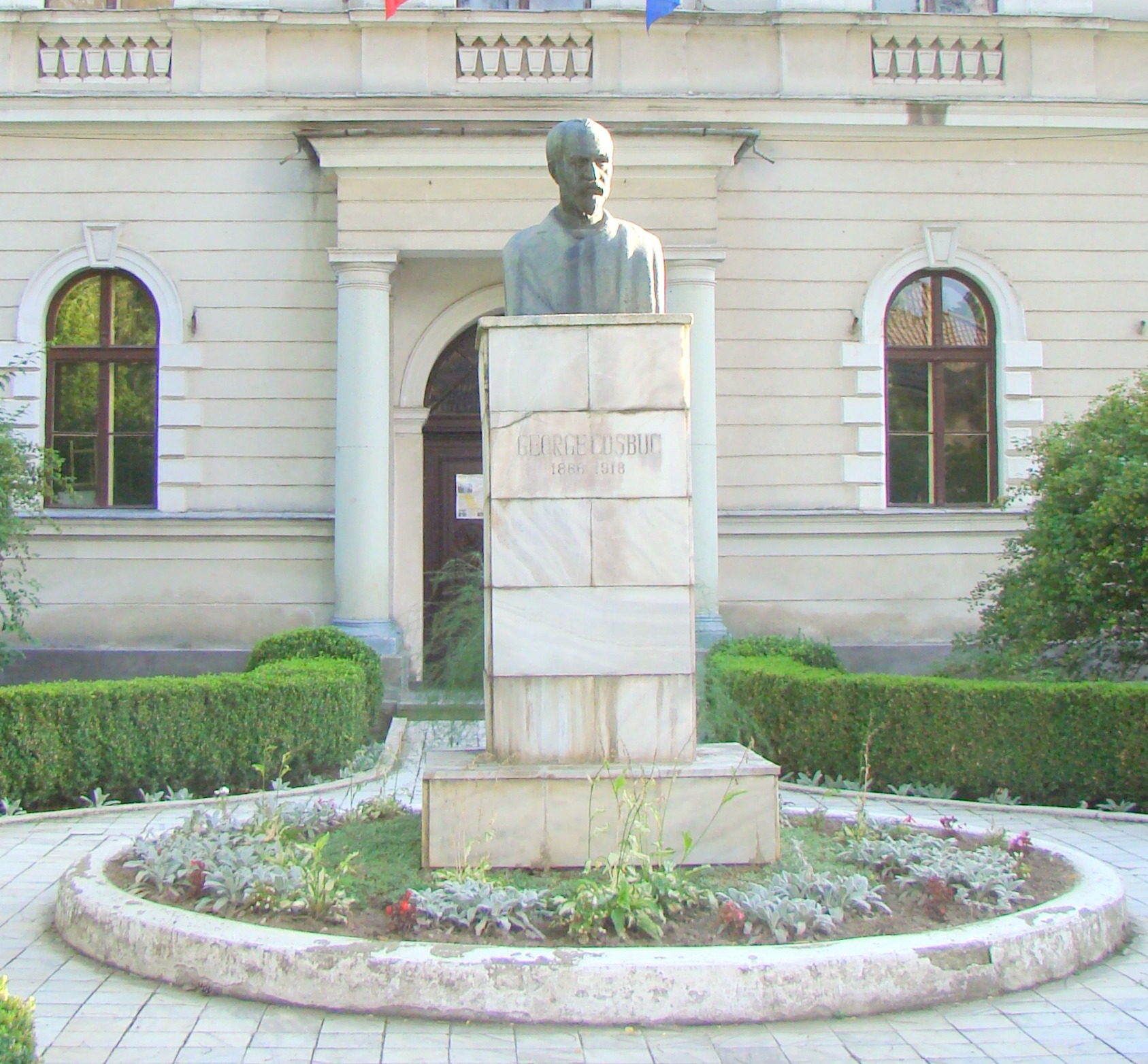
Bust of George Coșbuc at Năsăud

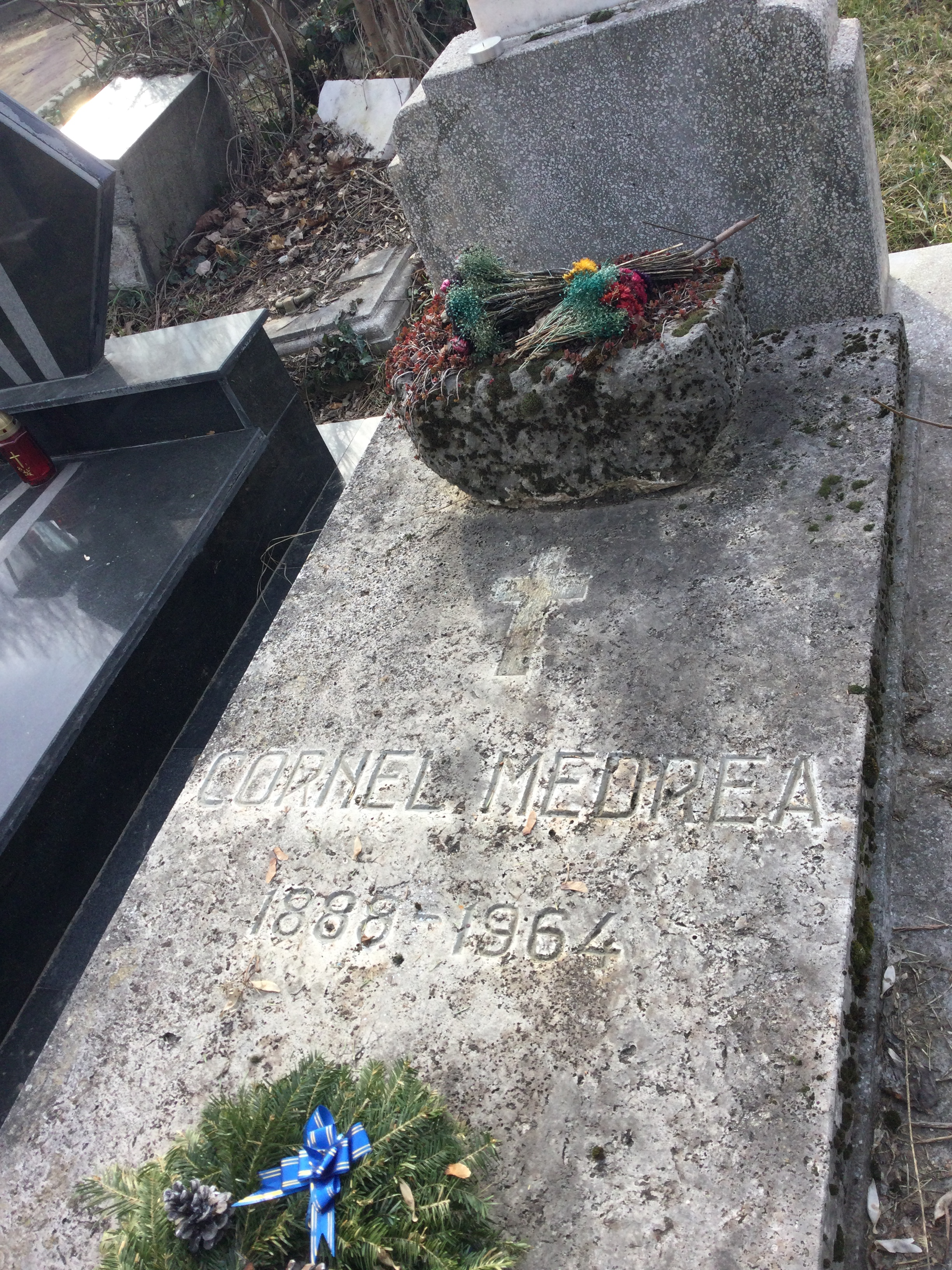
Grave in Bellu Cemetery

Cornel Medrea (Romanian pronunciation: [korˈnel ˈmedre̯a]; March 8, 1888–July 25, 1964) was a Romanian sculptor.

== Biography ==
=== Artistic studies ===
He was born on March 8, 1888, in Miercurea Sibiului, then in Szeben County, Kingdom of Hungary, now Sibiu County, Romania. After moving with his family to Alba Iulia and attending the local school, he went from 1905–1909 to study at an art school in Zlatna, and in 1909–1912 at the Hungarian University of Fine Arts in Budapest. After spending a year traveling by foot to visit the museums in Vienna, Dresden, Leipzig, and Munich, he returned home. In 1914 he participated in an exhibit in Bucharest, and completed a bust of George Coșbuc, which is displayed in Sibiu. Towards the end of the year he decided to leave Transylvania and moved to Bucharest.

=== Career ===
On November 11, 1933, he was named professor at the Bucharest National University of Arts, filling the position left vacant after the death of Dimitrie Paciurea; Medrea held this position until 1964. In 1955 he was elected corresponding member of the Romanian Academy. One of his former students was the sculptor Claudia Cobizev.

=== Sculptures ===
Some of the statues of Medrea depict well-known personalities, such as Aristide Demetriade in the role Hamlet (1919, at the National Theatre Bucharest), Avram Iancu (1927, at Câmpeni), Ovid (1927, Șoseaua Kiseleff, Bucharest), Ioan Rațiu (1929, Turda), Andrei Mureșanu (1932, Bistrița), Vasile Lucaciu (1932, Satu Mare).

He also sculpted busts of Molière and Victor Hugo (1919, National Theatre Bucharest), Barbu Ștefănescu Delavrancea (1920, Șoseaua Kiseleff), Ștefan Octavian Iosif (one from 1926 at Brașov and the other at Cișmigiu Gardens in Bucharest), Traian Lalescu (1930, Timișoara), Mihai Eminescu (1938, Giurgiu), Gheorghe Lazăr (1938, Avrig), Vasile Nașcu (1947 and 1967, Năsăud), George Coșbuc (1956, Năsăud), Elena Cernei (1962, private collection), and Margareta Pâslaru (1962, Suțu Palace, Bucharest).

Together with Ion Jalea he sculpted in 1923 the Monument of the CFR heroes (which stands in front of the Bucharest North railway station), and in 1930 the bas-reliefs surrounding the dome of the Mausoleum of Mărășești.

Medrea's late work includes the statuary groups Fishermen (1959) and Child with turtle (1962), both at Constanța.

=== Awards ===
Medrea won numerous awards, including Honorary Diploma at the Barcelona International Exhibition, 1929; Great Prize at the Paris International Exhibition, 1937; International Prize at the New York Exhibition, 1939; National Prize for Sculpture, 1945; State Prize, 1956; People's Artist, 1957.

=== Death and legacy ===
He died in Bucharest on July 25, 1964, and was buried at Bellu Cemetery. The Museum of Bucharest Municipality (located in the Suțu Palace) houses the "Cornel Medrea Collection," which was developed through a series of donations. The initial donation from 1948 featured 118 paintings and 38 sketches, and was exhibited for a few years at the Mogoșoaia Palace. The collection now features 384 sculptures and drawings; since 2007, some of its most representative pieces have been on display at the Palace of the Parliament.
