= Dimitrie Paciurea =

Romanian sculptor (1875–1932)

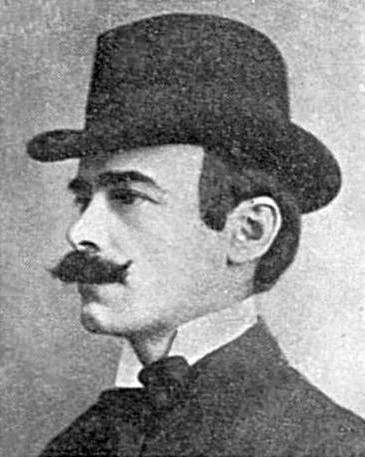
Dimitrie Paciurea

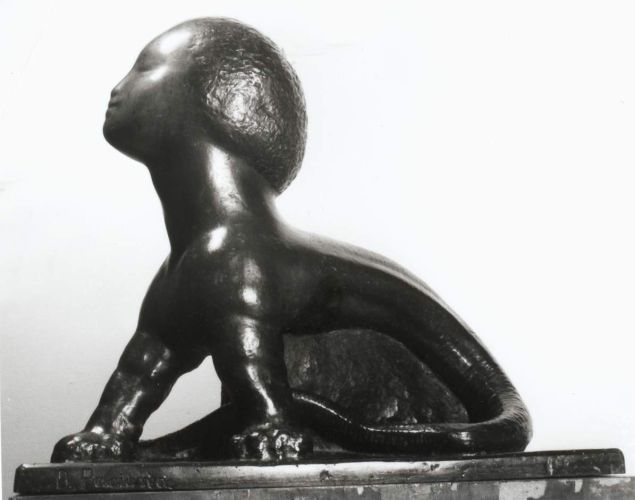
Chimera of the Earth

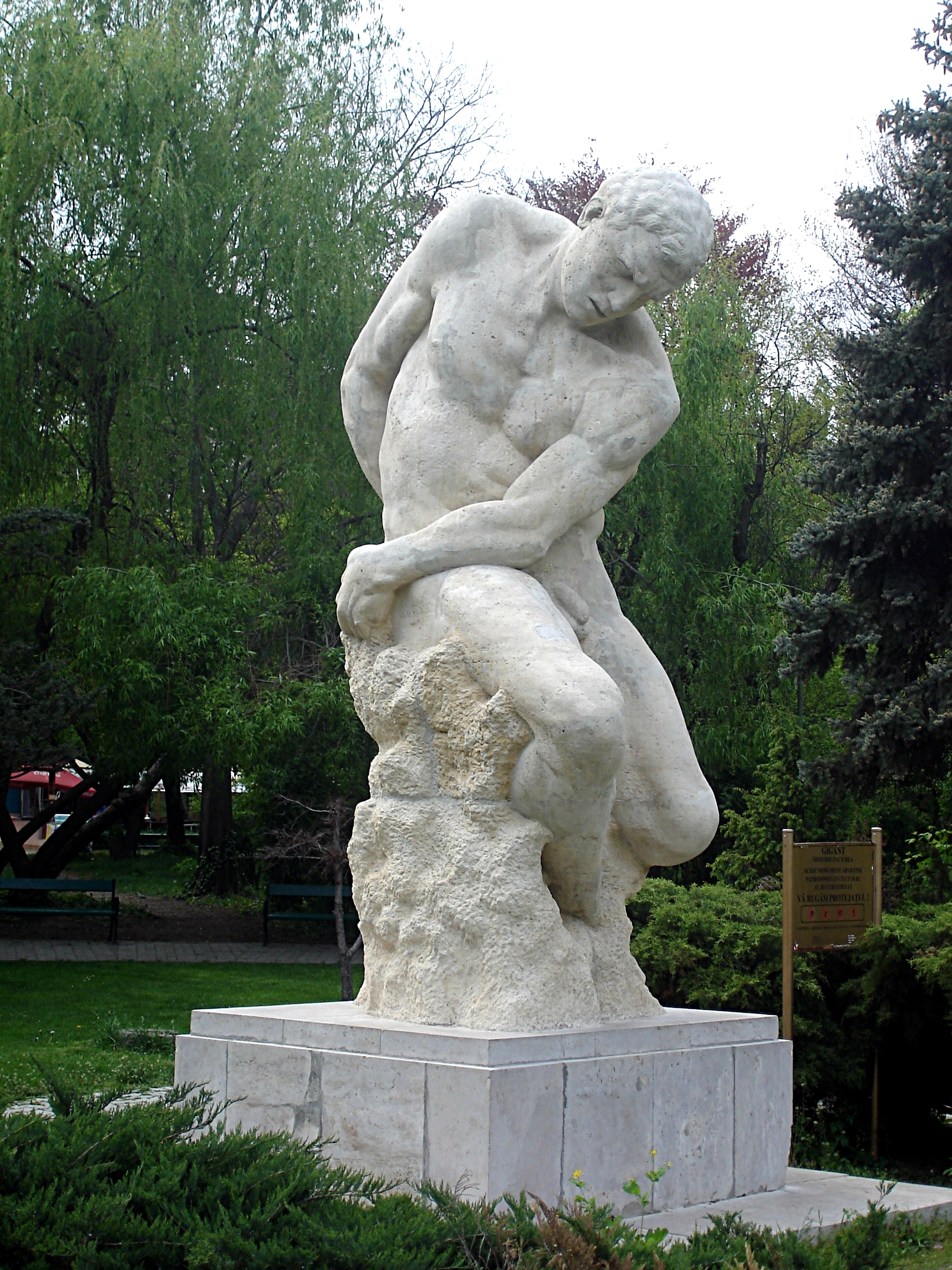
Giant – at Carol Park

Dimitrie Paciurea (Romanian pronunciation: [diˈmitri.e paˈt͡ʃjure̯a]; (2 November 1875 – 14 July 1932) was a Romanian sculptor. His representational and symbolic style contrasts strongly to the more abstract style of his contemporary and co-national Constantin Brâncuși.

Born in Bucharest, he attended the Matei Basarab High School. He then studied at the National School of Fine Arts in Bucharest (1890–1894), and later in Paris (1896–1900).

In 1909 he was named professor at the National School of Fine Arts. Paciurea was one of the founders of the Romanian Art Society (1919). His students include Cornel Medrea, Ion Jalea, and Oscar Han. A room of the Romanian National Art Museum is devoted largely to his Chimera sculptures.

== Birthdate ==
Dimitrie's birth year is uncertain:

- Oscar Han, Sculptorul Dimitrie Paciurea, Bucharest, 1935, p. 7, gives Paciurea's birth year as 1875.
- George Oprescu, Sculptura Româneasca, Bucharest, 1965, p. 93, lists 1875
- Ion Frunzetti, Paciurea, Bucharest, 1971, p. 12, date of birth as 2 November 1873.
- Mircea Deac, Paciurea, Bucharest, 2000, p. 5, date of birth as 2 November 1873.
