= Gheorghe Petrașcu =

Romanian painter

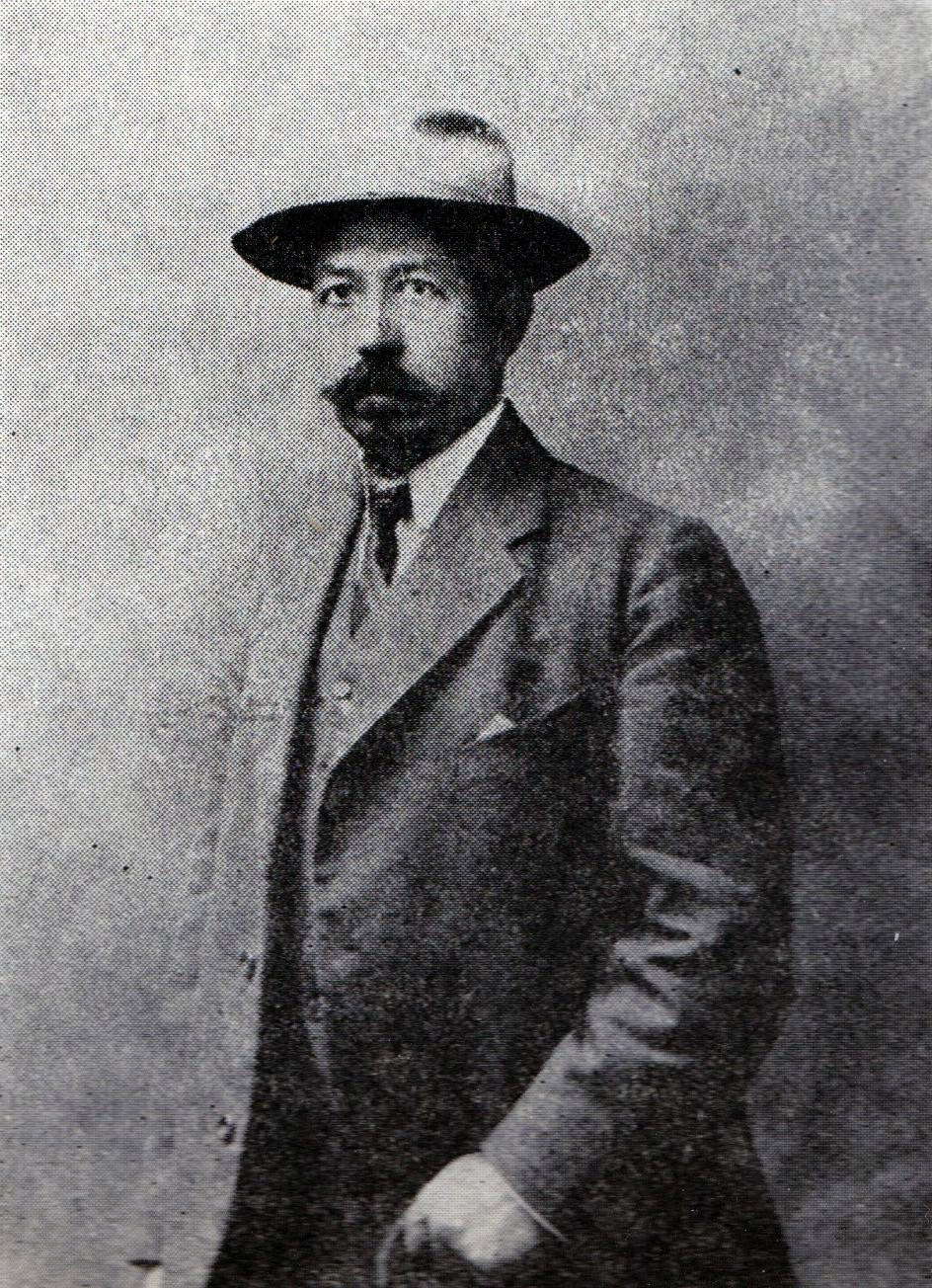
Gheorghe Petrașcu

Gheorghe Petrașcu (Romanian pronunciation: [ˈɡe̯orɡe peˈtraʃku]; 20 November 1872, Tecuci – 1 May 1949, Bucharest) was a Romanian painter. He won numerous prizes throughout his lifetime and had his paintings exhibited posthumously at the Paris International Exhibition and the Venice Biennale. He was the brother of N. Petrașcu, a literary critic and novelist.

In 1936, Petrașcu was elected a titular member of the Romanian Academy.

He was born in Tecuci, Romania, in a family with cultural traditions. His parents were small owners from Fălciu County, Costache Petrovici-Rusciucliu and his wife Elena, maiden name Bițu-Dumitriu. Brother of the diplomat, writer and literary and art critic Nicolae Petrașcu, Gheorghe Petrașcu showed artistic inclinations as a young man, doing his first studies at the National University of Arts in Bucharest. At the recommendation of Nicolae Grigorescu, he received a scholarship to improve abroad. After a short time in Munich, he left for Paris, where he enrolled at the Académie Julian and worked in Bouguereau's studio (1899–1902). From his first personal exhibition at the Romanian Athenaeum (1900), he was noticed by the writers Barbu Ștefănescu Delavrancea and Alexandru Vlahuță, who bought him a work.

With unbridled passion, he painted landscapes, both in the country (Sinaia, Târgu Ocna, Câmpulung-Muscel), and in France (Vitré, Saint-Malo), Spain (San Martin Bridge in Toledo) and especially in Italy (Venice, Chioggia, Naples). In his landscapes, light does not erase the contours as in the Impressionists. On the contrary, the rectilinear architectures are imposed by an impression of solidity. From this point of view, the Venetian landscapes best demonstrate Petrașcu's anticonformism. The artist resists traditional interpretations, in which the landscape of the city on the lagoon was only a pretext to analyze the interference of light vibrations, in eternal change on water, on colored walls and in the pure air.

For Petrașcu, Venice possessed grandeur, "with the brilliance of ancient relics, evoking the history of ancient palaces, with their serious and fascinating poetry." Petrașcu creates through a juxtaposition of faded red, with shades of blue, gray and brown. This successive overlap gives Petrașcu's paste an almost sculptural structure, the roughness of the color influences the regime of shadows and light as the accents of a relief. The self-portrait in the Zambaccian Museum seems to descend from the Italian Renaissance, of a solemn gravity but also with a note of sensuality.

In personal exhibitions, between 1903 and 1923 at the Romanian Athenaeum, then at the "Home of Art" (1926–1930), culminating with the two retrospectives at the "Sala Dalles" in 1936 and 1940. He participated in the Venice Biennale (1924, 1938 and 1940); he received the Grand Prize of the International Exhibition in Barcelona (1929) and the same in Paris (1937).

== Memorialistic, general considerations ==
Once the time had passed, the work that Gheorghe Petrașcu left to posterity, about three thousand paintings and many graphic works became a dowry of fine art on which all sorts of observations were made, all of them being different. Those who studied his work and valued his creation found that there is a lot of confusion and erroneous appreciation in his biography. There were minimizations, invectives and unjust criticisms, many persiflages but also truisms, benevolent platitudes, exaggerations and praise of circumstance. Critical analyzes have made essential and judicious references, often definitive. It is noteworthy that the early assessments that were validated by the late contemporaneity, remained equally valid today. The pertinent, sometimes subtle, remarks made by Ștefan Petică are telling in the conditions in which he did not have an overview of the Petrascian work. In the period before the First World War, there were penetrating comments by Apcar Baltazar, B. Brănișteanu (the literary pseudonym of Bercu Braunstein), N.D. Cocea, Marin Simionescu-Râmniceanu, Tudor Arghezi, Theodor Cornel (the literary pseudonym of Toma Dumitriu), Iosif Iser, Adrian Maniu, etc.

During the Interwar period, Francisc Șirato, Nicolae Tonitza, Nichifor Crainic made significant contributions, followed by George Oprescu, Oscar Walter Cisek, Alexandru Busuioceanu, Petru Comarnescu, Ionel Jianu, Lionello Venturi and Jacques Lassaigne. All of them made the effort to explain and understand the creation of the Romanian artist. It is noteworthy that in the press chronicle during the painter's lifetime, the same observations were made, repeated to satiety by dozens of commentators. The art historian Vasile Florea opined that even today the same appreciations are made by those who study Petrașcu's work, without knowing that they do it by rediscovering certain aspects that others have stated decades before. Florea was also has an opinion that the process of revealing the meanings of the artist's creation will be completed with great difficulty due to the vastness of the work and its rich meanings. In support of this opinion are the synthesis studies and monographs published after 1944 by Ionel Jianu, George Oprescu, Krikor Zambaccian, Tudor Vianu, Aurel Vladimir Diaconu, Eleonora Costescu, Eugen Crăciun and Theodor Enescu. According to Vasile Florea, the analysis of the artist's creation must be made on two levels: one of a Petrașcu in a continuous evolution through a slowness of movement and a steady one, characterized by immobility, which summarizes the first "... as ontogeny summarizes phylogeny".

== Socio-cultural affiliation ==
Gheorghe Petrașcu was born in Tecuci, Moldova. Tecuci was first mentioned in Iancu Rotisiavovici's deed in 1134. In Descriptio Moldavie, Dimitrie Cantemir mentioned the locality as "... the poor seat of two parishioners who are given the responsibility of this land". The geographical area in the middle of which it was established as a settlement gave it a distinct shape and a social and economic life that was defined over time as a separate entity.

"...Nothing has changed; nothing was ruined, nothing was added to the old town that sleeps shrouded in fog on the banks of the peaceful Bârlad. The same wide streets covered with gray pebbles stretch silently, in the dust that rises thin as a shadow of incense smoke spread in a ruined church. The same large and spacious courtyards, courtyards made for abundance and living life to the fullest, are pampered in their patriarchal appearance and the same small and simple houses resembling the comforting smile of old women show their modest faces under rustic roofs."
----- Ștefan Petică: Tecuciul removed. Autumn Notes, in Works, 1938, pp. 243–251

In a brief analysis of Petrașcu's work, it seems that he did not feel the rooting of the environment where he was born because the paintings, which he painted during trips through Romania, Europe or Egypt (Africa), do not lead to the birthplaces, although a few remained there. Without subscribing to the theory of geographical determinism supported by Hyppolyte Taine and Garabet Ibrăileanu, who stated the thesis according to which an artist owes to the space where the main features of his creation were born, one can discern in Gheorghe Petrașcu's works.

Regarding the composition of the personalities of Tecuci and the neighboring areas gave to the Romanian spirituality, Gheorghe Petrașcu was part of a socio-cultural enclave formed by many writers like Alexandru Vlahuță, Theodor Șerbănescu, Dimitrie C. Ollănescu-Ascanio, Alexandru Lascarov– Moldovanu, Nicolae Petrașcu (the artist's brother), Ion Petrovici, Ștefan Petică, Duiliu Zamfirescu and Dimitrie Anghel. All these writers differ from the exponents of the great Boerism who created junimism. They were closer to the ideals of the bourgeoisie and some like Stefan Petica or Dimitrie Anghel were ready to adopt radicalist doctrines. With Petică and Dimitrie Anghel, Petrașcu had a lot in common, all three being good friends.

There is not much information about the places where he was born and where he lived until adolescence. At the exhibition events that took place until 1916, the artist presented only a few landscapes that he painted in Nicorești and Coasta Lupii. Even in the evocations he made in the press of the time, he mentioned only essential biographical data. This syncope from the painter's biography can be supplemented by reading the writings by which Ștefan Petică, Calistrat Hogaș, Nicolae Petrașcu, Ioan Petrovici or Alexandru Lascarov-Moldovanu evoked the so-called "city of long sleep" invoked by Petică.

== Family ==
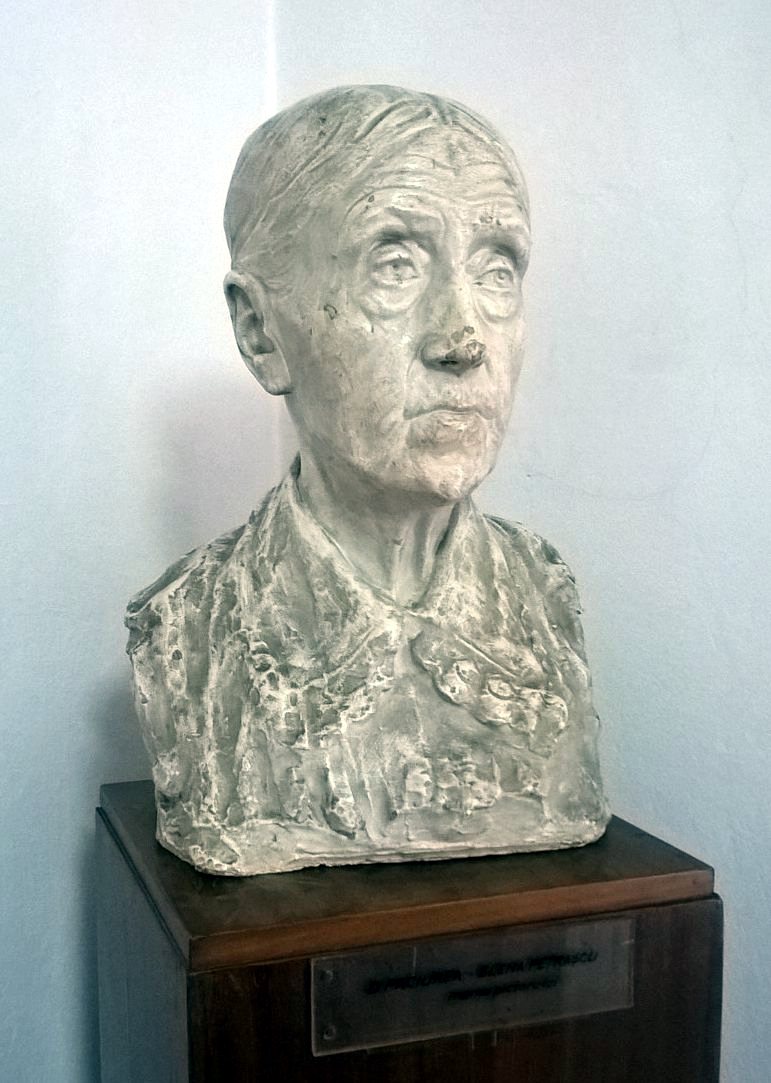
Elena Bițu–Dumitriu, bust made by Dimitrie Paciurea

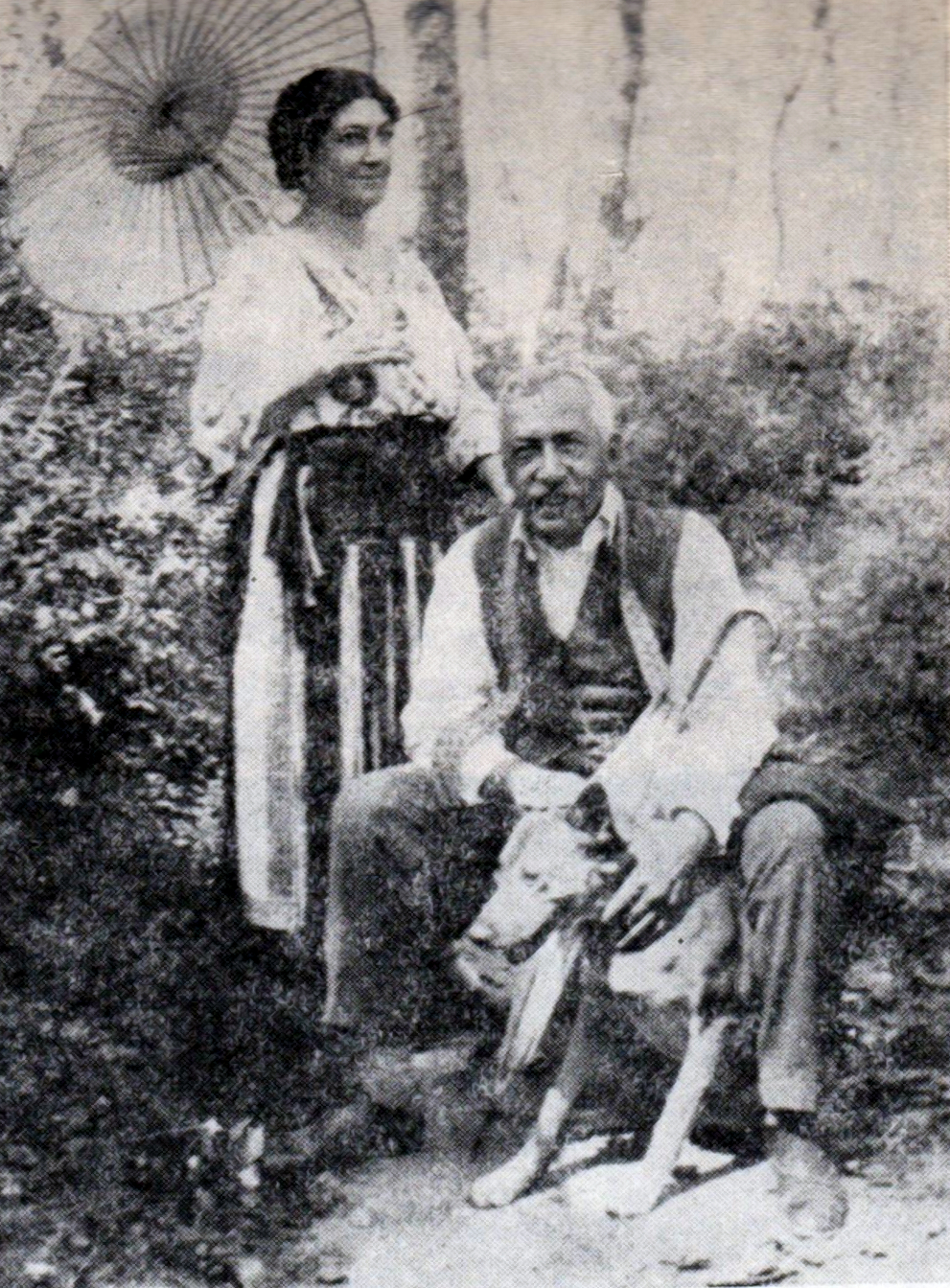
Gheorghe Petrașcu and his wife

Gheorghe Petrașcu, Iorgu as his relatives called him, was born into a wealthy family on 1 December 1872. As Nicolae Petrașcu stated, their parents were "... people without any education, not knowing how to speak Romanian, but, in their midst, important people, recognized by an exemplary morality." The father, Costache Petrovici, was nicknamed the Prophet by friends because he foresaw the weather. He was originally from Focșani and had settled in Tecuci as a result of his marriage to Elena, born Bițu-Dimitriu. "... He was a brown man, fit for stature, wise and balanced in all his deeds and words, caring for his clothes, with a burning desire to teach his children the book." His occupation was agriculture, in addition to the vineyard from Nicorești he also had an estate of 200 falce in Boghești, on the Zeletin valley, which was about five hours away with the Tecuci carriage.

To find out the artist's more distant origin, research must be done in the south Danube regions, George Călinescu stated that the painter's father's name was Costache Petrovici-Rusciucliu. A cousin of his Romanianized his name by calling him Petrașin, so that the last modification would be made by Nicolae, Gheorghe's brother, in Petrașcu. The linguist Iorgu Iordan, also born in Tecuci, seems to have known, in Vasile Florea's opinion, that the primary doctor of the city was Petrovici and has changed his name to Petraș.

Gheorghe Petrașcu did not know his father because the latter died shortly after the artist was born. Thus, his mother became a widow at the age of 36. Nicolae describes her as "... sensitive to music [her own property and that of her father, n.a. Vasile Florea], singing the lance whenever he passed from our room through the hall, to the living room, and with a kind of philosophy of it, spoken in short Romanian words, whose beauty sometimes amazes you." In old age, she was evoked by her cousin Ion Petrovici (probably the primary care physician, not Vasile Florea) who said that she was "... a weak and prematurely bleached old woman, funny almost unwittingly and who liked to hum, taking forced breaks only when he was with the world, so that when he was left alone for a moment, he would instantly resume a fashionable area." The inclination towards music was transmitted from his parents to Gheorghe Petrașcu, as he had a baritone voice, as his daughter remembered Mariana Petrașcu.

The Petrașcu brothers, Nicolae, Gheorghe and Vasile, being left without a father, were cared for a while by their older cousin Constantin Petrașcu (1842 – 1916 (?)). This was Carol Davila's favorite student. Constantin pursued a career as a politician, he was elected deputy and was appointed prefect. Due to his progressive beliefs, he was dismissed by the Conservative party of which he was a member. Gheorghe Petrașcu married in 1913 Lucreția C. Marinescu. He had two children, Mariana, the future graphic designer, and Gheorghe (Pichi) Petrașcu, who became an architect.

=== Parents' house ===
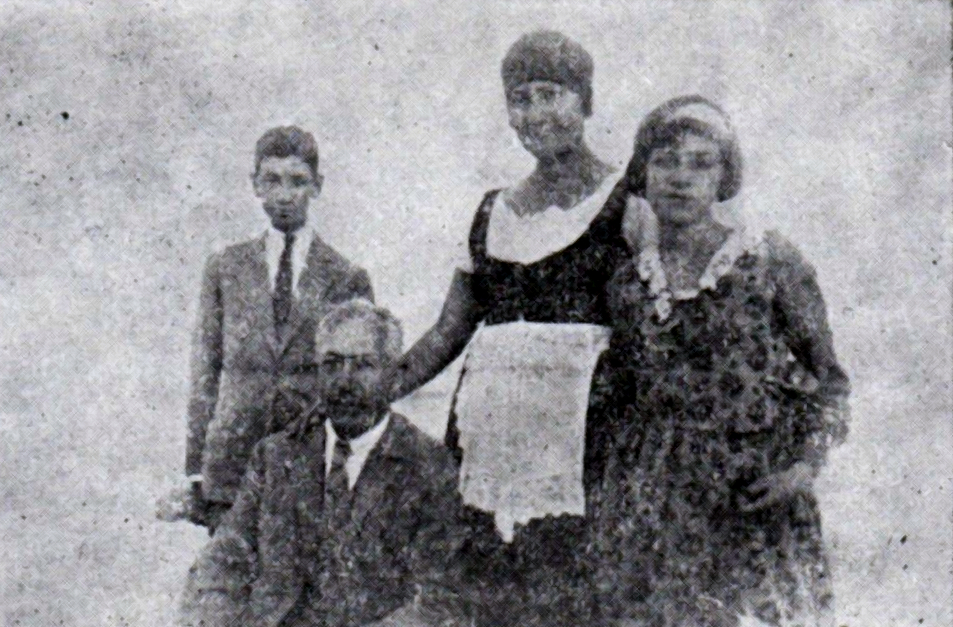
Gheorghe Petrașcu with his children and wife

Nicolae Petrașcu also wrote about his parents' house. It was "... in the middle of a large courtyard and had eight wall pillars in front, along a porch that I called a plateau [...]. Behind the house was the garden with apples and apricots, to its right the barn, the summer kitchen, the cellar, the stable, and the barn; to her left, at a short distance, flowed the water of Bârlad from which a cool breeze always blew ..." The interior of the house was evoked by the same memorialist who remembered his return to Tecuci in 1887, so "... the wall cushions on the two beds, placed side by side in our room in the middle, the white tulle curtains, the heavy iron box on which the beautiful Turkish rug was laid [..], and in the living room, the same six chairs walnut, lathe, the same two sofas, two mirrors two tables. . ." The house still existed in 1989, undergoing alterations after some damage that occurred during World War I.

=== Painter's houses ===
Gheorghe Petrașcu and his family lived for the first time in Bucharest on Căderea Bastiliei Street, former Cometa, no. 1, on the corner with Piața Romană. The building of his house was designed and built in 1912 by the architect Spiridon Cegăneanu in neo-Romanian style. The building is part of a set of three apartments that have a unitary facade and has been declared a historical monument. It was renovated between 1997 and 2000. In 2011, the building was leased by the Librarium bookstore group. The building has two floors, plus a basement, and the part of the house where Petrașcu lived, facing the ASE, has three levels and the artist's studio is on the top floor. Petrașcu lived here until 1927.

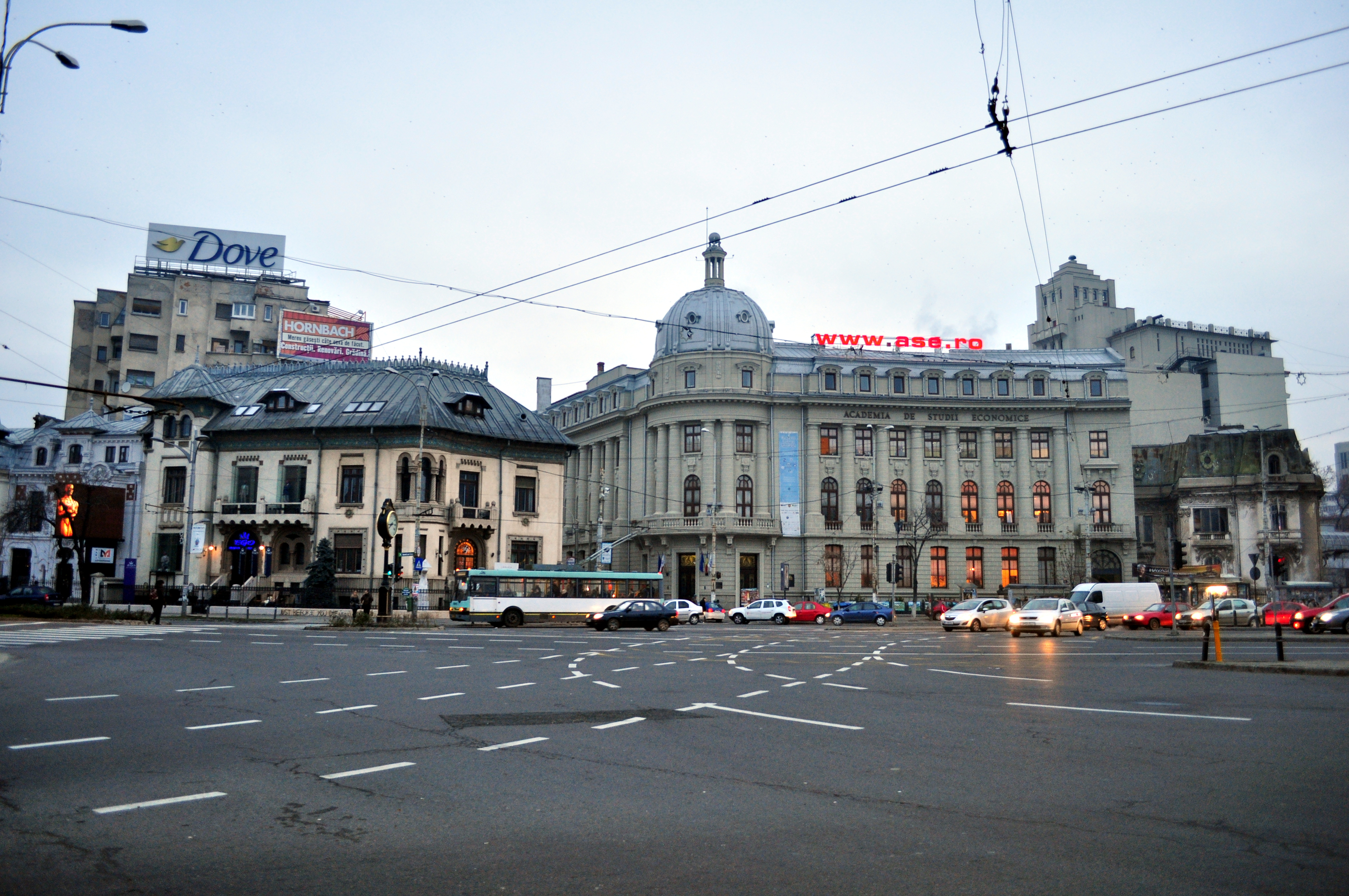
Petrașcu's house (on the left) and the ASE (on the right)

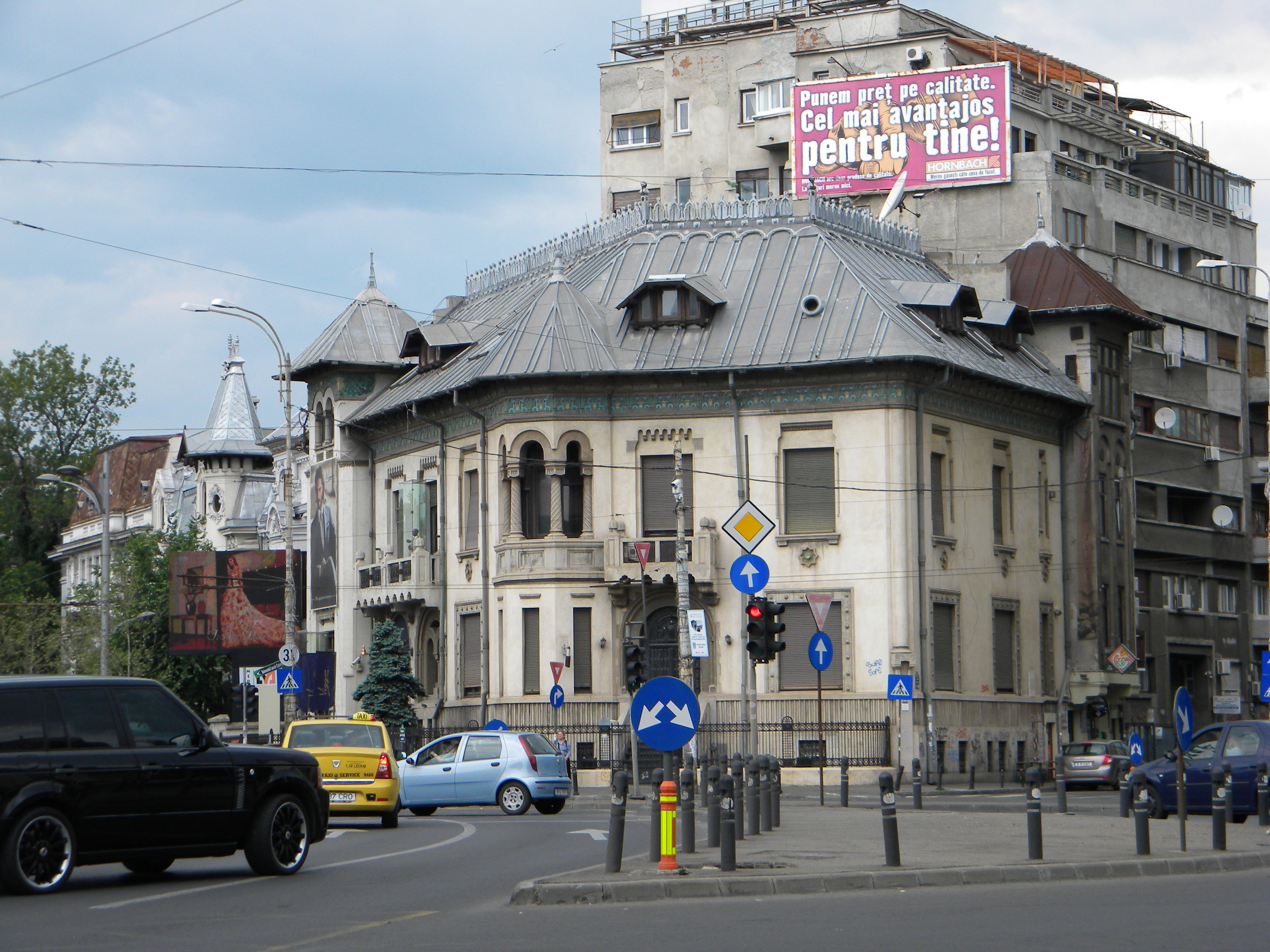
Gheorghe Petrașcu's house beside the ASE

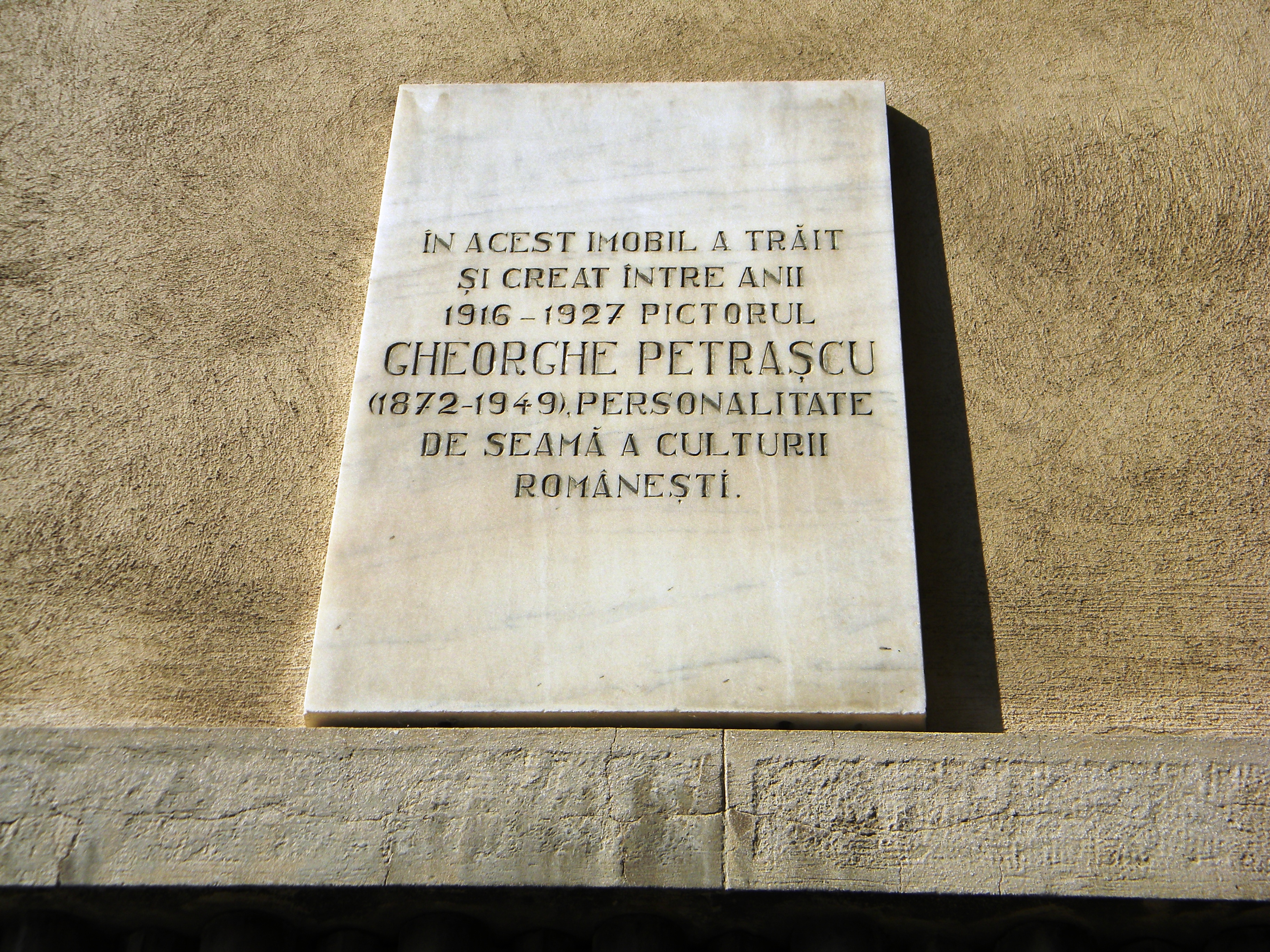
Memorial plaque from the Căderea Bastiliei Street no. 1

In 1920, Petrașcu moved to the former Căpitan Aviator Demetriade Gheorghe street no. 3, near Aviatorilor Boulevard. The house here was more spacious and the architectural style was a compromise between the rich ornamentation of the old architecture and the modernist style.

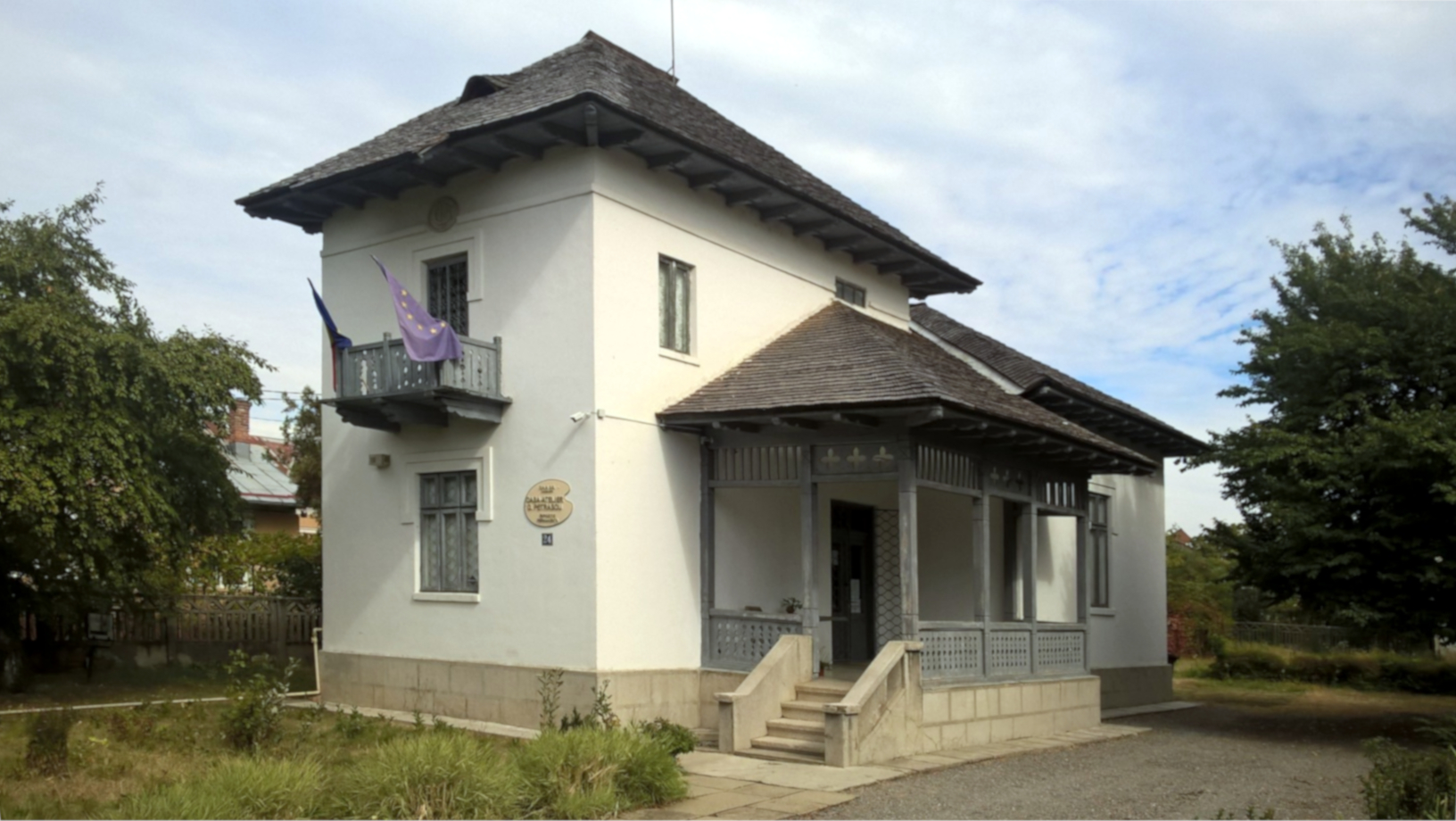
House - Studio "Gheorghe Petrașcu" from Târgoviște

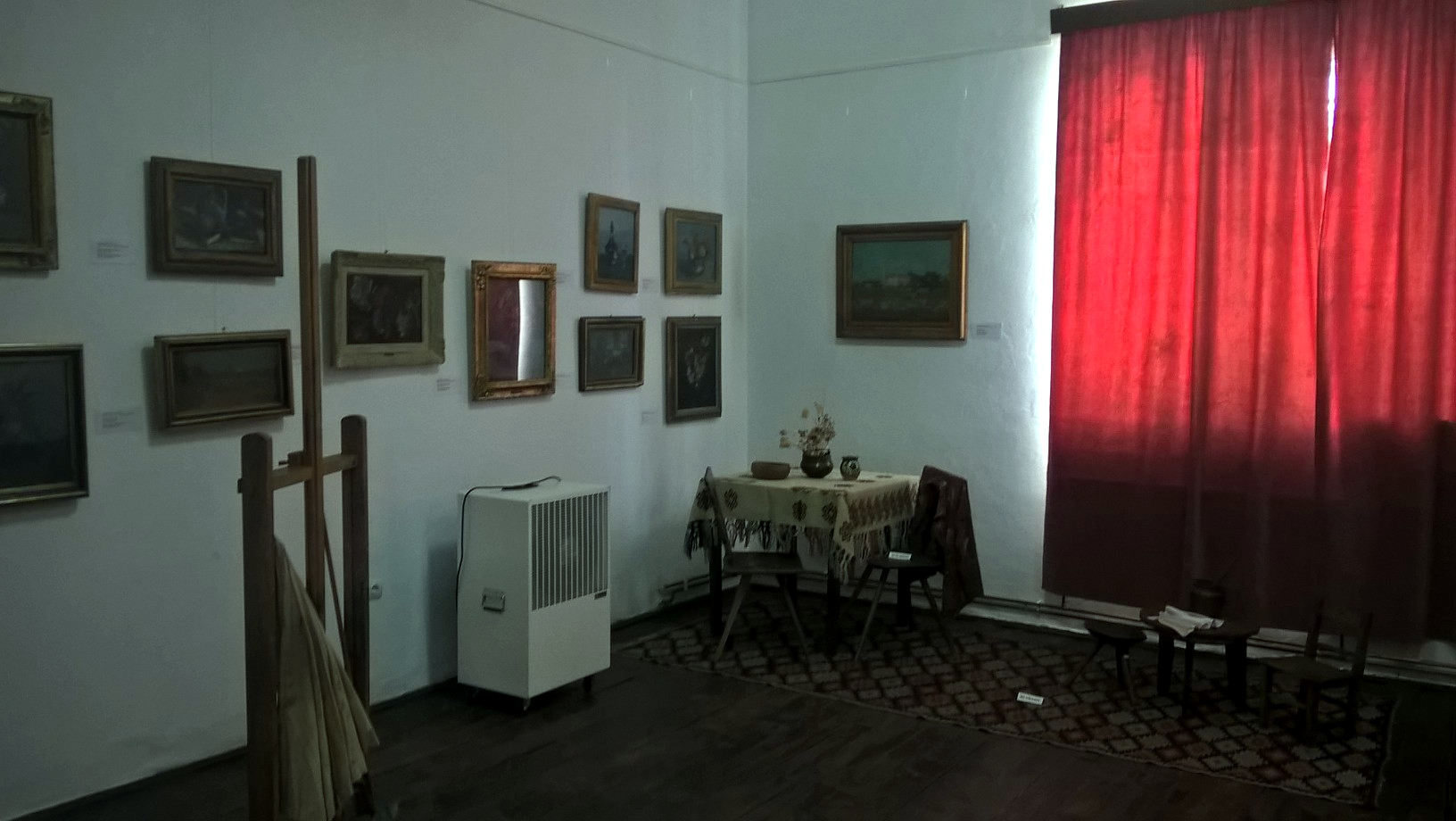
The studio from Târgoviște

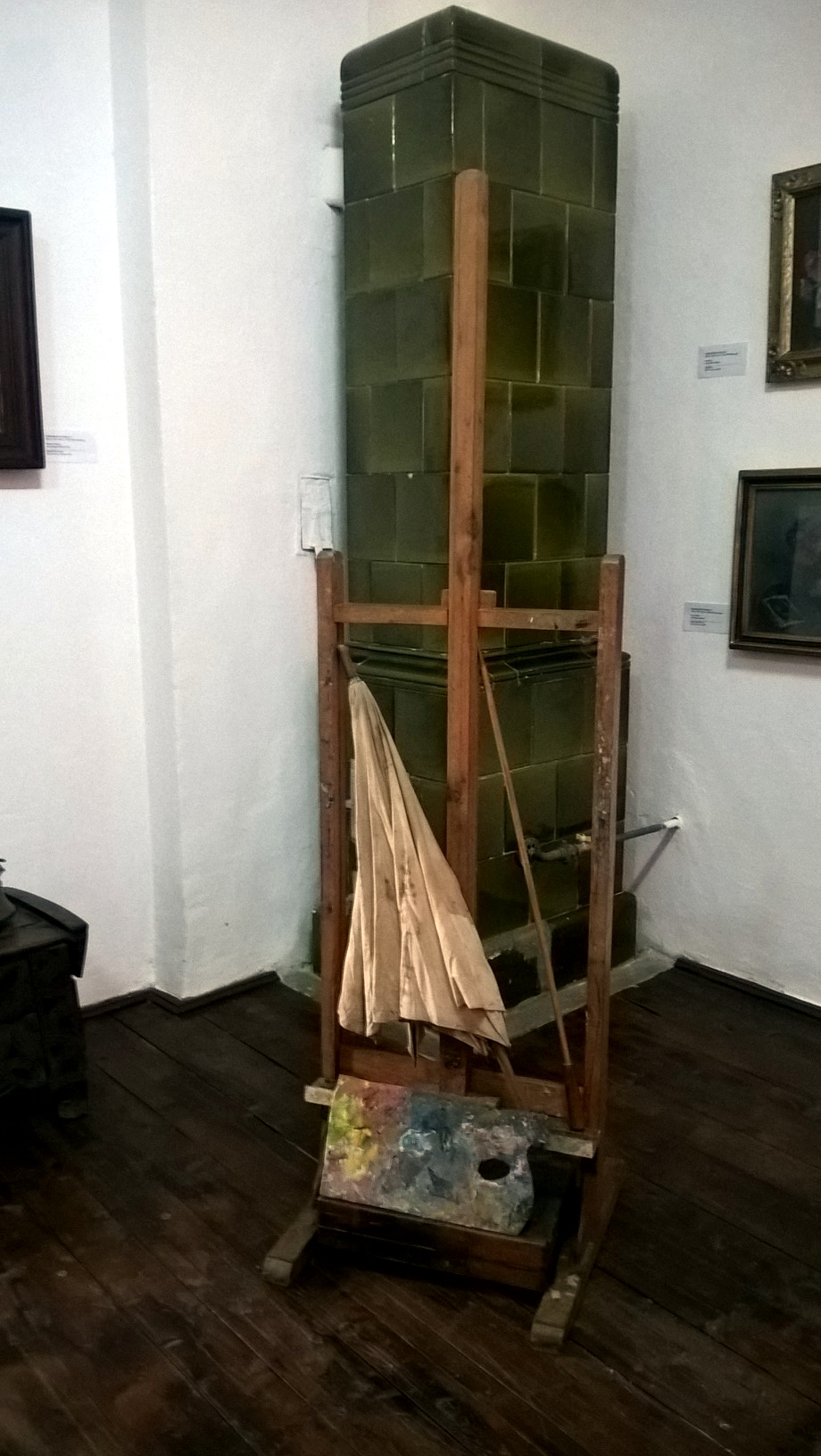
The easel in the studio

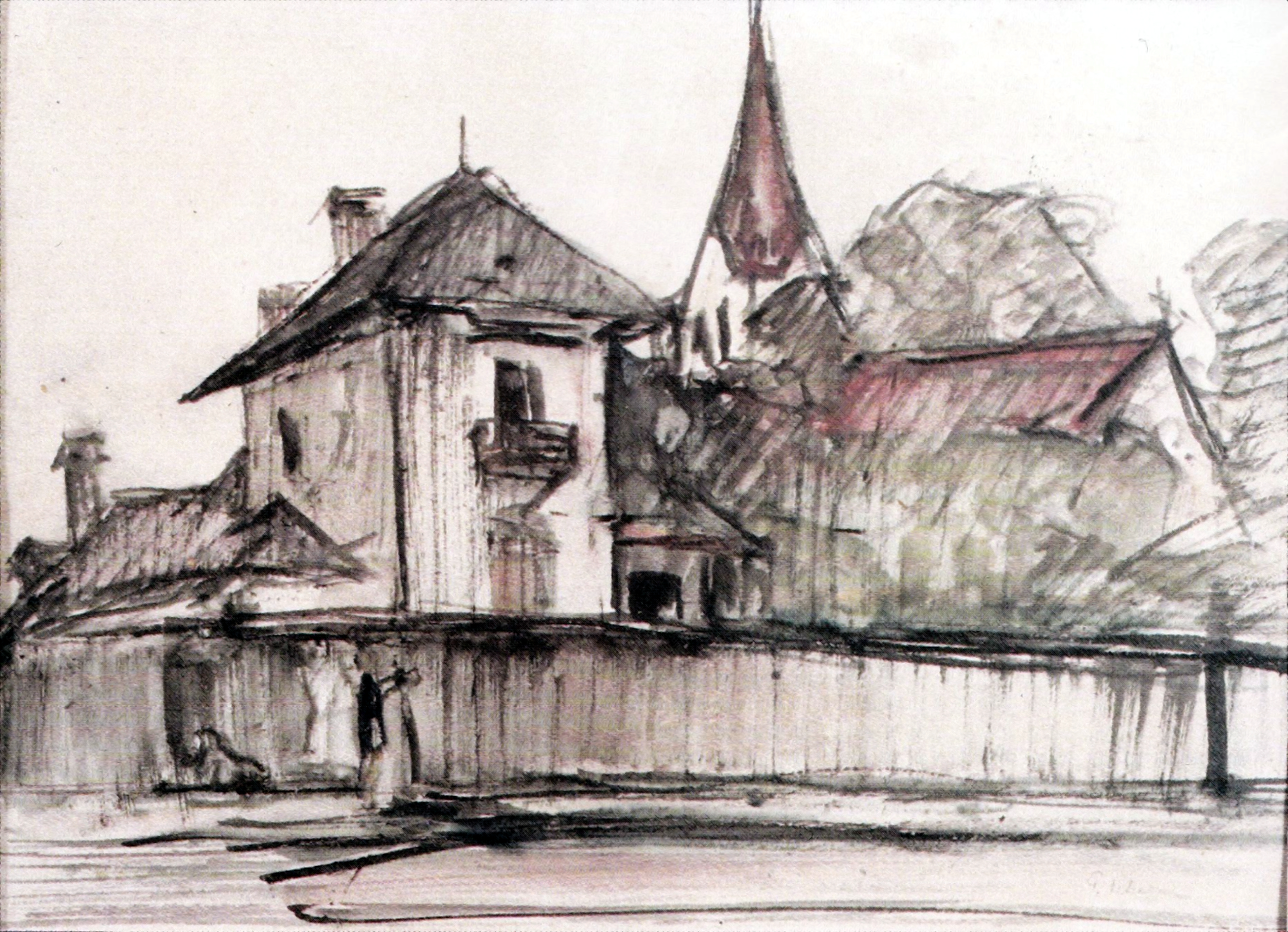
The house from Târgoviște - by Gh. Petrașcu

Also in 1920, Petrașcu visited the city of Târgoviște for the first time and as a result, between 1921 and 1922, he built a holiday residence where he came to paint. The house in Târgoviște had two rooms on the ground floor, the largest being reserved for the studio, and two rooms upstairs. From 1922 to 1940, the artist had a prodigious artistic creation activity in the studio of this house. The house in Târgoviște was inaugurated on 12 April 1970 as House-Studio of Gheorghe Petrașcu and entered the museum circuit of Romania. The museum thus created, exhibits photographs, memorial objects, paintbrushes, letters, easel, personal items, etc. In 1970, the museum had a collection of 51 works in oil and graphics approaching all the topics raised by the artist: portraits, landscapes, static natures and even an early painting from the cycle of Interiors.

=== Specification of the vocation ===
In 1872, when Gheorghe was born, Vasile (b. 1863) had not finished primary school and Nicolae (b. 1856) was at the colleague of Alexandru Vlahuță at Wriad High School. The latter two were good friends and sometimes spent their holidays in Tecuci. The historian Vasile Florea opined that Gheorghe Petrașcu would have learned to read and write until he entered primary school at the age of eight. Then followed the gymnasium from Tecuci. The drawing teacher Gheorghe Ulinescu noticed the artistic inclinations of his student.

Nicolae Petrașcu returned to Tecuci in 1887 from a trip to Constantinople where he worked as secretary of the legation. At that moment "...Looking out the window, I saw my brother lying on a bark under the acacia tree in the middle of the yard, singing a song. Then, passing into the room on the left, he saw a Christ's Head with a crown of thorns, made of pencil, next to a closet on the wall. This attempt seemed very beautiful to me, revealing in the black of the pencil of the future colorist. I called my brother from the yard and asked him if that head belonged to him. Answering me in the affirmative, you then advised him to learn painting for the first time. Iorgu, who was still a child, looked at me with eyes full of love and obedience, happy with what I recommended. He loved drawing so much that my words and praises watered his eyes."

== Education ==
=== Lyceum courses ===
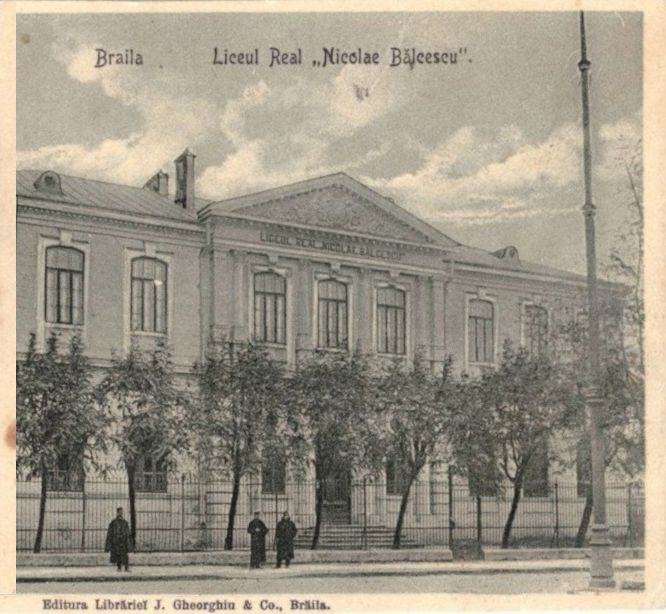
The real high school "Nicolae Bălcescu" from Brăila – postcard from 1909

After finishing the high school, Petrașcu had to choose between attending high school in Bârlad or the real high school in Brăila, in Iași or Bucharest. As the Real High School in Brăila was the first such high school in Romania that had been established a year before, in 1888, Petrașcu decided to dedicate himself to science without thinking. So, he entered high school in 1889 and graduated in 1892, in his second promotion. In Brăila, as in Tecuci, he was advised to follow the path of painting. He was not guided by the drawing teacher, a some Gheorghe Thomaide, nor by the painter Henryk Dembiński, who was a calligraphy teacher, but by Theodor Nicolau, a natural science teacher who was amazed by Petrașcu's drawings for zoology and botany.

He spent his holidays in Tecuci where he read foreign and Romanian literature and various magazines he had inherited from his father, such as Cezar Bolliac's Trumpet of the Carpathians and Valintineanu's Reformation. In his cousin's library, Dr. Constantin Petrașcu, he found La Grande Encyclopédie, Revue Bleue (Revue politique et littéraire), Revue des deux Mondes, La Revue scientifique and many Romanian magazines such as Convorbiri literare. Access to culture was, in fact, facilitated by his brother Nicolae. He had been attending Junimea evenings since 1888. He was an intimate of the artistic circles of the time, which included George Demetrescu Mirea, Ioan Georgescu and Ion Mincu. The three had just arrived from Paris and together with Duiliu Zamfirescu, Barbu Delavrancea and Alexandru Vlahuță founded the Intimal Club Literary Artistic Circle.

=== Bucharest School of Fine Arts ===
As provided by the school regulations, after finishing high school, Gheorghe Petrașcu passed the baccalaureate exam in Bucharest. After graduation, he did not take into account the advice he received regarding his academic career. As a result, he was enrolled in the Faculty of Natural Sciences. In 1893, when he was a second-year student, he was enrolled at the School of Fine Arts in Bucharest and for a time attended the courses of both higher education institutions. Eventually he gave up the natural sciences to devote himself to the fine arts.

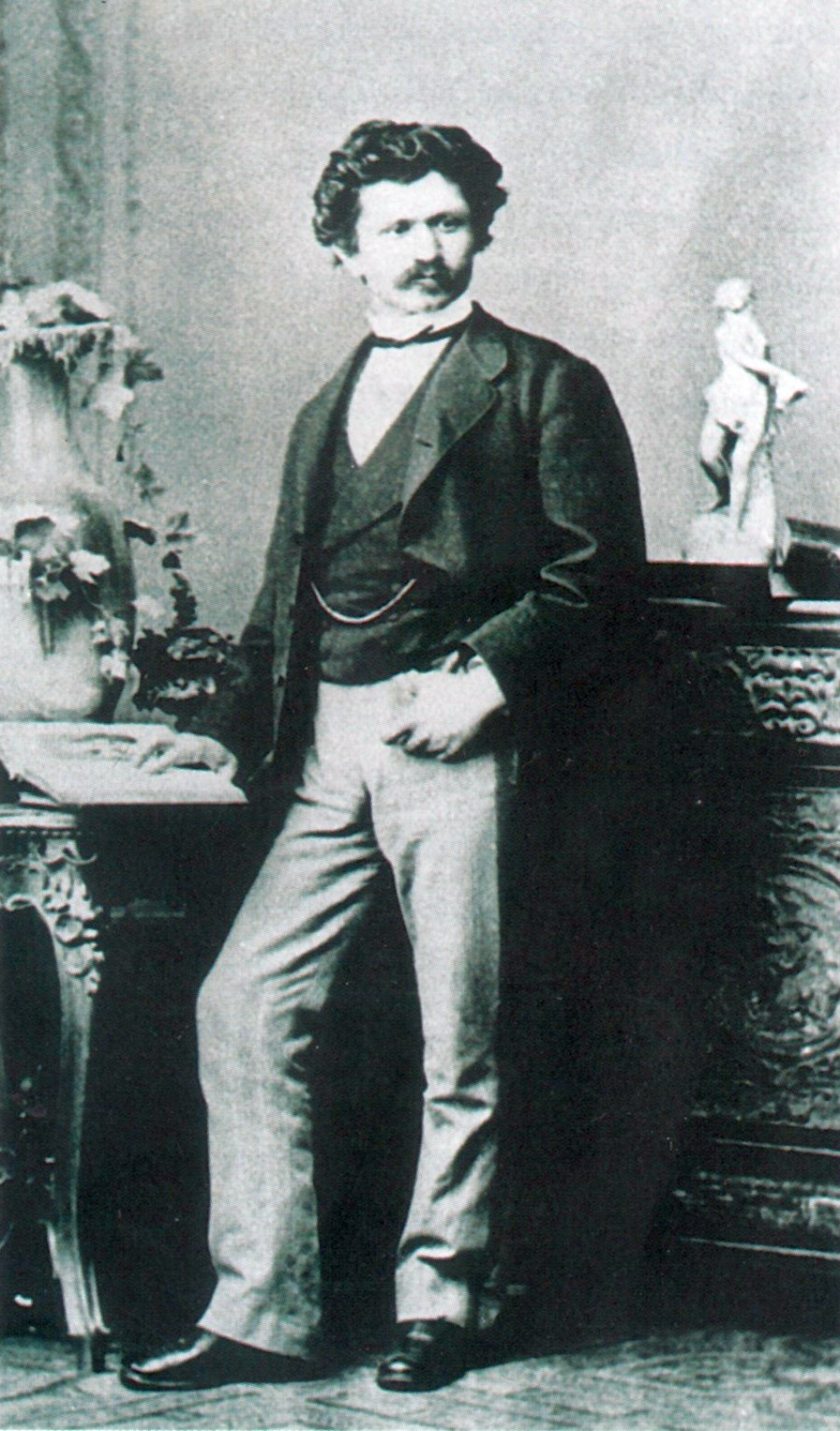
Constantin Stăncescu

As it is known, in 1893, when he entered Belle-Arte as a student, the school was going through a period of great convulsions. Theodor Aman had died in 1891, Gheorghe Tattarescu had retired in 1892 and Constantin Stăncescu had come to lead the institution, even though he had Nicolae Grigorescu as his opponent. At that time, the school principal directed the entire artistic life of Bucharest. He was the one who organized the Exhibitions of living artists and in 1894 he irritated all the artists, who complained to Minister Take Ionescu. However, he was the one listened to by the authorities, which is why in 1896 the Romanian secession in the visual arts took place after the model of similar events in Western Europe. The secessionists had in front of them Ștefan Luchian who had the endorsement of Nicolae Grigorescu. They launched a fulminating manifesto revealing the idea of emancipating artists under the tutelage of official art.

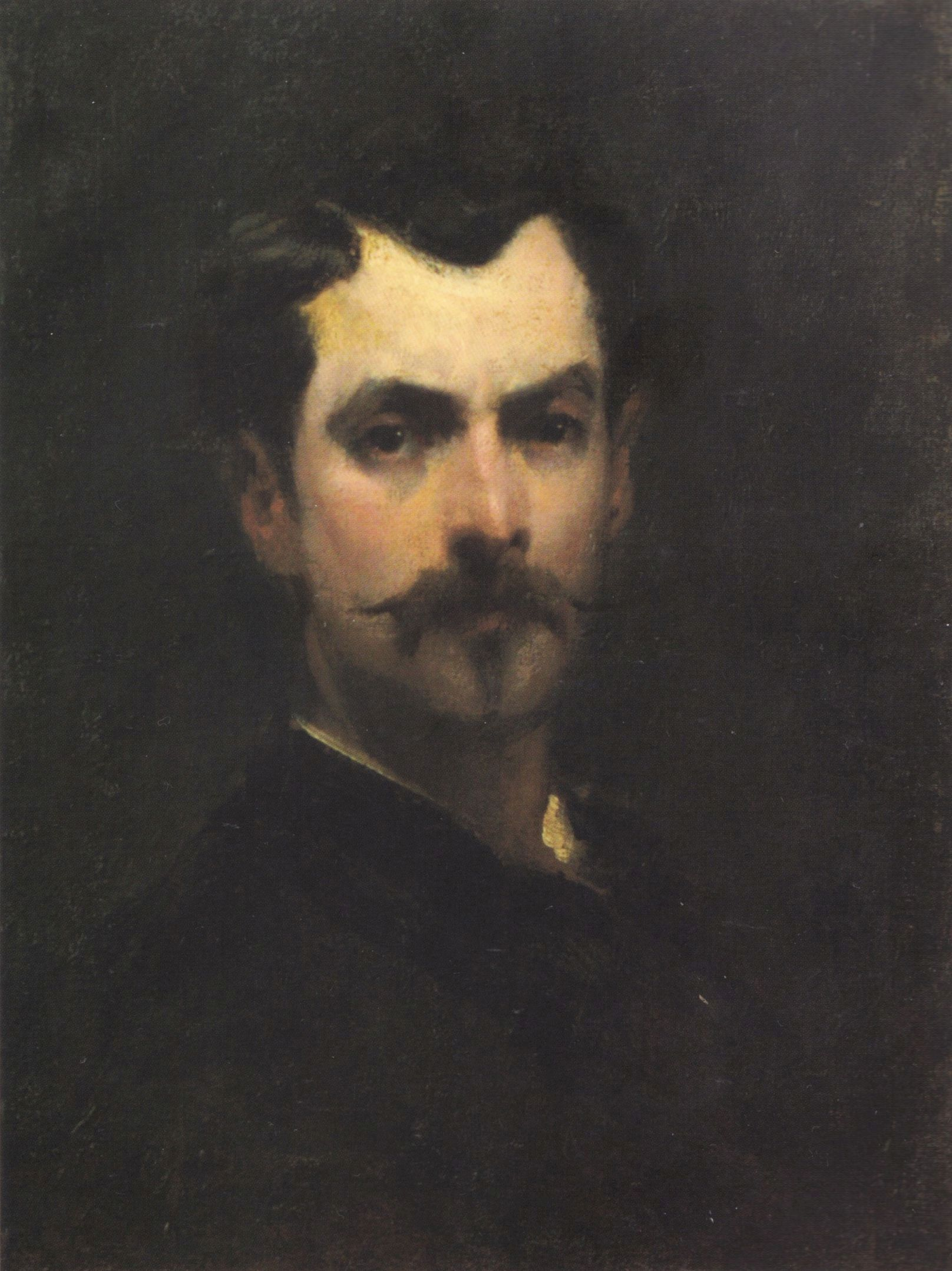
George Demetrescu Mirea

The students of the School of Fine Arts were also part of the rebels, as evidenced by the report that Stăncescu made to the ministry. Gheorghe Petrașcu was also mentioned together with A.C. Satmari, Pan Ioanid, Theodor Vidalis and many others. The director's retaliation did not take long to appear, and he decided to suppress "... the rewards — medals or mentions — which they obtained at the last competition held in December 1895". Petrașcu's 3rd class bronze medal was withdrawn from the Perspective competition. In this way, the students became radicalized, following the example of independent artists and a month before the Exhibition of Independent Artists in 1896, several students entered the hall where the works for the jury were gathered and destroyed them. Petrașcu was not part of this group.

The artist had as teacher George Demetrescu Mirea whom he appreciated and brought praiseworthy words "... admirable teacher, leaving all the freedom to his students, but always talking to them about the essential qualities of a good painting". Of the other teachers "... I listened because that was my nature: to listen to everyone and to do as I felt." The teaching results that Petrașcu obtained were not meritorious. As, in those times, the students were not given grades, but only medals and mentions following the works they did, Petrașcu did not obtain any gold or silver medal in all the five years of school. He was always satisfied with the bronze medal and the honorable mentions. Camil Ressu, who entered the School of Fine Arts in 1897, remembered that Petrașcu was considered Mirea's weakest student.. After mentioning Alexandru Henția, Pan Ioanid, Ion Theodorescu-Sion's colleagues and Jean Alexandru Steriadi, Ressu mentioned that Petrașcu worked with double glasses and that he had a vision damaged by some optical disorders. That is why he used a lot of black in his creations. This feature can be seen in most of the painter's achievements regardless of the period in which they were created. Gheorghe Petrașcu did not follow the teachings that the teachers prescribed for him at both the Bucharest and the Parisian schools.

==== Disciple of Nicolae Grigorescu ====
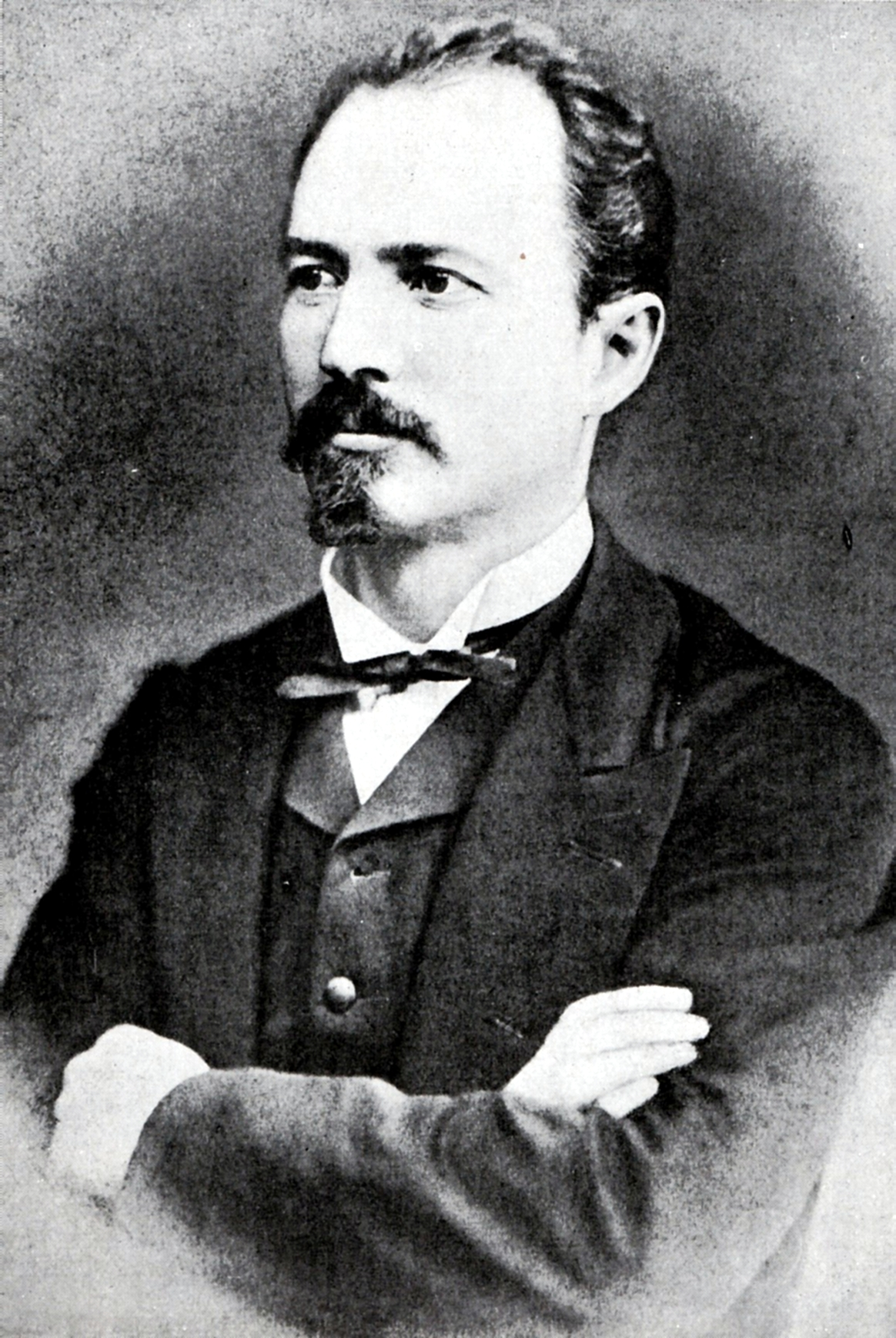
Nicolae Grigorescu

Gheorghe Petrașcu told while studying in Paris that he attended in parallel with the School of Fine Arts in Bucharest, a training program on his own with Nicolae Grigorescu. In an interview that Petrașcu gave to Rampa magazine, he stated that the Bucharest school had two teachers, Mirea and Grigorescu. Today it is known that Nicolae Grigorescu was never a professor at Belle-Arte. Vasile Florea considered that the artist made this statement because he truly considered himself a disciple of the master from Câmpina.

The reality is that Petrașcu visited Grigorescu very often, starting from 1894 to 1895, at his home, above the Altân pharmacy in Polonă Street, corner with Batiștei. At the first visit, the painter was accompanied by Ipolit Strâmbulescu and often, after that, they helped the master to varnish the paintings for the preparation of some exhibitions. Grigorescu showed the Romanian painter a lot of friendship, helped him receive a scholarship and was a good friend of Nicolae Petrașcu who wrote him a biography. Grigorescu and Gheorghe had a lasting friendship also due to the meetings in Câmpina, Agapia or Paris. Consequently, the artist published several biographical details about Grigorescu under the pseudonym Sanzio.

From the data that art criticism analyzed up to the level of 1989, it is not clear if Petrașcu would have seen how Nicolae Grigorescu was painting. Even Gheorghe Petrașcu contradicted himself in all his stories that remained to posterity. Thus, in 1929, he stated that "... we also looked respectfully at the canvases scattered through the rooms or watched the master in his work in front of the easel." In his 1931 interview, he stated the opposite. "...I've never seen him painting. I have been to him so many times, but whenever I get there he left pallet apart." In the interview taken by Ionel Jianu, Petrașcu stated that he showed Grigorescu the works he was doing and he made a critique full of sincerity.

The historian Vasile Florea expressed the opinion that it was not necessary for the disciple to witness the way Grigorescu painted to consider the latter as a mentor. The reality was that Gheorghe Petrașcu kept Grigorescu with a living admiration for the rest of his life. Admiration was also doubled by imitation, because the disciple was interested in the fresh creation of the mentor that contrasted blatantly with everything that was taught at that time at Belle-Arte in Bucharest. Petrașcu learned much more from Grigorescu than from any of the other Romanian artists.

It is known that Petrașcu had several copies after Grigorescu, such as the Woman's Head and the Shepherd with the Sheep dated 1897. It was verbally said that he together with Ipolit Strâmbulescu made copies, which they sold at good prices.

==== Nicolae Grigorescu and obtaining a scholarship in Paris ====
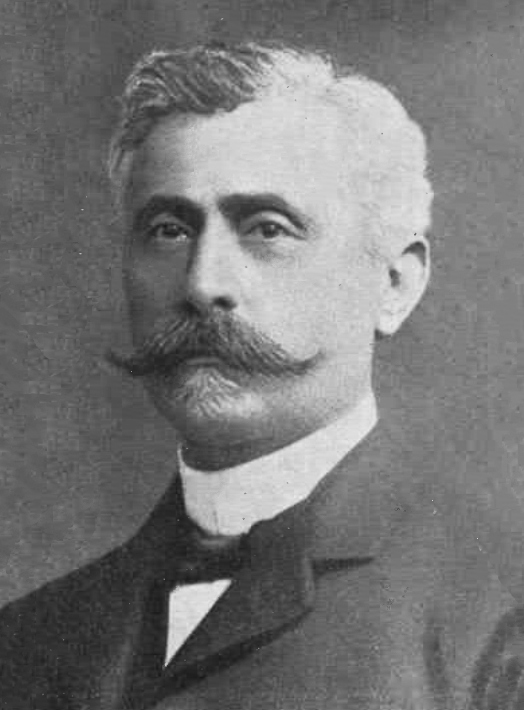
Spiru Haret

In 1898, Gheorghe Petrașcu graduated from the School of Fine Arts in Bucharest. As the school results did not allow him to obtain a scholarship abroad, granted through the school, Nicolae Petrașcu asked Nicolae Grigorescu to contribute to such an endeavor. As a result, Grigorescu spoke with Spiru Haret, who was the Minister of Public Instruction that year, who responded positively to the request. The scholarship that the ministry granted to Petrașcu, of 1200 lei (1898), was part of the Iosif Niculescu fund. Consequently, on 19 November 1898, Gheorghe Petrașcu sent Grigorescu a letter of thanks from Paris, 29 Rue Gay Lussac.

Grigorescu's interventions with Spiru Haret were repeated in 1901, as evidenced by another letter of thanks that Petrașcu sent him. During this period, the artist met at least twice, probably in the summer of 1900, with Grigorescu at Agapia where the master was with Barbu Delavrancea and Alexandru Vlahuță. From Petrașcu's confessions, he presented to the master some works he had done, Grigorescu appreciating the one entitled After the rain at Agapia. As a result, Delavrancea, relying on Grigorescu's expertise, bought him the painting for the Bucharest City Hall from the first personal exhibition that Petrașcu organized.

The second meeting between Petrașcu and Grigorescu took place in Paris on the occasion of the International Exhibition. Grigorescu visited him at the workshop and studied his works, after which they walked through exhibitions, through the Grand Palais. A third meeting took place in 1903 when the painter visited Grigorescu in Câmpina. The memories of Grigorescu followed him all his life and he evoked them repeatedly. The highest homage he paid to Nicolae Grigorescu was on the occasion of his reception in the Romanian Academy in 1937.

=== Moment 1900 in Paris ===
In 1900 in the French capital presupposes an in-depth analysis of the last decade of the nineteenth century and the first decade of the twentieth century. The triumph of the innovations presented at the Universal Exhibition in Paris in 1889 had as its first landmark the construction of the Eiffel Tower, when iron was first introduced in architecture. The second indisputable landmark was the outbreak of World War I. Artistically, another landmark was the great exhibition of Paul Cézanne's work opened by art dealer Ambroise Vollard in 1895. Through temporal symmetry, in 1907, after Cézanne's death in 1906 and starting from his work, Cubism was inaugurated, a current that had extensive artistic consequences in the history of the arts (Misses of Avignon by Pablo Picasso).

Similar to the secessionist events in Paris, the 1896 Exhibition of Independent Artists in Bucharest was a start-up event for a new stage in the Romanian arts. On this occasion, the idyllic dreams of Grigorescu's descendants began to fade. The volume of memoirs entitled The Two-Century Riding of the memorialist Sextil Pușcariu is telling, an analysis that was also limited to a symmetrical period, 1895–1905.

Gheorghe Petrașcu arrived in Paris after a short stop in Munich. He is the one who stopped the least in the Bavarian capital of all Romanian artists. There is no information or trace left to posterity that the painter left in Munich. The power of attraction of Paris has been steadily rising over the years, so that the notoriety which Munich had enjoyed had declined. Munich's vogue had historically been due to the extinction of Forty-Eighters echoes and the growing assertion of the Junimea ideology. Exponents of ideological prosperity were Ioan Slavici, Mihai Eminescu, Ion Luca Caragiale, Alexandru Dimitrie Xenopol and many others. The first to change his orientation was Alexandru Macedonski who lived and wrote in Paris and then Dimitrie Anghel from 1893 lived enthusiastically "the new religion of symbolism". Petrașcu was preceded in Paris by Theodor Cornel, Alexandru Bogdan-Pitești, but also by Ștefan Luchian five years earlier, and even Theodor Aman, Ion Andreescu and George Demetrescu Mirea in ancient times. Others found Petrascu in Paris. Such were Ștefan Popescu, Ipolit Strâmbulescu, Kimon Loghi, Constantin Artachino, Eustațiu Stoenescu, Ludovic Bassarab, the engraver Gabriel Popescu and Dimitrie Serafim. With Serafim, Stoenescu and Artachino, Petrașcu was a colleague at the Académie Julian.

==== Student at the Académie Julian ====
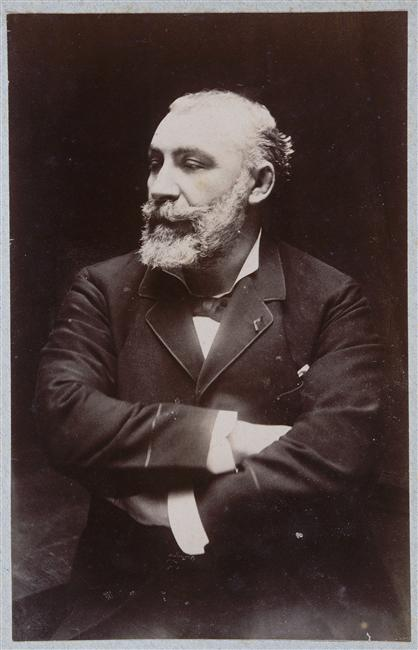
Rodolphe Julian (1839–1907), the founder of the Académie Julian

Gheorghe Petrașcu attended the Académie Julian, but without much determination. As is well known, he worked at Stefan Luchian in William-Adolphe Bouguereau's studio. He also had teachers Benjamin-Constant, Jean-Paul Laurens and Gabriel Ferrier. The artist did not have much to learn from these representatives of official Parisian art, especially from Bouguereau who was a champion of academism. In all the evocations that Petrașcu made, he passed very quickly over the years of plastic training. He stated that he went more to drawing classes and through the exhibitions and museums on Rue Laffite where he could see the works exhibited by the Impressionists. Of his obligations to the Académie Julian, only Orpheus in Hell and The Fall of Troy are known. During Nicolae Grigorescu's visit to Paris in 1900, he saw the two compositions and was disappointed. Instead, he saw some works by nature made by Petrașcu in the Fontainbleau forest and encouraged him to go in that direction of art.

==== Parisian Bohemia ====
If his relationship with the Académie Julian suffered from a reserved attitude, on the other hand Gheorghe Petrașcu lived in Paris in an atmosphere full of effervescence in the community of Romanians who were there. He has established connections with most of the writers and artists mentioned above. From their accounts in which his name also appears, there is a moderate manifestation. A participant in the bohemian movement through the cafes in Montmartre, Petrașcu did not have any theoretical subtleties like Ștefan Popescu and he was not a passionate interlocutor like Dimitrie Anghel, but he always had a categorical reply. In Paris, Romanians passed by the Cluny cafes, La café Vachette, the Chatelet brasserie, La Bullier, similar to the Moulin Rouge in the Latin Quarter or the Closerie de Lilas. Petrașcu's presence at such meetings was picturesquely evoked by Sextil Pușcariu together with Ștefan Octavian Iosif, Dimitrie Anghel, Ștefan Popescu, Ipolit Strâmbulescu and Kimon Loghi: "...With his tie tied in an artistic bow, you swore that Petrașcu was coming down from Montmartre, if his word, which was answered by the Moldavian, had not betrayed another homeland".

The meetings at Closerie de Lilas were not idyllic, even if Pușcariu found a special charm. He acknowledged that due to the fact that the group of Romanians had become too large, with all kinds of people who were not to the liking of others, it was often not possible to achieve a cohesion and an atmosphere characterized by intimacy. Restricting himself to a group of six people: Dimitrie Anghel, Șt. O. Iosif, Virgil Cioflec, Sextil Pușcariu, Kimon Loghi and Gheorghe Petrașcu, the new group moved its headquarters from Closerie de Lilas to a cafe in front of Montparnasse station. From here, the group then took refuge in Kimon Loghi's studio, where Turcu (nicknamed Loghi) made tea or coffee.

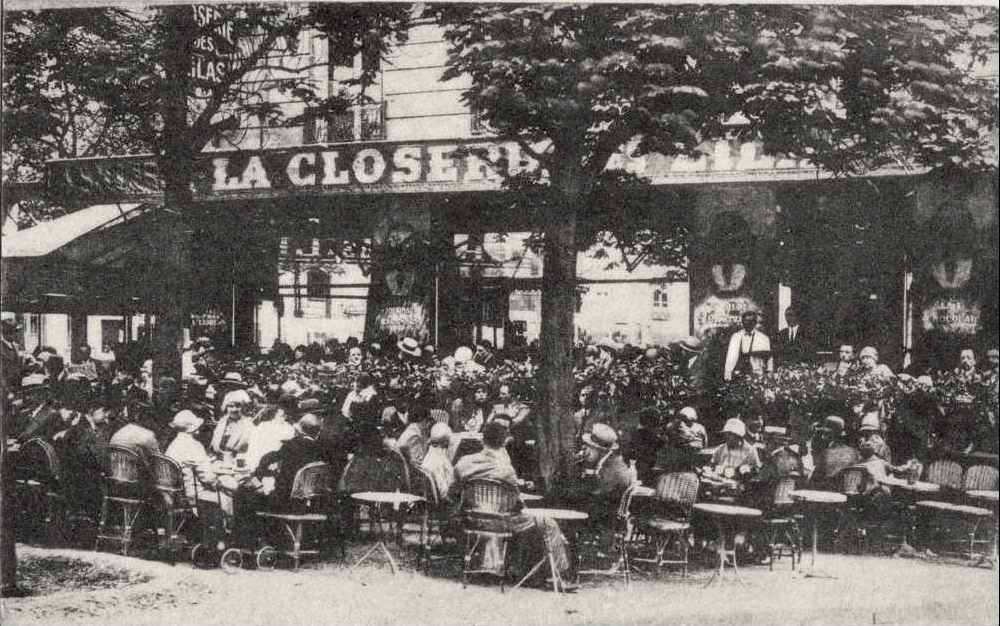
La Closerie des Lilas in 1909

At the Turk's studio, social or political events were debated, especially since Ștefan Popescu, who corresponded with Constantin Dobrogeanu-Gherea and Dimitrie Anghel had socialist affinities. Also at Turcu, the discussions around arts and literature became exciting. Here he came into contact with symbolist ideas, considered by some to be decadent. Paul Verlaine and Albert Samain as well as the painters of the Les Nabis group were on everyone's lips. Petrașcu listened and at the end "he saved a controversy with a loud and pressing word, like the thick lines and pasty colors he used in his canvases." Here, the poems of Ștefan Octavian Iosif and Dimitrie Anghel were recited before they were sent by Petrașcu to Romania for publication in the magazine Literatură şi artă română, whose leader was Nicolae Petrașcu. These meetings were evoked by Iosif and Anghel later under the pseudonym A. Mirea: "… We lived in Paris, at that time, a group of young people whom the story had gathered and each brought his own special note once a week, in one cafe or another, and we sat on jokes and stories until late. I recall the past and see around the marble table the nice faces… Petrașcu with his healthy Moldovan humor, rich in anecdotes and cheerful approaches…"

==== The last two years in Paris ====
In the last two years in which he stayed intermittently in Paris, to finish his studies, the group of Romanians from Closerie de Lilas broke up, because most of them returned to Romania. Of course, these were not all those with whom Petrașcu communicated in the French capital. Among the other characters is the art critic Theodor Cornel, named Toma Dumitriu. He spent his childhood in Iasi and was of the same generation as the artist. Also, an important difference is that he did not belong to the category of those from whom Petrașcu came and he always struggled in insurmountable material deficiencies, he constantly living in a lucid poverty. Because of this, he probably chose the pseudonym Tristis, with which he signed the chronicles he wrote for the newspaper Evenimentul. Cornel had been in Paris since 1896 and was a regular at cafes where, as he stated, one could write "…the history of Romanianism in Paris". It seems that Petrașcu was in a cordial relationship with Cornel because he was supposed to be one of those who collaborated in publishing bilingual magazines Revue franco-roumaine. As it is known, the magazine was founded by Stan Golestan together with Theodor Cornel in 1901, as an exaltation of Le cercle d'accier, an artistic circle founded at the initiative of Cornel in 1899. The circle brought together French painters Gilbert Dupuis, Bernard Naudin, Bouquet and engraver Victor Vibert.

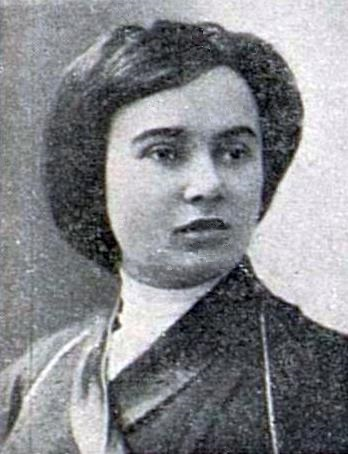
Cecilia Cuțescu-Storck

The historian Vasile Florea stated that looking through the prism of the experience he gained, helping Nicolae Petrașcu in editing The Romanian Literature and Art magazine. Gheorghe would have been interested in Theodor Cornel's publication, because he appears in the editorial team. On the other hand, in the only few issues of the magazine, Petrașcu has no published article. What is certain is that he remained on good terms with Theodor Cornel. A bizarre thing is that Theodor Cornel, although it is known that he attended the workshops of several Romanian artists in Paris, such as Constantin Brâncuși, Frederic Storck, Nicolae Gropeanu, Cecilia Cuțescu-Storck, it seems that he never visited Petrașcu because only in 1908, writing a chronicle about an exhibition of artistic youth, stated that "...today I see for the first time the painting of this artist and what a celebration in my soul!..."

From Petrașcu's relationship with Cecilia Cuțescu-Storck, which also had epistolary connotations under the sign of Cupid, shows that he did not accept visits in the privacy of his workshop. Cecilia Cuțescu stated that "...Gheorghe Petrașcu and Ștefan Popescu visited me from time to time, and I also sometimes went to see their works. What special natures these friends had; Popescu gladly showed me his paintings, while Petrașcu, although we valued each other, was darker, he didn't want to see what he was working on. As far as I know, this feature remained in the end; he never liked to show you the paintings before exhibiting them." It is also known that Petrașcu never exhibited at the Official Salon in Paris. He sent two paintings but was not accepted. Cecilia Cuțescu mentioned one of the refusals and also admitted. He exhibited, instead, at exhibitions in Bucharest with paintings made in Paris in 1900, 1903 and later. In 1902, the artist returned to Bucharest forever.

== Tendencies and trends ==
=== Tendencies – The moment in 1900 in Romania ===
Gheorghe Petrașcu's artistic training and the beginnings of his prominence as a painter coincided with a great turning point in Romanian art and culture. It was characterized by an acute need for change after many decades of struggle between the last bastions of Pasoptism and political junimism. The young, but robust, socialist movement positioned itself in the immediate vicinity of the latter. By simplifying the phenomenon, it can be said that the struggle was between the national current and modernism. The moment 1900, understood in Romania by extension, from the mid-90s of the nineteenth century until the beginning of the First World War, was called the so-called national moment. Those who studied and analyzed this period, substantiated its historical motivation starting from theoretical bases. Thus, the failure to fully realize the demands of the bourgeois-democratic revolution of 1848, corroborated by the unsatisfactory nature of the reforms of the 1960s, led to the degradation of the peasantry situation, which represented over 90% of the country's population. This was a first goal to be achieved and called for an immediate and radical solution. With the formation of the modern Romanian state, the second desideratum appeared, which presupposed the integration of the new state with the Romanian territories outside the existing borders. Thus, all the instruments for bringing Transylvania to the borders of Romania were activated on a literary-artistic, cultural and political level.

The two desideratum's manifested themselves in the field of art, culture and literature, in the form of a strong national current of a social-romantic nature, a fact confirmed by researchers in the field. The exponent of this current was Sămănătorism that defined itself as a romanticism degraded by anachronism and exaggeration. Ovid Densusianu characterized it as a minor romanticism and George Călinescu as a small provincial and rustic romanticism. Both Sămănătorism and Junimism, as well as Poporanism, which is no stranger to socialist ideas, were currents that followed the interests of small producers and landowners. They criticized capitalism, blaming it, and wanted Romania to bypass it by expressing its option for an eminently agrarian development. For these reasons, there has been an unparalleled orientation towards ethnicism and especially towards the repulsion displayed for the city, urbanization, as places of loss, collapse and alienation.

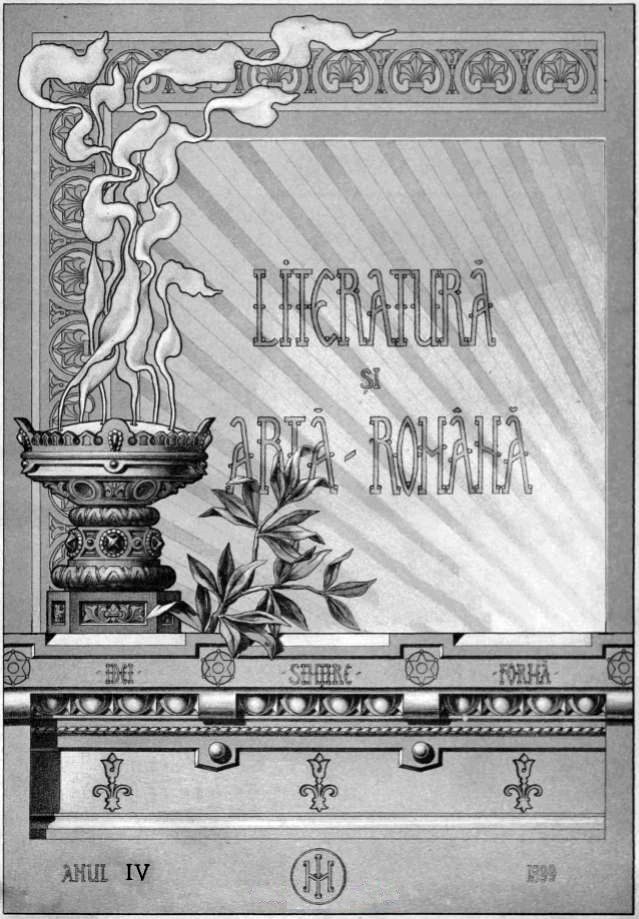
The magazine Literatură și artă română – 1899

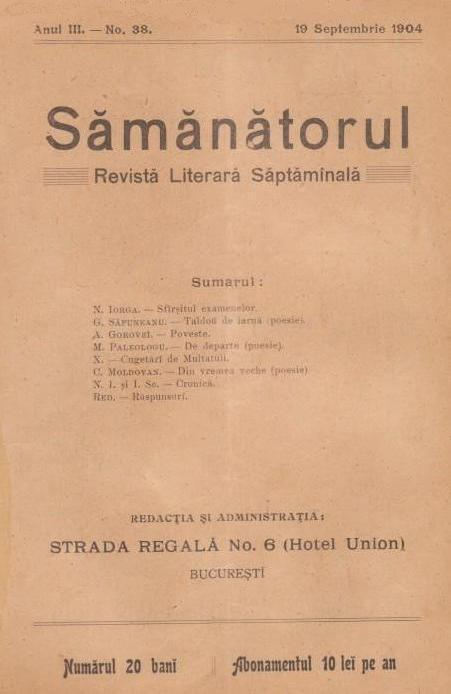
The magazine Sămănătorul – 19 September 1904

Although the most stubborn sowers had the best intentions, "...the tradition turned into traditionalism, the evocation of the historical past, into passeism, compassion for the fate of the peasantry into a peasant mysticism that — paradoxically — eludes the social aspect of the action, the evocation of the state in it idealization, the national specificity in nationalism and chauvinism, the containment of the excess of translations, in severe cultural protectionism." By contrast with the agrarian currents, the symbolist movement has shyly appeared at first and then very vigorously and later was called as Art 1900. The symbolists campaigned for the synchronization of local art with Western art, for emancipation from the conservative formulas of tradition. Appearing as a reaction to the dissatisfaction generated by the defeat of the Paris Commune, as a decadent depressive state, the symbolist movement arrived in Romania as an explosive state that lacked the spark for detonation. Romania was prepared to receive symbolism, with Western models playing the role of promoter.

An important role for Sămănătorism aesthetics was played by the magazine Literatură şi artă română led by Nicolae Petrașcu, which through ideas, feeling and form made the transition from Junimea to Sămănătorul. Thus, Ilie Torouțiu pointed out that he had a pre-similar rumor in the program in which Maiorescian cosmopolitanism was a reason for launching some and withdrawing others. The magazine's tendency was categorical in support of local art and literature, but it allowed, using ambiguous terms, the opening of a path to some modernizations of expression and renewal. On the other hand, taking into account its main tendency, which was a national one, Nicolae Iorga praised her, as there were reservations for the concessions he made to the modernist spirit. By comparison with the magazine Sămănătorul, Romanian Literature and Art proved an appetite for the new artistic currents. Because the magazine was fashionable and reflected the progress of things, it received the golden medal at the Universal Exhibition in Paris in 1900. An argument for this critical analysis is the cover of the magazine, which has a neoclassical handcuff from which rise stylized flames in Secession – Art Nouveau style, compared to that of Sămănătorul who was as characterized by Nicolae Iorga "… modest magazine in white minority dress, without an appeal, without ornaments."

Gheorghe Petrașcu lived in Nicolae Petrașcu's house and knew too well the guidelines of the magazine run by him. Between 1906 and 1907, he himself published chronicles about art under the pseudonym Sanzio. He saw the need for change in art, just as in literature the less obedient spirits of traditionalism sought new methods and ways to get out from under the shadow of Mihai Eminescu. He noticed that in art it manifested itself in a sowing spirit, a reaction to the sweetened and tasteless idyllicness of Nicolae Grigorescu's descendants, as well as an attitude to mortified academism in rigid forms. Petrașcu also knew the Parisian symbolist experiences and is known to have been friends with Dimitrie Anghel. The extent to which symbolism contaminated Petrașcu was revealed by Theodor Enescu, who defined the impact that this current had on local art.

As is well known, symbolism could never be precisely defined in art, as it has been in literature. The concept came closest to the variations of the 1900 Art style, ie Art Nouveau, Modern Style, Mir iskusstva, Secession, etc. The perfect overlap was only with the Nabi group. Expanding its scope a lot at European level, many artists who are followers of the current can be listed. The same can be done in Romania: Ștefan Luchian, Aurel Popp, Apcar Baltazar and even Constantin Brâncuși and Dimitrie Paciurea.

Of course, symbolism has two directions depending on what is actually meant by it. The first direction is that of the so-called cultured proletarian artists who were decimated by misery and phthisis and as a result, were prey to despair and skepticism, in which symbolism was the evil of the turn of the century. In this case, the artist appealed to the occultism, esotericism and all kinds of bizarreness. The second direction was that of artists who had no material deficiencies. Their symbolism was one without anxieties, turmoil or drama, and they lived their lives without worries. Unlike Traian Demetrescu, Ștefan Petică or Iuliu Cezar Săvescu, they were willing "to look at life from a contemplative angle ...; they show aesthetic inclinations, often gratuitous delight, not infrequently hedonistic. That is why they will be receptive especially to the atmosphere of fête galante ... tasting of symbolism especially the sets and attitudes of refinement, the thin emotion ...".

By relating Petrașcu to symbolism, it is easy to see that he is part of the second direction, because he cannot be assimilated to Petică who said that "the cafes and the mess ate me fried". He was a robust character and by no means had neuroses, spleen or languor. Petrașcu did not revolt, he came from his own vineyards and as a result he had nothing to repudiate. Feeling the routine of the old ways of expression, he understood that the time had come for art to flourish. Having a deep respect for the values of Romanian and universal art, he perceived them as landmarks and fixed them as beacons of orientation.

=== Influences, suggestions and options ===
Gheorghe Petrașcu's artistic education also presupposed the existence of some of the most diverse artistic phenomena and factors that depended on it. It is obvious that there were influences of some foreign and Romanian painters that manifested themselves from the earliest artistic manifestations of the Romanian painter. The historian Theodor Enescu meticulously revealed Petrașcu's formative years and revealed art critics, all the twists and turns of the path followed by the artist, as well as all the alluvium that his work led to its becoming unique. In this sense, the statements that Petrașcu made regarding the examples, so the foreign influences, which affected him during the plastic education, were particularly clear and direct. The interview from 1937 is telling when he acknowledged that "for a painter, the first way to expand his possibilities of expression is to visit museums where a large part of the spiritual treasure of humanity has been accumulated. From this point of view I must recognize as masters the Venetian Titian, the Florentines Boticeli and Veronese, the Flemish succulents, the Spanish colorists and of course the Impressionists Renoir, Sisley and Pissaro."

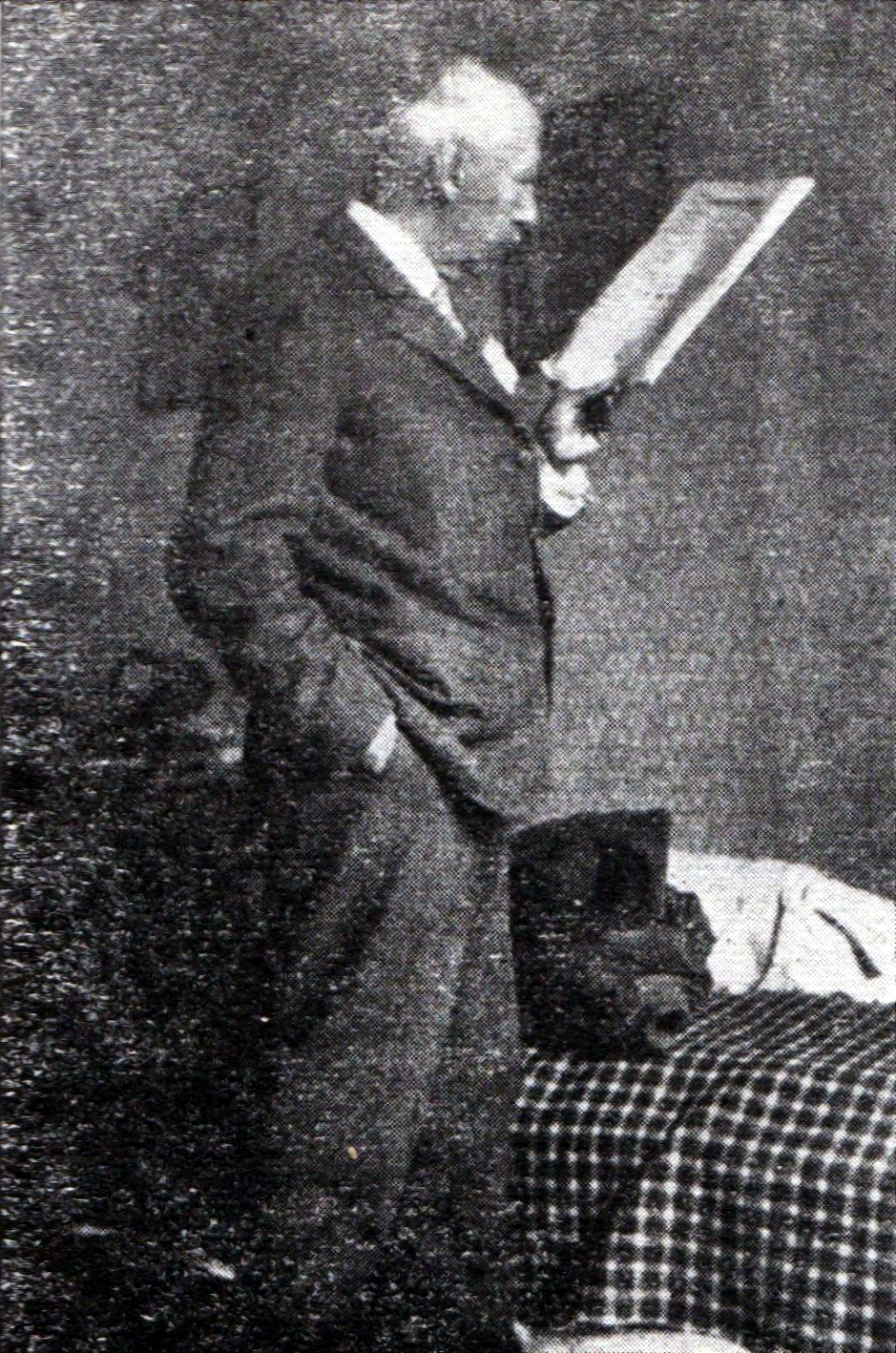
Gheorghe Petrașcu in his house in Bucharest

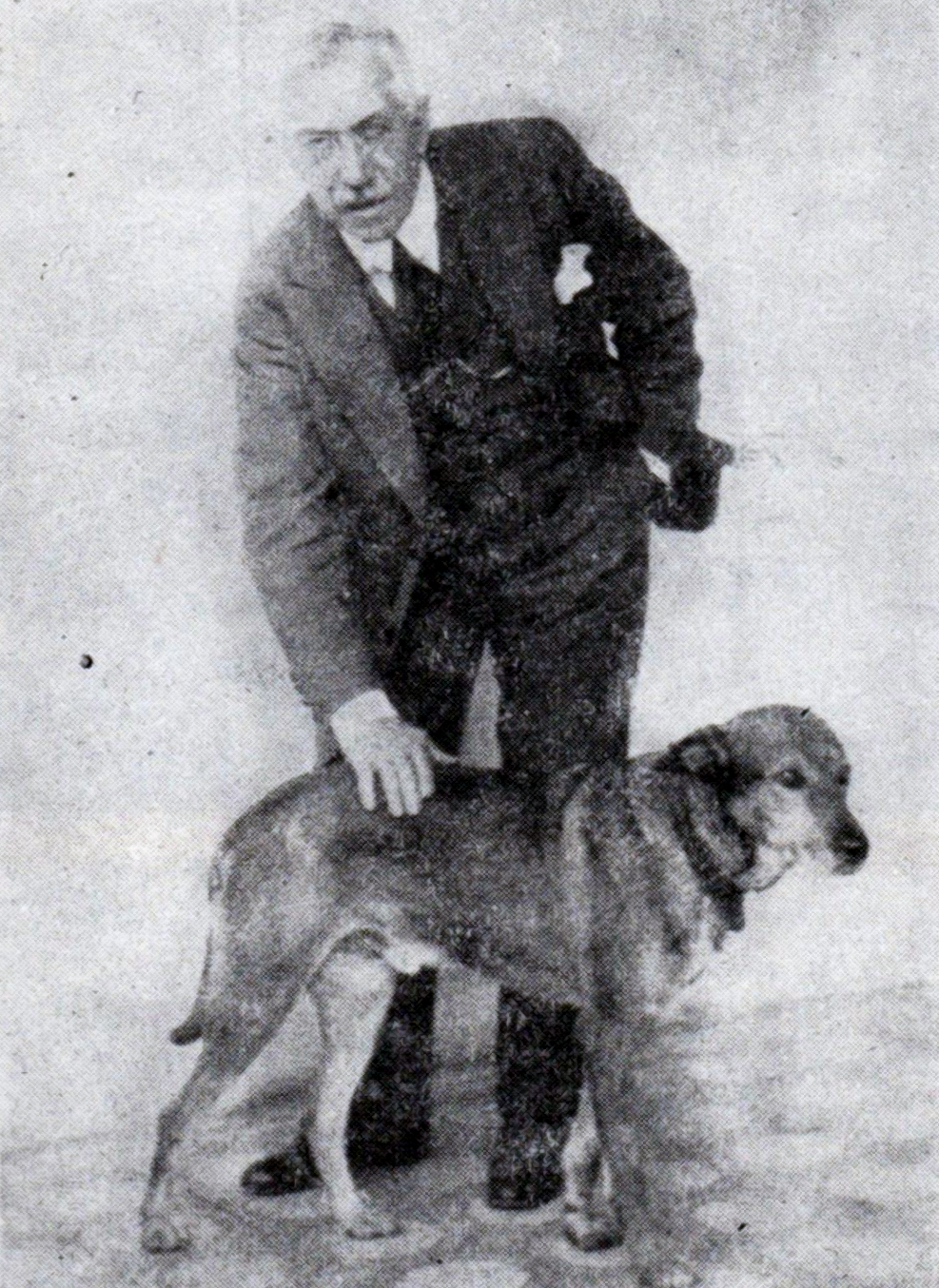
Gheorghe Petrașcu in 1925

In the opinion of the historian Vasile Florea, the fact that Petrașcu recognized some artists as masters does not mean that he perceived this attitude as an obedient one and the lesson they gave him as a direct, unassimilated influence. He stated that "...I saw many beautiful things, but I always avoided influences." Taking the resonances of Podgorica as an example, he said "...I prefer my glass as small as it is mine." As a result of such statements and of the work left to posterity, it is found that Petrașcu had an active attitude regarding the universal artistic heritage, selecting both from the great tradition of painting and from the modern phenomena of his contemporaneity. He chose everything that molded his temperament and his conception of art.

Petrașcu's way of paying homage to the great predecessors of universal painting consisted in making children according to their works. This fact is also a working method used in art education around the world. Copying works was for Gheorghe Petrașcu an activity that he practiced all his life and which he recommended to others, saying that "…Copying good paintings teaches the artist the craft... a piece of advice of great importance for young painters it is to make children after the great works of the past. I consider this exercise as a means of experimental knowledge of masterpieces."

Petrașcu did not understand by copying the obtaining of an identical work, made mechanically, but the recreation of the work making a free interpretation for fixing the light, shadow and color relationships, all aiming at the expressiveness of gestures and revealing the essence in volumes. As it is known, the artist made many copies after Nicolae Grigorescu and, certainly, many after works exhibited at the Louvre. His habit of making sketches, sometimes fleeing from paintings in museums, as well as the habit of making documentary trips, is known as the journey of 1902 with Ferdinand Earle in Germany, Netherlands, Belgium and England or in 1904 in Florence and Naples where he befriended Émile Bernard. He visited Spain, so the Prado Museum, where he saw Francisco de Goya, made charcoal drawings after Tadea Arias de Enriquez with Portrait of a woman and Portrait of Queen Maria Luiza and after Velazquez with Prince Baltazar Carlos in a hunting suit, King Philip IV, Bufón don Sebastián de Morra, etc.

With the exception of Grigorescu, Petrașcu also had made copies after Anton Chladek, Mihail Lapaty and George Demetrescu Mirea. After Lapaty he made three color drawings of Mihai Viteazu on horseback (at the National Military Museum, Romania) and after Mirea he replicated the composition of Szekler Peasants presenting to Mihai Viteazu the head of Andrew Báthory. Being secretary of the State Pinacoteca in Bucharest, Petrașcu permanently made drawings after the works of minor foreign painters or after the anonymous people who were in the Pinacoteca. Diana and Endymion were identified after Pietro Liberi, The Death of Seneca after Giuseppe Langetti, The woman with red hair after Jean-Jacques Henner, etc. Incomprehensible to the historians who studied his activity, the fact remained that Petrașcu sold through his personal exhibitions the drawings and copies he made.

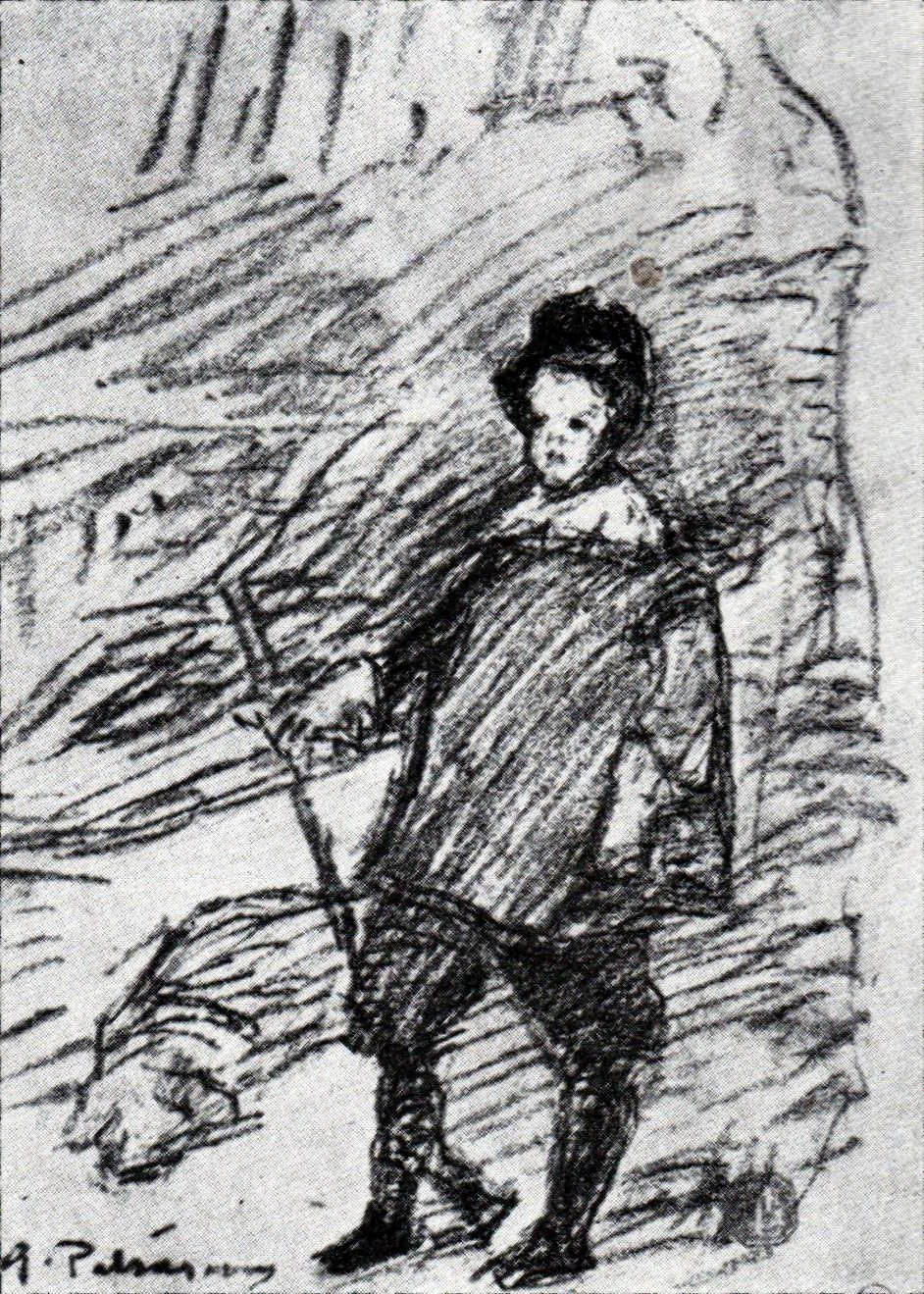
Baltazar Carlos in a hunting suit by Velasquez

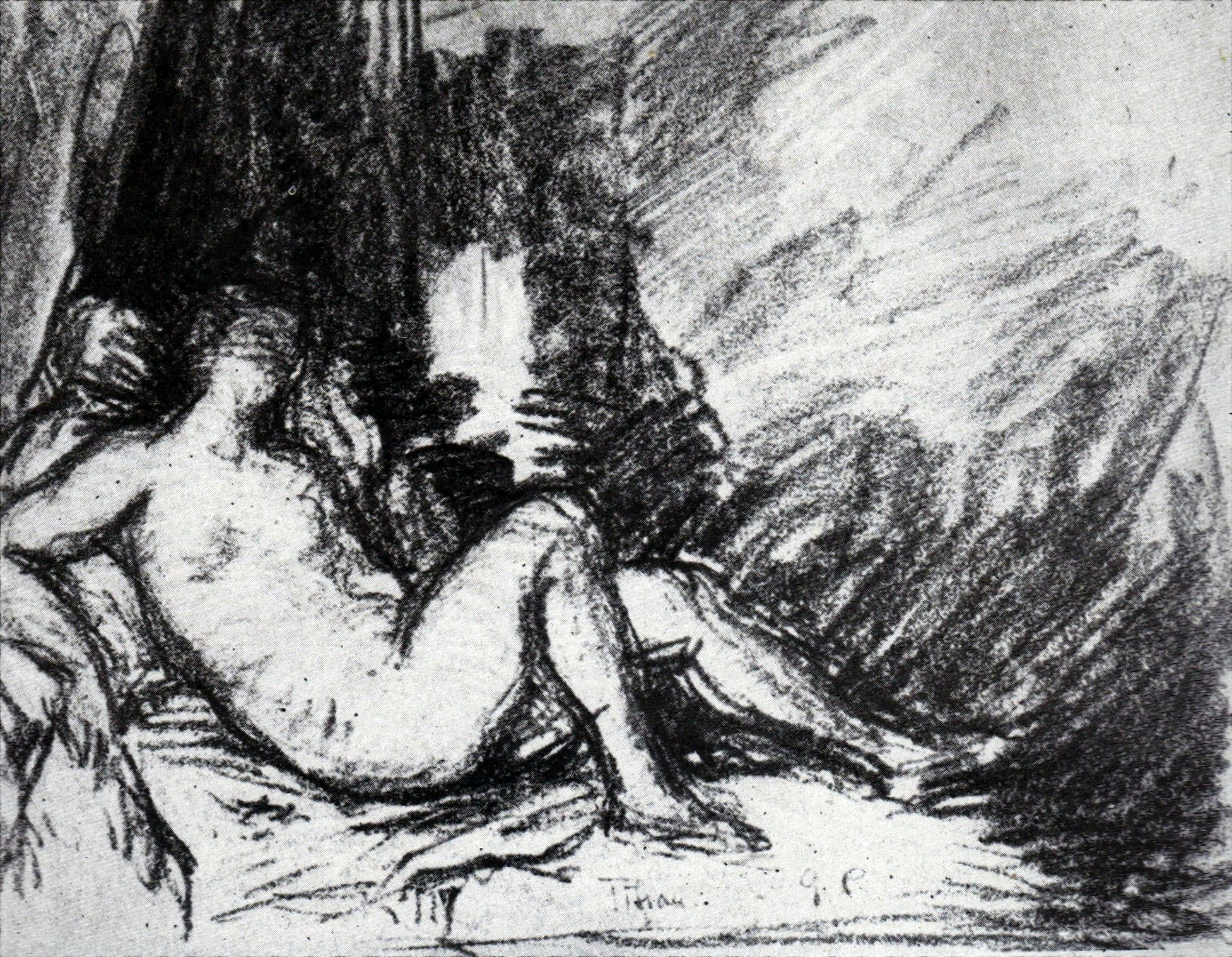
Danae - by Titian

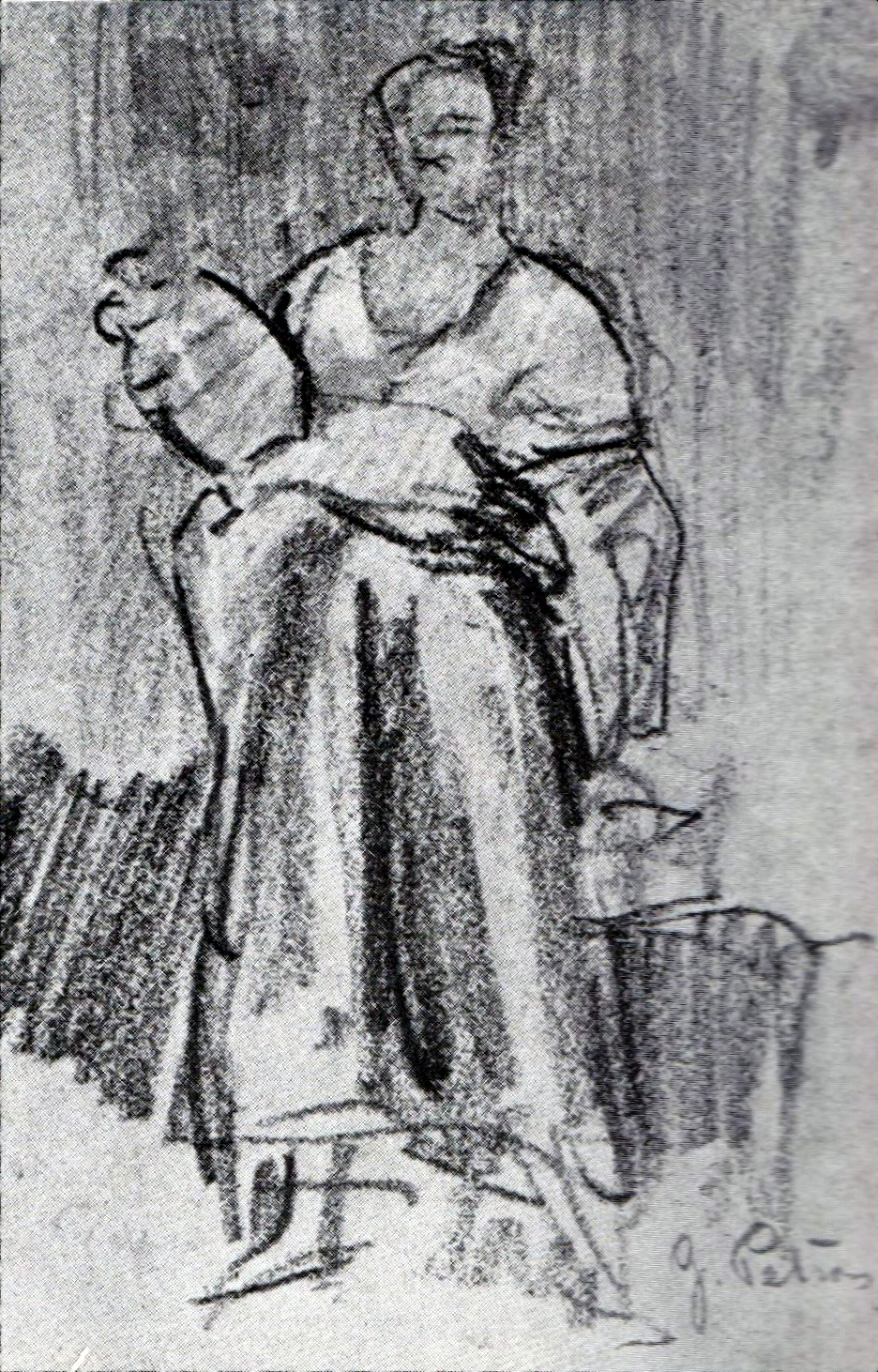
The women with a jar by Goya

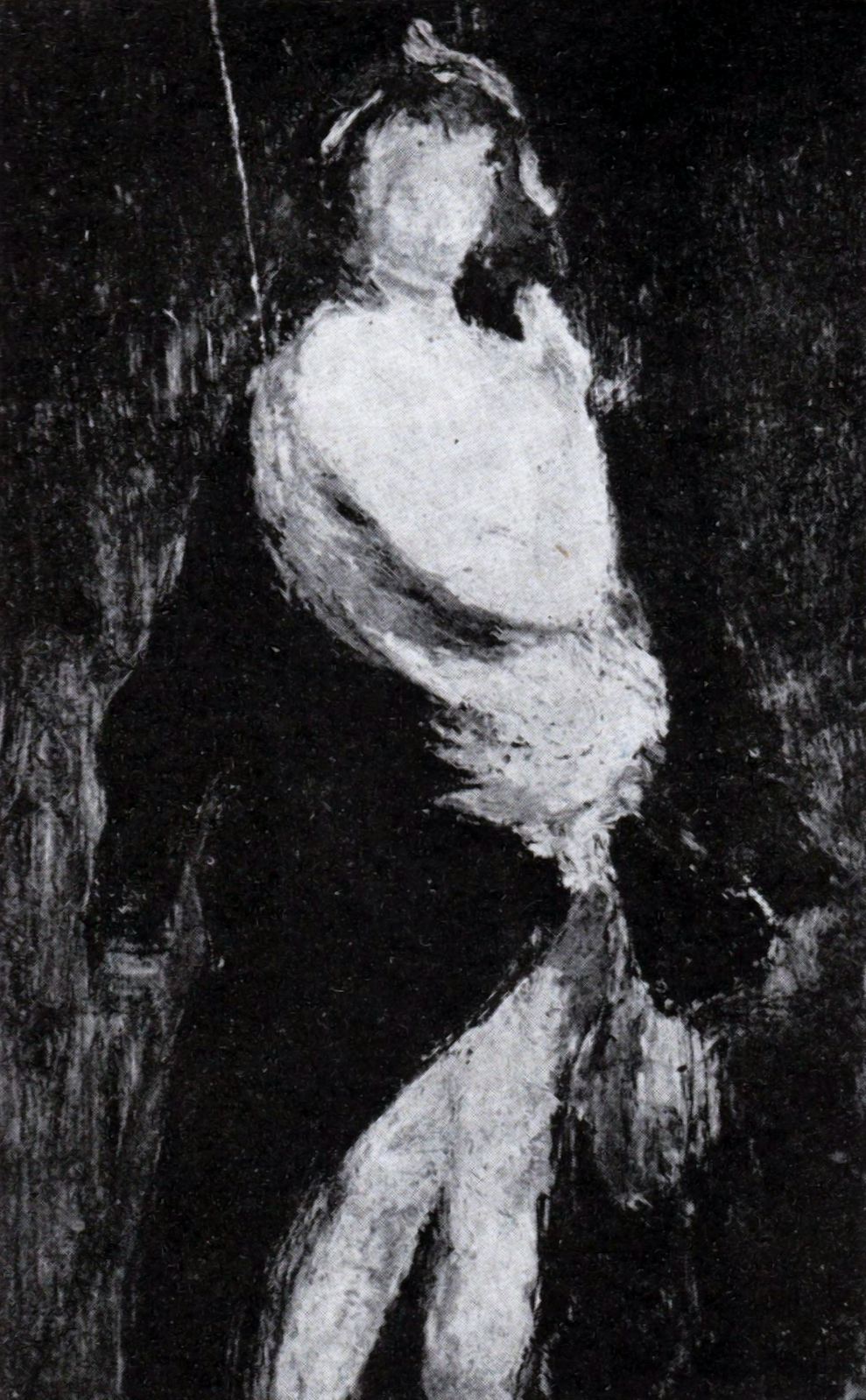
The Fur by Rubens

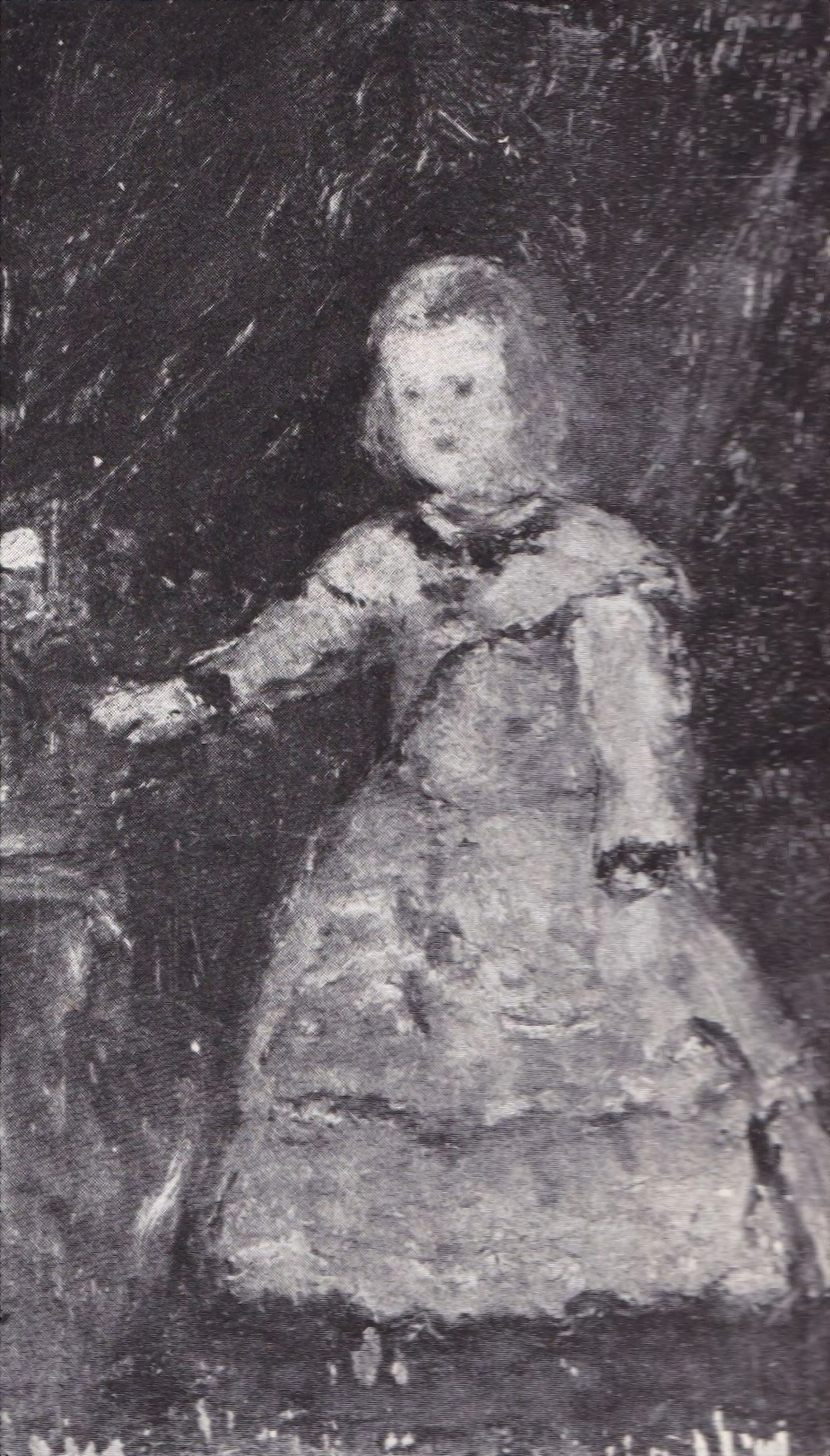
Infant Margarita – by Velasquez

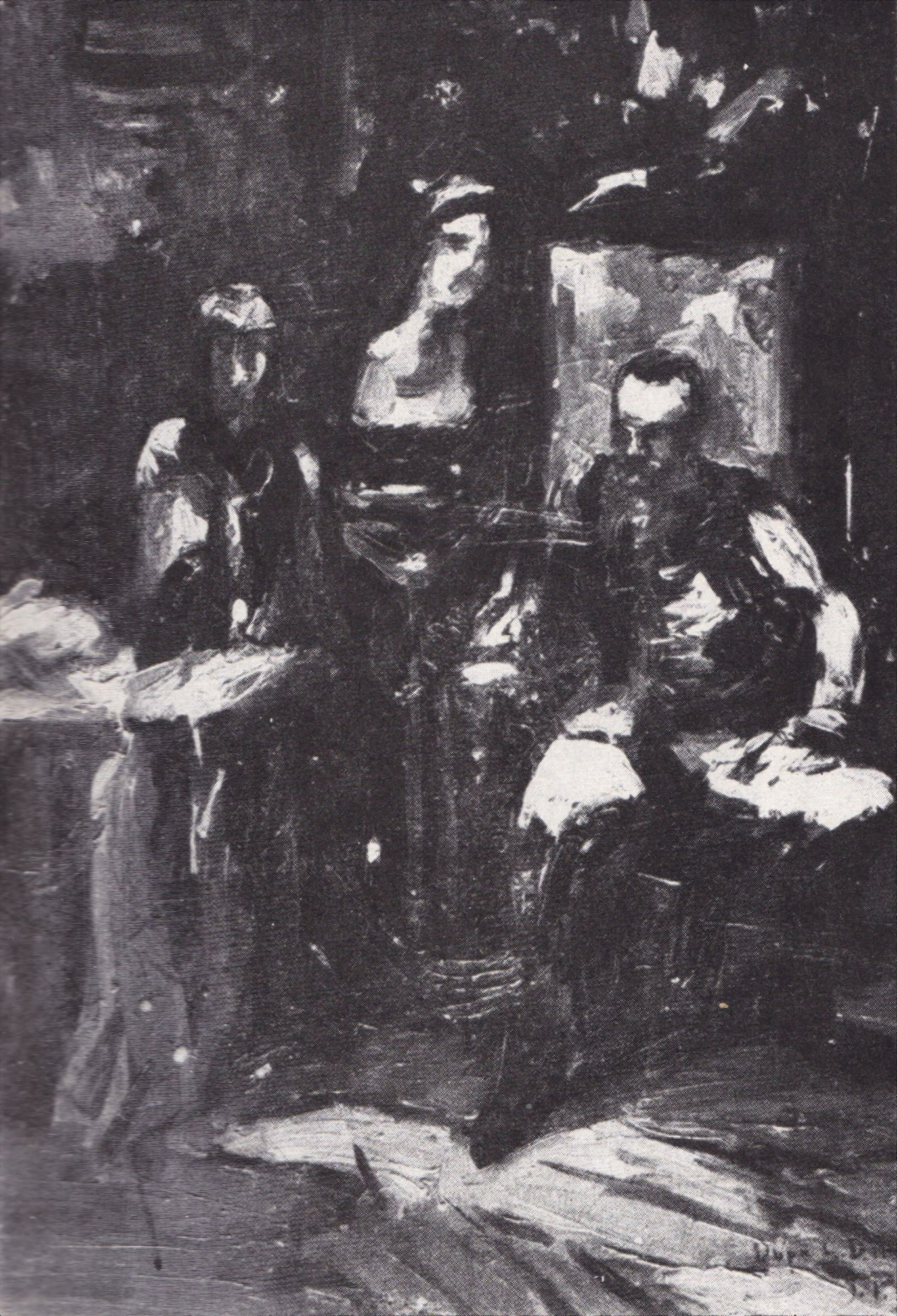
Mihai Viteazu on the head of the Andrew Báthory - by G.D. Mirea

As a result of the copies he made, echoes of the influence that Corot, Millet, Goya, Daumier, Courbet, Adolphe Monticelli, James Abbott McNeill Whistler, etc., had on Petrașcu's work can be discerned. Following Whistler's example, the Romanian painter began in 1915 to name works with Silver and Black, Black and Green, Rose and Black, Violet and Gold, Green and Gray, etc. Analyzing the painter's experiments after 1900, one can see the influences of Pierre Bonnard and Pierre-Auguste Renoir, Camille Pissarro, Alfred Sisley and Claude Monet, whom he indicated as his favorite master. He stated that he liked the works of Marcel Iancu, Picasso and even Constantin Brâncuși at that time when he was viewed with hostility. An important advice that Petrașcu gave to the engineer Romașcu for the acquisition of the Goodness of the Earth (Cumințenia pământului), a fact that happened later.

On the other hand, it cannot be considered that Gheorghe Petrașcu was an ardent follower of modernism. He sincerely admired the Impressionists and used some formulas adapted to his style, but he was also a traditionalist, a moderate and a circumspect in applying the new innovations, especially the most radical ones that manifested in those times in plastic art. Thus, he observed the best symbolist experiences and even followed this current, but soon gave up on it. Futurism, cubism, fauvism and other isms did not incite him even on a theoretical level. Significant are the statements he made regarding Marcel Iancu's work: "…I can't disapprove of modernists, even if they are so radical and even if I don't understand them ..." or about modernists "…how much about modern painting with all sorts of names, only those where the essential qualities of good painting dominate. The talented man in all the manifestations of art, as they will be called, does not matter, he will make outstanding works; the helpless will make banging and noise."

=== Identity searches ===
As it is known, Gheorghe Petrașcu had throughout his artistic career fifteen personal exhibits that were scheduled with some regularity, that is a unique case in Romania. In 1900, in December, at the Romanian Athenaeum, the first personal exhibit took place. On this occasion, Petrașcu presented, on cymas, 60 paintings that he had made three or four years before. As a consequence, according to the art critic 1900 was for Petrașcu one that belonged to the 19th century and not to the next one. He also motivated this statement by the fact that most of the paintings he exhibited belonged to the spirit and conception of the previous century. Only thirteen paintings were made in France, being landscapes of Montreuil, the rest having gender, urban, marine, mountain or rural landscapes topics. There were also self-portraits, pastel or oil portraits, but no interiors, still life or flowers.

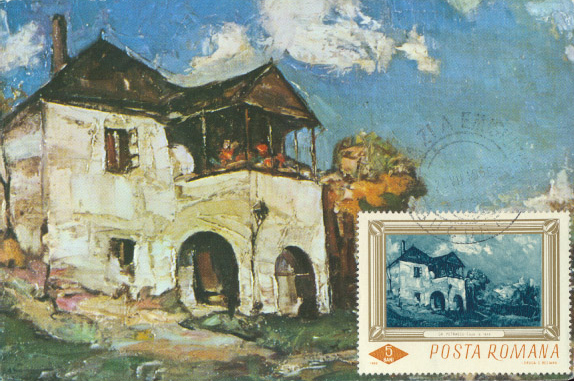
Country house also known as the House of Nicorești – postcard (1966)

The exhibition of 1900 represented for the art critic the defining element in following the artistic evolution of the Tecuci painter. The topic he displayed at the first exhibit represented for Petrașcu the strength of his subsequent artistic creation. The landscapes' topics were taken throughout life, from a geographical area of a size rarely reached by any other Romanian artist, the number of places found by art historians exceeding seventy. At the level of this year of the first personal exhibitions, the artist did not clarify his vision and did not find the most appropriate formulas of expression. There were many works left in the sketch stage, some of which were tired of too many executions, which led to an awkward impression of helplessness.

Nicolae Grigorescu and sămănătorism esthetics were the main factors influencing Petrașcu's art for the beginning of the 20th century. Grigorescu's shadow hovered tutelage even if the artist painted at Vitre, Montreuil or Târgu Ocna. But, from this period it was found by the art critics that there were differences between the emul and the master from Câmpina more and more important with the passage of time, so that the Grigorescian residues with time faded, finally leaving free the uniqueness of Petrașcu's work. His painting became more rocky and with a more pronounced material consistency. Unlike Grigorescu whose landscapes displayed a perspective that is lost in the distance, the landscapes designed by Petrașcu have limited spaces of all kinds of objects or obstacles (trees, houses, etc.) that close the horizon, so limit the perspective in one linear. As a result, neither the linear nor the aerial perspective have anything in common with the plein air conception, but they have both been transformed into one full of modernity that brings it closer with great strides to decorativism. This feature later evolved in the art of the Romanian painter and became a feature that individualized him as a style, from all the rest of his confreres.

However, there is another important feature present in Petrașcu's paintings. This can be defined by the unfinished aspect of the works, which shocked the artist's contemporaneity. Perceived as a critique of Nicolae Grigorescu's work, the definition of the non-finite made an epoch in those times. However, Gheorghe Petrașcu went even further. He pushed the technique to the point of creating an impression of negligence in the work. Nicolae Iorga stated that Petrașcu's landscapes have harsh colors, that they appear violently, are bitter and that his paintings can only be admired with a certain mood and only in certain circumstances. The style used by the artist was easily confused with Impressionism, which was exactly what he did: he had a contempt for form and smooth painted surfaces. Ștefan Petică was the first to classify Petrașcu as an impressionist in 1900. The critic Vasile Florea considered that this fact is not surprising because in those years, the impressionism in music and plastic art was subsumed to the symbolism that was understood as modernism, as opposed to academicism and traditionalism. Florea also stated that when Petică said impressionism, he was actually thinking of symbolism.

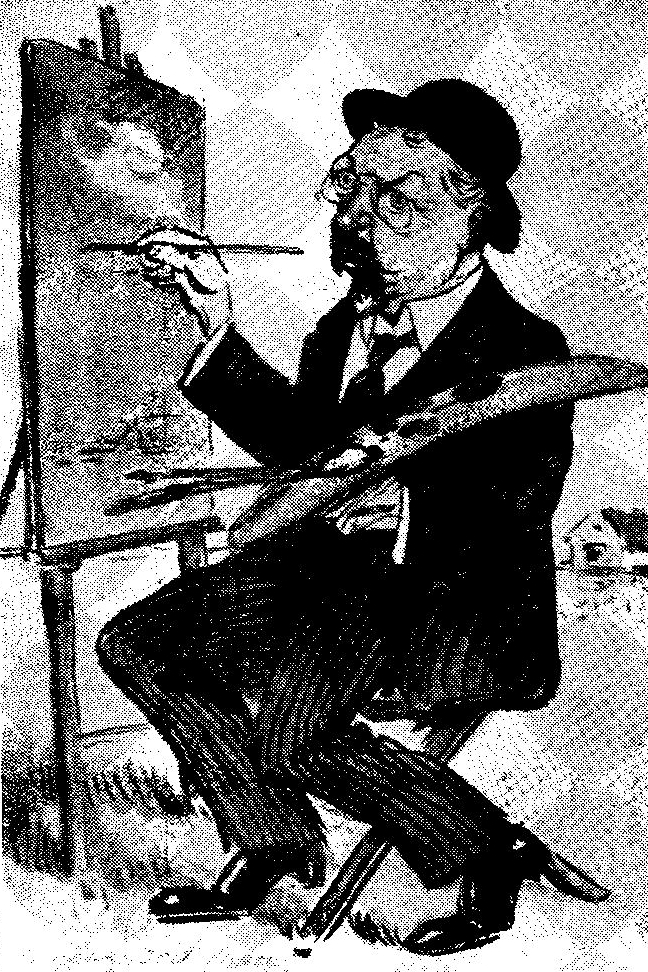
Petrașcu – portrait of Nicolae Petrescu-Găină

Other commentators on Petrașcu's work often called him an impressionist, with a pejorative meaning. Thus, Olimp Grigore Ioan, the editor of Literatură și artă română, wrote that: "...By his way of execution, this artist belongs entirely to the Impressionist school... Petrașcu indulged in a kind of hard impressionism that did not allows you to make a work of greater extent and power; In the genre he has adopted, he will always be condemned to do small works, a kind of sketch that can provoke the admiration of art enthusiasts when they indicate the steps of an artist in the execution of a powerful work, but which, in isolation, will always make you think of a certain impossibility of conception or execution." That is, in the sense of Vasile Florea, the commentators could not forgive the painter the sketch character he gave to his works, which led to confusion with the techniques of the Impressionist current.

Like Olimp Grigore Ioan was Mihail Dragomirescu who commented and stated that Petrașcu was in fact a direct descendant of the impressionism displayed by Grigorescu at the end of his career and that the sincerity of the impression resulting from his work is limited only to visuality. He also opined that this effect is characteristic of Impressionism and that art, as a result, is imperfect in its very essence. Virgil Cioflec mocked the chronicler for these opinions, for which reason in 1908, Dragomirescu returned with a more explicit argument "...Here is a painter whose deeply pictorial vision could take him very far, if he would be haunted beyond measure by the manner of impressionism whose leading representative in our country he is. His colored spots live; but their contours do not live long enough, of which he seems to have an instinctive horror." As Dragomirescu was a follower of academism, he categorized any freedom of expression as impressionism.

Petrașcu's annexation to Impressionism eventually became an art chronicle. This fact lasted until late, when Petrașcu already had a typical post-impressionist formula, as opposed to the current that appeared in France in the years 1860–70. A columnist from the magazine Contimporanul considered the painter a neo-impressionist, ie a pointillist who was a follower of Paul Signac and Georges Seurat. This happened in 1923, when Petrașcu had already made the Self-Portrait that is today in the Zambaccian Museum. The comments are fair but the misclassification "...Our only neo-impressionist has the quality of not being a virtuoso. It renders not impressions, but visions, dematerializing the aspects, deepening and achieving mystical harmonies, with the help of a fantastic color, of a hypersensitive paste."

== Opera ==
The last two decades of Gheorghe Petrașcu's artistic career are those that gave to the plastic art in Romania a work characterized by a full stylistic maturity, fact for which the paintings he made during this period gave the art critic the possibility to define and decipher most of the aesthetic coordinates that displayed the entire measure of Petrascian genius. As such, 1933, the year in which the artist opened a large retrospective exhibition at the Dalles Hall, where he presented to the Bucharest public over 300 works executed in oil technology and over 100 engravings, drawings and watercolors, can be considered a reference year in his creation. Starting with 1933, Petrașcu was seen as a painter deeply anchored in some unitary coordinates that led to a remarkable consistency in the use of pictorial material. Of course, the critical analysis of his work can be made at the level of 1936 when he was received as a member of the Romanian Academy, year in which he made another great exhibition or with the last great exhibition in 1940.

On the other hand, making an analysis of the work at a time of maturity would actually lead to a critical rigidity, because the diachronic slips towards the formation period of his artistic past are inherent. The edifying examples begin with the self-portraits, which must be approached starting with the first ones he made, or with the means of expression used, starting from romanticism, passing through impressionism.

To reach a state of grace of maturity, Petrașcu went through a difficult and slow evolution that required his tenacity and patience. As presented above, in his youth he oscillated between contradictory tendencies such as sămănătorism and modernism, especially symbolism. The artist tried to reconcile the two directions, which later translated into his own intimate art formula. The intimate nature of the new style brought by Gheorghe Petrașcu is argued, in the opinion of the art critic Vasile Florea, by the continuous increase of the number of works with still lifes, interiors and flowers.

=== Sources of style ===
An obvious feature in Petrascian's work is the mutation that occurred in the artist's relationship to romanticism, which translates as a constant feature in his creation. If at the beginning of his career, he found his expression in choosing the motive, later, as he evolved, he was included in the deep drama of the work. It is unlikely that Petrașcu would have had something in common with the literary-artistic romanticism that historically crossed the Europe of the 19th century and so widespread in Romania. Gheorghe Petrașcu belongs as an attitude and temperament to the romantic type, as defined by George Călinescu in the essay Classicism, romanticism, baroque, which also gave a recipe for identifying the behavior, the hero or the type of romantic author. Just as Călinescu also mentioned that the two types romantic and classical do not exist in a pure state, but only as mixtures and compromises, neither can Petrașcu be classified as a pure romantic. The prevalence of romantic elements can be seen in it, as the romantics Rembrandt, Goya and Delacroix showed it. Petrașcu's intellectual tendency towards romanticism is demonstrated by the admiration he had in his youth for Mihai Eminescu, which he also paid homage to in his own way.

Those familiar with Petrașcu's artistic career know that he was passionate about Byron at one point, while admiring the works of the romantics Delacroix, Titian, Goya, Diego Velázquez and Rembrandt. He made children after them, as well as after the Romanians Mihail Lapaty, a student of Ary Scheffer, and G. D. Mirea, his drama being a basic element of romanticism. Another existing element in Petrascian's work is the appetite he had for the night landscape, which in romanticism is a selenary one compared to the one displayed by classicism as a solar one. Similar to the romantic poets, Eminescu being one of them, Gheorghe Petrașcu was a follower of the moonlight, even if Nicolae Grigorescu, seeing the exaggerated tendency towards the mysteries of the night and the poetic twilights, told him that "...my dear, it is so hard to paint during the day, let alone at night." At such a remark, the artist replied with "...Master, for me painting means poetry. Especially the evening, the starry sky, the mysteries of the night disturb me deeply and I feel the need to transpose them on the canvas."

The spell of the moon flooding a world of mysterious shadows is not a setting on which Petrașcu projected his melancholy, as it was for the English Lakers, Mihai Eminescu or for Caspar David Friedrich, Leopardi or Chateaubriand, but it was a propensity for the esoteric symbolist. On the other hand, it is also true that symbolism is somehow a form of romance. The artist's appetite for black and a dark color range, especially in its early stages, can be explained by his preference for the effects of the night. That is why the statement is revealing that being haunted by the mystery of black "...Petrașcu sometimes brings the brilliance of the precious color, I don't know how deaf, imperceptible goyish pleasure for the ugly". Because as Vasile Florea says "...and the ugly is also a romantic category, the classics simply not being able to conceive it. And with the abundance of black in his canvases, Petrașcu certainly remembers Goya. With one difference, however: while the Spanish painter is radiant in his youth, gradually darkening towards the age of old age – see some paintings in "Quinta del sordo" – with the exception of The Milkmaid of Bordeaux, his swan song, Petrașcu traverses the road in the opposite direction, that is, from darkness to light. And what a drama in this change of face!"

== In memoriam ==
- in Tecuci there is a Gymnasium School no. 2 is named in honor of Gheorghe Petrașcu;
- a street in Tecuci and one in Bucharest are named in honor of Gheorghe Petrașcu;
- a park in sector 3 of Bucharest is called in honor of artist, Gheorghe Petrașcu Park;
- The "Gheorghe Petrașcu" Biennial of Fine Arts Competition, which has a national character, was founded in 1992 in Târgoviște. The stated purpose of the biennial is to enrich the art collections of the local Art Museum. Thus, all the works that have been or will be awarded over the years automatically enter the patrimony of the Art Museum.
In memoriam - philately - Gheorghe Petrașcu

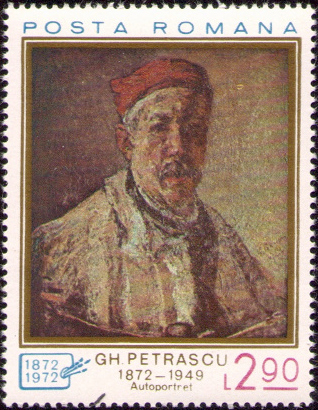
Self-portrait

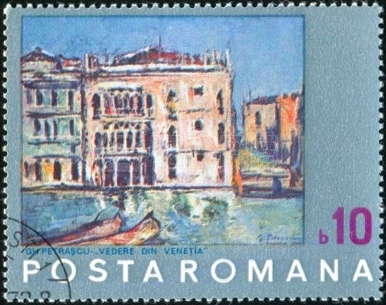
Painting of Venice

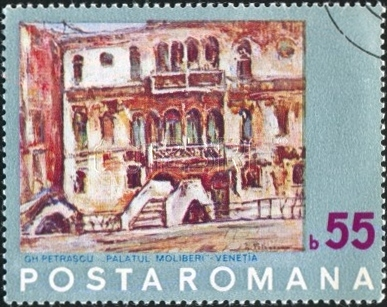
Molibieri Palace, Venice

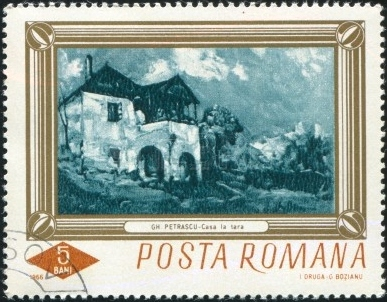
Country house
- In 1972, George Oprescu published Gheorghe Petrașcu – Homage album 100 years after his birth, Intreprinderea Poligrafică Arta Grafică, Bucharest.
- In 1972, on the 100th anniversary of the artist's birth, the National Gallery in Bucharest organized a retrospective exhibition with a selection of his works from major museums and collections in Romania, revealing the stylistic authenticity of a Romanian painter of some European value.
- The art galleries in Tecuci are named in the honor of the painter, the "Gheorghe Petrașcu" Art Galleries.
- Homage exhibition on the occasion of the 140th anniversary of the birth of the painter Gheorghe Petrașcu at the Panait Istrati County Library in Brăila on 20 November 2012.

== Chronology ==
- 1872 – Gheorghe Petrașcu was born on 1 December in Tecuci. He was the son of Costache Petrovici and Elena Bițu-Dimitriu. He also had two brothers: Nicolae Petrașcu, writer and publicist, and Vasile Petrașcu (1863–1945), physician.
- 1889 – finished the classes of the gymnasium from Tecuci. He was noticed by the drawing teacher Gheoghe Ulinescu. In the same year he entered the Royal High School in Brăila.
- 1892 – he graduated from the high school in Brăila, took the baccalaureate and was admitted to the Faculty of Natural Sciences in Bucharest, whose courses he attended for two years.
- 1893 – enrolled in parallel at the School of Fine Arts in Bucharest.
- 1898 – graduated from the School of Fine Arts and with the help of Nicolae Grigorescu obtained a scholarship abroad. In the autumn of this year he made a short stop in Munich, after which he left for Paris and enrolled at the Académie Julian. He had W. Bouguereau, Benjamin Constant and Gabriel Ferrier as teachers. He often returned to Romania or traveled to other European countries.
- 1900 – in December he opened his first personal exhibition at the Romanian Athenaeum.
- 1901 – on 3 December, together with Ipolit Strâmbulescu, Ștefan Popescu, Arthur Verona, Kimon Loghi, Nicolae Vermont, Frederic Storck and Ștefan Luchian, he was a founding member of the Artistic Youth Society.
- 1902 – together with Ferdinand Earle made a trip to England, Holland, Belgium and Germany.
- 1903 – between 27 November and 24 December, he opened his second solo exhibition at the Romanian Athenaeum.
- 1904 – traveled to Italy, Florence and Naples, where he befriended the French painter Émile Bernard.
- 1905 – participated in the International Art Exhibition in Munich.
- 1906 – December 1906 – January 1907 made a trip to Aswan in Egypt.
- 1907 – between 5 February and 1 March, he opened his third solo exhibition at the Romanian Athenaeum.
- 1908 – participated in the competition for the drawing department at the School of Fine Arts in Bucharest. The contest was preceded by an exhibition with the works of competitors Octav Băncilă, Jean Alexandru Steriadi, Frederic Storck, Arthur Verona, Apcar Baltazar, Dimitrie Paciurea and others. He failed to win the contest.
- 1909 – began to participate in the official Salons of painting, sculpture and architecture. He won the second prize and an amount of 1000 lei.
- 1910 – participated in the first permanent exhibition of painting and sculpture of the Art Society. He was present with five paintings at the exhibition of Alexandru Vlahuță's collection opened at the Palace of Officials.
- 1911 – participated in the exhibition of the Art Society. He married Lucreția C. Marinescu, who was also his favorite model.
- 1912–presented at the Artistic Youth exhibition with 41 paintings, having only one exhibition hall for him.
- 1913 – 3 March – 4 April, he opened the fourth solo exhibition at the Romanian Athenaeum.
- 1914 – participated in the Exhibition of living artists. He was appointed curator at the State Art Gallery.
- 1915 – opened his fifth solo exhibition at the Romanian Athenaeum.
- 1916 – was one of the exhibitors at the Galerie Artistique de Independence Roumaine.
- 1917 – during the German occupation of Bucharest he participated in the Exhibition of Romanian Artists in Bucharest with five paintings.
- 1918 – began to work with metal engraving.
- 1919 – 3 March – 1 April, he opened the sixth solo exhibition at the Romanian Athenaeum.
- 1921 – 13 March – 5 April, he opened the seventh solo exhibition at the Romanian Athenaeum.
- 1922 – he built a house in Târgoviște where he spent the summers. In this place he created the most beautiful paintings.
- 1923 – 15 February – 14 March, he opened the eighth solo exhibition at the Romanian Athenaeum.
- 1924 – exhibited 10 paintings at the Venice Biennale. He participated in the official Salon in Bucharest.
- 1925 – 30 April – 31 May, he opened the ninth personal exhibition organized at the House of Arts. He participated in the official Salon, where he is awarded the National Prize, and with 12 works at the Exhibition of Old and Modern Romanian Art organized at the Musee du Jeu de Paume in Paris. He participated in the Exhibition of Romanian painting, sculpture and folk art in Sinaia. He participated in the Exhibition of Moldovan painters based in Bucharest organized at the Romanian Life Hall.
- 1926 – 18 April – 16 May, the tenth solo exhibition took place at the House of Arts. In November, he participated in the Collective Fine Arts Exhibition at the Hasefer bookstore in Doamnei Street no. 20. Also in November, he exhibited at the event Representative Romanian painters and sculptors that took place in the Grigorescu hall on Paris street no. 20.
- 1927 – in April he exhibited at the official Salon. On 30 September at the Exposition d’art roumain. Congress of the Latin press – Bucharest. On 26 December at the Retrospective Exhibition of Romanian artists, painters and sculptors from the last 50 years.
- 1928 – the eleventh personal exhibition took place between 1 and 26 April at the House of Arts. Also in April he was present at the official Salon and in October at the Drawing and Engraving Salon.
- 1929 – April – Official Salon. He participated on 4 October in the Romania event at the International Exhibition in Barcelona. Here he is awarded the Grand Prize. In November he went to the Drawing and Engraving Salon. He was appointed director of the State Art Gallery. He held this position until 1940, when he retired.
- 1930 – participated in the Exhibition of Romanian Modern Art in Brussels, The Hague and Amsterdam. Between 4 and 31 May, he opened the twelfth personal exhibition at the House of Arts. He participated in the group exhibition entitled The First Salon of the Universe.
- 1931 – April – Official Salon. October – Drawing and engraving salon. October – Exhibition of modern art.
- 1932 – Official Salon and Autumn Salon. It is the year in which he was awarded the Legion of Honor by the French government.
- 1933 – 21 May – 1 July – the thirteenth personal exhibition at the Dalles Hall.
- 1935 – participated in the International Exhibition in Brussels.
- 1936 – the fourteenth solo exhibition between 18 March and 14 April at the Dalles Hall. It is the year in which he became a member of the Romanian Academy.
- 1937 – becomes a founding member of the Arta group. Participates in the International Exhibition in Paris where he received the Grand Prize of Honor.
- 1938 – exhibited 30 works at the Venice Biennale.
- 1940 – opened the last, fifteenth, personal exhibition at the Dalles Hall.
- 1942 – participates in the Venice Biennale. This year he became ill and stopped working. In the following years, he only sent works made in the past to the main exhibition events in the country and abroad.
- 1949 – on 1 May, he died in Bucharest.
