= List of painters from Romania =

This is a list of painters from Romania.

== A ==
- Theodor Aman
- Ion Andreescu
- Ion Valentin Anestin
- Nina Arbore
- Gheorghe Asachi

== B ==
- Corneliu Baba
- Liviu Cornel Babeș
- Aurel Băeșu
- Auguste Baillayre
- Tatiana Baillayre
- Sabin Bălașa
- Octav Băncilă
- Ignat Bednarik
- Radu Bercea
- Horia Bernea
- Zsolt Bodoni
- Alexandru Bogdan-Pitești
- Friedrich von Bömches
- Victor Brauner
- Marius Bunescu

== C ==
- Ștefan Câlția
- Silvia Cambir
- Mateiu Caragiale
- Henri Catargi
- Alexandru Ciucurencu
- Aurel Ciupe
- Nicolae Comănescu
- Lena Constante
- Arthur Coulin
- Noche Crist

== D ==
- Horia Damian
- Nicolae Dărăscu
- Alexandru Darida
- Margarete Depner
- Ștefan Dimitrescu
- Felicia Donceanu
- Alexandru Donici
- Eugen Drăguțescu
- Natalia Dumitresco
- Georges Dumitresco
- Zamfir Dumitrescu

== G ==
- Marin Georgescu
- Adrian Ghenie
- Dumitru Ghiață
- Ion Grigorescu
- Lucian Grigorescu
- Nicolae Grigorescu
- Nicolae Gropeanu

== H ==
- Petre Hârtopeanu
- Vasile Hutopilă

== I ==
- Semproniu Iclozan
- Sorin Ilfoveanu
- Iosif Iser
- Alexandre Istrati

== J ==
- Stefan Jäger
- Marcel Janco

== L ==
- Myra Landau
- Constantin Lecca
- Ștefan Luchian

== M ==
- Victor Man
- Tasso Marchini
- János Mattis-Teutsch
- Henry Mavrodin
- M. H. Maxy
- Friedrich Miess
- George Demetrescu Mirea
- Ioan Mirea
- Teodor Moraru
- Pârvu Mutul

== N ==
- Alexandra Nechita
- Mihai Nechita
- Jean Negulesco
- Ion Negulici
- Romul Nuțiu

== P ==
- Neculai Păduraru
- Theodor Pallady
- Gheorghe Panaiteanu Bardasare
- Lili Pancu
- Paul Păun
- Jean de Paleologu
- Ștefan Pelmuș
- Gheorghe Petrașcu
- Costin Petrescu
- Laura Poantă
- Julius Podlipny
- Gabriel Popa
- Elena Popea
- Gheorghe Popovici
- Mișu Popp
- Virgil Preda
- Florica Prevenda

== R ==
- Silvia Radu
- Stefan Ramniceanu
- Alma Redlinger
- Camil Ressu
- Constantin Daniel Rosenthal
- Reuven Rubin
- Maria Rusescu

== S ==
- Edmond van Saanen Algi
- Mandy Sand
- Dimitrie Serafim
- Victor Schivert
- Rudolf Schweitzer-Cumpăna
- Mihail Simonidi
- Constantin Daniel Stahi
- Jean Alexandru Steriadi
- Hedda Sterne
- Eustațiu Stoenescu
- Cecilia Cuțescu-Storck
- Ipolit Strâmbu

== Ș ==
- Gheorghe Șaru
- Francisc Șirato
- Raoul Șorban
- George Ștefănescu

== T ==
- Eugen Taru
- Gheorghe Tattarescu
- Nicolae Teodorescu
- Ion Theodorescu-Sion
- János Thorma
- Nicolae Tonitza
- Henric Trenk
- Traian Trestioreanu

== Ț ==
- Ion Țuculescu

== V ==
- Nicolae Vermont
- Leon Viorescu
- Eugeniu Voinescu
- Lascăr Vorel

== Z ==
- Victor Zâmbrea

== See also ==
- Culture of Romania
