= Georgeta Năpăruș =

Romanian painter (1930–1997)

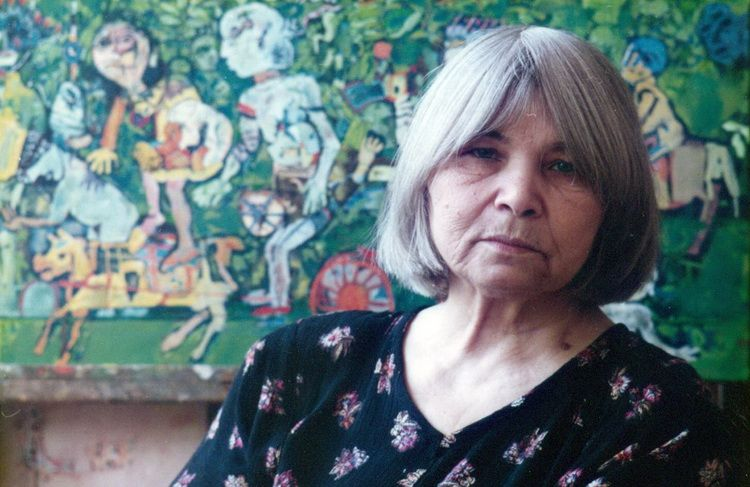
- Năpăruș in her studio, in the 1990s
- Born: 23 October 1930; Comarnic, Prahova County, Kingdom of Romania
- Died: 9 July 1997 (aged 66); Bucharest, Romania
- Resting place: Cernica Monastery
- Education: Rudolf Schweitzer-Cumpăna (professor); Institutul de Arte Plastice "Nicolae Grigorescu"
- Known for: Painting
- Notable work: Printul (painting, 1990)
- Movement: modernism
- Spouses: Petre Sava Băleanu (m. 1958; div. 1964) Octav Grigorescu (m. 1965; died 1987)
- Website: Official website

Georgeta Năpăruș (23 October 1930 – 9 July 1997) was a Romanian modernist painter. She is known for combining traditional folkloric themes with modern styles.

== Biography ==
=== Early life ===
Born in 1930 to Angela Năpăruș (née Pădurice) and Vasile Năpăruș (b. 1901) in Comarnic, a small town on the main road between Bucharest and Transylvania. Georgeta's family owned a rural home in the hills of Secăria. She went to secondary school in Sinaia, a twenty-minute train ride away where she became friends with Ilinca Cherbatchev, the musician. Her father was a clerk in the mayor's office and owned a radio. Her mother was a housewife who practised traditional folk remedies and counselled young wives in the neighbourhood.

Her family opposed an artistic career, but she enrolled at the Fine Arts Institute "Nicolae Grigorescu" in 1951, without preparation, earning provisional admission. During the harshest years of communist rule, she studied under professors Corina Lecca, Titina Călugăru, and Adina Paula Moscu. In 1957, she completed her B.A. under Rudolf Schweitzer-Cumpăna, submitting a painting titled Rug Weavers (Țesătoare de covoare).

=== Career ===
She worked without steady state employment, an arrangement facilitated by her affiliation with the Artists' Guild during a period when unemployment was legally prohibited. She actively participated in major exhibitions, including the Salonul Anual.

Between 1965 and 1973, Romania reduced the state mandate for proletcultist art. This shift enabled artists greater exposure to international movements. Năpăruș, who had previously travelled to Prague and East Berlin, subsequently travelled to Italy. Her work, alongside that of Grigorescu, who attended the Venice Biennale in 1968, gained broader exposure through international group exhibitions.

She maintained a studio on Iulia Hasdeu Street, where she was part of a community of contemporary artists. In 1966, she relocated to a studio on Pangrati Street, located across from the Romanian Television broadcasting building in Bucharest.

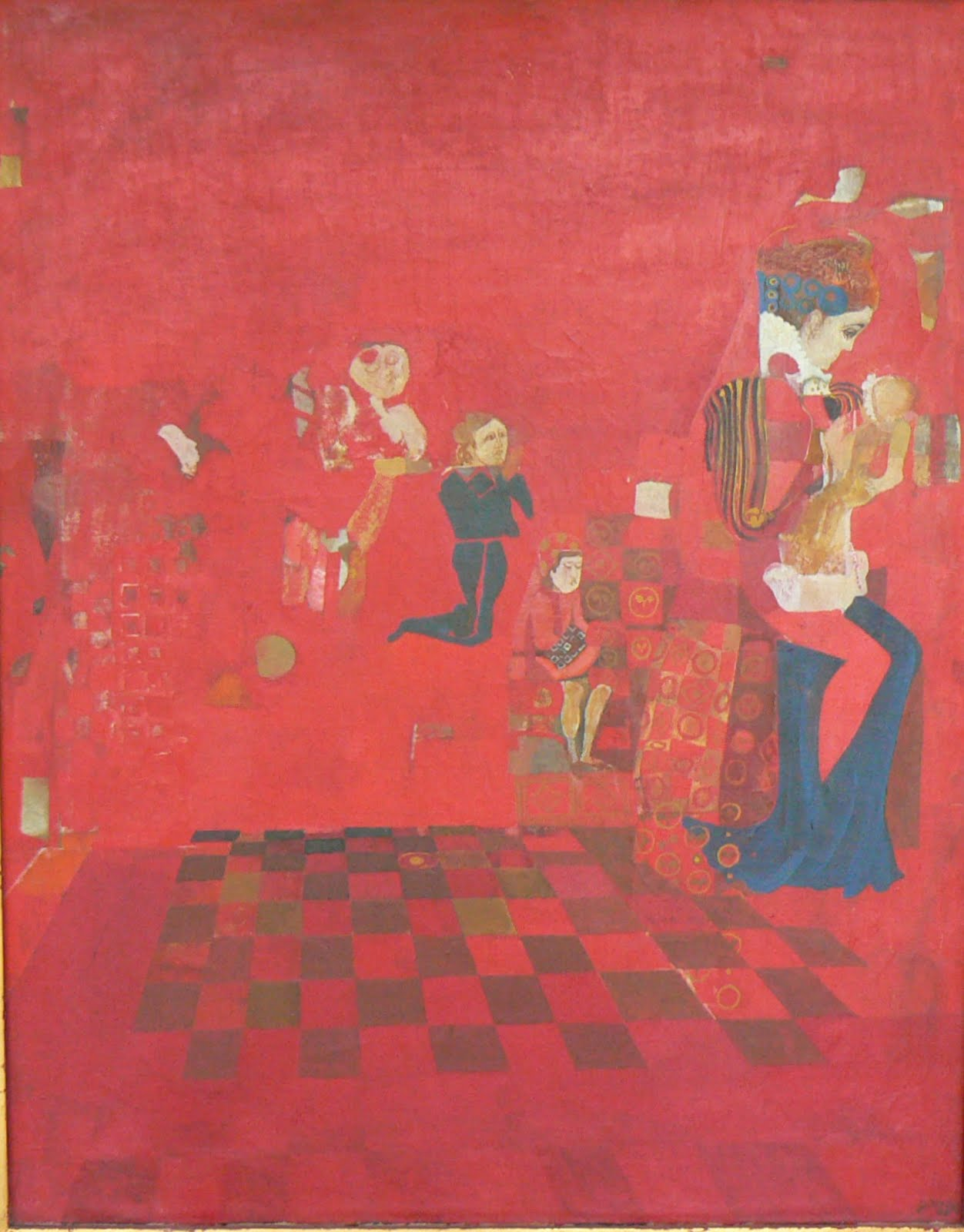
Georgeta Năpăruș, Legend Oil on canvas, 1969.

Năpăruș often used themes of birth, motherhood, domestic life, and nature within her works, and these themes became more prominent in her imagery following the birth of her son in 1967. Her compositions during this period have recurring motifs such as brides, grooms, princes, and dolls associated with traditional folk archetypes and the structured patterns of Orthodox iconography. Her early works typically feature structured compositions, smooth surfaces, and rounded contours, and were often executed on a larger scale.

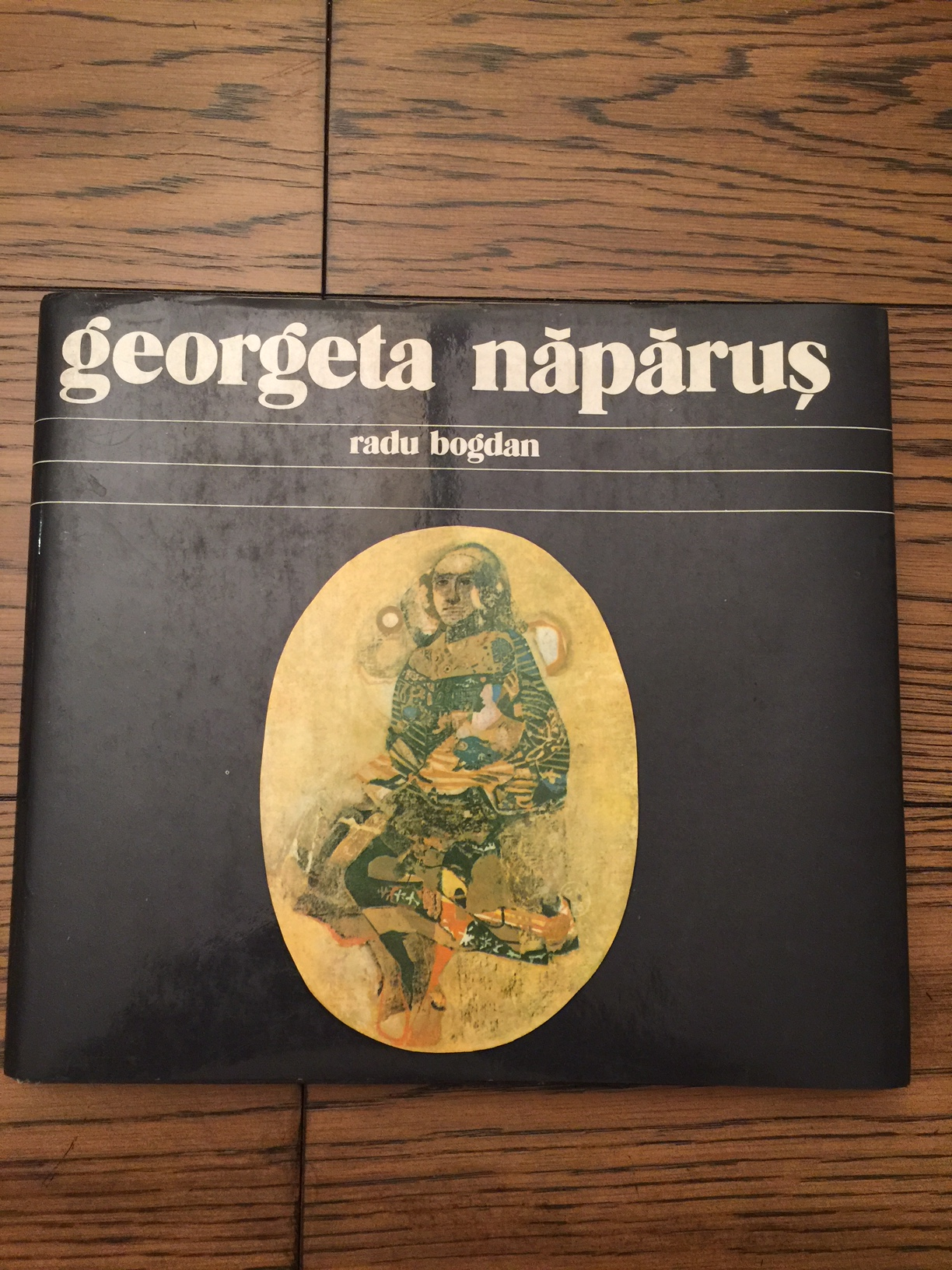
The cover of the monograph by Radu Bogdan, Editura Meridiane, 1983

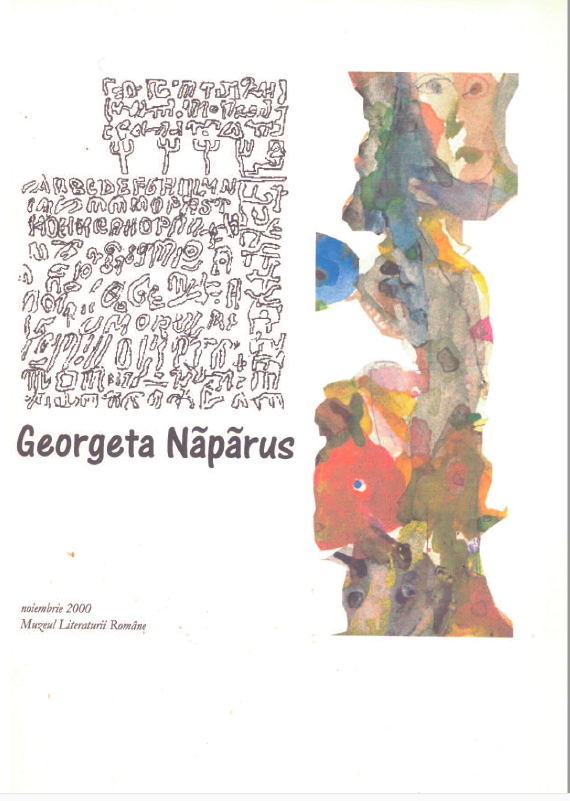
Catalogue cover, 2000.

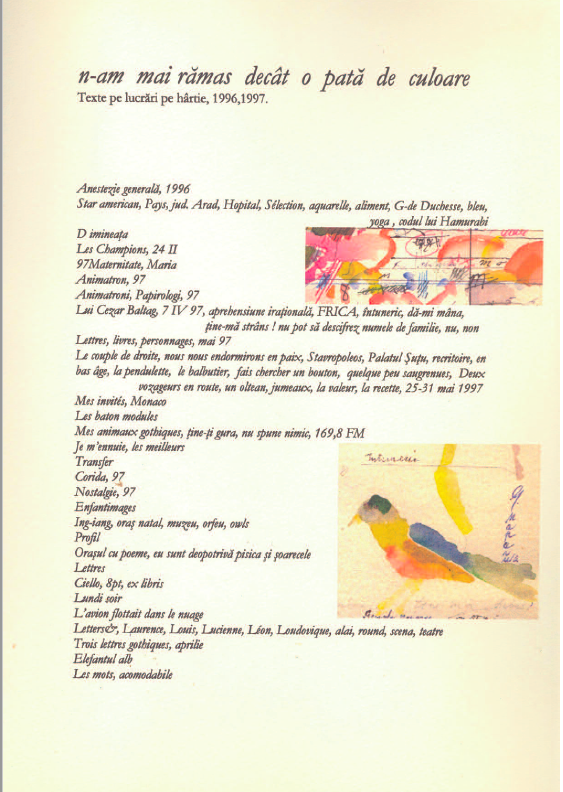
From the catalogue of the exhibition at the Museum of Romanian Literature, 2000. Editor: Ion Grigorescu. Text: Ioana Vlasiu

Năpăruș noted an interest in the imagery of Jean Dubuffet and was influenced by the work of Victor Brauner. Romanian traditional embroidery, textiles, and religious iconography from the Romanian Orthodox Church also provided significant aesthetic reference points throughout her life. In her final years, her drawing style developed similarities to the graphic approach of her late husband, Octav Grigorescu.

=== Personal life ===
She married television show director Petre Sava Băleanu in 1958. The marriage ended in divorce in 1964, though they maintained a friendship until his death in 1976. She later married fellow artist Octav Grigorescu, whom she had previously known during art school.

=== Death ===
Năpăruș remained productive after 1989, despite experiencing declining health and depression. In 1995, she experienced severe physical numbness that eventually resulted in paralysis from the upper chest down. She continued to work from her bed, adapting her practice to drawings, watercolours, and mixed media on paper. During this final period, she produced over one hundred works.

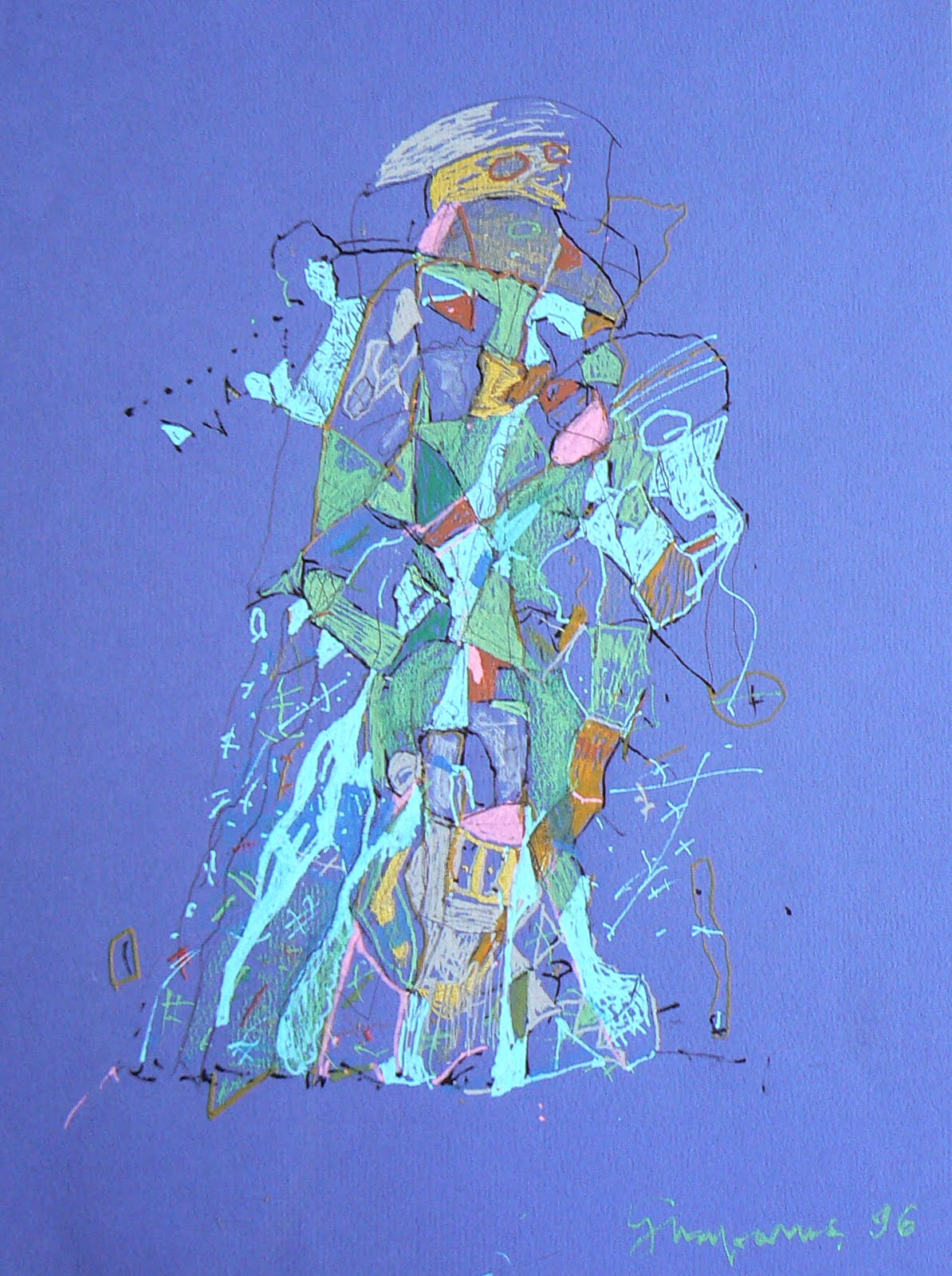
Georgeta Năpăruș, 1996. Drawing on paper.

She was buried at Cernica Monastery, near Bucharest, alongside her husband, Octav Grigorescu.

During the economic difficulties of the 1980s, official state patronage for the arts declined, and a significant portion of Năpăruș's work was acquired by foreign diplomats, visitors, and collectors, including Marina Dimitropulous and Geoffrey Tyler, whose collection was later preserved by the University of Tasmania.

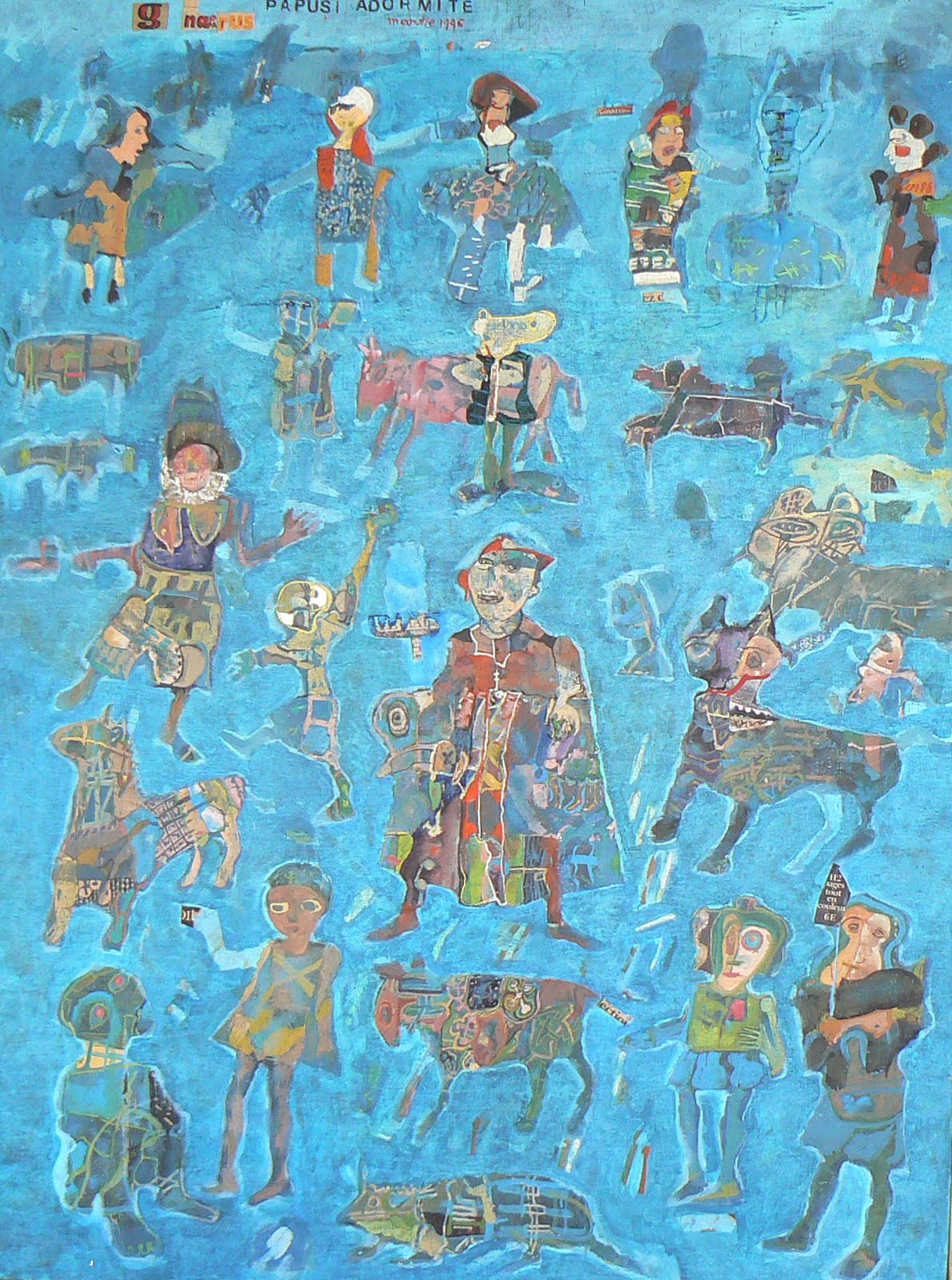
Georgeta Năpăruș. Sleeping dolls. Oil on canvas, 1990's.

== Works ==
=== Group exhibitions ===
- Budapest, Novi-Sad, Belgrade, Zagreb (1966); Prague (1968, 1971); Tel-Aviv, Moscow, Tallinn, Helsinki (1969), Turin (1970); Hague, Middlesbrough, Tyneside, Warsaw, Leningrad (1972); Madrid, Moscow, Washington DC, Montevideo, Buenos Aires, São Paulo, Brasilia, Lima, Ulan Bator, Leipzig, Pyongyang, Chicago, Oshkosh (1973); Caracas, Quebec, Berlin, Athens, Havana, Warsaw (1974); Baghdad, Islamabad (1975); Sofia, Helsinki, Turku, Budapest (1976); Beijing, Shanghai, Lisbon (1977); Lakewood, Milwaukee, Pleven (1978); Ciudad de Mexico, Guadalajara, Madrid, Ottawa, Berlin, Voipaala (1979); Athens (1984); Germany (1991).
- Cagnes-sur-Mer (1970)
- São Paulo biennale (1971)
- Valparaiso biennale (1983)

=== Solo exhibitions ===
- Muzeul Țării Crișurilor, Oradea (1976)
- Sala Dalles, București (1980)
- Muzeul de Artă din Ploiești (1980);
- Muzeul de Artã din Cluj (1980);
- Galeria Emst Michael Winter, Hamburg (1981);
- Institutul Italian de culturã, București (1985);
- Institutul francez, București (1992);
- Artexpo - Galeria etaj 3-4 Teatrul Național, București (1994);
- Retrospectiva, Muzeul Literaturii Române, București (2000);
- Secvențe anii '60-'70, Galeria Veroniki Art, București (2008);

== Recognition ==
- Revista Arta magazine prize (1968, 1970)
- The prize of the Artist Guild (Premiul Uniunii Artiștilor Plastici) (1966),
- The prize of the Sophia Triennale (1982),
- Raffaelo prize (1985),
- Special prize of the Jury of the Artist Guild (Premiul special al juriului al U.A.P.) (1991)

== Bibliography ==
- Radu Bogdan - Georgeta Năpăruș, Ed. Meridiane, București, 1983
- Nina Cassian - Prefață la catalogul expoziției „Georgeta Năpăruș”, Muzeul Țării Crișurilor, Oradea, 1976
- C.R. Constantinescu - O artă limpede, accesibilă, profundă, Scânteia tineretului, Sept. 1969
- Ion Frunzetti - Logica legendei și basmului, România Literară, Oct. 1971
- Constantin Prut - „Georgeta Năpăruș” în Dicționar de Artă Modernă și Contemporană, Editura Albatros, București, 1982, p. 320-321
- Georgeta Năpăruș - Catalogul Expoziției „Secvențe anii '60-'70”, Galeria Veroniki Art, București, 2008
- Octavian Barbosa - „Georgeta Năpăruș” în Dicționarul artiștilor plastici contemporani, Editura Meridiane, București, 1976
- Catalogul Expoziției Retrospective Georgeta Năpăruș, Muzeul Literaturii Române, București, 2000
