= Octav Grigorescu =

Important figure in Romanian art

- Born: May 22, 1933; Bucharest, Kingdom of Romania
- Died: February 2, 1987 (aged 53); Bucharest, Socialist Republic of Romania
- Education: Bucharest National University of Arts
- Known for: painting, graphic art, poet
- Movement: post-modernist
- Spouse: Georgeta Năpăruș
- Awards: Ion Andreescu Prize of the Romanian Academy (1966); Ordine al merito della Repubblica Italiana (1983)
- Website: igrigore3.wixsite.com/octav-grigorescu

Octav Grigorescu was a Romanian painter, graphic artist, book illustrator, fine arts professor at the Bucharest National University of Arts (at the time Institul de Arte Plastice "N. Grigorescu"), an important figure in Romanian art. He was the brother of Ion Grigorescu and the husband of the painter Georgeta Năpăruș.

== Early life ==
Octav Grigorescu was born on May 22, 1933, to Anastase Grigorescu (b. 1905) and Maria (b. 1906, née Gușerescu), the second among four brothers and one sister. His father, a chemical engineer, had weak eyesight due to an early accident when experimenting with chemicals as a boy. This, together with the number of children of young age, prevented him from being drafted during the war. The family story lets believe that Anastase met Maria when his brother was a law trainee in Octav Guserescu's office (her father). This is where the boy's name comes from. In spite of initially opposing the marriage, the elder Octav went along with what appeared to be a true love story, and the family settled and raised all children in his house located in part of the old town, on Vasile Alecsandri street, which still owned in part by the family. Anastase Grigorescu's family hails from Bengești-Ciocadia, Gorj County, in the province of Oltenia, from a family of landowners who ran a mill on the Ciocadia River. They rose to a degree a local prominence to build a small church in town and sending all children to the university. The economic fate of the family had a downturn before and during the war, so they avoided the immediate bull's eye of the communist revolution, which waged a fierce war on the well-endowed peasantry and so called small bourgeoisie during the initial stages of the Soviet imposed rule.

Anastase's mother side was of Aromanian origin, having settled from south of the Danube in the province via Turnu Severin, and owning a property at Strehaia in the township of Corcova, Mehedinți County. The father's side were local with possible roots over the Carpathians in Transylvania.

On the mother's side, Guserescu was from northern Bukovina, born in Todirești, Botoșani County, in a family of free land-owning peasants (răzeși) who boasted having been granted land by the legendary medieval King of Moldavia, Stephen the Great, after an ancestor earned it in battle. In any case, later on, the artist remembered his grandfather as a dominating, boastful character, with a penchant for bad financial deals and infidelity toward his wife who was an artistic, delicate and inspiring character to the children. Herself addicted to gambling, but very well read and educated, with a passion for romantic novels and a whiff of elegance, coming from a wealthier merchant family with mixed Greek ancestry, she was the favorite of the rest of the family who gradually set the older Octav Guserescu in a sort of domestic exile. Her daughter, Maria, the painter's mother, was not in good terms with her own father. The unconventional, cigar smoking grandfather exerted a "bad boy" attraction on the grandchildren during Octav's middle school years. He let his grandson puff cigarettes a tad too early, a habit that the future painter unfortunately never quit and most likely contributed to his early death at 53. During the short famine following the war and an exceptionally cold winter, the family burned some of the law school volumes, out of need but perhaps in an act of defiance as well. The lawyer had died in 1945.

Octav, together with his brothers, attended what was a boy's only top school, starting with what was at that time the maternal school no. 18, followed in the same building by the Titu Maiorescu High School. He graduated with a baccalaureate in 1951. In some sense the school was a higher education institution, with an elite of very talented pupils with accomplished future careers; social position played a role, but the group was apparently mixed, with children belonging to the royal court intermingled with the middle class. The communist revolution altered this mix, but did not destroy the outstanding quality of the school. His literature teacher was an accomplished, even though traditionalist poet, with interest in art and who encouraged his students to pursue higher grounds. Octav was talented in art, starting to draw endlessly by copying museum postcards, browsing black and white art and travel albums with monuments and renaissance sculptures, found in the house, borrowed from friends or from school. One has to remember that he was fourteen in 1947, a fateful moment for the country, when the king abdicated and the immediate years after the war were marked by severe political upheaval and economic shortages. Yet he disclosed thinking that philosophy was his calling, perhaps due to the stimulating classes of his teachers. All along, a natural interest in literature, especially poetry, was present, and he continued writing all his life, even though he never published his work during his lifetime. The only published poetry volume is Lotofagii, a posthumous artist book printed in a font inspired by his distinctive, Da Vinci - like handwriting, edited by his brother Ion Grigorescu.

Entering the fine arts school in the class of Rudolf Schweitzer-Cumpăna at the Institute, following up with sculpture in Dimitrie Onofrei's class, he finally chooses to specialize in graphic arts with Vasile Kazar. He graduates his M.A. (1958) with a diploma project depicting scenes from the lives of workers from the coal works in Maramures county, as required by the times. He is happy to accept, right upon graduation, being a lecturer in the graphic arts section. Later on he becomes a reader (conferentiar) and keeps his position till the end, in a distinguished career, many students, with a short interruption around 1968–1971.

== The sixties ==
His solo debut is in 1959, entering the Artists' Guild (Uniunea Artiștilor Plastici) in 1961; he even served at some point on the steering committee, and was a member until the end. In 1965 he married hir former college fellow and painter Georgeta Năpăruș, and they had a son in 1967.

Between 1955-1984 he traveled extensively, both independently and with support for scholarly activity, for art shows and exhibitions, at the beginning primarily in Eastern Europe: Czechoslovakia, Hungary, Poland, Bulgaria, German Democratic Republic (1962, 1965, 1974); but later on to Italy, France, Austria (1968, 1969–70, 1977, 1978, 1980); and again U.S.S. R. (1972); Cuba, Spain (1979); Franta, United Kingdom, Greece (1983).

It is in 1968 that he is representing Romania at the Venice Biennale for the first time (the second is in 1980), a turning point in his career. He is noticed by critics and is invited to have a solo exhibition. Back and forth between home and Italy, some of the excitement of his initial success is tempered by the unkind practices of gallerists who confiscate all his work, claiming it is normal to compensate for expenses. It is not clear if he was duped or simply naively misunderstanding the brutal realities of the art trade, being raised in the sterilized vacuum of a country, let's say, without a market economy. He decides to fight, prove himself and at the same time pursue a deep love for Italy, which he regarded as the land of art, an object of desire for the child who used to train his hand sketching postcards from Rome and the Uffizi.

== The seventies - after the Biennale ==
The Italian period is marked by extreme creativity and productivity. He settles in Venice for most of the time, but travels to Milan, to Bologna (with shows), Rome and several back and forth ventures to Vienna, a city he liked deeply (Rielke was a leitmotif of his sensibility, and an early German literature and fair knowledge of the language helped), has some longer interludes in Paris, where he meets some old friends, but does not seem to adhere to any place. Possibly the most fateful decision of his career came on the New Year's Eve of 1971 when he lands in Bucharest, with an expired passport, at a time when the regime was considering overstaying an exit visa (in this case by years) simply a crime. A stash of letters to his wife, explaining in part some of his torments in Venice, is lost, and what seems to sum up events is that he might not have felt able to support his new family (his only child was born in 1967) in Italy and his wife, Georgeta, was increasingly feeling under pressure to ask him to return, both because of the authorities which perceived his defection as suspect, harassing her, and her own insecurities.

Disillusionment with the art practices he was exposed to is soon replaced by losing his job at the art institute, where he was demoted to a pay by the hour status, a condition that even though he later overcame delayed his promotion to full professorship. Due to his death at 53, it never happened. In some other sense, he had time to work and the few next years had the consolation of a certain calm of family life. Gradually he re-integrates in the artistic community and tends to work in many directions: etching, drawing, watercolor, book illustration; painting and of course teaching, where he gets attracted by technical explorations, e.g. preparing compounds, foundations and canvasses from scratch using ancient trade books. The paintings become much larger than before, he talks about the dream of painting alfresco vast surfaces in the outdoors. This never happens but he experiments a lot, to the point that he feared occasionally that his works may be vulnerable in time.

Marking the signal of retrenchment to a rigid form of socialism, 1973 brings also a term to the artist's hope that the liberalization seen after 1965 will lead to an end of the regime. The only difference is that a brutal ideology is now serving a personal dictatorship. The major earthquake of 1977 (March 4) moves the political climate another notch to the extreme. The eighties were also a cultural agony, to say the least. It is not that his career was not moving forward; in 1980 he is representing Romania in the National Pavilion at the Venice Biennale, for the second time. In a relaxation with the Italian government, it is deemed acceptable by the authorities that he accepts the Order of Cavaliere della Repubblica Italiana, which was an appreciated honor, but somehow came as a belated consolation for his older adventures. It must be said that on his death bed he took with him to the hospital a thick book of short stories by Alberto Moravia, in a testament to his deeply felt affinity with that experience.

== The eighties ==
In a deteriorating political climate, it is a chance encounter that sets the ground for a consequential and lasting relationship with a businessman from Hamburg, Ernst Michael Winter, who had asked to see an artist studio. Possibly due to the coincidence of names between the classical painter N. Grigorescu and himself (as the joke goes), or rather because Octav's brother, Constantin, worked as an engineer at the firm the Germans were selling equipment to, the visit was a true meeting of the minds, or artistic sensibilities. In fact, soon after, Mr. Winter dedicated himself to art opening a gallery. Two exhibitions in Hamburg, the third scheduled but stopped by the artist's death, followed, a relationship of trust and long standing support ensued. This success brought various forms of harassment from the government. The unbearable last years of the regime, doubled by the offensive cult of personality, pushed the painter one more time to seek exile. It is not clear, but his physical health may have contributed to giving up staying in Paris, as he had planned, in the summer of 1985. By next fall, he walked the last time home from his studio, and died after a short but painful struggle with cancer at the Elias Hospital in Bucharest, on a day of February 1987 when the snow storm had brought the city to a standstill.

Winter recognized a certain stature in the pale, figurative paintings Grigorescu had in his studio, with mythological subjects, inspired by ancient accounts in Herodotus, Biblical and Hellenistic fables. Octav Grigorescu loved the sea, spent long hours strolling the rocky, narrow beach hoping to find ancient bits of history among the seashells, going to the beach with a copy of the Histories of Herodotus, highly annotated or maybe Anna Komnene's Alexiad which he treated as an inspiring "grazing" material. In the raw landscape, unusually dry fields of Dobruja, bordering the unglamorous Black Sea, were mysterious mounds said to shelter tombs of Scythian warriors. All this was inciting, and he would have spent many months during the summer break dreaming about a legendary past; as the last advance of Darius, had to stop his march at the Danube after the locals sent him three omens he could not bear - this is Herodotus, and he painted it.

A bookish nature, refuge from political reality, maybe even the illusion of reaching a compromise with the demands of the official ideology that seemed to excuse estheticism as long as it would not challenge the dogma of one man rule, an almost nostalgic reach to Christianity, not as dogma, but as a cultural guarantor, led him to this stage of his work where large paintings depict in evanescent colors mythological scenes loaded with ciphers and metaphors. Embedded in the historicizing orbit was the recurring depiction of king Brâncoveanu's sacrifice, the founder of Romanian renaissance, the last king of an ancient dynasty, who was killed in Istanbul by forcing him to witness the beheadings of all his sons, who would have been spared, had they forsaken their Christian faith; including the youngest, whom he advises to choose death instead of submission. The event, in 1714, exposes a pivotal moment, looking almost against the course of history, a cusp between the Middle Ages and modernity, perhaps even for the Ottoman Empire. After that, even though nominally under the High Porte, the Romanian principalities are essentially carving independence after an episode of Russian tutelage, and politically, certainly culturally, enter under French and to a lesser extent, German influence. Turkish interference is seen with relaxation today in Romania, and the story was rather perceived as nostalgic for a better moral condition of the country. Brâncoveanu is the last good king, the path we did not have the chance to follow, the art loving prince, and above all, legitimate. In 1980, an illegitimate troglodyte was slowly destroying the country, who, adding insult to his ineptitude, demolished may churches to build a nondescript neo-classical/brutalist mix of government buildings that scar the capital's urban planning ambitions even today. The theme of illegitimacy concerning the communist regime is an active area of discussion. The artist shared the view that was its main failure. It was also fatal, as we now understand, but he died two years short of having the proof.

== Book illustration ==
In some sense a minor side of his activity, book illustration was a core activity nonetheless. It was intimately related to literature; even in the few children's books there was purpose: to the extent that The Happy Prince was meant for children, it is the most recognizable work of his, and there are younger artists who learned about him from this book. Grigorescu took the process very seriously, and combining with his didactical work, it was the most public, in a wider sense, endeavor and at the heart of a graphic artist's raison d'etre. It was time-consuming but certainly developing the imaginary of larger works. It may be unusual for a modern artist, but he was indeed an intellectual, in that he needed a circular flow between fantasy and intellect, and the link was usually a book. Rilke's writings were perfectly fitting his taste, imbued with melancholy and a certain masculine vulnerability. Many children's books were natural choices also because he spoke German, French, and later on Italian and to a lesser extent English (a man of another century, in that), confessing that Russian, although assimilated during school in the fifties, remained rudimentary.

== Solo exhibitions - selection ==
- 1967 Expoziție Octav Grigorescu, Galeria Galateea, București
- 1969 Expoziție Octav Grigorescu, Galeria Laminima, Torino, Italia
- 1969 Expoziție Octav Grigorescu, Galeria Ravagnan si Galeria d’ Arte, Veneția, Italia
- 1970 Expoziție Octav Grigorescu, Galeria Trinita, Roma, Italia;
- 1970 Expoziție Octav Grigorescu, Galeria Sagittario, Milano;
- 1970 Expoziție Octav Grigorescu, Galeria d’Arte Forni, Bologna, Italia
- 1971 Expoziție Octav Grigorescu, Galeria La Chiocciola, Padova Italia
- 1971 Expoziție Octav Grigorescu, Galeria Apollo, Bucuresti
- 1972 Expoziție Octav Grigorescu, Sala Dalles, Bucuresti
- 1972 Expoziție de Grafică Octav Grigorescu - Constantin Piliuță", Muzeul de Artă Ploiești,
- 1974 Expoziție Octav Grigorescu și Vasile Kazar, Galeria Galateea, București
- 1976 Expoziție Octav Grigorescu, pictură si grafică, Galeria Amfora București
- 1977 Expoziție Octav Grigorescu (Zilele culturii românesti) Dortmundt, Germania
- 1984 Expoziție Octav Grigorescu, pictură și grafică, Muzeul Național de Artă al Republicii Socialiste România;
- 1984 Expozitie Octav Grigorescu, pictură si grafica, Galeria Ernst Michael Winter, Hamburg

== Solo exhibitions in Romania ==
- 1960 Expoziția anuală de Grafică, Muzeul Național de Artă al Republicii Socialiste România;
- 1963 Expoziția anuală de Grafică București, Muzeul Național de Artă al Republicii Socialiste România;
- 1973 Artistul contemporan și universul său, Muzeul de Artă Galați;
- 1974 Aspecte ale desenului românesc contemporan, Muzeul Național de Artă al Republicii Socialiste România;
- 1978 Expoziția Pontica '78 pictură grafică, Galeriile de Artă U. A. P. Constanța.

== Group exhibitions - selection ==
- 1965 Bienala Internațională a tineretului de la Paris
- 1965 Expoziția Non-abstractă de la Tokyo
- 1965 Expoziția Internațională de Artă Contemporană, New Delhi, Paris, Tokio, Leipzing
- 1966 Simpozione Interazionale di bianco e near, Lugano
- 1967 Expoziția Internațională de Artă Intergraphik, Berlin
- 1968 Venice Biennal, Romanian Pavilion
- 1968 Junge Rumänische Künstler, Frankfurt
- 1969 Artisti Romeni - Grafica uno, Verona, Italia
- 1969 Festivalul Internațional de pictură de la Cagnes-sur-Mer
- 1971 Festivalul Internațional de pictură de la Edinburgh
- 1972 8 Peintres Roumains, Panorama Mesdaag, Fondation Roumanie Ioan et Maria Constantinescu, The Hague
- 1980 Venice Biennale, Romanian Pavilion
- 1983 Bienala Europeană de gravură, Baden-Baden

== Retrospective shows ==
- 1990 Retrospective exhibition Octav Grigorescu, curator Ileana Pintilie Teleagă
- 1996 Retrospective exhibition Acquarelle-drawing-painting, Ernst Michael Winter Gallerie, Hamburg
- 2006 Launch of the book "Lotofagii", Retrospectivă Octav Grigorescu, Mogoșoaia Palace.
- 2008 Vignettes from the sixties and seventies, Veroniki Art Gallery, București
- 2010 Octav Grigorescu "Distructor", Andreiana Mihail Gallery, Bucharest, curator Ion Grigorescu

== Awards - selection ==
- 1966 Ion Andreescu prize of the Romanian Academy
- 1968 The Cultural Merit Class III of the Romanian Socialist Republic
- 1969 Grand Prize of the Romanina Artists' Guild
- 1983 Cavaliere al merito della Repubblica Italiana

== Book illustration - selection ==
- Rainer Maria Rilke, Versuri (Verses) Editura Pentru Literatura Universala, 1966,
- Emil Giurgiuca Cântece de țară, (Country songs), Ed. Tineretului, București, 1967
- Abatele Prevost (L'Abbe Prevost, translated in Romanian), by Manon Lescaut, Editura Univers, 1972
- Dumitru Popescu Gustul sâmburelui (The taste of the kernel) Editura Eminescu, București, 1974;
- Alfred Margul Sperber Men liebetes Buch (in German), Editura Ion Creanga, București 1977
- Rainer Maria Rilke, Scrisori catre un tanar poet (Letters to a Young Poet), Editura Facla, București 1977
- Gerard de Nerval, Poezii (Poems), Ed. Univers 1979
- Nikolaus Schmidt, Die im Wind (in German), Ed. Ion Creanga, 1981
- Oscar Wilde, Prințul fericit - și alte povestiri (The Happy Prince - and Other Stories), Editura Ion Creangă, 1982
- Iannis Ritsos, Întoarcerea atrizilor (The return of the Atrides), Editura Univers, București, 1983
- Fanus Neagu, Caii albi din orasul București (The White Horses of the City of Bucharest), Editura Creangă, București 1980
- Ion Vlasiu, Copil fermecat (Enchanted Child), Editura Ion Creangă, București, 1984

== Published books ==
- 2006 Lotofagii - edited by the Cultural Centre of the Mogosoaia Palace Complex. Edited by the artist Ion Grigorescu, Octav's youngest brother.

== Critical reviews ==
=== On the book Lotofagii ===
Lotofagii by Octav Grigorescu: " In the personality and art of Octav Grigorescu met the typically avantgarde of the beginnings and the culture of the elementary with a taste for the crepuscular delicacies and the premonition of death and postmodernism."

A posthumous volume of poems, Lotofagii, by the painter and graphic artist Octav Grigorescu, which ends with an autobiographical text, published recently, edited by the Cultural Centre of the Mogosoaia Palace and edited by his brother, Ion Grigorescu.

Born in 1933, died in 1987, Octav Grigorescu had at his disposal no more than 54 years to leave a unique work. He worked enormously. Draftsman, graphical artist, and painter, his oeuvre is much more vast than what became public along the years with the occasion of various exhibitions. Hundreds of drawings, starting with adolescence and college years lasting until his last years of life, are not yet known to the public. A small part accompanies the poem volume.

The complicity between writing and drawing in the case of Octav Grigorescu is pushed very far. Writing and drawing maintain a complex relationship, spanning several intermingling levels. Sometimes annotations accompany the drawings without any meaning relation among them. There are ideas born in parallel with signs. Their connection is random, at least seemingly so. Some other times writing is speculated only as grapheme, as purely ornamental essence. In the case of book illustrations subtle transfers occur, genuine illuminations of the text through image, if we recall the etymology of the concept of illustration. His historically and Biblical themed painting is also a relation to text, and at the most strict level of technique, the drawn and painted images are true palimpsests and not just their illusion. The publication of his poems opens up a new chapter of this relation that remains to be investigated.

In the person and art of Octav Grigorescu met the typically avantgarde of the beginnings and the culture of the elementary with a taste for the crepuscular delicacies and the premonition of death and postmodernism. He regards with suspicion the so-called triumphs of the modernism and seeks remedies to the impoverishment of the image issued from the sequence of iconoclastic moves of the 19th and 20th centuries. The regenerating solutions are the acceptance of time and the memory intertwined with forgetfulness. In his remarks I found this note, a prayer: " God, give me the strength to live in the world of my dreams". The Lotophages, encountered by Ulysses in his travels, discover the mirage of forgetfulness. Poetry is for Octav Grigorescu a strategy of forgetfulness and immersion in the dream, as part of the "integral realism" he was aspiring to - the recapture of the fullness of the world and the escape from the fascinating spell of "the fragment".Ioana Vlasiu

=== Retrospective at Mogosoaia palace, 2006 ===
History as dream in Octav Grigorescu's painting: (...) In a fairly short time span of approximately a decade, from the mid-seventies to his dismissal in 1987, Octav Grigorescu paints a remarkable number of vast compositions, of large size, among which I mention the sequence of eight paintings dedicated to Brancovenau, Arderea Arhondologiei la 1848 (The burning of the Chronicle at 1848), The Echo (1907), The letter from the Scythes to Darius. Other paintings like the Peace Allegory and The Allegory of the War and the Good Peace or The Symbolic Burial, even though not making direct reference to a certain historical event, are through their substance, glossing interpreting historical themes. In parallel with history, Octav Grigorescu rediscovers the Biblical thematic, but on the side of both appear very elaborate compositions, with many characters, with a complicated symbolism in which many scholarly sources merge. Doina Mândru

=== Exhibition in Venice, 1969 ===
Art critic Giuseppe Marchiori described Grigorescu's work as focusing on themes of memory, introspection, and personal expression. He interpreted the paintings as reflecting the artist's individual perspective and artistic approach.

=== Olga Busneag, 1985 ===
(...) Octav Grigorescu - one of the fundamental artists of the middle generation. Olga Bușneag

=== Ion Frunzetti, on work in the seventies ===
"Octav Grigorescu introduces the morphology of reality in fantastical syntaxes. His imagination reaches the far end sections of the conscience projecting outwards a passionate, phantasm rich universe, meant to cover the real one and occult it to us, in grasping fashion. He is a poet with great graphical skill, a seducingly engaged poet through his mere subjective excesses. His undivided character between cerebral and affective urges him, through unmitigated prodding, to find, in a symbolic language, spontaneously, its translation." - Ion Frunzetti.

== Bibliography ==
- Octav Grigorescu, Pictura contemporana românească, author Ion Frunzetti, Editura Meridiane, 1974
- Octav Grigorescu - Dicționarul artiștilor plastici contemporani de Octavian Barbosa Ed. Meridiane, 1976
- Ion Frunzetti, Octav Grigorescu, în Enciclopedia Universale SEDA della Pittura Moderna, vol. al 3lea, F-L, pag. 1323-1324
- Giuseppe Marchiori, Octav Grigorescu, dal mio diario, prezentare în prefața catalogului expoziției din Galeria „Venezia-Ravagnan", 1969
- "Catalogul Expoziției de Grafică Octav Grigorescu - Constantin Piliuță", Muzeul de Artă Ploiești, 1972
- Octav Grigorescu, Dicționar de Artă Modernă și Contemporană p. 177, de Constantin Prut, Editura Albatros
- Coşoveanu, Dorana, Album "Octav Grigorescu", Ed. Meridiane, 1985
- Catalogul Expoziției retrospective Acuarela-desen-pictura, Galeria Ernst Michael Winter, Hamburg, 1996
- "Octav Grigorescu - Lotofagii", text de Ioana Vlasiu, Editura Centrul de Cultură Palatele Brâncovenești, 2006
- Octav Grigorescu, Catalogul Expozitiei Secvente anii '60-'70, Galeria Veroniki Art, Bucuresti, 2008
- Ioana Vlasiu, Reflecții asupra limbajului plastic în desenul lui Octav Grigorescu, în Studii și cercetări de istoria artei, tom 23, 1976
- Crişan, Maria Magdalena," Remember Octav Grigorescu 1933-1987" în "Observator Cultural", nr. 530 din 2006
