= Darida =

Darida is a surname. Notable people with the surname include:

- Alexandru Darida (born 1955), American painter
- Clelio Darida (1927–2017), Italian politician
- Vladimír Darida (born 1990), Czech footballer

== See also ==
- FC Darida Minsk Raion, a defunct Belarusian football club
