= Preda (disambiguation) =

Preda is a locality in Graubünden, Switzerland.

Preda may also refer to:

- Preda railway station, a Rhaetian Railway station in Preda, Switzerland
- PREDA Foundation, a charitable organization based in the Philippines

== People ==
=== Surname ===
- Ambrogio Preda (1839–1906), Italian painter
- Andreea Preda (born 2006), Romanian artistic gymnast
- Cristian Preda (born 1966), Romanian professor and politician
- Danny Preda (born 1987), Israeli footballer
- Luca Preda (born 2006), Romanian tennis player
- Mariana Preda (born 1994), Romanian pan flute musician
- Marin Preda (1922–1980), Romanian novelist
- Roberto Preda (1878–1962), Italian sports shooter
- Savo Pređa (1921–2005), Serbian Partisan general in World War II
- Ştefan Preda (born 1970), Romanian footballer
- Terezia Preda (born 1956), Romanian archer
- Valentin Preda (born 1985), Romanian swimmer
- Virgil Preda (1923–2011), Romanian painter

=== Given name ===
- Preda Mihăilescu (born 1955), Romanian mathematician
