= Pancu =

Pancu is a Romanian surname. Notable people with the surname include:

- Daniel Pancu (born 1977), Romanian footballer
- Lili Pancu (1908–2006), Romanian painter
- Octav Pancu-Iași (1929–1975), Romanian novelist
