= Comarnic =

- Town
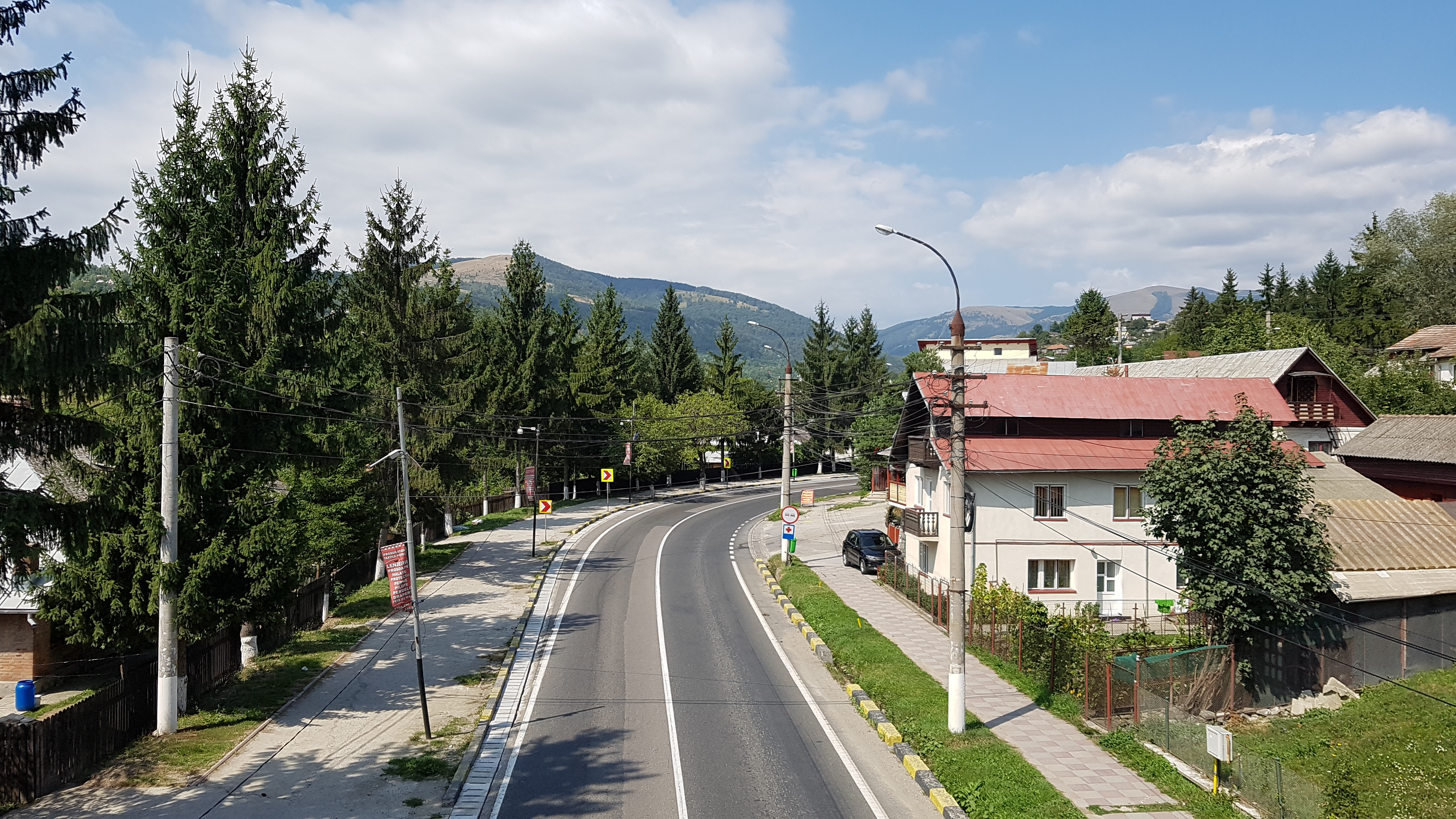
- DN1 passing through Comarnic

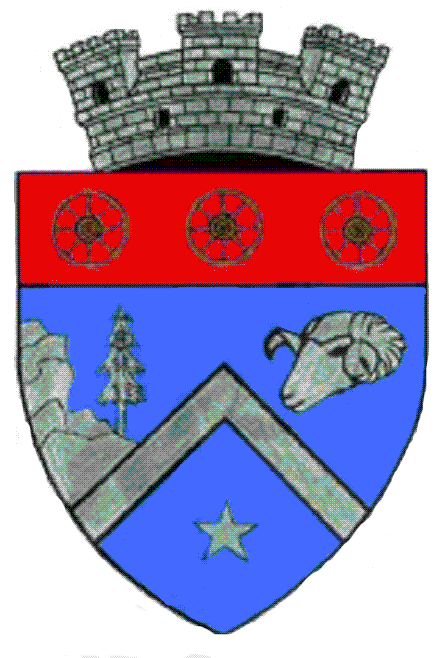
- Coat of arms

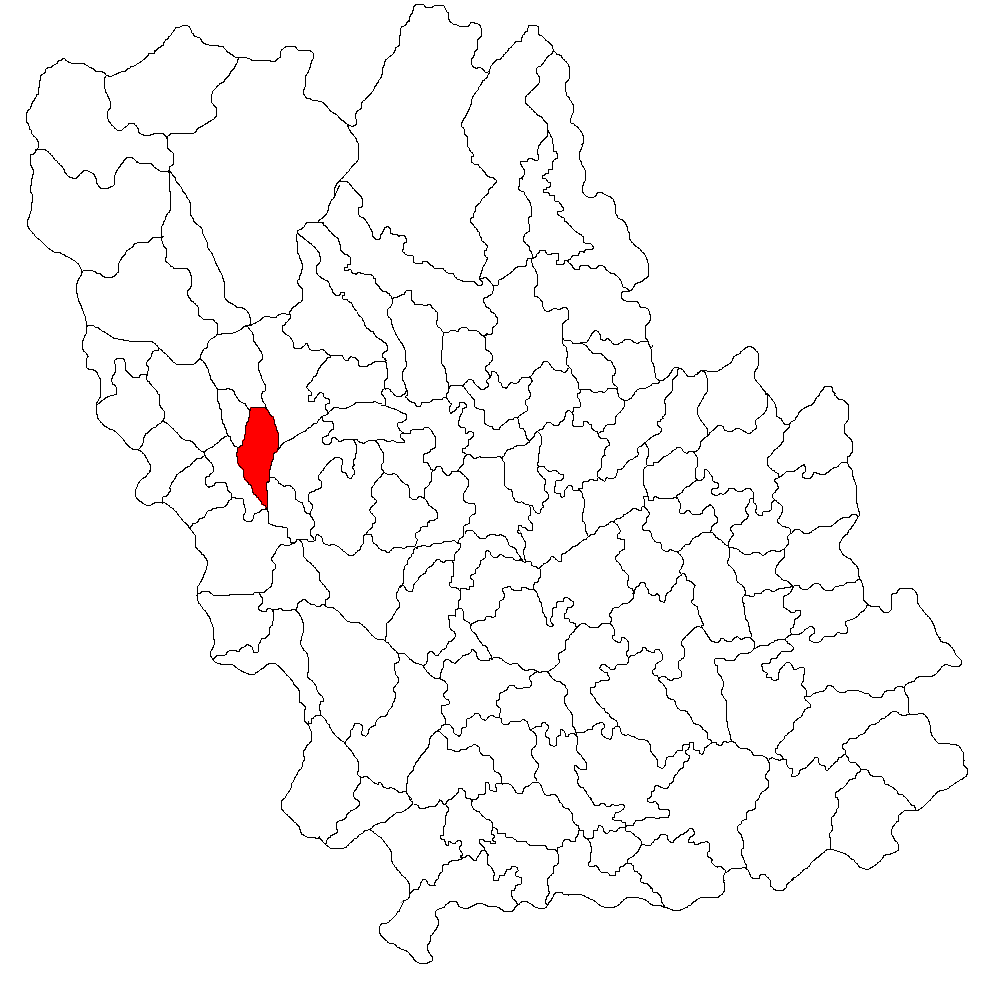
- Location in Prahova County

- Location in Romania
- Coordinates: 45°15′4″N 25°38′7″E
- Country: Romania
- County: Prahova

Government
  - Mayor (2024–2028): Sorin Popa (PNL)
- Area: 89.97 km^{2} (34.74 sq mi)
- Elevation: 555 m (1,821 ft)
- Population (2021-12-01): 11,106
  - Density: 123.4/km^{2} (319.7/sq mi)
- Time zone: UTC+02:00 (EET)
  - Summer (DST): UTC+03:00 (EEST)
- Postal code: 105700
- Area code: (+40) 02 44
- Vehicle reg.: PH
- Website: primariacomarnic.ro

Comarnic (Romanian pronunciation: [koˈmarnik]) is a town in Prahova County, Muntenia, Romania, with a population of 11,106 as of 2021. Four villages are administered by the town: Ghioșești, Podu Lung, Poiana, and Posada.

== Geography ==
The town is situated in the southern foothills of the Carpathian Mountains, close to the interface between the Southern Carpathians and the Eastern Carpathians, at an altitude of 555 m (1,821 ft). It lies towards the southern end of the Prahova Valley, along the Prahova River, in the main on the left bank, but with some of the component villages on the right bank of the river.

Comarnic is located in the western part of Prahova County, 49 km (30 mi) northwest of the county seat, Ploiești. It is crossed by national road DN1 (part of European route E60), which starts in Bucharest and goes north towards Brașov and on to the border with Hungary near Oradea; the partially built A3 motorway will also go through the town. The Comarnic train station and the Posada halt serve the CFR Main Line 300, which runs parallel to DN1.

Historical population
Year	Pop.	±%
1977	13,703	—
1992	13,762	+0.4%
2002	13,532	−1.7%
2011	11,732	−13.3%
2021	11,106	−5.3%
Source: Census data

== Etymology ==
Its name origin is the Romanian word "comarnic" for a kind of a shepherd's hut, of Slavic origin: komar=mosquito+ -nik, literally, "retreat from mosquitoes". It is used for milking sheep and storing milk and other dairy products.

== Natives ==
- Corina Drăgan-Terecoasa (born 1971), luger
- Constantin Dragomir (born 1927), bobsledder
- Georgeta Năpăruș (1930–1997), painter
- Ion Panțuru (1934–2016), bobsledder
- David Popescu (1886–1955), general in World War II and Interior Minister

== Climate ==
Comarnic has a humid continental climate (Cfb in the Köppen climate classification).

Climate data for Comarnic
Month	Jan	Feb	Mar	Apr	May	Jun	Jul	Aug	Sep	Oct	Nov	Dec	Year
Mean daily maximum °C (°F)	1.7 (35.1)	3.6 (38.5)	8.1 (46.6)	13.7 (56.7)	18.4 (65.1)	21.9 (71.4)	24 (75)	24.1 (75.4)	19.1 (66.4)	13.5 (56.3)	8.2 (46.8)	3.4 (38.1)	13.3 (55.9)
Daily mean °C (°F)	−2.6 (27.3)	−0.9 (30.4)	3.2 (37.8)	8.9 (48.0)	14 (57)	17.7 (63.9)	19.6 (67.3)	19.5 (67.1)	14.7 (58.5)	9 (48)	4.2 (39.6)	−0.7 (30.7)	8.9 (48.0)
Mean daily minimum °C (°F)	−6.2 (20.8)	−4.9 (23.2)	−1.5 (29.3)	3.6 (38.5)	8.7 (47.7)	12.6 (54.7)	14.6 (58.3)	14.6 (58.3)	10.2 (50.4)	5.1 (41.2)	1.1 (34.0)	−3.9 (25.0)	4.5 (40.1)
Average precipitation mm (inches)	46 (1.8)	46 (1.8)	63 (2.5)	96 (3.8)	147 (5.8)	159 (6.3)	154 (6.1)	118 (4.6)	77 (3.0)	66 (2.6)	57 (2.2)	55 (2.2)	1,084 (42.7)
Source: https://en.climate-data.org/europe/romania/prahova/comarnic-12800/

== Sister cities ==
Cormarnic has one sister city:

- Anacortes, Washington, United States
