= Marin Georgescu =

Romanian Post-Impressionist painter

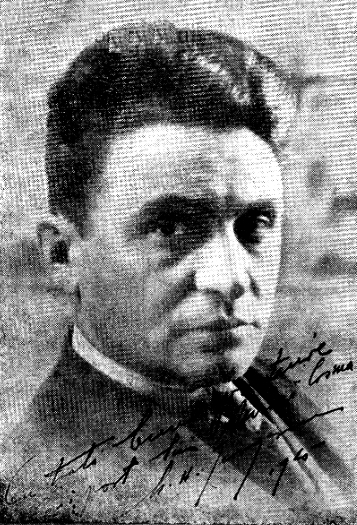
Marin Georgescu (c.1925)

Marin Haralambie Georgescu, sometimes known as Mehașgeorgescu (30 September 1892, Bucharest - 4 August 1932, Bucharest) was a Romanian Post-Impressionist painter; primarily of landscapes and buildings. Some sources give his year of birth as 1886, although this seems too early in light of his school attendance dates.

== Biography ==
His father was a clerk for the Police Department. After graduating from the "Liceul Mihai Viteazul" (Lyceum of Michael the Brave) in 1912, he attended the Bucharest National University of Arts. The following year, he went to Paris where he took courses in painting, sculpture and architecture at the École des Beaux-arts.

While there, he exhibited at the Salon and came under the influence of the Barbizon school, which gave him a lifelong preference for painting en plein aire. Later, he visited Italy and Switzerland, which so impressed him that he considered remaining there.

In 1920, he gave his first showing at the Salon of the "Tinerimea artistică" (Artistic Youth), which included such prominent names as Ștefan Luchian, Nicolae Vermont, Frederic Storck and Gheorghe Petrașcu. All of his canvases there were purchased by King Ferdinand I. This was followed by a successful solo exhibits in 1920, 1923 and 1926.

With the money obtained from those exhibits, he opened his own "Academy of Arts" in 1930, inspired by the work of Theodor Aman, who had helped establish the National University of Arts. Before his school became well-established, however, he died of unspecified causes at the early age of forty.

== Selected works ==
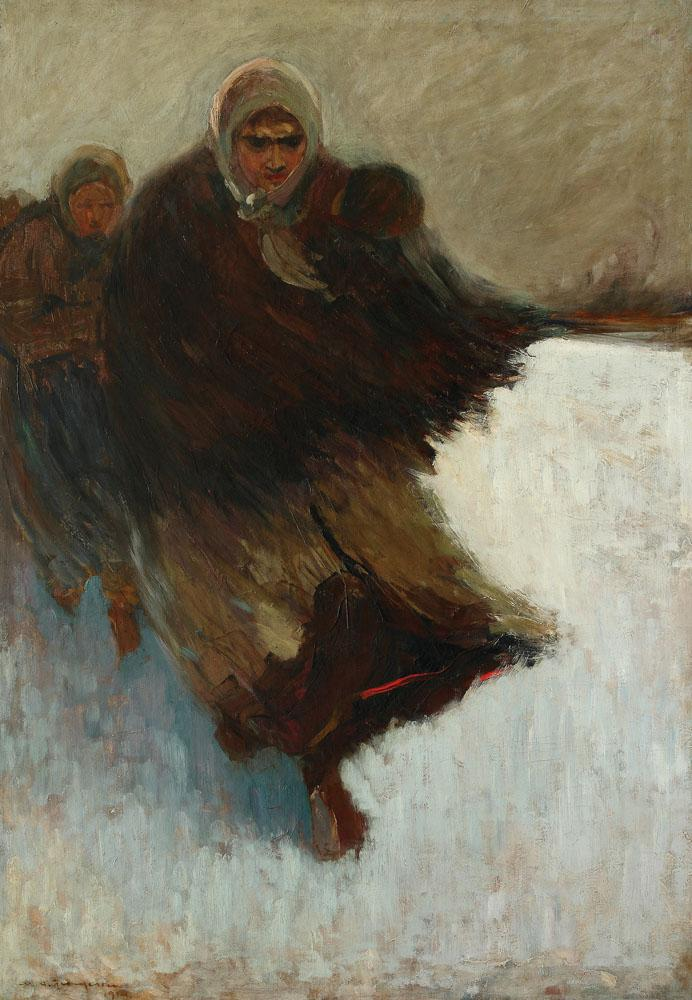
Refugees

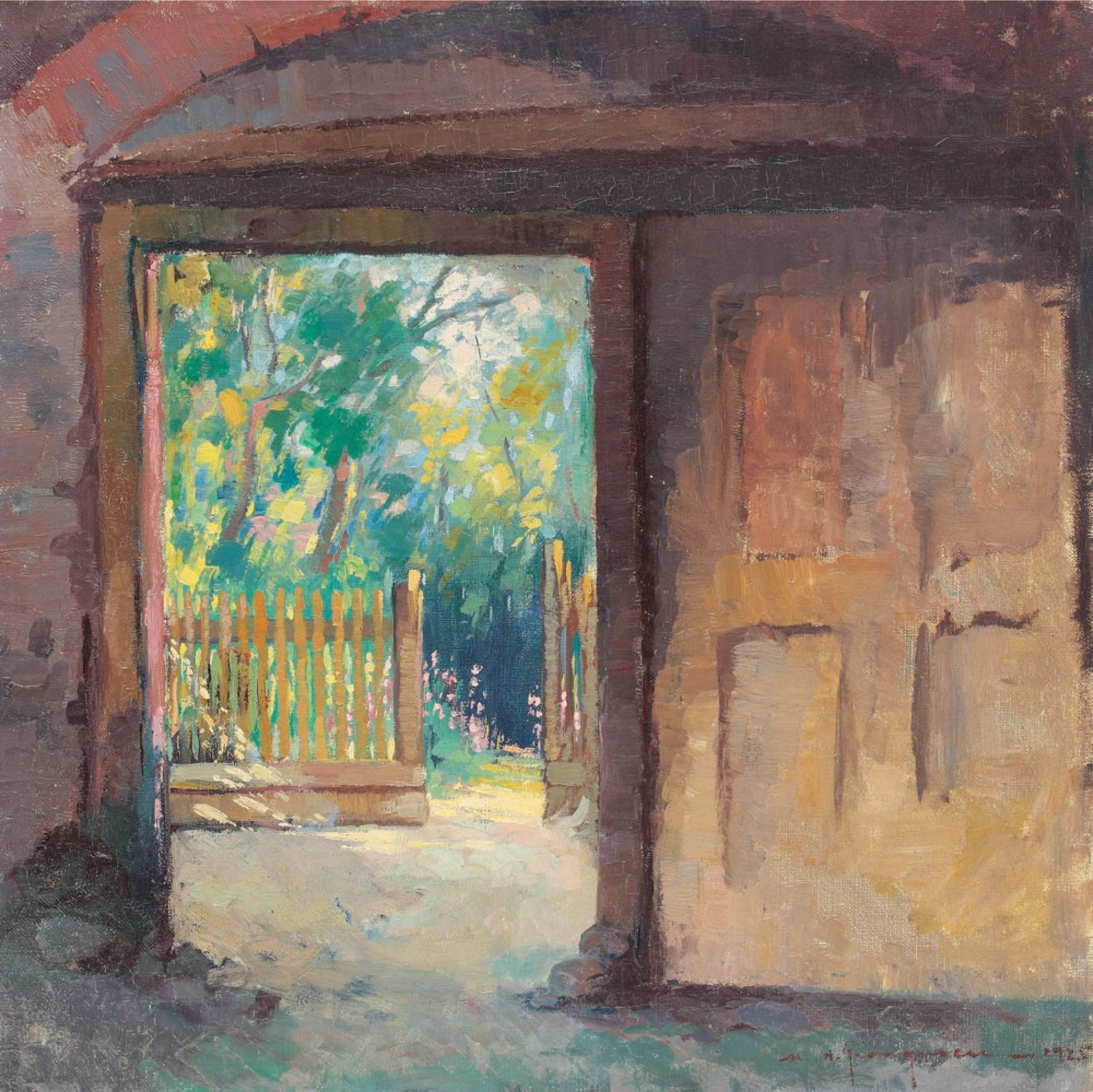
View of the Garden

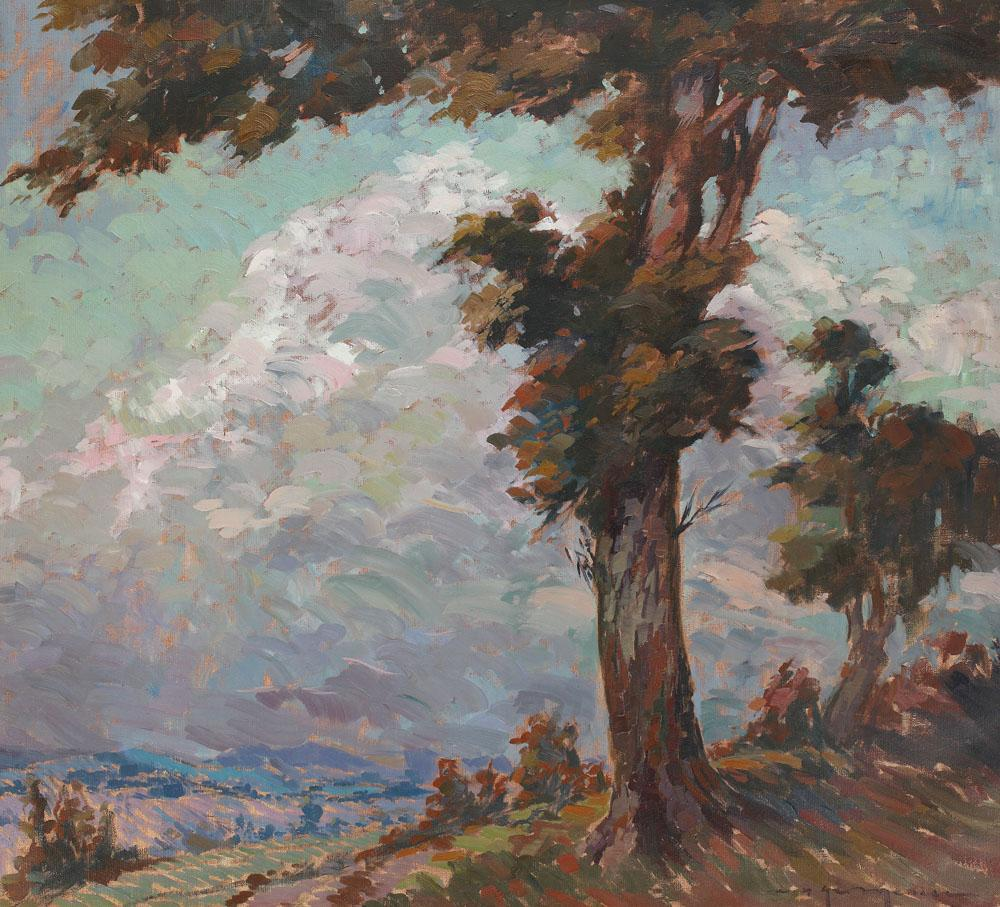
View from Gorun

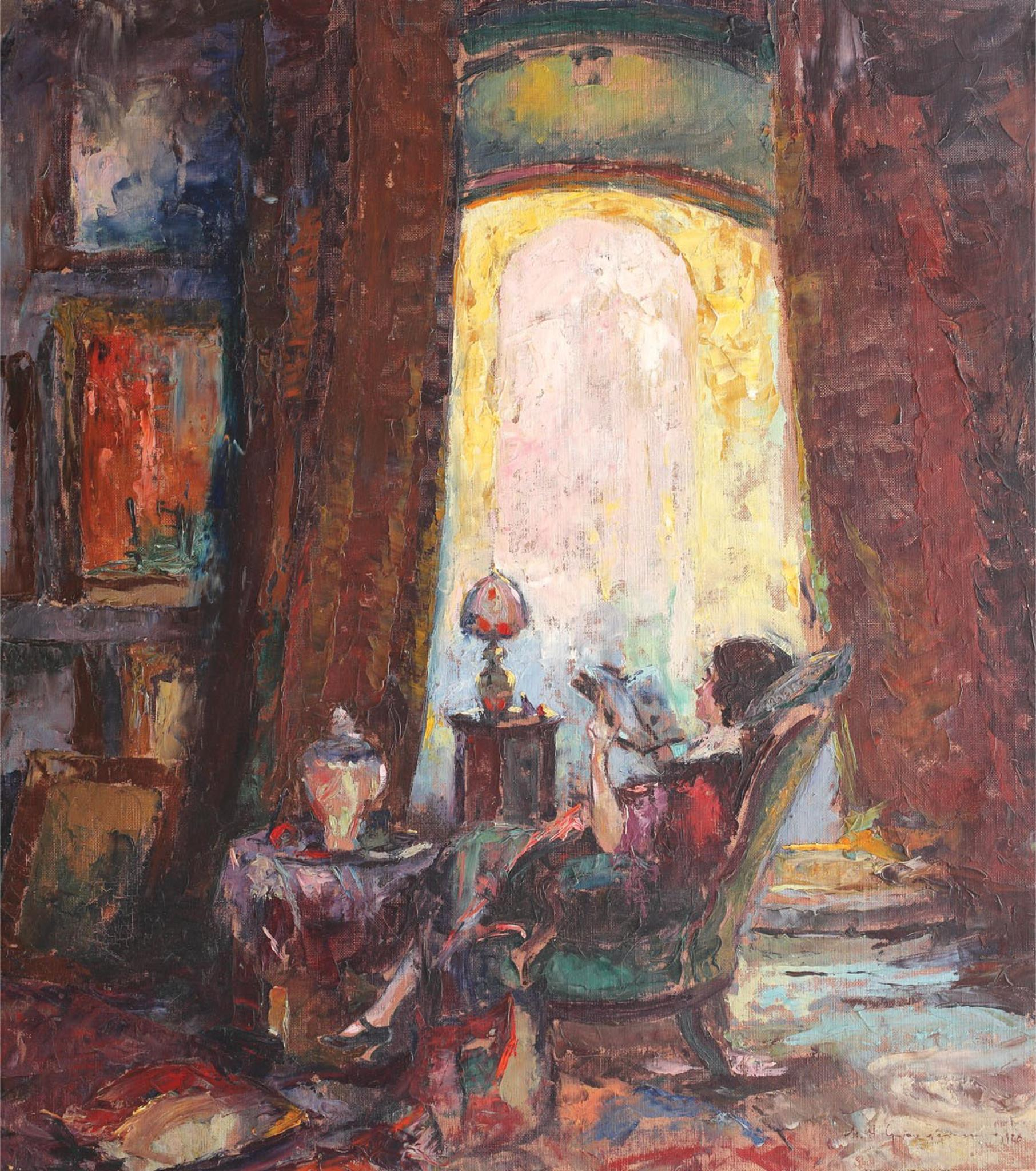
Reading
