= Natalia Dumitresco =

French painter

- Natalia Dumitresco in her studio, 1956
- Born: Natalia Dumitrescu; 20 December 1915; Bucharest, Romania
- Died: 3 July 1997 (aged 81); Chars, France
- Known for: Painting
- Movement: Abstract Art
- Spouse: Alexandre Istrati

Natalia Dumitresco (born Natalia Dumitrescu; 20 December 1915 in Bucharest, Romania – 3 July 1997 in Chars, France) was a French-Romanian abstract painter associated with the Réalités Nouvelles salon of Paris after the Second World War, a movement influenced by the art of Wassily Kandinsky and Alberto Magnelli. Other abstract expressionist painters associated with the Réalités Nouvelles include Serge Poliakoff and Alexandre Istrati. Dumitresco later married Alexandre Istrati.

After a number of years working in black and white, she tackled the problem of colors, showing originality and a great freshness of colors in her compositions.

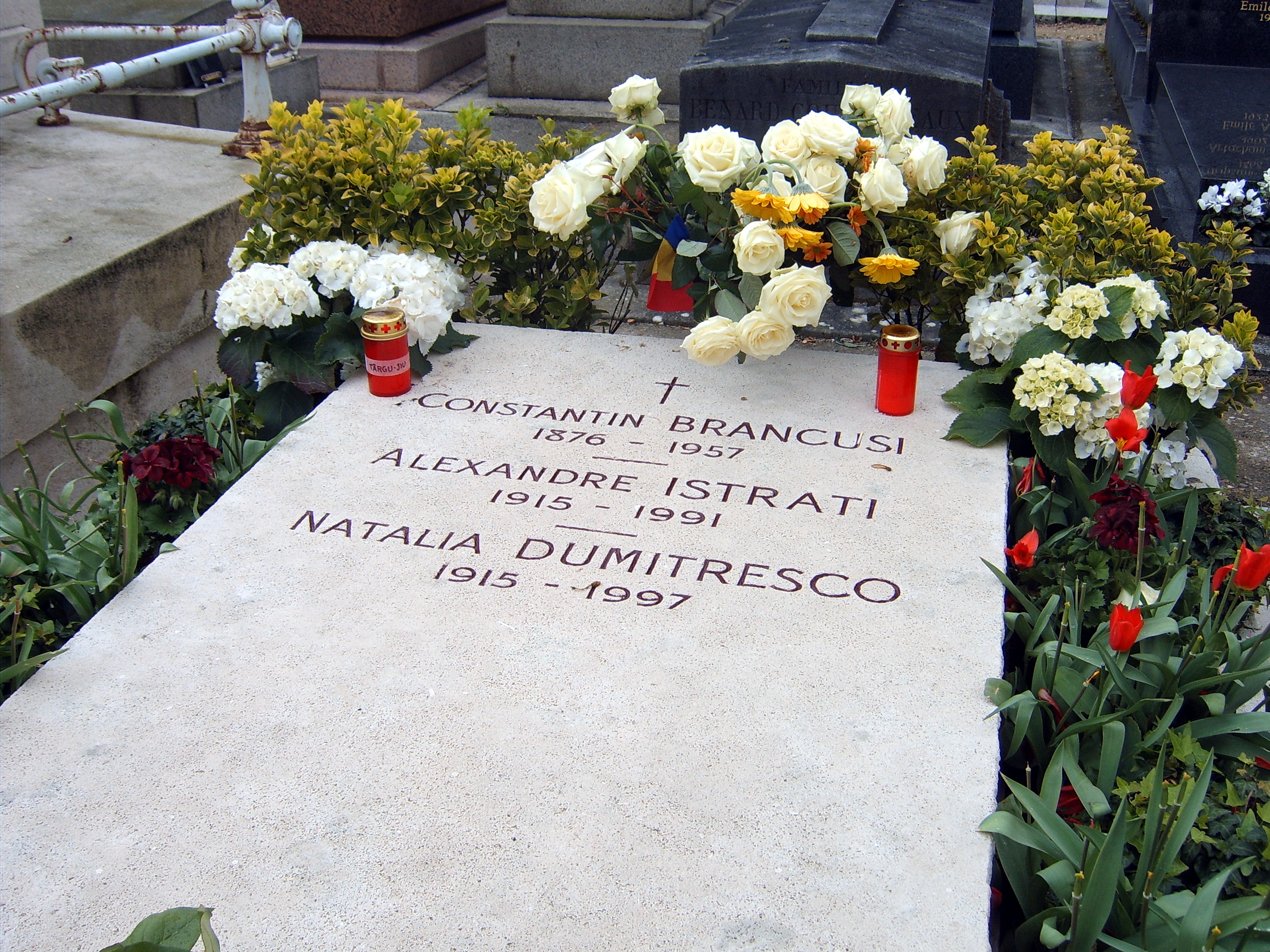
Grave of Constantin Brancusi, Alexandre Istrati and Natalia Dumitresco, Cimetière du Montparnasse, Paris

She and her husband are buried in the same grave as Constantin Brâncuși, in the Cimetière du Montparnasse.
