= Secăria =

- Commune
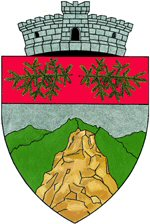
- Coat of arms

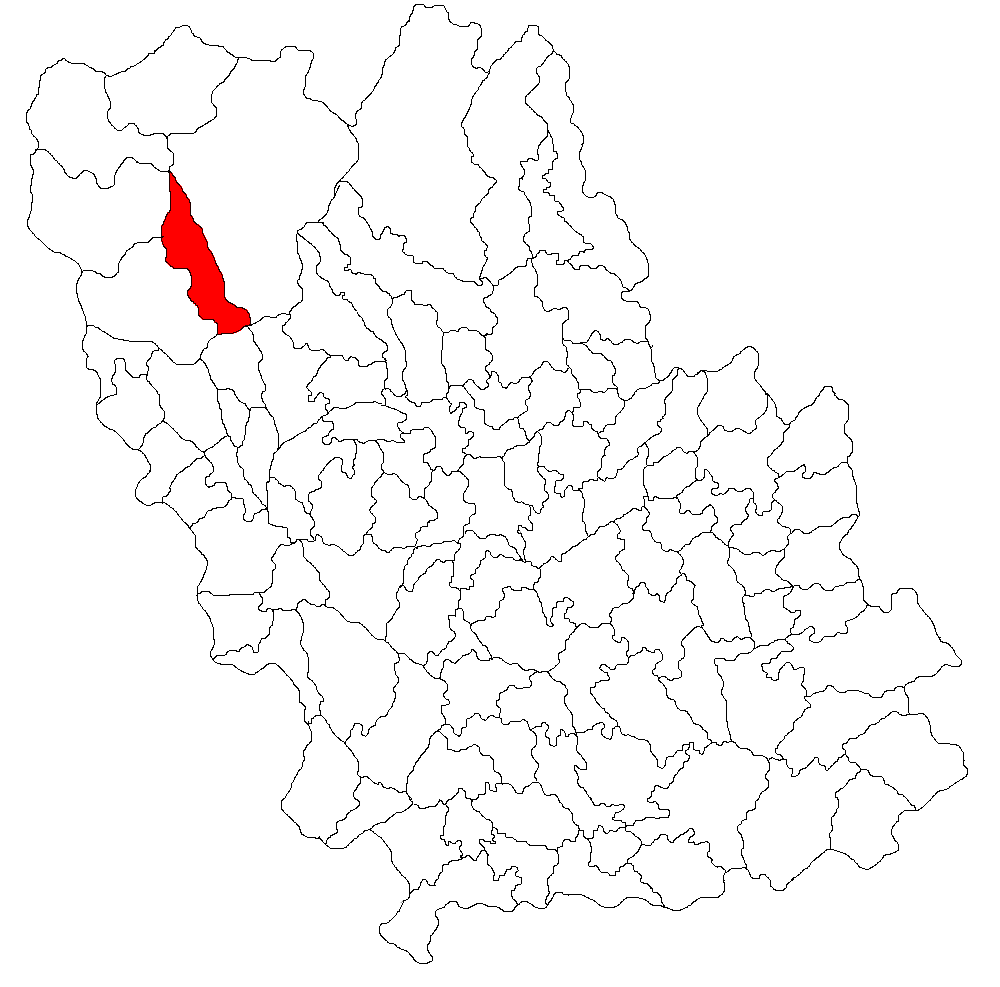
- Location in Prahova County

- Location in Romania
- Coordinates: 45°17′N 25°41′E
- Country: Romania
- County: Prahova

Government
  - Mayor (2020–2024): Gheorghe Aurelian Bălan (PSD)
- Area: 46.27 km^{2} (17.86 sq mi)
- Elevation: 801 m (2,628 ft)
- Population (2021-12-01): 1,078
  - Density: 23/km^{2} (60/sq mi)
- Time zone: EET/EEST (UTC+2/+3)
- Postal code: 107530
- Area code: +(40) 244
- Vehicle reg.: PH
- Website: primariasecaria.ro

Secăria is a commune in Prahova County, Muntenia, Romania. It is composed of a single village, Secăria.

Historical population
Year	Pop.	±%
1992	1,461	—
2002	1,362	−6.8%
2011	1,243	−8.7%
2021	1,078	−13.3%
Source: Census data
