= Alexandre Istrati =

Franco-Romanian painter

Alexandre Istrati (9 March 1915 in Dorohoi, Romania – 28 October 1991 in Paris, France) was a Franco-Romanian painter. He won numerous prizes, including 1953 Kandinsky Prize.

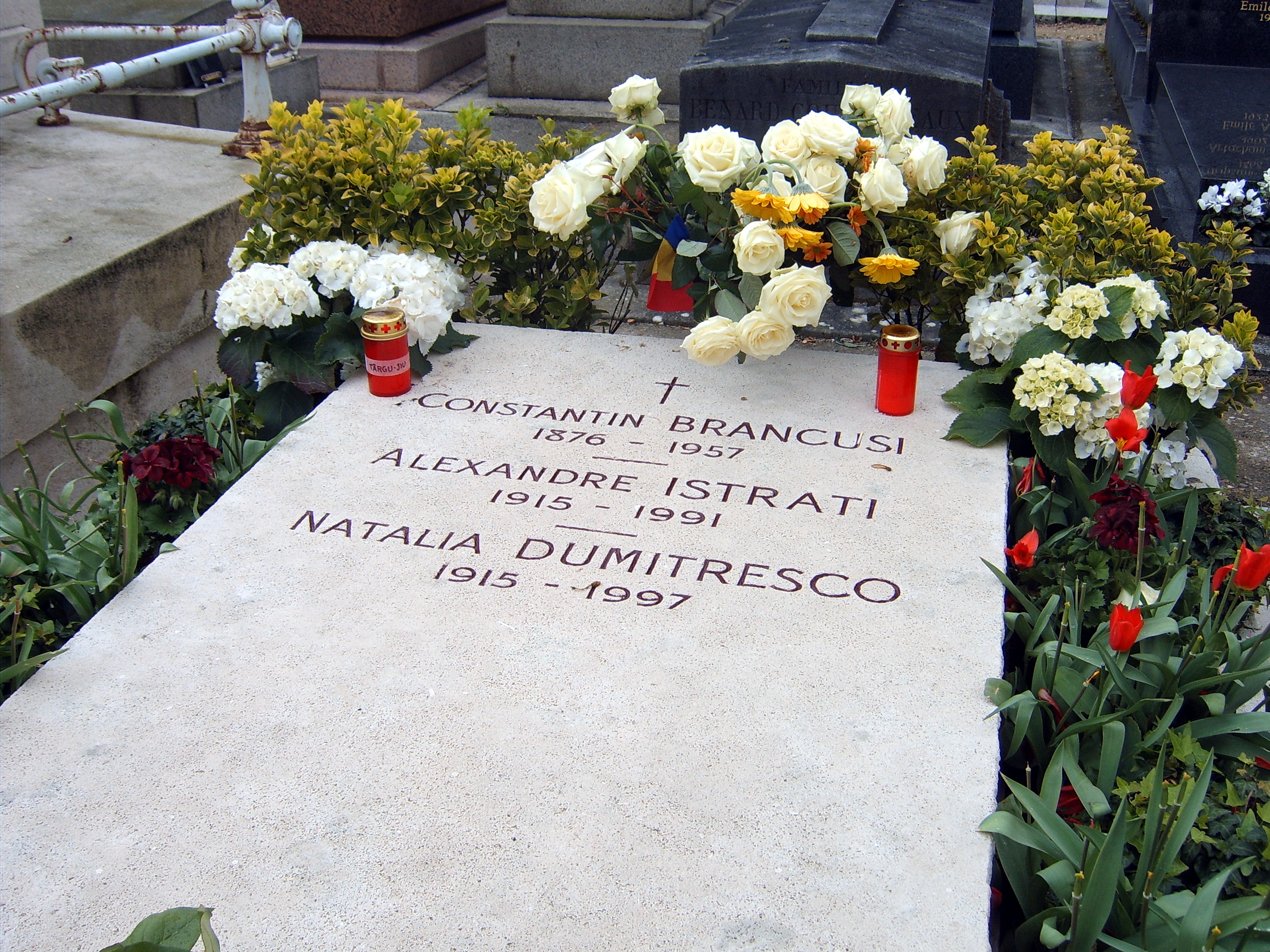
Grave of Constantin Brancusi, Alexandre Istrati and Natalia Dumitresco, Montparnasse Cemetery, Paris

He married fellow Romanian abstract expressionist painter, Natalia Dumitresco. They are buried in the same grave as their friend and fellow Romanian artist Constantin Brâncuși, in the Cimetière du Montparnasse, Paris.

== See also ==
- Natalia Dumitresco
