= Victor Schivert =

Victor Schivert (1863–1926?) was a Romanian painter and illustrator known for genre subjects and portraits.

Schivert painted illustrations of the Thirty Years War. One of his paintings, Kriegsbeute, was reported stolen in 2005 from the Czech Republic.

His father was the painter Albert Gustav Schivert (1826–1881).

== Gallery ==
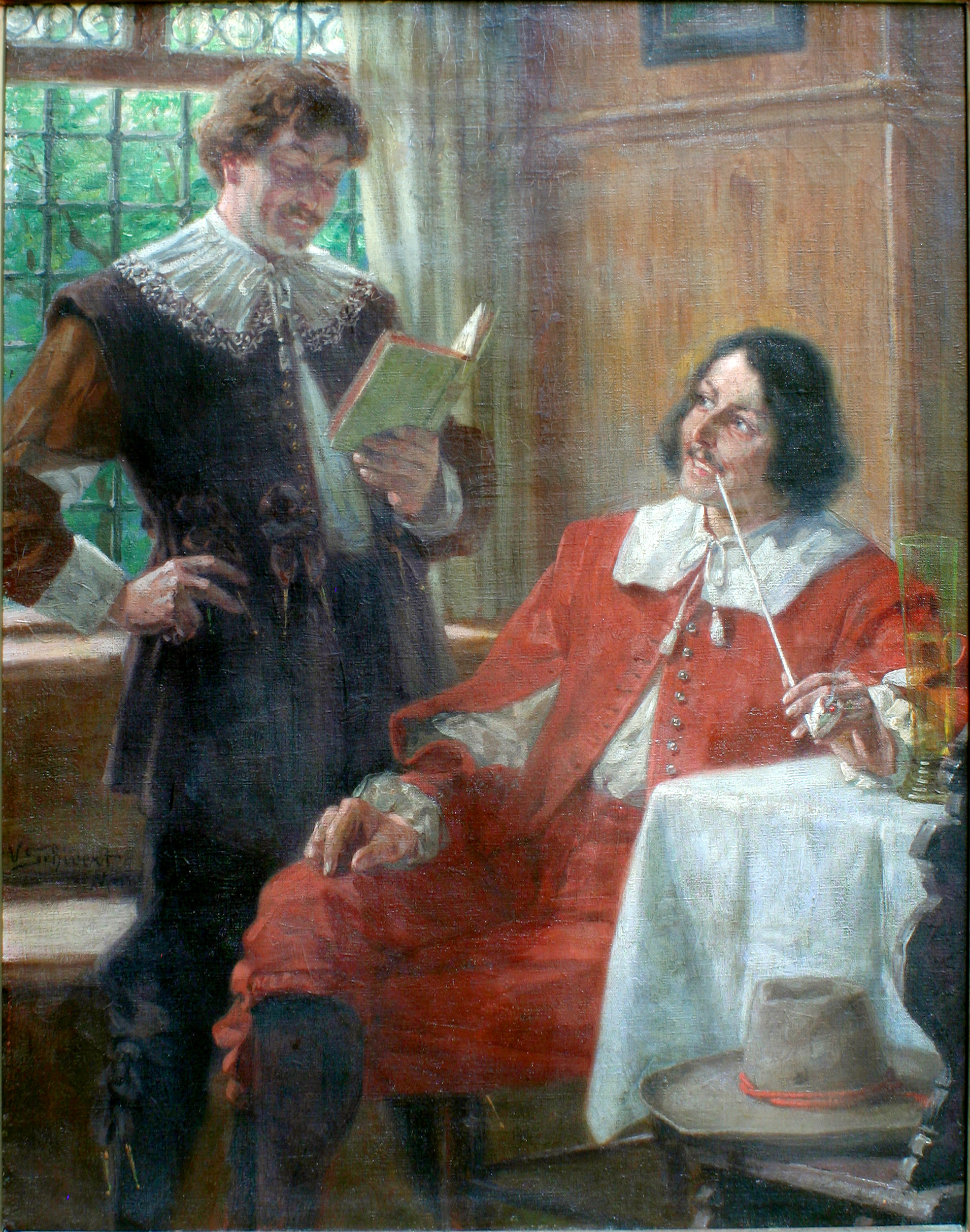
A Good Story

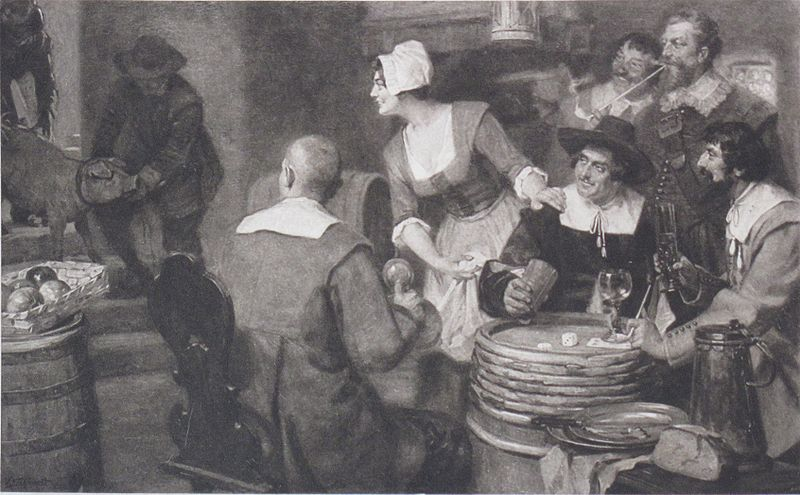
Kriegsbeute, oil painting, 144x99 cm

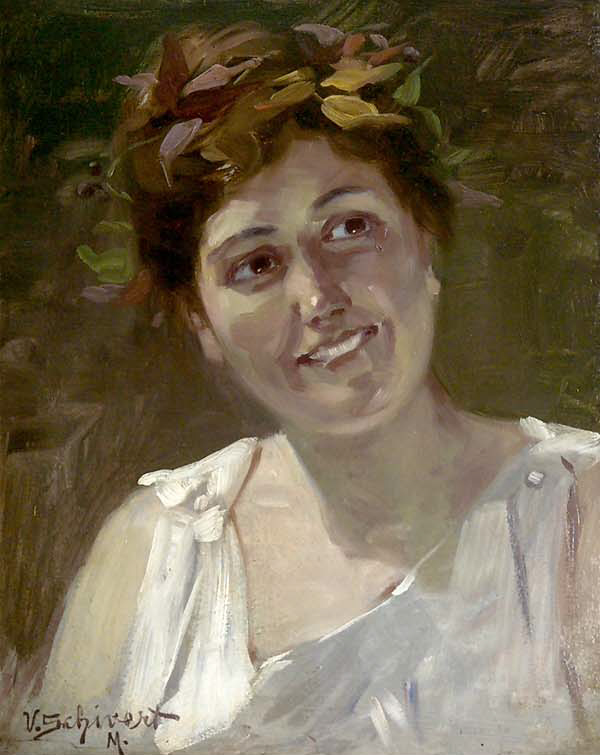
Portrait of a Girl

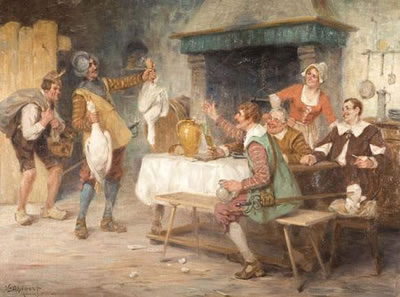
Good Prey

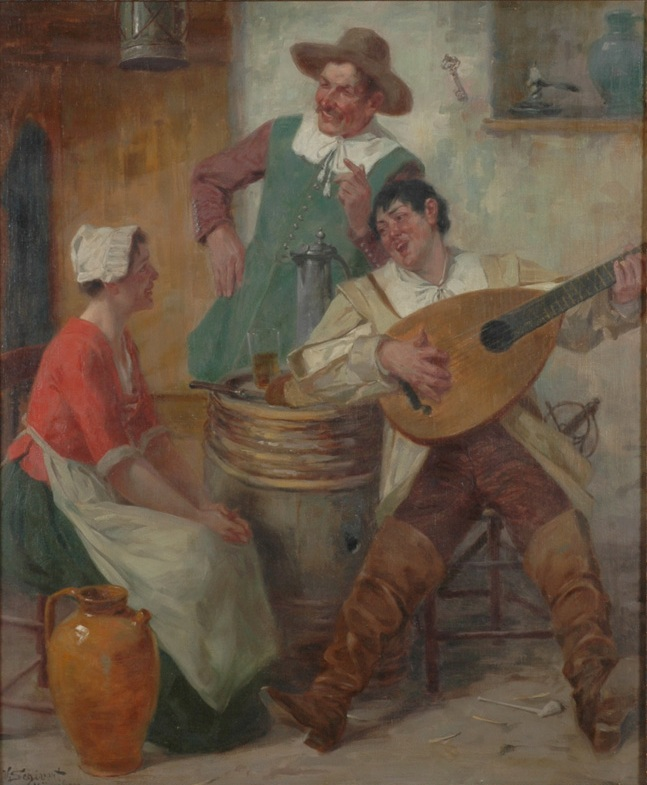
Tavern Scene (30-year War)

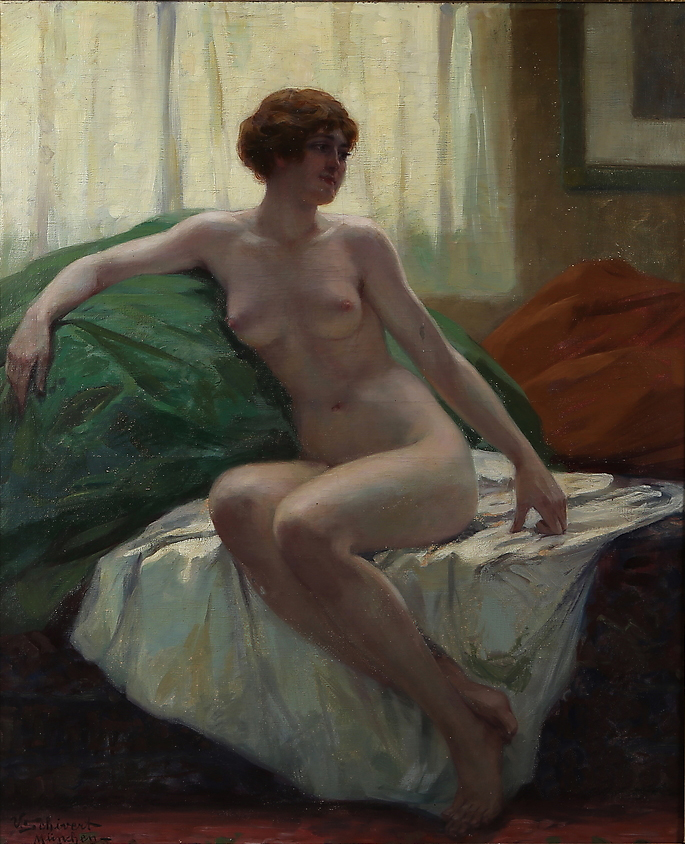
Nude Study, c. 1910
