= Eugeniu Voinescu =

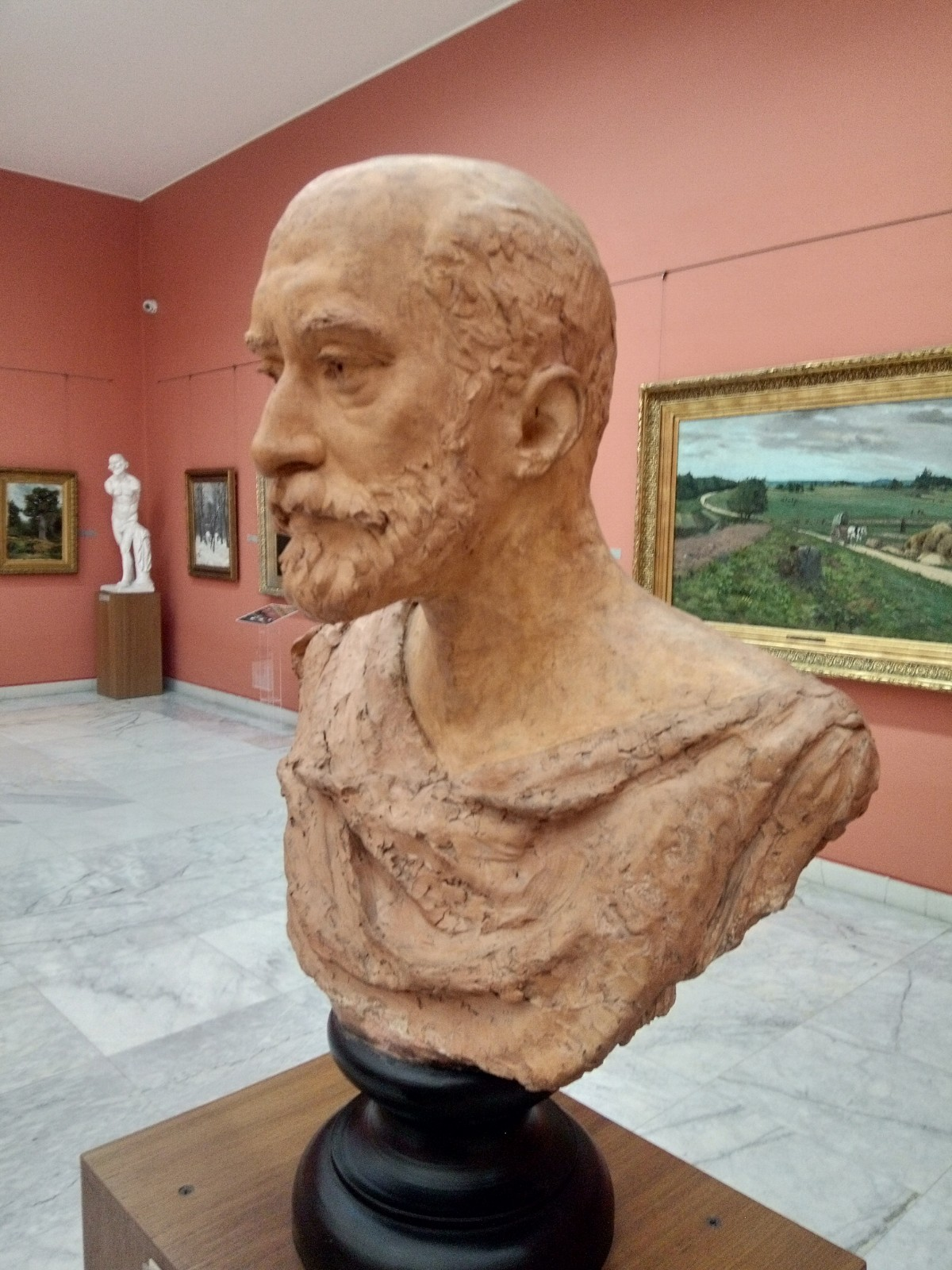
Portrait bust of Eugeniu Voinescu, by Ștefan Ionescu-Valbudea (1890)

Eugeniu Voinescu (commonly Eugen; 26 May 1842, Iași – 6 May 1909, Bucharest) was a Romanian diplomat and painter, who specialized in maritime scenes.

== Biography ==
Following the wishes of his family, he originally studied law and literature. After spending some time studying in Athens, he went to Paris where he befriended the French artist, Gustave Courbet, who stimulated his interest in painting directly from nature. In 1869, he was awarded a prize at the Salon.

As a result of his legal studies, he also served as Romanian consul general in Budapest (1879), Istanbul (1882), and Odessa (1883-1888). While in Odessa, he became acquainted with Ivan Aivazovsky, who helped him develop his interest in marine painting. In 1889, he held his first major exhibition at a salon held in the new Romanian Athenaeum.

Although he was lauded as Romania's best maritime artist by Nicolae Iorga, he also painted portraits and genre works, as well as historical and biblical scenes. An important aspect of his career is that he was financially independent, so his painting always remained a hobby, even when he participated in decorating churches, such as the Cathedral of Saint Charalambos in Turnu Măgurele and the Church of Saint Nicholas in Bucharest. He was also one of the founders of the School of Decorative Arts at the Bucharest National University of Arts.

In 2011, Poșta Română issued a series of four commemorative stamps honoring Romanian artists, and one of Voinescu's paintings was chosen for the 2.10 Lei denomination.

== Selected paintings ==
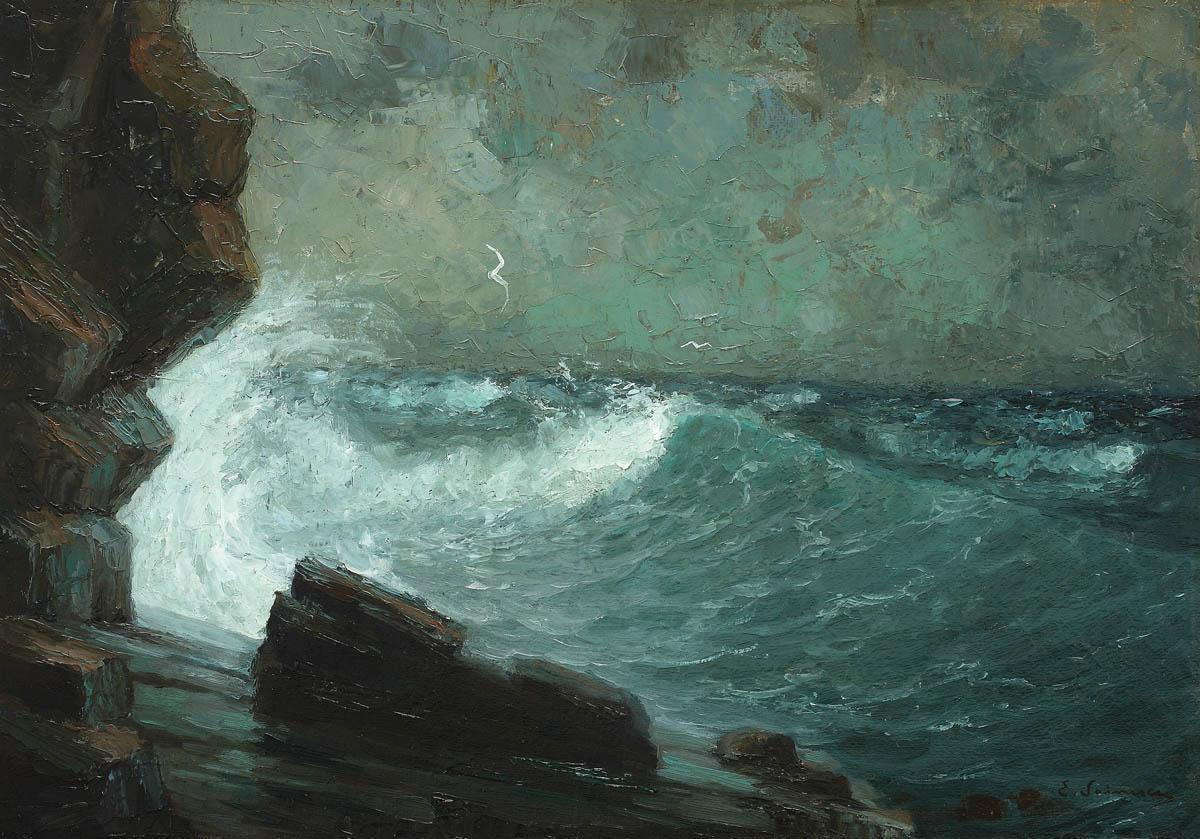
Cape Caliacra During a Storm

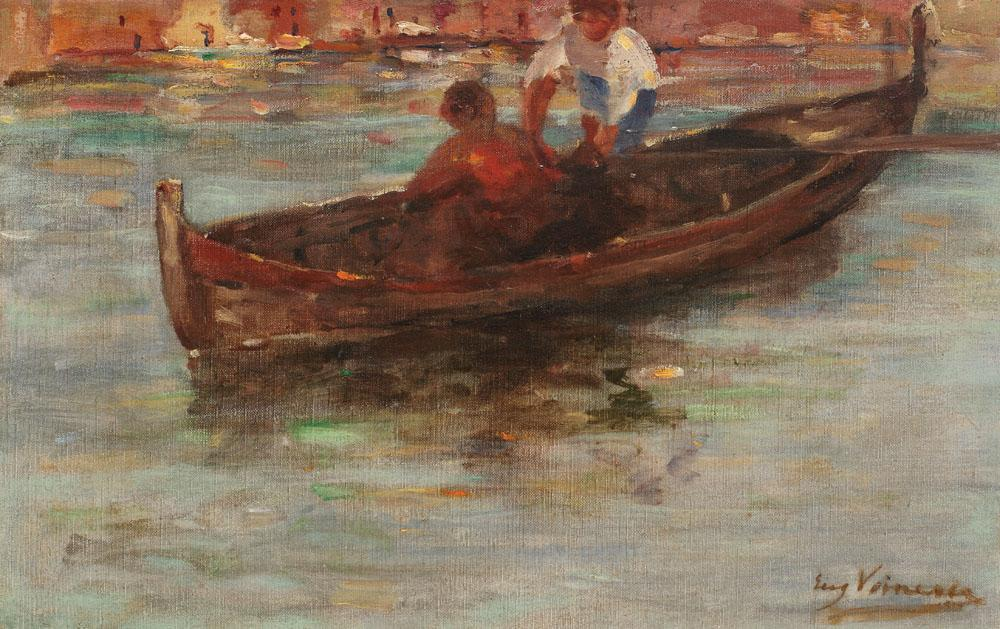
Children Paddling on a Lagoon

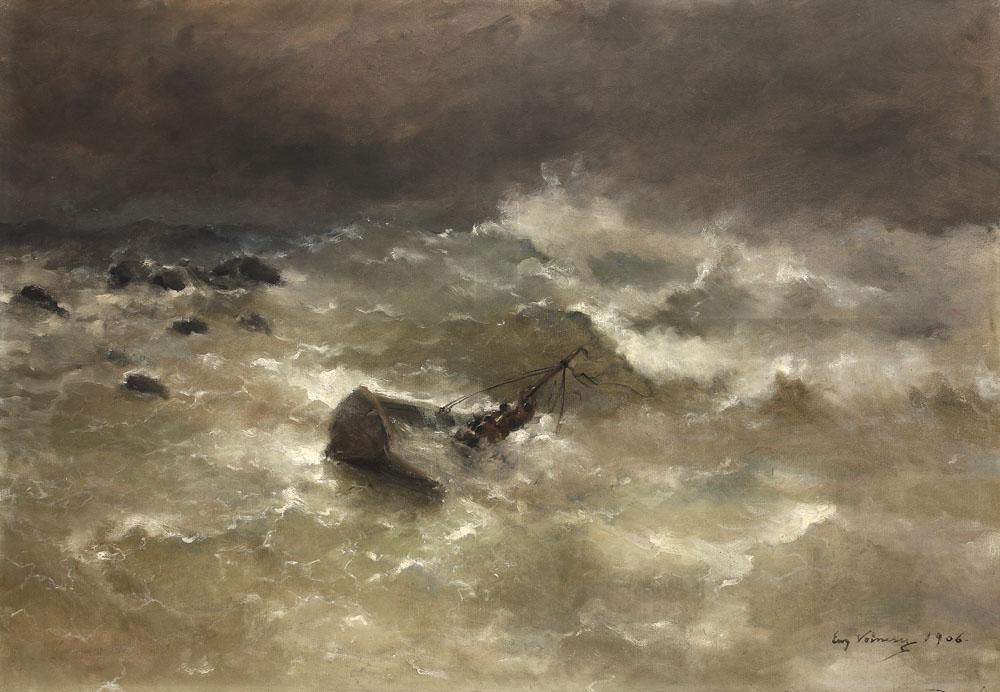
Adrift
