= Lili Pancu =

- Born: September 13, 1908; Kingdom of Romania
- Died: 2006
- Occupation: Painter

Lili Pancu (1908-2006) was a Romanian painter in the 20th century. She studied at the Bucharest Belle Arte school with Cecilia Cutescu-Storck, Ipolit Strâmbu and Jean Steriadi. At the age of 22 she received the Anastase Simu prize and the prize of the city of Bucharest. She continued painting well after the age of 70 in her "well tempered modernist style".
