= Virgil Preda =

Virgil Preda (2 September 1923 - 23 October 2011) was a Romanian painter.

== Studies ==
- Finished his studies at the Private Academy of Art in Bucharest in 1948.
- Studied at the Law University between 1943 and 1947, in Bucharest.

== Debut ==
- Preda was born in Bucharest. He exhibited for the first time at the yearly exhibition in 1962 in Bucharest.

== One man shows România ==
- 1965 Painting exhibition "Galateea" Gallery Bucharest
- 1969 Painting exhibition "Orizont" Gallery Bucharest
- 1975 Painting exhibition "Eforie" Gallery Bucharest
- 1978 Painting exhibition "Eforie" Gallery Bucharest
- 1983 Istituto Italiano di Cultura in România Bucharest
- 1985 Painting exhibition "Orizont" Gallery Bucharest
- 1994 Painting exhibition "Simeza" Gallery
- 1996 Painting exhibition Gallery of Brazilian Embassy in Bucharest.
- 2001 Painting exhibition "Simeza" Gallery, Bucharest

== One man shows opened abroad ==
- 1977 - "Raffadali" Galiery Raffadali, Italy
- 1979 - Romano Galiery Agrigento, Italy
- 1990 Painting exhibition: attitude dialogue Galiery "Orizont" Bucharest

== Group exhibitions in the state and abroad ==
- 1971 "Apollo" Galiery Bucharest
- 1983 "Căminul Artei" Galiery Bucharest
- 1984 "Eforie Galiery" Bucharest
- 1986 "Orizont Galiery" Bucharest
- 1990 "Orizont Galiery" Bucharest
- 1968 Romanian art exhibition Orly, France
- 1969 Romanian art exhibition Prague Tcecoslovaquie
- 1973 Romanian art exhibition Venice, Italy
- Romanian art exhibition Tokyo, Japan
- 1984 Exhibition at Academia Romena di Cultura Roma, Italy
- 1985 Exhibition 18 Painters from România Rotour Tamnusanlage 18 Galiery FrankfurtamMain Germany
- 1992 Romanian art exhibition "Steven Metzier" Gallery Denver Colorado-SUA

== Private collections in Romania and abroad ==
- Romania, France, Italy, Germany, Belgium, Hungary, Japan, U.S.A.

== Bibliography ==
- Octavian Barbosa 'The Dictionary of Romanian Contemporary Artists";
- Dan Grigorescu Idea and Sensibility;
- Alexandru Cebuc, Vasile Florea, Negoiţă Lăptoiu - The encyclopedia of the contemporary Romanian artist. Ed. ARC 2000 Bucharest
