= Alexandru Darida =

American painter

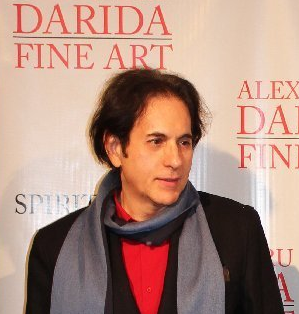
- Born: May 15, 1955 (age 71); Satu Mare, Romania

Alexandru Darida (born May 15, 1955) is an artist known for his pioneering social activist art. His work includes oil paintings, drawings, and acrylic sculpture that speak to such diverse subjects as the promotion of stem cell research and the politically charged relationship of man with nature.

== Early life and education ==
Born to an Italian father and Romanian mother, Darida grew up in the city of Satu Mare. After graduating from the Ecole des Beaux Arts in Romania, in 1978, Darida struggled with the restraints on creative freedom imposed by the communist regime. In 1985, Darida left Romania for Italy and enrolled for studies at the Benedetti Liberal Academy of Art in Rome. In 1987, Darida sought the help of Clelio Darida (no relation), undersecretary of the Minister of the Interior, former mayor of Rome as he was still being harassed by the Romanian government. Darida immigrated to the United States that year, where he continued his studies at the American Academy of Art in Chicago.

== Artistic style and reviews ==
Darida's style is associated with chiaroscuro a technique that uses strong contrasts between light and dark. Many of Darida's works feature, or are applied to musical instruments and/or incorporate natural and man made objects as part of the "Vibrant Expression" style. For his sculpture, he works in the medium of acrylic, and his forms are influenced by the Romanian sculptor Constantin Brâncuși (1876–1957). Darida's sculptures use the transparency of acrylic to create layers of thin glazes, echoing the technique that he applies in his paintings.

Darida tackles controversial issues such as stem cell research, renewable green energy sources, man's place in relation to nature, and music related to the cosmic forces. He explains that color, or absence of color, as well as the shape and meaning of his work have roots in a certain universal energy.

Claudia Moscovici wrote: Darida considers art to be "the soul of the people" and feels that "if you touch people's hearts then that art will stay forever". "Darida's women are allegorical phantasms that populate our childhood fantasies and dreams. His application of paint is both delicate and rough; soft plays of light and shadow highlight the luminosity of gold. At the same time, the vitality of heavy, swirling paint applied with a palette knife endow his paintings with a modern feel."

Sarah Seamark, Editor in Chief of Art World wrote: "Darida utilizes found objects that merge elements of abstract and sculptural forms that represents a reconciliation with self and our surroundings. Their use, in combination with Darida's classic painting technique, is designed to create a distinguished, forward-looking style."

== Awards and recognition ==
Darida's museum placements include the Powerhouse Museum and the Sydney Opera House in Sydney, Australia, and his work had been featured at Municipal Galleries across Romania, in the Smithsonian Museum in Washington DC, and the Illinois State Museum. He is the recipient of awards including the Formello-Roma International Prize for Painting and the Award for Excellence in the Multimedia Miniatures Show in Romania. Alexandru is heavily involved with music and paints to music. Darida often finds inspiration in the voice of his wife who is an opera singer.

== Awards, charities and affiliations ==
- President's Award American Electrology Association, 2012
- Holiday Fundraiser for Romanian Cultural Exchange, 2012
- Award of Excellence, City of Chicago, 2010
- The Art of Human Rights, benefiting Heartland Alliance, 2010
- Chicago Symphony Orchestra Bridges between Art & Music - benefiting CSO's outreach programs targeting all segments of the Chicago community. Ref: "Painted Violins: Bridges Between Art & Music" by Lori Dana, 2010
- Benefit night for Cystic Fibrosis Scholarship Foundation, 2009
- Misericordia Heart of Mercy, Chicago, provides a continuum of care and network of services for people with developmental disabilities. Darida worked as a teacher, helping children to prepare an art show where their artworks were auctioned as a fundraiser, 2008
- Art against Aids - Heartland Alliance, 2008
- Sotheby's Legends of our Time Art Show and Auction benefiting The Rett Syndrome Research Foundation, 2001

== Commissions ==
- Portrait of Mircea Eliade, Romanian historian of religion, fiction writer, philosopher, and professor at the University of Chicago. Commissioned by Chicago University in collaboration with George Predescu, Romanian Consul General in Chicago, 2009
- Benefit night for Cystic Fibrosis Scholarship Foundation, 2009
- Portrait of Nicolae Titulescu, well-known Romanian diplomat and Minister of Foreign Affairs for Romania 1927–1928, commissioned by Dr. Eliot Sorel director of the SiMARC Foundation and professor at George Washington University, 1999

== National and international publications, reviews and articles ==
- National Register's Who's Who | Library of Congress | ISBN 0-9702264-3-8
- Watch Alex Darida la TVRi | RTN Chicago Episodes | Blip, May 2012
- www.Clipa.com/Darida. "Pictura Lui Darida." Key words: Clipa.com/ artist Darida
- "Occidentul Romanesc -Alexandru Darida" May 22, 2011 Review - Art Show Chicago. Magazine in Romanian language edited in Spain.
- Romania USA Gandacul de Colorado Alexandru Darida - Review for the City Hall Chicago Art Show April 20, 2010
- Romania Libera, March 20, 2010, review: Alexandru Darida City Hall Chicago Exhibition
- Romanticism and Postromanticism by Claudia Moscovici, Lexington books, hardcover 2007, paperback 2010 - " The Iconic Art of Alexandru Darida"
- Art World News, September 2009 - "Darida, Pioneer and Social Activist," article by Sarah Seamark, Editor in Chief
- Art Business News, January 2009 - "Artist Rides the Green Wave," article by Gabriel Kiley
- Romanian Tribune, July 11, 2008 - Review of the art of Alexandru Darida in relation to nature
- Art World News, May 2008 - "Darida's Work a Catalyst to Preserve Nature," article by
- Sarah Seamark, Editor in Chief
- Alexandru Darida's artwork appears in "Wurzeln im Licht Sathmar 2006 -Helmut Berner " Zeitgenossische Rumanische Lyrik Antologie de poezie Romaneasca- Radacini in Lumina This is a bilingual Romanian -German Anthology of Romanian poetry. The book is illustrated with art of Romanian artists from all over the world
- Arbus, December 2006, North Florida's Arts & Business magazine - "Painter Alexandru Darida - Venetian Dreams," review by Madelaine Peck
- Art World News, July 2005 - " Darida's Painted Musical Sculptures." Key words: Darida's musical sculptures. www.shareholder.com
- Art World News, May 2001, Artist Vitae - "Alexandru Darida: The Pursuit of Artistic Freedom," article by Joelle Blaskey
- America- Newspaper September 1999, "Powerful Call to Fight Breast Cancer," article by Mariana Cuceu MD.

== Selected exhibitions ==
- 2012- Shanghai Art Fair
- 2011- Illinois State Museum, Southern Illinois Art & Artisans Center, Whittington IL
- 2010- City Hall of Chicago
- 2010- River East Art Center, Chicago
- 2010- Dali-Lamb Museum, Chicago
- 2009- The Peggy Notebaert Nature Museum, Chicago
- 2009- REpose Gallery, Chicago, "Global Consciousness"
- 2007- International Artexpo New York
- 2006- International Artexpo New York
- 2005- Mozart Gallery, Chicago, "Celebration of Music"
- 2003- Fine Art Forum, Metropolitan Pavilion, Chelsea District of New York City
- 2002- International Artexpo New York
- 2001- International Artexpo New York
- 2000- International Artexpo Las Vegas
- 1999- Smithsonian Folklife Festival Art Show, Washington, DC
