= Ion Grigorescu =

Romanian painter

Ion Grigorescu (born March 15, 1945, in Bucharest) is a Romanian painter who was one of the first Romanian conceptual artists.

Grigorescu is the creator of numerous films, photographic series, and actions recorded on film, as well as drawings and collages. His subjects include both his private life and the passage of the Romanian people from life under communism to capitalism.

== Personal exhibitions – selection ==
- 2013 – Trauma of the Exposed Body, prometeogallery di Ida Pisani, Church San Matteo, Lucca
- 2011 – Performing History, the Romanian Pavilion at the 54th International exhibition La Biennale di Venezia
- 2011 – Rome seen with the eyes / Rome invented, with Bogdan Vladuţă, workshop, Andreiana Mihail Gallery, Bucharest;
- Grigorescu, galeria Mitterand, Zuerich; Horse, Men Market, (personal) Friedrichshof Sammlung; Grigorescu, Enseigne des Oudin, Paris;
- 2011 - Back to Back - with Ciprian Muresan, Andreiana Mihail Gallery, Bucharest
- 2010 – Oedipus The Wanderer, Gregor Podnar gallery, Berlin;
- 2009 – The Poor people are fending for themselves Angels Gallery, Barcelona;
- In the Body of the Victim, retrospective Modern Art Museum Warsaw; Lili Dujourie and Ion Grigorescu, Ludlow 38, New York;
- 2008 – Superpositions, Jean-Gabriel Mitterand Gallery, Paris;
- Le Temps a modifié les lieux, Enseigne des Oudin, Paris; Retrospective Ion Grigorescu, Artra Gallery, Milano;
- 2007 - Ressources, with Geta Brătescu, M.N.A.C. Bucharest
- 2006 – Am Boden, Salzburg, Kunstverein;
- 2004 - Fotografii recente, Bucuresti, personal exhibition, Galeria Noua, Bucharest
- 1998 - National Museum of Art, Kretzulescu hall, Bucharest, personal exhibition
- 1993 - Mahlzeit für eine tote Kunst, Schauplatz Zeitgenossischer Kunst, Vienna

== Group exhibitions ==
- 1981 - São Paulo Biennale, Brasil
- 1990 - Points East, Third's Eye Gallery Glasgow,
- 1991 - Wanderlieder, Stedelijk Museum Amsterdam
- 1994 - São Paulo Biennale, Brasil
- 1997 - Venice Biennale, Romanian Pavilion
- 1998 - Out of Actions, MOCA Los Angeles, Vienna, Barcelona, Tokyo;
- Body and the East, Moderna Galertja, Ljubljana
- 2000 - 2000+Collection, Ljublijana,
- 2001 - Double Life, Generali Foundation Vienna,
- Remedy for Melancholy, Edsvik Art, Sollentuna
- 2002 - Auf der Suche nach Balkanien, Graz neue Gallerie;
- In den Schluchten des Balkan, Friedericianum Kassel;
- 2003 - Prophetic Remix, M.N.A.C. Bucharest;
- Prophetic Corners, Iaşi
- 2004 - Bienala Cetinje, Love It or Leave It;
- Revolutions reloaded, Artra Gallery, Milan; Arteast, Moderna galerija, Ljubljana; Prolog, National Museum Arad, Romania; Formate, Bukarest, Kunsthalle Vienna; M.N.A.C., Bucharest, Vă place palatul Ceauşescu?;
- 2005 - Lisbon, Gulbenkian Foundation, Paradoxes, Embodying the city;
- 2006 – Kontakte, colectia Erstebank, MUMOK Vienna;
- Autopoesis, National Gallery Bratislava
- 2007 – Lund, Kunsthall, Possible in art
- Documenta 12, Kassel Dadaeast, (Zürich, Prague, Stockholm, Sibiu, Warsaw), Exit memory, desire, October, Artra, Milano
- 2008 – Crisis, galeria Angels Barcelona
- 2009 – Subversive Practices, Stuttgarter Kunstverein;
- Agents et Provocateurs, Dunaujvaros; Gender Check, Ludwigsmuseum Vienna
- 2010 – Subversive practices, Trafo, Budapest;
- Promesses du Passe, Centre Pompidou; 4th Biennale Berlin; Bienala Bucurestiului, Bucharest and Stockholm; Agents and Provocateurs, Hartware Medien Kunstverein, Dortmund; Romanian Art, Leipzig, Spinnerei Frieze Art Fair London
- 2011 – Out of Place, Tate Modern Gallery, London;
- Desene, Andreiana Mihail Gallery, Bucharest; Venice Biennale, Romanian Pavilion; Ostalgia, New Museum New York;

== Awards ==
- 2020 – Order of Cultural Merit, Knight rank
- 1998 – Award for the church restoration painting
- 1998 – Award of the magazine Cuvântul
- 1993 – Award Andrei Cădere
- 1978, 1989 – Award of the art critics, Romania
- 1972 – Youth Award Romanian Union of Artists

== Bibliography ==
- Beeren, Wim in ”Wanderlieder” exhibition catalogue, Stedelijk Museum, Amsterdam, 1991
- Stiles, Kristine ”Uncorrupted Joy” in “Out of Action: Between Performance and the Object, 1949–1979” exhibition catalogue, MOCA, Los Angeles, 1998
- Pintilie, Ileana ”Actionism in Romania during the Communist Era”, IDEA Publishing House, Cluj, 2002
- Kreuger, Anders “There is no transparence or appearance” and Faria, Nuno “Deja-vu. Some notes on Paradoxes: the embodied city” in "Paradoxes: the Embodied City", Gulbenkian Foundation, Lisbon, 2005
- Saxenhuber, Hedwig ”...that they mark everyday life in its depth”, in Springerin, Band XI, Heft 1 Fruejahr, Vienna, 2005
- Cel ce se pedepsește singur. Stefan Bertalan, Florin Mitroi, Ion Grigorescu. Arta și România în anii 80–90, Editura Institutului Cultural Român, 2009
- Experiment în arta românească după 1960”- Adrian Guță, Performance art în România între 1980–1996, p. 79, Centrul Soros pentru artă contemporană, 1997
- Alexandra Titu, Experimentul în arta românească după 1960, Ion Grigorescu, Editura Meridiane 2003
- Ion Grigorescu, Studiul 3, Prolog, Editura Institutului Cultural Român, 2009
- Ion Grigorescu, Catalogul Romanian Cultural Resolution, editat de Editura Hatje Cantz, 2011;
- Ion Grigorescu, Catalogue de l'exposition „Les Promesses du Passé, Centre Pompidou, 2010;
- Ion Grigorescu, exhibition catalog, Ressources, with Geta Brătescu, M.N.A.C. Bucharest, 2007;
- Catalogul proiectului Performing History sub forma unui supliment special al numărului 38 al revistei "IDEA artă+societate", 2011
- Ion Grigorescu, exhibition catalog The poor people are fending for themselves, Angeles Gallery Barcelona, 2009;
- Ion Grigorescu: In the Body of the Victim, author Marta Dziewanska, Museum of Modern Art in Warsaw, 2011
