= Rudolf Schweitzer-Cumpăna =

Romanian painter

Rudolf Schweitzer-Cumpăna (May 7, 1886 – February 17, 1975) was a Romanian painter. Born in Pitești into an ethnic German family, he finished high school in his native town before attending the Royal Academy of Arts at Berlin from 1904 to 1909, studying under Erich Hancke, Arthur Kampf and Anton von Werner. He then returned to Romania, where he worked prodigiously on scenes and portraits drawn from village life, houses, still lifes, churches and monasteries. He died in Bucharest.
