= Olos (disambiguation) =

Olos or OLOS may refer to:

- Olos, an album by the Finnish rock group Absoluuttinen Nollapiste.
- Mihai Olos, Romanian conceptual artist, poet
- Krzysztof Oloś, Polish keyboardist for the symphonic black metal band Vesania
- OLOS (obstructed-line-of-sight) see Non-line-of-sight propagation
