= Palma Bucarelli =

Italian art historian, curator and administrator

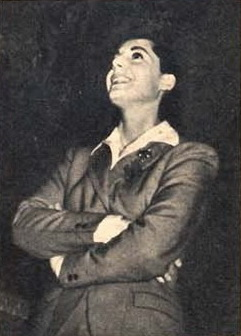
- Born: March 16, 1910; Rome, Kingdom of Italy
- Died: July 25, 1998 (aged 88); Rome, Italy
- Education: Sapienza University of Rome
- Occupation: Art historian

Palma Bucarelli (16 March 1910 – 25 July 1998) was an Italian art historian, curator and administrator, mostly known for her tenure as director of the Galleria Nazionale d'Arte Moderna (GNAM) in Rome from 1942 to 1975.

== Early life ==
Palma Bucarelli was born in Rome. She earned a degree in art history at the Sapienza University of Rome.

== Career ==
As a young art historian she worked at the Galleria Borghese in Rome and in Naples. During her thirty-three years as head of the Italian National Gallery of Modern Art, Bucarelli was responsible for protecting the gallery's collections from damage while it was closed during World War II; she arranged to place paintings and sculptures in historic buildings including the Palazzo Farnese and Castel Sant'Angelo. She was one of the Italian delegates to the First International Congress of Art Critics, held in 1948 in Paris.

After the war, she oversaw such events as exhibitions of works by Pablo Picasso (1953), Piet Mondrian (1956), Jackson Pollock (1958), Mark Rothko (1962), and the Gruppo di Via Brunetti (1968). She defended controversial works such as Piero Manzoni's '"Merda d'Artista" and Alberto Burri's "Sacco Grande" (1954). Her strong support for abstract and avant-garde works made international headlines in 1959, when she was accused of a bias against figurative art in a public debate. In 1961 she was in the United States, where she gave a lecture in Sarasota, Florida and attended the opening of a major exhibit on Futurism at the Detroit Institute of Arts.

== Personal life ==
Palma Bucarelli married her longtime partner, journalist Paolo Monelli, in 1963. She died in Rome in 1998, from pancreatic cancer, aged 88 years. Her personal collection of art was donated to the National Gallery. Her famously elegant wardrobe was donated to the Boncompagni Ludovisi Decorative Art Museum in Rome. A street near the GNAM was renamed in her memory. The Gallery mounted a show about her influence, "Palma Bucarelli: Il museo come avanguardia", in 2009.

== Honours ==
Cordone di gran Croce OMRI BAR

In April 1975 Bucarelli was knighted the “Grand Cross of Order of Merit of the Italian Republic” by the President of Italy, Giovanni Leone.
