= Pino Pascali =

Italian sculptor (1935–1968)

- Born: 19 October 1935; Bari, Italy
- Died: 11 September 1968 (aged 32); Rome, Italy
- Known for: Sculpture
- Movement: Arte Povera

Pino Pascali (19 October 1935 – 11 September 1968) was an Italian artist, sculptor, set designer and performer.

== Biography ==
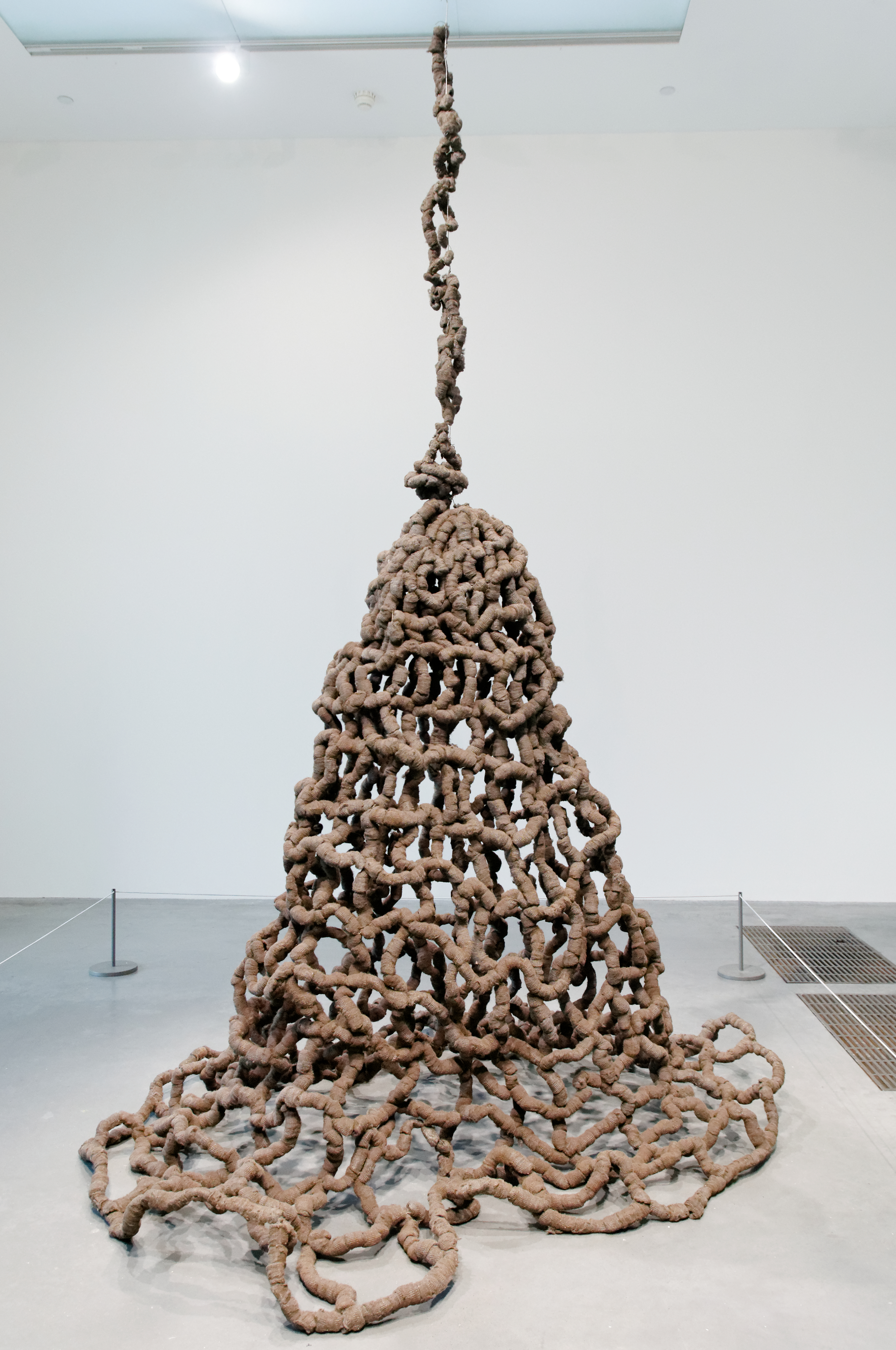
Trap, 1968, Tate Modern

Pino Pascali was born on October 19, 1935, in Bari, Italy. In 1955, Pascali left the science-oriented school that he attended in Bari, and went to a secondary school specialized in the arts in Naples. Later, in 1956, he enrolled at the Accademia di Belle Arti di Roma, on the scenic design course held by Peppino Piccolo with the help of his assistant Fabio Vergoz. He also studied under the guidance of Toti Scialoja, whose open teaching approach encouraged students to experiment with diverse mediums and forms. In the context of the Accademia, Pascali met fellow Arte Povera artist Jannis Kounellis. Pascali also took part in a number of collective shows for young artists: 1956, the Painting Exhibition at the Istituto Tommaseo di Tivoli; 1956, Second Exhibition "Pennello d'argento" at the Circolo Culturale dell Vittorie in Rome; 1959, Scenic Design Show, at the 2nd Festival dei Due Mondi in Spoleto. Before Pascali graduated in 1959 he worked as an assistant scenic designer in many RAI productions and additionally collaborated with the Studio Saraceni, Lodolofilm and Incom as a set designer, graphic design, scriptwriter, and creative writer for television advertising, making sketches, creating characters and shorts for the ads.

In the early 1960s, Pascali exhibited his sculptures in a number of art exhibitions. In 1965 Pascali exhibited at Galleria La Tartaruga. In January 1968, he had an exhibition at the Galleria Ars Intermedia in Cologne, Germany.

Pascali died at the age of thirty-two on September 11, 1968, in Rome, Italy, following a motorcycle accident. His short career has served as an important contribution to post-war art.

== Works ==
In 1965, Pascali had a solo exhibition at the Galleria La Tartaruga in Rome, Italy. It was through this exhibition that he first showed his "fake sculptures," a series of shaped-canvases that first appear to be solid sculptures but are actually paintings that present abstract forms suggesting animals, plants and landscapes. One of Pascali's "fake sculptures" was Decapitazione delle giraffe, or Decapitation of the giraffes. Here a structure of wood was created to resemble a skeleton which was then covered with canvas to represent skin. Other sculptures in this series included, Decapitazione della sculptura or Decapitation of the sculpture, (1966), and Mare or Sea, (1966). Pascali's other works involving canvas include Grande bacino di donna, mons Venus, (Large woman's pelvis, mons Venus) 1964, and Labbra rosse, (Red lips) 1964. These works were large flat canvases that became three-dimensional sculptures through the use of wooden structures, paint, and other materials, though they were still able to be hung on the wall. Many of these sculptures were references to popular culture of the time. Soon before, Pascali had created his "Armi series," or "Weaponry" (1965–66). Assembled from found materials and painted olive-green, these sculptures faithfully recreate every detail of the weapon it mimics. However, as the weapon cannot fire or kill, it becomes an innocent, oversized toy.

I was born in 1935. The first games I played were based most of all on war. My toys were piles of objects found in the house, which represented weapons. For example, a bean became a bullet, a broomstick and a box held together with a rubber band became a rifle, a rolled-up piece of paper tied to a stool was a cannon, a saucepan was a helmet, two pieces of wood nailed together were a sabre, three pieces of wood an aeroplane and so on. The way I played with other children was largely based on the war-heroism representation of the grown-ups (our fathers were at war)

The quote above by Pascali, shows the roots of the strong connection of these war items as toys to a strong war presence in his childhood.

Opposite to the "Armi series" in appearance, Pascali presented organic forms in a dream-like universe that, like the "fake sculptures," play on the relationship between illusion and reality.

Another famous sculpture by Pascali is the 32 m² di mare circa, or Approximately 32 m² of sea. Done in 1967 this sculpture consists of 30 shallow "trays" containing dyed blue water. These tiles were placed adjacently of the floor, except for 6 where a zig-zag path was created so that the viewer could walk through this "sea" that Pascali has created for them. This influence of the mirror-esque quality of water can be seen in his other works, Fiume, (River), Fiume con foce tripla, (River with triple estuary), Acque stagnanti, (Stagnant waters), and Canali d'irrigazione, (Irrigation canals).

== Art market ==
In 2016, Pascali's Code di Delfino (1996), a canvas on a wooden structure, was sold at Christie's London for a record £2.2million (£2.6 million with fees).
