= Ovidiu Maitec =

Romanian sculptor (1925–2007)

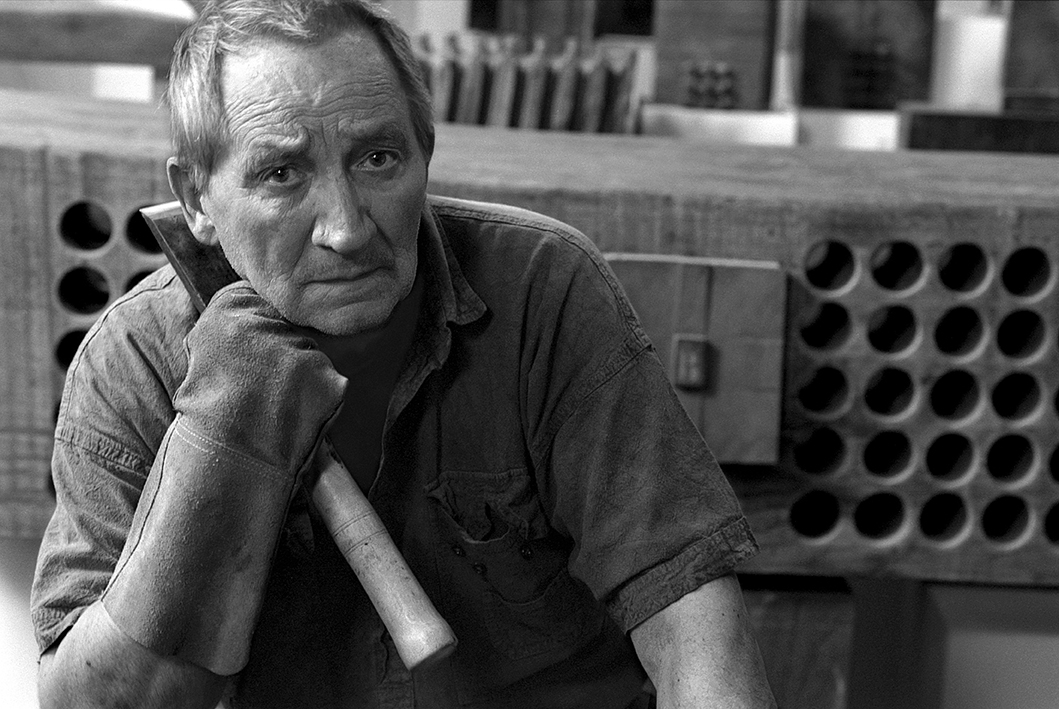
Ovidiu Maitec picture

Ovidiu Maitec (December 13, 1925–March 18, 2007) was a Romanian sculptor.

Born in Arad, he studied at the Bucharest Fine Arts Institute from 1945 to 1950. For several years he taught artistic anatomy at Bucharest's Nicolae Tonitza Fine Arts High School; meanwhile, from 1950 to 1956, he was teaching assistant at his alma mater. Numerous exhibitions devoted to Maitec's work were held both in Romania and abroad, and examples thereof are held by the Fonds national d'art contemporain and Tate. He was awarded the Romanian Academy prize in 1967, followed by the grand prize of the Fine Artists' Union in 1974, the Order of Cultural Merit in 1975 and the Order of Merit of the Italian Republic in 1985. Elected a corresponding member of the Romanian Academy in 1990, he was elevated to titular membership in 1999. In 2000 he was awarded the Order of the Star of Romania by then-President Emil Constantinescu. He died in Paris at age 81, and was buried at Bellu Cemetery in Bucharest.
