= Les femmes artistes d'Europe =

Temporary exhibition of women's art in Paris, 1937

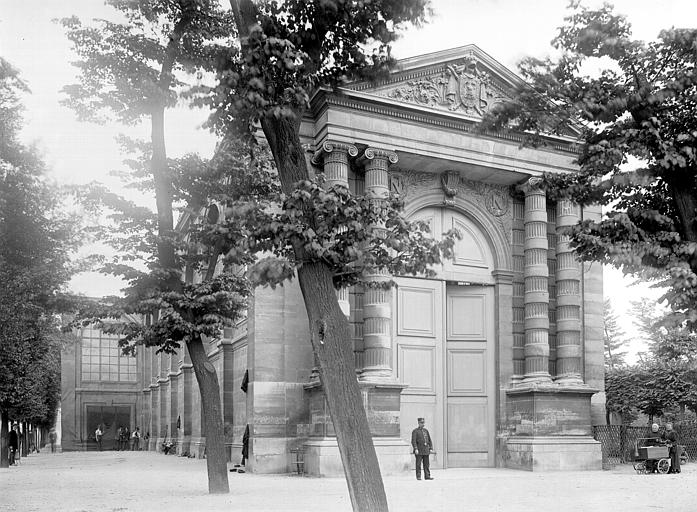
- Exterior of the Jeu de Paume museum
- Date: 11–28 February 1937
- Location: Jeu de Paume; 48.8659°N 2.324°E
- Theme: Exhibition of art by women
- Organised by: André Dezarrois; Antonietta Paoli Pogliani; Rose Valland; Marie-Anne Camax-Zoegger and others

Les femmes artistes d'Europe (Women Artists of Europe) was an exhibition held at the Jeu de Paume gallery (then the Museum of Contemporary Foreign Schools) in the Tuileries Gardens in Paris, France from 11 to 28 February 1937. This was the first exhibition in France devoted solely to women artists, concentrating on contemporary works. It featured 550 works by artists from 20 countries.

== Context ==
It was not until the very end of the 19th century that women benefited from the circuits of the art system, with studios, schools, galleries, salons, museums, newspapers, influential critics and collectors. In 1897, the École Nationale Supérieure des Beaux-Arts gradually began to open its doors to women, following the demands of sculptor Hélène Bertaux, founder of the Union of Women Painters and Sculptors. The Swedish painter, Hanna Hirsch-Pauli (1862–1940), had presented her work at the 1889 World's Fair in Paris and the French artist, Georges Achille-Fould (1865–1951), had exhibited at the 1900 World's Fair, also in Paris. In 1903, women were first allowed to compete for the Prix de Rome, a French government scholarship for arts students.

The period between the First and Second World Wars (1918–1939) was characterized by great contradictions for women. Legislative victories in matters of equality and suffrage were accompanied by a series of measures designed to maintain the role of women in society, in which their place was in the home, to give birth and raise children. Nevertheless, the period provided a favourable context for the promotion of women on the cultural scene. Professional societies were formed in Europe and the United States during the inter-war period to demand equality, representation, recognition, and professionalisation of women artists. These contradictions were reflected by the artists themselves. Some, like Marie Laurencin, Jacqueline Marval or Tamara de Lempicka, chose to be painters on the model of what was expected of a woman artist and agreed to work with colours and with so-called "feminine" subjects; others refused any categorization as a "woman artist".

== The exhibition ==
In 1937, two major events symbolised the promotion of women artists in France: the Women Artists of Europe exhibition in February, and the Exposition Internationale des Arts et Techniques dans la Vie Moderne (International Exhibition of Arts and Technology), also known as the 1937 World's Fair, from May to November, in which many women fulfilled commissions or exhibited. The February exhibition was co-chaired by André Dezarrois, curator of the Jeu de Paume, and Antonietta Paoli Pogliani, president of the International Committee of Fine Arts and the Women's Union of Liberal and Commercial Careers. The organizing committee included Rose Valland, curator at the Jeu de Paume, who would later be involved in protecting numerous Jewish-owned works of art during the Nazi occupation of France; photographer Laure Albin-Guillot; and artist Marie-Anne Camax-Zoegger, president of the Society of Modern Women Artists (FAM), founded in 1930. The exhibition moved to Prague in the summer of 1937, under the title Women Artists of Europe Exhibit at the Prague Exhibition. In October 1939, the Riverside Museum in New York opened an exhibition entitled International Women Painters, Sculptors, Gravers [of] Australia, Czechoslovakia, France, Greece, Hungary, Italy, the Netherlands, Norway, Poland, and Switzerland. Participation of European artists was organised by Pogliani. An exhibition of works by women artists of the magnitude of the Paris exhibition would not be held again until 1976, when the exhibition Women Artists: 1550-1950 was held in Los Angeles.

== The artists ==
Around 20 nations were represented. Pogliani, an Italian, was involved in the organization of the exhibition itself and many Italians exhibited, despite its fascist government under Mussolini. Nazi Germany and Spain, which was in the midst of a civil war, decided not to participate.

Opening with a retrospective devoted to artists who had died a few years earlier, the exhibition featured 550 works of painting, sculpture, decorative arts, drawings, engravings, and watercolours by over one hundred artists, including those already internationally renowned at the time: such as Vanessa Bell, Laurencin, Suzanne Valadon, Albin-Guillot, Adriana Pincherle, Lempicka, and Natalia Goncharova. They were organised by the nationality of the artist, with twelve countries represented. At the end of the display was an "international room" featuring artists from other countries, such as Russia, Japan, the USA, Greece, and also some German and Spanish artists. Here, all the artists, regardless of their nationality, exhibited together, and their names were listed alphabetically in the catalogue. These included Cecilia Beaux, Romaine Brooks, Alexandra Exter, and Gontcharova.

== Artists represented ==
Some of the artists represented were invited to take part in the exhibition, while others submitted their works for consideration by a jury. They included:

=== Retrospective exhibition ===
Marie Bashkirtseff (Russia, died 1884), María Blanchard (Spain, died 1932), Louise Catherine Breslau (Switzerland, died 1927), Mary Cassatt (American, died 1926), Lucie Cousturier, Julia Beatrice How, Jacqueline Marval, Berthe Morisot, Jane Poupelet and Vera Rockline (all French).

=== Belgium ===
Suzanne Cocq, Alice Frey, Lucie Jacquart, Mercédès Legrand, Éliane de Meuse, Jenny Montigny, Marguerite Putsage, Cécile Cauterman.

=== Czechoslovakia ===
Božena Jelínková-Jirásková, Charlotte Schrötter-Radnitz, Milada Špálová, Helena Šrámková, Sláva Tonderová-Zátková, Julie Winterová-Mezerová.

=== Finland ===
Ester Helenius, Sigrid Schauman, Helene Schjerfbeck, Essi Renvall.

=== France ===
- Émilie Charmy,
- Hermine David,
- Angèle Delasalle,
- Hélène Dufau,
- Louise Hervieu,
- Adrienne Jouclard,
- Marie Laurencin,
- Suzanne Lalique,
- Valentine Prax,
- Suzanne Valadon,
- Suzanne Duchamp,
- Marie-Louise Pichot
- Jeanne Bardey,
- Camille Claudel,
- Chana Orloff,
- Anna Quinquaud,
- Germaine Richier,
- Yvonne Serruys,
- Anna Bass,
- Laure Albin-Guillot,
- Guidette Carbonell,
- Paule Marrot

=== Hungary ===
Árkayné Sztehlo Lili, Mária Modok, Noémi Ferenczy, Anna Lesznai, Angéla Szuly, Margit Kovács, Elza Kövesházi-Kalmár, Alice Lux, Erzsébet Schaár.

=== Italy ===
Daphne Maugham Casorati, Leonor Fini, Pinetta Colonna Gamero, Elisabetta Keller, Paola Levi-Montalcini, Marisa Mori, Adriana Pincherle, Antonietta Paoli Pogliani, Anita Pittoni, Maria Signorelli.

=== Netherlands ===
Lizzy Ansingh, Jo Bauer-Stumpff, Else Berg, Jeanne Bieruma Oosting, Ina Hooft, Coba Ritsema, Jacoba Surie, Charley Toorop, Betsy Westendorp-Osieck, Charlotte van Pallandt, Gra Rueb, Henriëtte Vaillant.

=== Norway ===
Lilla Hellesen, Elisabetta Keller.

=== Poland ===
Zofia Albinowska-Minkiewiczowa, Hanna Nałkowska, Ludwika Nitschowa, Olga Boznańska, Stanisława Centnerszwerowa, Hanna Rudzka-Cybisowa, Pia Górska, Alice Halicka, Michalina Krzyżanowska, Tamara de Lempicka, Sonia Lewitska, Irena Lorentowicz, Maria Ewa Łunkiewicz-Rogoyska.

=== Romania ===
Ecaterina Delighioz, Micaela Eleutheriade, Olga Greceanu, Florența Pretorian, Elena Popea, Cecilia Cuțescu-Storck.

=== Sweden ===
Maj Bring, Mollie Faustman, Sigrid Hjertén, Tora Vega Holmström, Greta Knutson, Vera Nilsson, Siri Derkert.

=== Switzerland ===
Hanni Bay, Trudy Egender-Wintsch, Marguerite Frey-Surbek, Nanette Genoud, Marie Lotz, Esther Mengold, Martha Pfannenschmid,

=== United Kingdom ===
Vanessa Bell, Emily Beatrice Bland, Bessie Davidson, Cathleen Mann, Annie Swynnerton, Ethel Walker, Anna Zinkeisen.

=== Other countries ===
Cecilia Beaux (USA), Romaine Brooks (USA), Georgette Chen (Singapore), Suzanne Eisendieck (Germany), Alexandra Exter (Russia), Mariette Lydis (Austria), Maruja Mallo (Spain), Lilly Steiner (Austria), Rosario de Velasco (Spain).

== Bibliography ==
- Birbaum P., Women artists in interwar France. Framing feminities, Ashgate, 2011 ISBN 2-903639-72-8
- Bonnet M. J., Les femmes artistes dans les avant-gardes, Paris, Odile Jacob, 2006.
- Iamurri L., Spinazzé S. (sous la dir.), L’arte delle donne nell’Italia del Novecento, Rome, Meltemi, 2001.
- Gonnard C., Lebovici E., Femmes artistes / artistes femmes, Paris, Hazan, 2007.
- Sauer M., L’entrée des femmes à l’École des beaux arts, 1880–1923, Paris, École normale supérieure des beaux–arts, 1990.
- Trasforini M. A. (editor), Donne d’arte. Storie e generazioni, Rome, Meltemi, 2006.
- Perry G., Women artists and the Parisian avant-garde: Modernism and "feminine" art, 1900 to the late 1920s, Manchester, Manchester University Press, 1995.

== See also ==
- All I Want (art exhibition), exhibition of women's art held in Portugal in 2021.
- Twenty Six Contemporary Women Artists, art exhibition held in New York in 1971.
- Australian Exhibition of Women's Work, exhibition held in Melbourne in 1907
