= Marie Lotz =

Swiss painter and educator (1877–1970)

- Born: 6 November 1877; Basel, Switzerland
- Died: 13 October 1970 (aged 92); Birsfelden, Switzerland
- Known for: Paintings, watercolours

Marie Lotz (1877–1970), was a Swiss musician, educator, and painter, known in particular for her still lifes.

== Early life and education ==
Lotz was born 6 November 1877 in Basel in the canton of Basel-Stadt in Switzerland. Her parents were Johann Jakob Lotz and Maria, née Ecklin. Her father was a banker. Lotz attended the Basel Girls' School, passed the examination to become a teacher, and trained in piano and voice at the City of Basel Music Academy. For the next ten years she worked as a musician and piano teacher.

== Artistic career ==
From 1908, Lotz lived in Munich and studied at the art school of Moritz Heymann. Feeling patronized there, Lotz transferred to the art school in Dachau, where she was taught by the Austrian-German impressionist painter, Hans von Hayek. In 1910 and 1911 she spent some time at the Nagybánya artists' colony, which was then in eastern Hungary. In 1912, she lived in Paris, gaining experience in various studios. Between 1913 and 1920, she lived in Basel, working as a freelance artist, and from 1920 until 1924 in Clausthal-Zellerfeld in the Upper Harz Mountains in Germany. She then returned to Switzerland, penniless, and settled in Birsfelden.

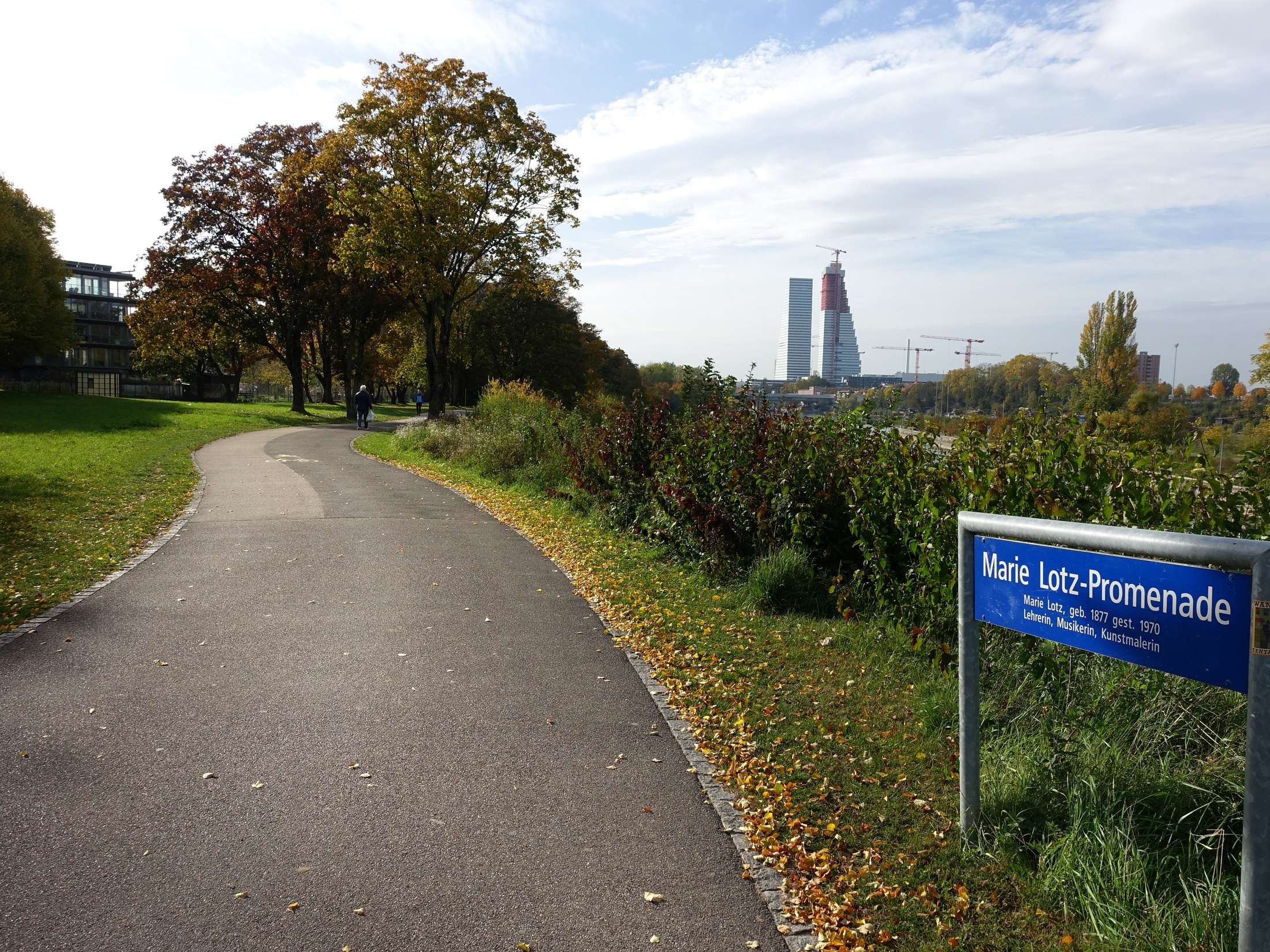
Path named after Lotz in Birsfelden

With the support of friends, Lotz was able to establish a relatively secure livelihood as a visual artist. She did both paintings and watercolours, concentrating on still lifes, especially flowers, but also doing portraits and some landscapes. She exhibited her works from the late 1920s to the 1950s in Swiss galleries including the Kunsthalle Bern, Kunsthalle Basel, Kunstmuseum Basel, and the Kunsthaus Zürich, as well as at Schloss Ebenrain near Basel. In Switzerland she exhibited at shows specifically devoted to women's art and in February 1937, together with other Swiss artists such as Hanni Bay, Trudy Egender-Wintsch, Marguerite Frey-Surbek, Nanette Genoud, Esther Mengold and Martha Pfannenschmid, she was among those to exhibit at Les femmes artistes d'Europe, the first international all-woman art exhibition in France, held at the Jeu de Paume in Paris. In her later years, she taught art at the Free Evangelical School in Basel.

== Death ==
Lotz died in Birsfelden on 13 October 1970. In 2005 a path along the River Rhine in Birsfelden was named after her, as the Marie Lotz-Promenade. That same year Birsfelden was awarded a prize given to municipalities that named geographic features after female figures.
