= Ecaterina Delighioz =

Romanian artist (1901–1973?)

- Born: 1901; Tulcea, Romania
- Died: 1973 (aged 71–72); Bucharest, Romania
- Known for: Painting

Ecaterina Delighioz (née Cristescu, 1901–1973?) was a Romanian artist and art teacher, known for her paintings of landscapes, still lifes and female nudes.

== Early life and education ==
Although the work of Delighioz is still widely available on art markets, little is known about her early life. She was born in Tulcea, Romania in 1901 but the precise date appears to be unavailable. In 1919 she attended the first six-week summer school of the Free School of Painting at the Romanian Painters Colony in Baia Mare in Romania, where she was guided by the painter and teacher, Ipolit Strâmbu, and the Hungarian painter, János Thorma. This summer school was open to students of Romanian art schools and of the National School of Fine Arts in Bucharest. It appears that her work was first exhibited in an exhibition at the Free School of Painting, which included works by Strâmbu as well as some of her contemporaries, such as Micaela Eleutheriade and Alexandru Phoebus. She graduated from the school of fine arts in Bucharest in 1925, having received tuition from Strâmbu, George Demetrescu Mirea, Cecilia Cuţescu-Storck, and Dimitrie Serafim.

== Artistic career ==
Delighioz taught art at the Spiru Haret Dobrujan College in her home town of Tulcea. From 1933 until 1946 she exhibited actively in the official salons in Bucharest, being considered as a prominent representative of the women's artistic movement in interwar Romania. An important early work was Lady with a Fan (1936), probably commissioned, which shows strong evidence of the influence of Ipolit Strâmbu. It is a figurative composition depicting a young woman in what is clearly a wealthy home. This painting was acquired by the County Museum of Art of Baia Mare in 2014. In 1937, she participated in the exhibition called Les femmes artistes d'Europe, the first international all-woman art show in France, held at the Jeu de Paume in Paris. From her paintings, we know that she also visited Venice.

== Death ==
Delighioz died in 1973 in Bucharest. Her work is held by the Năsui Collection & Archives in Bucharest, by the County Museum of Art of Baia Mare, and elsewhere. Most recently, her work has been exhibited at a group exhibition called Cats are taking over, held in 2025 at Vila Catena in Bucharest.
