= Jacquart =

Jacquart is a surname. Notable people with the surname include:

- Beatrice Jacquart (1911–1990), American politician
- Lucie Jacquart (1882–1956), Belgian artist
