= Florența Pretorian =

Romanian artist (1896–1971)

- Born: 7 February 1902; Padea, Dolj County, Kingdom of Romania
- Died: 1 October 1948 (aged 46); Bucharest, Romanian People's Republic
- Education: National School of Fine Arts, 1924; Académie Scandinave, 1932
- Occupations: Painter; calligrapher; art teacher
- Movement: Post-Impressionism

Florența Pretorian (Note: Anglicised as Florence Pretorian) (7 February 1902 – 1 October 1948) was a Romanian painter, calligrapher, and art teacher. A member of the Romanian avant-garde, Pretorian was a representative of the Post-Impressionist art movement.

== Early life and education ==
Pretorian was born on 7 February 1902 in the village of Padea, south of Craiova. Between 1920 and 1924, she attended the National School of Fine Arts in the capital of Romania, Bucharest. There, she studied with Ipolit Strâmbu, best known for his paintings of women, and the impressionist painter, Dimitrie Serafim. In 1922, 1923, 1924, 1926, and 1930, she attended the free school at Baia Mare in Maramureș, Romania, under the guidance of the Hungarian painter, János Thorma. In 1929 and 1930, she travelled to Italy, including Venice, the Netherlands and France, and in 1931 and 1932, she attended the private Académie Scandinave in Maison Watteau, Montparnasse, Paris, studying under Othon Friesz, Charles Dufresne and Henry de Waroquier.

== Artistic and teaching career ==
In Bucharest, Pretorian joined the Association of Women Painters and Sculptors and her work was regularly exhibited at that association's exhibitions, at the Official Salon in Bucharest from 1927 until her death in 1948, and also at several Autumn Salons. She also exhibited outside Bucharest in locations such as Craiova, Braşov, and Constanţa. Pretorian had her first solo exhibition in Bucharest in 1927. From 1930 she exhibited regularly in Paris, particularly at the Autumn Salon held at the Grand Palais and at the Salon des Tuileries. In 1937, she showed at the exhibition called Les femmes artistes d'Europe, the first international all-woman art show in France, held at the Jeu de Paume in Paris.

Between 1924 and 1928, Pretorian taught drawing and calligraphy at Ion Maiorescu High School at Giurgiu in southern Romania. In 1935, she published Free Drawing and New Methods, a teaching manual with her own illustrations.

== Death and legacy ==
Pretorian died in a fire in her studio in Bucharest on 1 October 1948. Despite her short life, she had been a prolific artist and many of her works remain available for purchase. Others have only recently been discovered, such as a notebook with sketches from her travels through Romania in 1926–27. Several retrospective exhibitions have been held since her death, notably a solo exhibition held in the National Museum of Art of Romania in 1975 and as part of an exhibition called Art and Feminism in Modern Romania in 2016–17 at the same location. Her works have been shown frequently in the County Museum of Art in Baia Mare.
