= Society of Modern Women Artists =

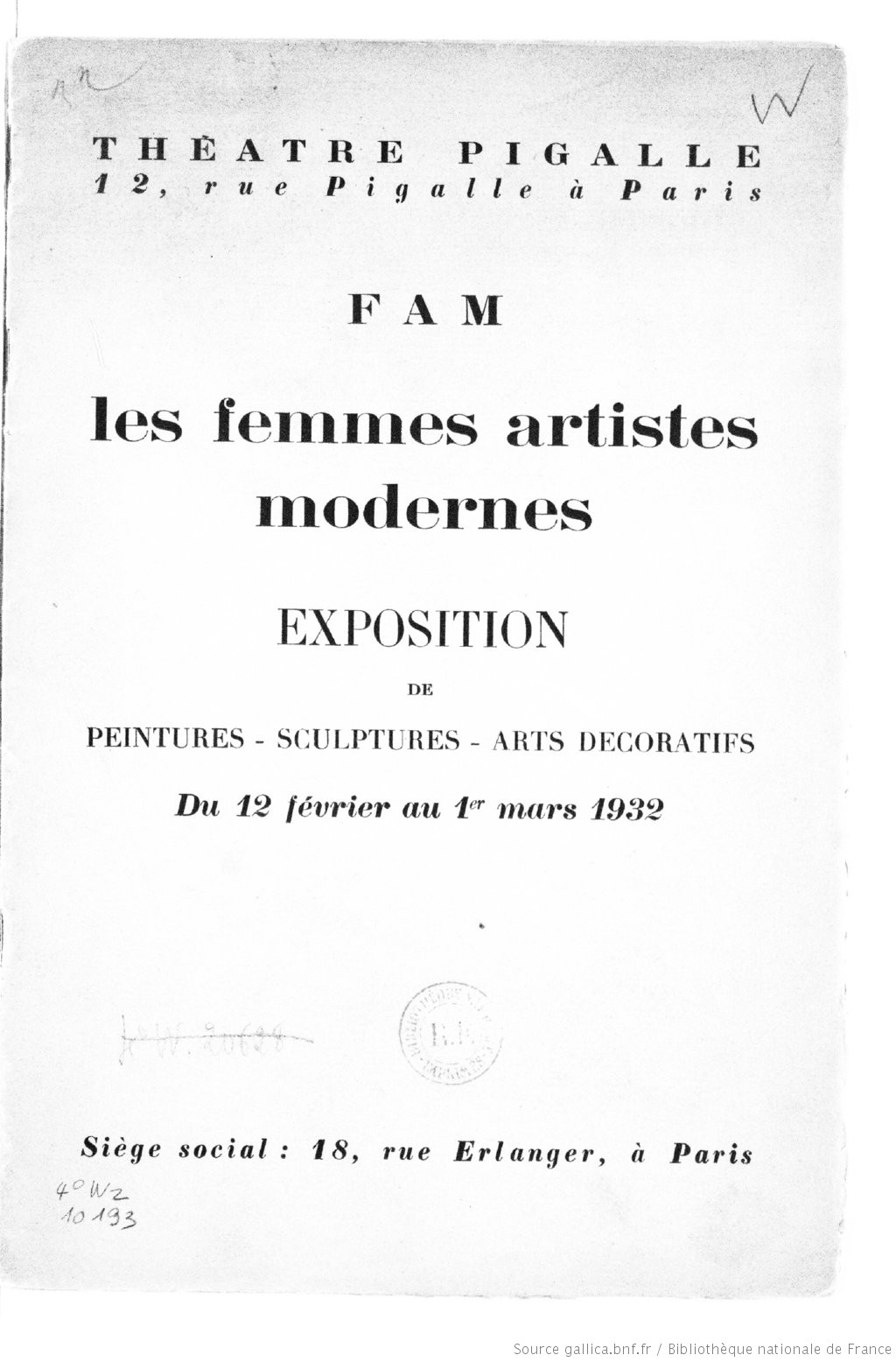
A catalogue for their 1932 Paris exhibition

The Society of Modern Women Artists (La Société des femmes artistes modernes, FAM) was created in Paris in 1930 as an association for modern women artists. They organized an annual salon from 1931 to 1938. Through these exhibitions they showed modern works of art by French and international women artists, to establish the presence of women in art and to gain recognition from the general public. FAM's exhibitions are considered "a significant force towards putting women artists on a more equal footing" with male artists in France.

== Founding ==
The society was founded by Marie-Anne Camax-Zoegger in 1930. From 1931 to 1938, the society organized an annual exhibition, held in various places such as the Galerie de la Maison de France on the Champs-Elysées the Bernheim-Jeune gallery, the Pavillon des Expositions Temporaires (on the Esplanade des Invalides) of the Exposition Internationale des Arts et Techniques dans la Vie Moderne and the Petit Palais. Bessie Davidson was the group's vice-president from 1930 to 1936, Louise Germain was its treasurer and Émilie Charmy its secretary.

== Participants ==
The Society of Modern Women Artists presented and defended the artistic work of over 100 female artists including recent immigrants to Paris from countries such as Argentina, Australia, Poland, Russia and Turkey. In contrast to the older Union of Women Painters and Sculptors and Syndicat des Femmes Artistes Peintres et Sculpteurs, the Society explicitly sought out modern artists: "In forming the Femmes Artistes Modernes, I was attempting to present a group of artists truly committed to our great modern art from our modest, feminine cadre." (trans.)

Suzanne Valadon participated in the group, as did Marie Laurencin; Fernande Cormier; Suzanne Duchamp; Chériane (wife of Léon-Paul Fargue); Louise Ibels (sister of Henri Gabriel Ibels); Paule Gobillard (niece of Berthe Morisot); Hermine David; Marthe Lebasque; Louise Hervieu; the Russian Chana Orloff; Jeanne Bergson; Jeanne Bardey; Tamara de Lempicka; Mariette Lydis, Yvonne Serruys; Mela Muter; Jane Poupelet; Anna Bass; and Clémentine-Hélène Dufau.

A number of artists were featured in retrospective exhibitions. A retrospective of the works of the Spanish Maria Blanchard, Jane Poupelet, and Jacqueline Marval was held in 1932. In 1934, Marie Bracquemond and Camille Claudel were the focus of an exhibition. In 1935, the works of American Mary Cassatt were featured. Between 1935 and 1938, Jeanne Bieruma Oosting was the only Dutch artist who participated within the FAM-exhibitions.

== Values ==
Members of the Society dealt with issues of gender, sexuality, motherhood, race, ethnicity and nationalism, presenting a variety of viewpoints through their work. Camax-Zoegger championed women artists with a diversity of experiences and artistic expression, emphasizing that women artists should be treated seriously and equally with men.

At the same time, Camax-Zoegger continued to endorse many traditional social values. She often gave prominent positions in the Society's shows to interwar imagery promoting motherhood and large families. Publicly, Camax-Zoegger sought to reconcile images of womanhood: of woman as working artist and woman as mother, referencing a long history of women artists whose children had been their frequent models, and asserting that art and motherhood were not opposed.

"Maternity and art are two different things that do not detract from one another. There are very important women artists who are not married, and there are others who are married and who are admirable mothers. I believe that the more a woman is cultured, the more she is able to raise children. Maternity does not diminish her art, and art does not suffer one bit from the experience of mothering." (trans.)

== Influence ==
In part because of its accommodation of traditional values, the Society received support from politicians and men of letters including Georges Huisman, Adrien Berthod, Anatole de Monzie, Gustave Kahn, and Paul Valéry. The 1938 Salon opened at the Charpentier gallery at 76 rue du Faubourg Saint Honoré. Louis Vauxcelles wrote of it in Le Monde illustré, commending Camax-Zoegger for her tireless work in gathering together an extensive group of women artists of the highest quality. Albert Lebrun, President of the Republic, and Jean Zay, Minister of National Education and Fine Arts, visited the salon on March 19, 1938. Historian Marie-Jo Bonnet emphasizes the importance of this event and the recognition that was accorded to the work of more than sixty modern women artists, whose collective work presented a vital and different perspective.

In spite of its successful organization of major women-only exhibitions in the 1930s, the Society of Modern Women Artists ceased activities in the period leading up to World War II. It did not resume operations following the war.
