= Micaela Eleutheriade =

Romanian artist (1900–1982)

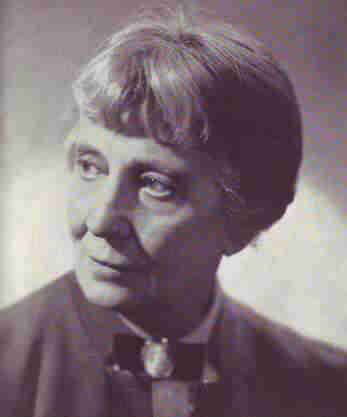
- Born: 17 June 1900; Bucharest, Romania
- Died: 11 December 1982 (aged 82); Bucharest
- Known for: Painting
- Relatives: Gheorghe Tattarescu

Micaela Eleutheriade (1900–1982) was a noted Romanian painter and engraver. She was a descendant, through her mother, of the painter Gheorghe Tattarescu, the pioneer of neoclassicism in Romania.

== Early life and education ==
Eleutheriade was born in Bucharest, capital of Romania, on 17 June 1900. She attended primary and secondary school in Bucharest and, between 1918 and 1924, studied at the National School of Fine Arts in Bucharest, co-founded by Tattarescu and another artist, Theodor Aman. She had Cecilia Cuțescu-Storck, Dimitrie Mirea and Ipolit Strâmbu among her teachers at the school. She then moved to Paris to attend the Académie Ranson between 1924 and 1927, under the guidance of Roger Bissière.

== Artistic career ==
Eleutheriade first exhibited in 1926, at the Salon des Independants in Paris and at the "Spring Salon" in Bucharest, on both occasions with the canvas Still Life with Hat. She won the Official Salon Prize in Bucharest in 1931. This was followed by her first solo exhibition at the Dalles Hall of the Romanian Athenaeum in 1936, as well as other group exhibitions, with her work rapidly becoming very popular. In 1937, she exhibited in the exhibition called Les femmes artistes d'Europe, the first international all-woman art show in France, held at the Jeu de Paume in Paris.

In 1959, a retrospective of her work was held at the exhibition pavilions in Herăstrău Park, and in 1965 she participated in the annual graphics exhibition at the Simu Hall in Bucharest. Her work was also exhibited in thematic exhibitions, such as "Impressions from France and Italy" (1969) and "Impressions from England, Germany, Austria, and the Netherlands" (1972). She contributed works to Romanian art exhibitions in Bern, Prague, Stockholm, Warsaw, Belgrade, Paris, and Tel Aviv. Her work included still lifes, landscapes, paintings derived from folk art, portraits and nudes. She also created decorative art on glass or Plexiglas. Among those with whom she exhibited was Milița Petrașcu, considered the most talented woman sculptor in Romania at that time.

Using a vibrant colour palette, she is considered to have been an impressionist or post-impressionist, with her work having been said to have had influences from Paul Cézanne and Georges Braque. Over time, it evolved from baroque-style lyricism to a modern expression with a deep observation of reality. Her paintings have been said to exude optimism, candour and a restrained joy of living, without losing the essential elegance of the expression. Overall, her work is considered to have offered broad observations about the world and the human condition.

== Death and legacy ==
Eleutheriade died on 11 December 1982 in Bucharest. She bequeathed most of her works to the National Museum of Art of Romania. In recognition of her status, the Union of Visual Artists of Romania (UAPR) established the Micaela Eleutheriade Scholarship, funded by the National Museum, which consists of providing an apartment in central Bucharest for two years to the scholarship holder, to be used as a studio for artistic creation. This scholarship is awarded through a public competition to a graduate of painting or graphics under 35 years of age. Her work continues to be exhibited, and a posthumous retrospective exhibition, called Miraculous Healings was held at the Bucharest Municipal Museum in 2015.
