= Charlotte Schrötter-Radnitz =

Czech-Italian painter (1899–1986)

- Born: Charlotte Radnitz; 18 April 1899; Prague, Bohemia, Austria-Hungary
- Died: 1986; Venice, Italy
- Known for: Painting
- Spouse(s): 1. Richard Schrötter; 2. Guido Ehrenfreund-Frumi

Charlotte Schrötter-Radnitz (also known as Lotte Radnitz-Schroetterová and as Lotte Frumi; 18 April 1899 – 1986) was a Czech-Italian painter.

== Early life ==
Radnitz was born on 18 April 1899 in the Nové Město area of Prague in Bohemia, Austria-Hungary. Her father was Otto Radnitz, the manager of a sugar factory, and her mother was Marta (née Mozes). She had two sisters and a brother, one of the sisters being Gerty Cori who, in 1947, was the third woman to win a Nobel Prize in science.

Radnitz studied at the Academy of Fine Arts in Prague from 1919 to 1922 under the artist and professor, Franz Thiele. She married the painter Richard Schrötter and lived with him in Venice in the mid-1920s and, in 1926, they both represented Czechoslovakia at the Venice Biennale. Also in the 1920s, she spent time in Paris, being in contact with the artists Maurice Utrillo and Chaïm Soutine, as well as with the Italian bohemian movement in Montparnasse known as Les Italiens de Paris. In 1925 and 1926, she studied for a master's degree at the Berlin Academy of Arts. After getting divorced, in 1929 she married Guido Ehrenfreund (1868–1961), a Venetian lawyer who, amongst other activities, had been an early pioneer of motor racing at the turn of the century. Together, they Italianized their surname to Frumi.

== Career ==
Much of the work by Radnitz has been lost, first as a result of World War II and later during floods in Venice. Her work from 1924–1928 is known in part only from reproductions in periodical journals. She was mainly interested in figure painting, portraits, urban landscapes and still lifes. In 1928, a monographic study of her was published in the journal Deutsche Kunst und Dekoration. A few of her paintings from that period can be found in the National Gallery Prague and in the Jewish Museum in Prague. Charlotte Radnitz's paintings from the 1920s are at a first glance different from the production of her German-speaking peers in Prague, due to the influence of extensive travels through Italy. Their style is closer to the circle of Italian artists influenced by the magazine Valori Plastici. An important influence on her work was the Austrian painter, Oskar Kokoschka.

Radnitz was one of the founding members of the artists' groups in Prague known as Junge Kunst (Young Art: 1927–1928) and Prager Secession, or "Prague's Secession", which was one of the most influential artistic groups for German-speaking artists in Czechoslovakia. It was established in 1928 as a follow-up to an earlier Junge Kunst exhibition. Between 1929 and 1937, it organized nine showings, which were generally well received. The members, who were not allowed to join other artistic groups, tended to be withdrawing from the prevailing styles common at that time, such as expressionism, surrealism and abstract art, preferring a neorealistic style. They group openly stood against Nazism and Nazi Germany.

Among the founding members, including Radnitz, were several influential women artists, such as the sculptor Mary Duras, who was a member of the jury and also of the managing board. Other founding members were the painter Grete Passer and the sculptor Gabriele Waldert, one of the first women (together with Duras) to study at the Prague Academy of Arts with the noted sculptor Jan Štursa.

In 1937, already established as an artist of note, she was among those to exhibit in Les femmes artistes d'Europe, the first international all-woman art show in France, held at the Jeu de Paume in Paris in February. During World War II, after learning that her mother had been sent to a concentration camp, Radnitz left Venice and moved into hiding in Tuscany along with other Jewish people, including the art critic Bernard Berenson. Many of her works were lost at that time. In 1945, she returned to Venice, exhibiting in the 1948 Biennale. During this period, she devoted herself primarily to portraits, including ones of her mother and sisters Hilda and Gerty, as well as to landscapes. After her husband's death in 1961, she became friends with the American poet Ezra Pound. In 1966, many of her works were destroyed by floods in Venice.

== Death and legacy ==
Radnitz lived until her death in the Palazzo Falier on the Grand Canal in Venice. She died in 1986 and was buried in the San Michele Cemetery. Some of her surviving works are held by the Venetian Committee of the Dante Alighieri Society, as a result of a donation prior to her death. Several were exhibited in 2013 at an exhibition in Padua, Italy entitled Female Judaism: Eight Women Artists of the Twentieth Century. Other paintings are held by the Jewish Museum in Prague and by National Gallery Prague.

== Sources ==
- Michaela Krčmová, Lotte Frumi: Pražská malířka v Benátkách, 352 s., nakl. Prostor, 2026
- Habánová A (ed.), 2013, Mladí lvi v kleci, OG Liberec, GVU Cheb, Nakl. Arbor vitae, Řevnice, ISBN 978-80-7467-025-1 (Arbor vitae), ISBN 978-80-85050-99-8 (OGL)
- Rousová H (ed.), 1994, Mezery v historii 1890–1938: polemický duch střední Evropy, Češi, Němci, Židé, kat. 142 s., GHMP, NG, Praha ISBN 80-7010-030-3
- Habán I, 2012, Fenomén německo-českého výtvarného umění 20. století (Die Pilger, Junge Kunst, Prager Secession. Pražská scéna a paralelní centra německy hovořících umělců v meziválečném Československu, Disertační práce, SDU, FF MUNI, Brno
- Výtvarní umělci Přerova 1900–2010, Daněk L. a kol., 2009, Galia Olomouc, ISBN 978-80-904352-1-6
