= Alice Lux =

Hungarian sculptor (1906–1988)

Gregersenné Lux Alice
- Lux in 1981
- Born: Lux Alice; 23 October 1906; Bustyaháza, Kingdom of Hungary
- Died: 21 August 1988 (aged 81); Budapest, Hungary
- Known for: Sculpture
- Spouse: Hugó Gregersen
- Relatives: Lux Elek

Alice Lux (1906–1988) was a Hungarian sculptor, known for her free-standing sculptures and for reliefs that decorated buildings designed by her architect husband Hugó Gregersen.

== Early life and education ==
Lux was born on 23 October 1906 in Bustyaháza, which at the time was part of the Máramaros County of the Kingdom of Hungary, but is now in Ukraine, where it is known as Bushtyno. Her uncle was the sculptor, Lux Elek, who taught her when she studied, between 1926 and 1931, at the Hungarian Royal National School of Arts and Crafts, now incorporated into the Moholy-Nagy University of Art and Design. At the time, the school was influenced by the Arts and Crafts movement that had begun in the British Isles and spread to the rest of Europe. Her first exhibition was in the Hungarian capital, Budapest. She then went to Rome on a study visit and in 1932 her work was exhibited at La Esposizione d’arte della giovanezza fascista romana (Exhibition of Roman fascist youth).

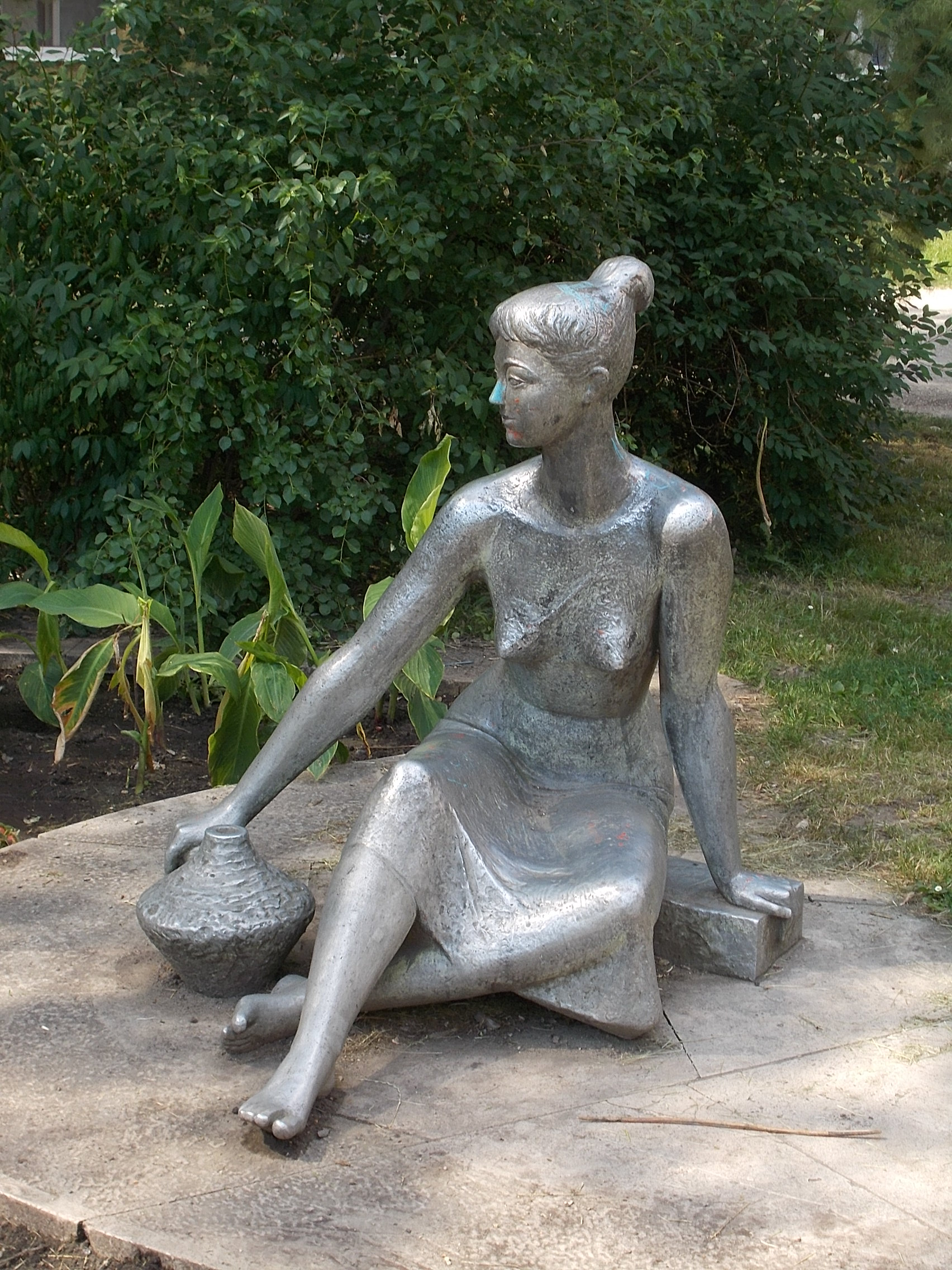
Girl with a Jug

== Career ==
Lux created classicist and decorative sculptures, and small sculptures, working with a range of materials including stone, aluminium, and clay. She received five awards from various exhibitions between 1934 and 1940: a gold medal at the Brussels International Exposition (1935); two gold medals and one silver medal at the Exposition Internationale des Arts et Techniques dans la Vie Moderne, held in Paris in 1937; and a gold medal at the Triennale di Milano in Milan in 1940. She participated in other exhibitions in Hungary in the same period and also in Les femmes artistes d'Europe, the first international all-woman art show in France, held at the Jeu de Paume in Paris in 1937.

She married Hugó Gregersen and used the names G. Lux Alice or Gregersenné Lux Alice. She sculpted reliefs on a number of buildings her husband designed, including in Dereglye Street on the Buda side of the Danube in Budapest, and on the Gubacsi housing estate, on the facades of a school building on Újvidék Square, and on Bem József Street 24, all in Budapest. Several of her earlier works were tombstones and, much later, she would sculpt a tombstone for herself and her husband, who died in 1975. Notable among her outdoor sculptures is the aluminium Girl with a Jug, to be found in Oroszlány in the Komárom-Esztergom County of Hungary. Four of her works were placed in the headquarters of the Hungarian General Credit Bank in Debrecen.

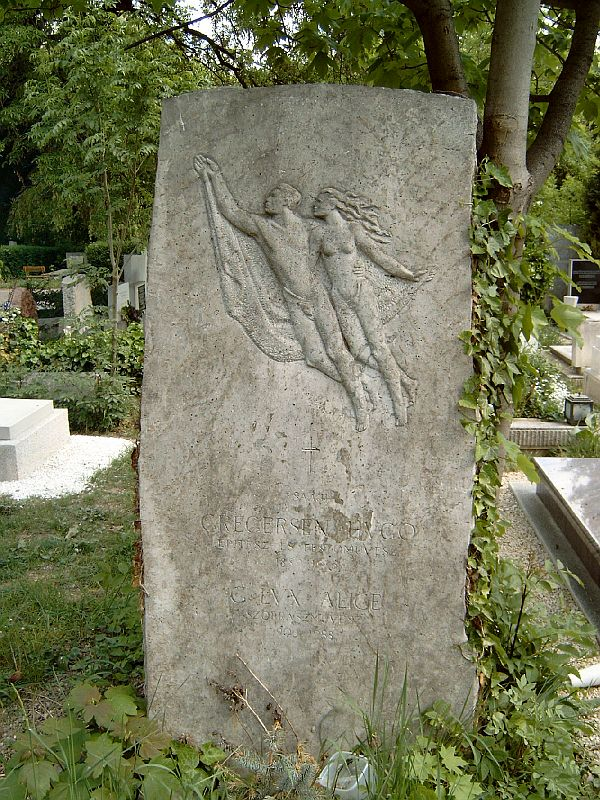
Tombstone of Lux and her husband

Lux returned to exhibiting in 1951, taking part in the annual Hungarian Fine Art Exhibitions held at the Hall of Art, Budapest. She continued to work until after 1977, when she finalized a tombstone for the Hungarian opera singer, Losonczy György. Her last recorded exhibition was in 1968.

== Death ==
Lux died on 21 August 1988. She was buried with her husband in the Farkasréti Cemetery in Budapest (Plot 35–5–73).
