= Marie-Louise Pichot =

French impressionist painter

- Born: 1885
- Died: 1947 (aged 61–62)
- Movement: Impressionism

Marie-Louise Pichot (French: [maʁi lwiz piʃo]; 1885–1947) was a French Impressionist painter.

== Biography ==
Marie-Louise Pichot was a well-known artist from the Montmartre district. She was inspired by the work of the impressionists, and focuses mainly through her works on representations of the female body, nude or still life painting.

In February 1937, she took part in the collective exhibition Les femmes artistes d'Europe organized at the Jeu de Paume, honoring the works of contemporary women artists across Europe.
