= Victor Surbek =

Swiss painter (1885–1975)

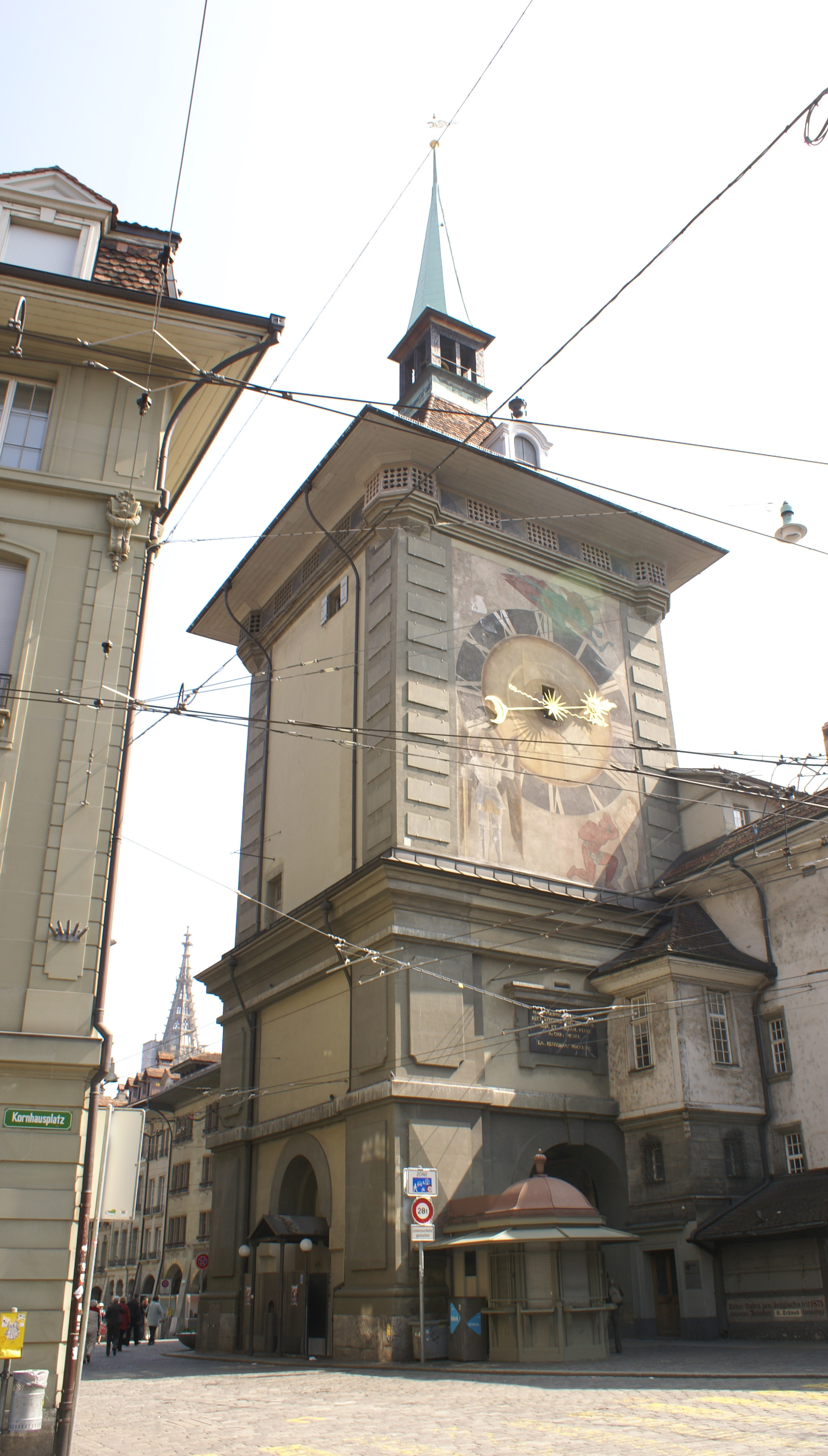
Surbek's most prominent work, the 1929 fresco Beginning of Time on the Zytglogge in Bern

.

Victor Surbek (1885–1975) was a Swiss painter from Bern.

After studies in Italy, Germany (Kunstgewerbeschule München, Kunstgewerbeschule Karlsruhe) and Paris (Académie de la Grande Chaumière), he married fellow painter Marguerite Frey-Surbek in 1914 and operated a painting school with her up until 1931. Surbek travelled widely and displayed his works at numerous expositions after 1905. In 1964, he and his wife set up a foundation to care for his works and archives in Spiez.

Much influenced by Hodler, Surbek was a typical representative of Swiss figurative art. His very extensive work includes mainly landscapes, but also detail studies, portraits and still lifes.
