= Fernande Cormier =

French woman painter

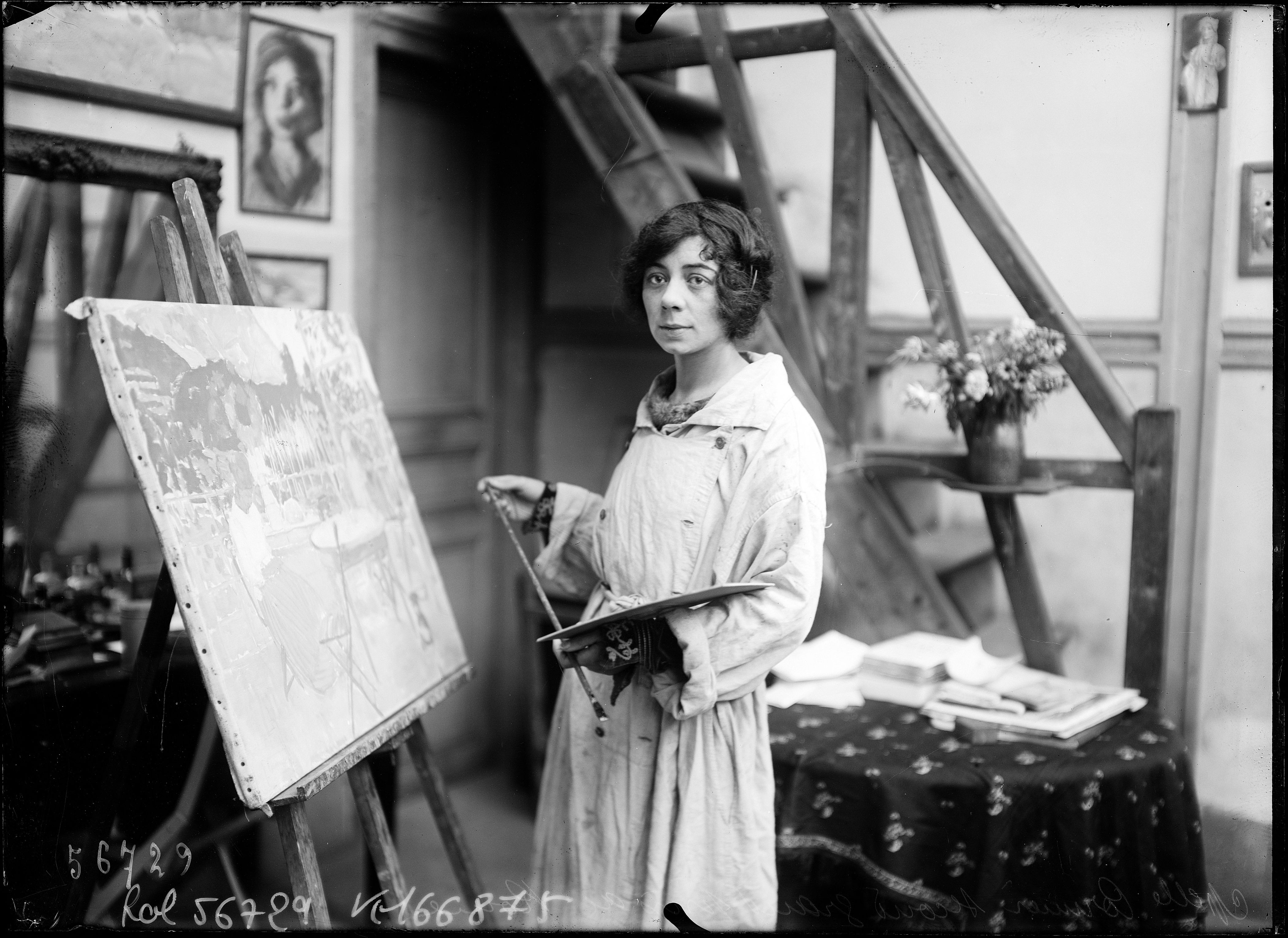
Fernande Cormier, 1919

Fernande Victoire Cormier, born on 17 November 1888 in Toulon and died on 15 August 1964 in Sanary-sur-Mer, was a French painter.

== Biography ==
Born on 17 November 1888 in Toulon, Fernande Cormier studied under Ferdinand Humbert and Émile Renard. She exhibited from 1913 onwards at the Salon des artistes français in Paris (of which she was a member), winning a silver medal and a travel grant in 1920, at the Salon d'automne from 1919 to 1926 and at the Salon des Tuileries in 1927.

She was second grand prix de Rome in 1919. She also participated in the exhibitions of the Society of Modern Women Artists in 1935-1936 and 1938. She traveled to Fez and exhibited her Moroccan paintings in 1926.

Linked to Provence her native region, she made sets for the foyer of the Toulon Opera: in her painting of the Foyer Campra at the Opera, she depicts Massenet's Poème pastoral with a view of the Siou-Blanc plateau, a mountainous massif in the south-western part of the Var department. The subject, painted around 1922, has a symbolist influence.

She also made sets for the town hall of Vincennes around 1932–1935.

There is truth and accent in Miss Fernande Cormier's portraits.

— Alfred Louis Edmond Vallette

== List of works ==
- Le collier de jasmin, oil on canvas, 64 x 55 cm.
- Le sculpteur, oil on canvas, 135 x 105 cm.
- Les pins, 72 x 85 cm.
- Femme marocaine dans son intérieur
- Bateaux dans la baie, oil on canvas, 43 x 53 cm.
- Le chat qui dort, oil on canvas, 61 × 50 cm, Gray (Haute-Saône), Musée Baron-Martin.
- Café en Sidi Bou Saïd, oil on canvas, 80 x 100 cm.
- Portrait de jeune homme à son bureau, oil on canvas, 80 x 64 cm.
