= Angéla Szuly =

Hungarian artist (1893–1976)

- Born: Szuly, Angéla; 6 September 1893; Budapest, Hungary
- Died: 4 July 1976 (aged 82); Budapest
- Known for: Painting
- Movement: Neo-impressionism

Angéla Szuly (1893 –1976) was a Hungarian painter and art teacher.

== Early life and studies ==
Szuly was born in Budapest, Hungary on 6 September 1893 (some sources say 1899). She completed her studies at the Budapest Academy of Fine Arts in 1924, studying painting and drawing under the guidance of Oszkár Glatz and then István Réti. Between 1922 and 1924, she worked in the summer at the Pécs Artists' Colony under the direction of István Csók and in 1925, she was a student at the Nagybánya Free School. She also visited the Miskolc Artists' Colony and, as a student there, participated in the Ernst Museum's group exhibition in Budapest in 1923, receiving the Helikon Prize for one of her paintings. As a student, she had won the Szinyei Merse Prize, named after the Hungarian artist, Pál Szinyei Merse. She participated in the exhibitions of the Hungarian National Salon from 1920, and held her first solo exhibition there in 1927.

== Artistic career ==
In 1928, Szuly founded the Miskolc Artists' Society. In the same year, she went on a study trip to Dresden and Munich in Germany. From 1930 she was painting regularly in the town of Szentendre. In 1934 she visited Florence and Venice in Italy. In 1937 she was in Paris, where her work was chosen to be part of the Les femmes artistes d'Europe, the first exhibition in France devoted solely to the work of women.

Szuly's art was primarily inspired by living in Nagybánya and Szentendre, being characterised by lush vegetation. She was also influenced by impressionism, neo-impressionism, expressionism, and fauvism, as well as the works of Paul Cézanne and Henri Matisse. She was a regular member of the Hungarian Association of Women Artists from 1931. In the same year, she founded the New Group of the Association together with twelve colleagues. Eight of these, known as the "New Eight", exhibited at the National Salon in October 1931, receiving some criticism from the conservative art press and viewing public. Nevertheless, in the following years she took part in several joint exhibitions with the group, both in Hungary, including the 1938 Hungarian Women Artists' Jubilee Exhibition, and elsewhere, such as in Warsaw in 1934, at an Anglo-Hungarian women's art exhibition in London in 1938 and at the Riverside Museum in New York in 1939.

== Later life ==
Little is known about Szuly's artistic career after the outbreak of World War II. At some stage she became an art teacher at the Batthyány Lajos Primary School in Budapest. In 1962, she was part of a group exhibition at the Ernst Museum.

== Death ==
Szuly died on 4 July 1976 in Budapest. Her work can be found in the Ferenczy Museum in Szentendre and in the Hungarian National Gallery.
