= Marie-Anne Camax-Zoegger =

French artist (1881–1952)

- Born: Julie Marie Anne Zoegger; 7 December 1881; Paris, France
- Died: 31 October 1952 (aged 70); Paris, France
- Known for: Painting, mainly still lifes and landscapes
- Spouse: Alfred Camax
- Parent(s): Antoine Zoegger, father

Marie-Anne Camax-Zoegger (1881–1952) was a French painter known for her use of colour and the founder of the Society of Modern Women Artists (FAM) in France.

== Early life ==
Born as Julie Marie Anne Zoegger on 7 December,1881 in the 8th arrondissement of Paris, she was the daughter of Antoine Zoegger, a sculptor and decorator from Alsace, who had worked with the noted architect Eugène Viollet-le-Duc and with the painter Jean-Jacques Henner. After her father's death, when she was only four years old, Henner encouraged the development of her artistic talents. She was one of the first women to attend the École des Beaux-Arts in Paris, which had just opened its doors to women, studying with the painter Ferdinand Humbert. She first participated in the Salon of the Société Nationale des Beaux-Arts in March 1909, taking part in a women's exhibition at the Grand Palais in Paris, which was incorporated into the larger men's exhibition. In June 1910, she married Alfred Camax, whose social and financial standing allowed her to devote herself to art. They had five children.

== Career ==
Zoegger's artistic works include portraits, still lifes, and landscapes. She often painted outdoors, capturing the beauty of places such as Le Pouldu in Brittany and her family's estate in Etréchy. Her children, especially her daughters, frequently served as models, and themes of motherhood and childhood are common in her work. Admitted to the Société Nationale des Beaux-Arts in 1922, some of Zoegger's works were purchased by the State for museums (such as those in the Luxembourg Palace and the Petit Palais), and to decorate town halls, prefectures, and ministries, including the Élysée Palace, the official residence of the French president. She also received commissions for frescoes in schools. Appreciated and supported by artists such as Antoine Bourdelle, Maurice Denis, and Suzanne Valadon, who became a good friend with, she exhibited regularly at the Salon des Indépendants and the Salon des Tuileries.

Determined to have women's artistic work recognized on an equal footing with that of men, she assumed the presidency of the Syndicat des artistes femmes peintres et sculpteurs in 1929, succeeding Marie Thelika Rideau-Paulet, who had founded it in 1904. Although president of this union, she considered that it had lost its focus and decided to launch her own breakaway group in 1931, to be known as the Society of Modern Women Artists (Société des Femmes Artistes Modernes), which explicitly sought out modern artists. Aided by her own reputation, Zoegger aimed to have women's artistic work recognized on an equal footing with that of men. The society held annual exhibitions from 1931 to 1938 in different locations in Paris and featured works by Valadon and other French artists such as Jane Poupelet, Marie Laurencin, Suzanne Duchamp, Camille Claudel, and Jeanne Bardey, as well as foreign artists such as the Argentine painter Mariette Lydis, the Polish painter Tamara de Lempicka, the Ukrainian sculptor Chana Orloff, the American painter and printmaker Mary Cassatt, and the Polish artist Olga Boznańska, among others. Despite its successful organization of major women-only exhibitions in the 1930s, the Society of Modern Women Artists ceased activities in the period leading up to World War II (1939–45). It did not resume operations following the war.

In 1936–37, Zoegger was on the organizing committee for the exhibition Les femmes artistes d'Europe, the first international exhibition of women's art in France, which was held at the Jeu de Paume in Paris in February 1937. She also exhibited.

== Awards ==
In 1912, she was made an Officier d'Académie and in 1922, an Officier de l'Instruction Publique. She became a Chevalier of the Légion d'Honneur in 1932 and, in 1951, she was promoted to the rank of Officer of the Légion d'Honneur.

== Death ==
Camax-Zoegger died on 31 October, 1952, in the 6th arrondissement of Paris. A retrospective of her work, alongside that of Valadon and Louise Hervieu, was held at the Palais Galliera in Paris in 1961.
