= Stanisława Centnerszwerowa =

Polish artist (1889–1943)

- Born: 1889; Warsaw, Poland
- Died: 1943 (aged 53–54); Białystok, Poland
- Known for: Painting

Stanisława Centnerszwerowa (1889–1943) was a Polish portrait and landscape artist who died in the Białystok ghetto.

== Early life and education ==
Centnerszwerowa (née Reicher) was born in 1889 into an intellectual Jewish family in Warsaw. She was educated at a private school in Warsaw run by the painter and engraver, Adolf Eduard Herstein. In 1907 she moved to Paris, where she studied painting with Henri-Jean Guillaume Martin and Émile Renard, becoming acquainted with the works of Paul Gauguin, Maurice Utrillo and Vincent van Gogh, who particularly iinfluenced her. In 1911 and 1912, she exhibited at the Paris Salon des Indépendants and also participated in a Polish exhibition in Barcelona, Spain, where her work was shown alongside artists such as Olga Boznańska, Leopold Gottlieb, Mela Muter, and Józef Pankiewicz. During her extensive travels around Europe, including France, Italy, and Yugoslavia, she produced architectural sketches and landscapes, some of which would later appear in exhibitions.

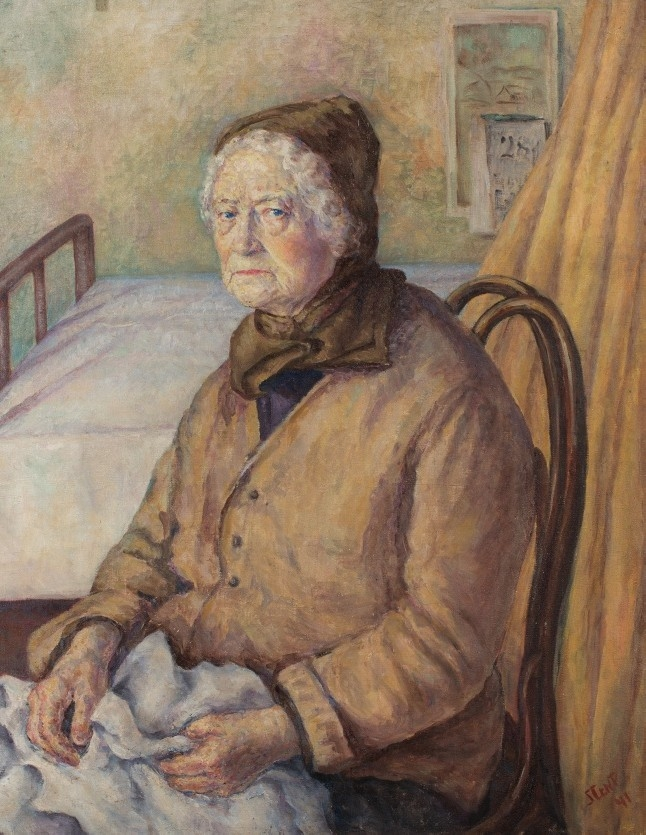
Painting by Stanisława Centnerszwerowa done in 1941 in the Białystok ghetto, Poland

== Artistic career ==
In 1912 or 1913, she returned to Warsaw, where she became one of the most prominent Jewish artists of her generation, together with figures such as Henryk Berlewi, Władysław Wajntraub, and Henryk Gotlib. In 1913, she participated in the collective exhibition of the "Young Art" Association of Visual Artists and in the second exhibition of Jewish artists, held at the Luxembourg Gallery in Warsaw. From 1914, she frequently exhibited at the Jewish Society for the Encouragement of Fine Arts and participated in numerous exhibitions of the Institute of Art Propaganda. A member of the Jewish artistic association "Muza" (Muse) from 1919, she held her first solo exhibition in 1924 at the Czesław Garliński Salon in Warsaw and other solo exhibitions at the same venue followed in 1927 and 1929. Also in 1924, Centnerszwerowa participated in an exhibition of Polish women artists in Paris. She was one of a small group of women who had a solo exhibition at the Jewish Society for the Promotion of Fine Arts. She was active in the Committee for Jewish Art.

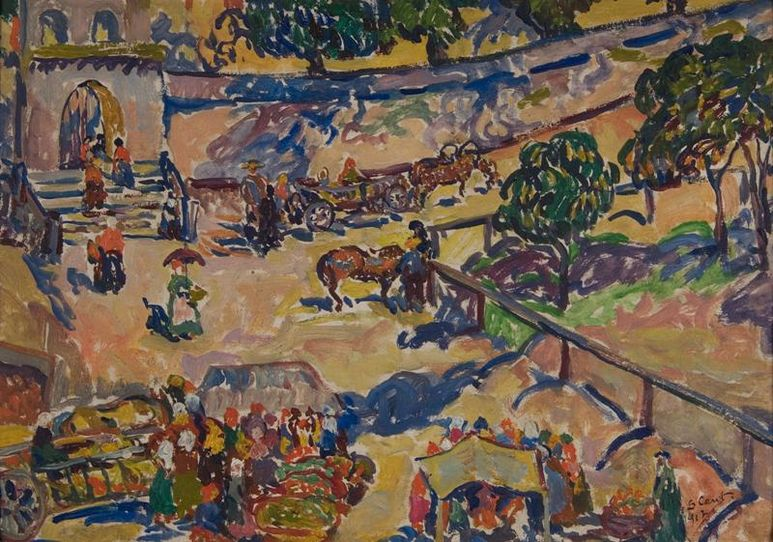
Landscape by Centnerszwerowa

In her early paintings, she drew from various contemporary artistic movements, beginning with French Post-Impressionism, but she later focused on methods of conveying light in landscapes with bright, warm tones. Her works began to be characterized by expressive texture, achieved by applying paint with a palette knife. In 1930, she participated in the First Exhibition of Polish Women Artists, held at the Municipal Museum in Bydgoszcz. In 1937 she was part of the Trade Union of Polish Artists (ZZPAP) Artists' Salon, held in Kraków, Lviv, Łódź, and Poznań and, in the same year, along with Weintraub and five other male painters, she participated in the "Group of Seven" exhibition at the Judaic Institute in Warsaw. Also in 1937, she contributed to the exhibition called Les femmes artistes d'Europe, the first international all-woman art show in France, held at the Jeu de Paume in Paris. In January 1938, at the annual Salon of the Society for the Promotion of Fine Arts, she presented a self-portrait, showing herself with a slim face, dark eyes, and a faint smile on her lips.

== Death and legacy ==
After the outbreak of World War II, Centnerszwerowa was in the city of Białystok, the capital of the Podlaskie Voivodeship in the north-east of Poland, together with her husband Maksymilian Centnerszwer, a renowned musician, composer, teacher, and music critic, and her daughter. They died during the Nazi German liquidation of Jews that followed the Białystok Ghetto uprising in August 1943. Her surviving works are now in several collections, such as those of the Łódź Museum of Art and the Jewish Historical Institute in Warsaw. The latter's collection includes three of her paintings from 1941, Portrait of Daughter Elżbieta, Portrait of an Old Man with a Cigarette, and Portrait of an Old Woman, which somehow survived the war. Showings of her work since her death include the 2014 Jewish Historical Institute exhibition called Salvaged, featuring works of Jewish artists who lived, and in most cases died, during the Holocaust.
