= Mária Modok =

Hungarian artist (1896–1971)

- Born: 27 September 1896; Ráckeve, Pest County, Hungary
- Died: 20 March 1971 (aged 74); Budapest, Hungary
- Known for: Painting
- Spouse: Béla Czóbel

Mária Modok (1896 –1971) was a Hungarian painter.

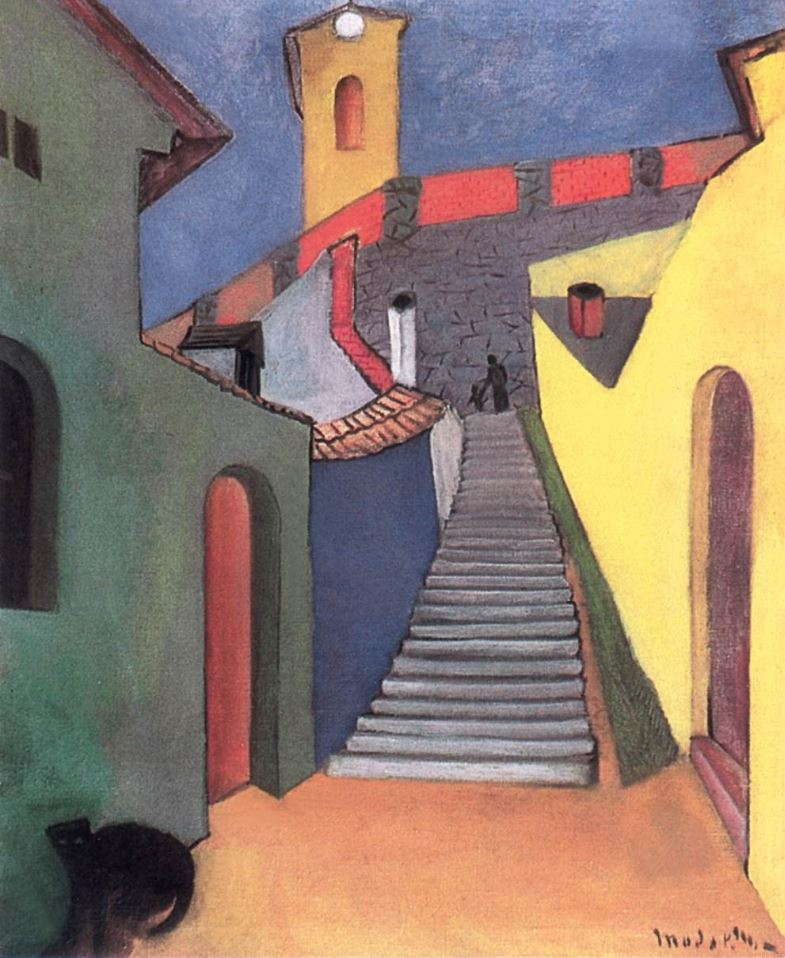
1932 painting by Modok of Szentendre

== Early life and education ==
Modok was born on 27 September 1896 in Ráckeve, in Pest County, Hungary. Her parents were István Modok and Mária Matyók. She attended the Hungarian Academy of Fine Arts between 1919 and 1923, where she was a student of István Réti, and went to the free school at the Nagybánya artists' colony, then in eastern Hungary, in 1923. This influenced her earlier work, which was in a naturalistic Nagybánya style. In 1930, she became a member of the New Society of Artists, and from that year she was an exhibiting artist. During the 1930s, while living in the Hungarian town of Szentendre, she travelled to Paris several times to study at private schools. During that period, she mainly created landscapes and large-scale cityscapes, inspired by Paris, such as the banks of the river Seine and Parisian sailboats. In 1937, she exhibited in the exhibition called Les femmes artistes d'Europe, the first international all-woman art show in France, held at the Jeu de Paume in Paris. In 1940 she married the painter Béla Czóbel, a highly regarded Hungarian artist.

== Artistic career ==
Modok's first solo exhibition took place at the Tamás Gallery in the Hungarian capital of Budapest in 1935. This showcased paintings of working-class mothers and children with her understanding of the issues facing the working class informing her paintings from this period. She often used her own facial figures in these pieces. She then lived in Paris between 1937 and 1939, with her paintings continuing to show a social conscience. Her marriage led to decisive changes to her art, as she devoted herself mainly to painting still lifes as well as landscapes of the areas surrounding where she lived, producing works that showed the influence of contemporary French painting, or post-Impressionism. Throughout the 1950s, Modok continued to visit Paris with her husband on a regular basis, usually in the winters. Among their circle of friends was the Portuguese artist, Maria Helena Vieira da Silva, who is considered to have had an influence on Modok's style. Indeed, these visits to Paris did lead to a further change in her style, as she began creating smaller, non-figurative works. As she moved from figurative to non-figurative, she began to develop expressive abstract art, using subtle, sensitive colours.

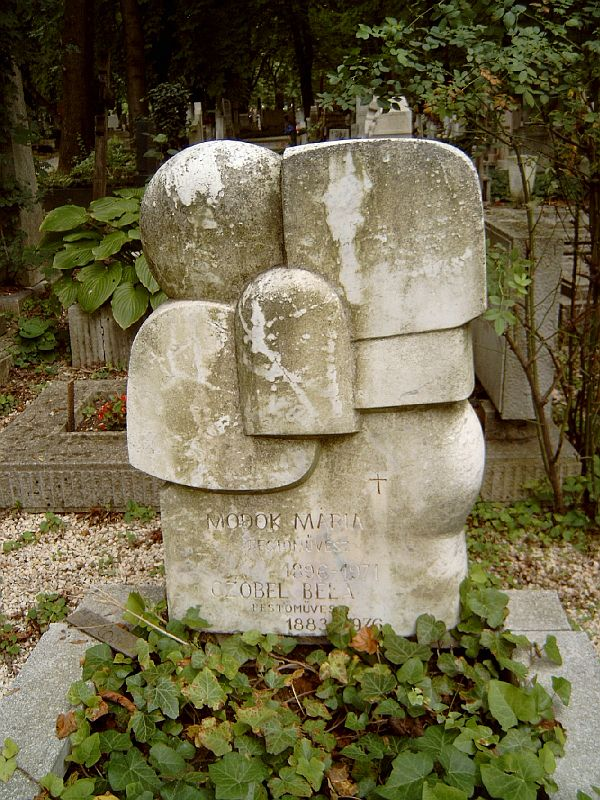
The gravestone of Modok and her husband

== Death ==
Modok died on 20 March 1971 in Budapest. She and her husband are buried together in Farkasréti Cemetery in Budapest. A retrospective exhibition was held in Esztergom, Hungary in 1974. Her work can be seen in the Czóbel Museum, Szentendre and at the Hungarian National Gallery in Budapest.
