= Elisabetta Keller =

- Self Portrait
- Born: July 6, 1891; Monza, Italy
- Died: February 19, 1969 (aged 77); San Francisco, California, US
- Known for: Portraits, pastels
- Movement: Lombardi naturalism, modernism
- Spouse: Giovanni Battista Pitscheider

Elisabetta Keller, also known as Elisabeth Keller, (6 July 1891 – 19 February 1969) was a Swiss artist born in Italy and a founder of the Italian Soroptimist Club.

Keller worked in many media, but preferred pastels. Though she created landscapes and still life, she was noted for her portraits, which were often of the upper-class and bourgeoisie of Milan. Among her subjects were her close friend, the poet Delio Tessa, and Pope Pius XI, a long-time family friend.

The Soroptimist Club of Milan, the first Soroptimist club in Italy, was organized during a series of meetings held at Keller's residence in 1928. Besides Keller, the first 25 members included the composer Giulia Recli and the writer Ada Negri. In 1931, Elisabeth Keller became the second president of the organization.
