= Cécile Cauterman =

Belgian artist (1882–1957)

Cécile Cauterman, née Cécile Boonans, (22 March 1882 – 11 March 1957) was a Belgian artist.

Cauterman was born in Ghent and studied with Jean Delvin at the Royal Academy of Fine Arts there. She worked in charcoal, pencil and pastel. After 1934, her drawings were often enhanced with oil paint. She also began to use watercolour later in her career. Her models included the disadvantaged and common people. She continued to exhibit up until the 1950s.

Cauterman died in Ghent at the age of 74.

Her work is included in the collections of the Museum of Fine Arts, Ghent and the Museum voor Oudheidkunde en Sierkunst en Schone Kunsten in Courtray.
