= Hanni Bay =

Swiss painter and illustrator (1885–1978)

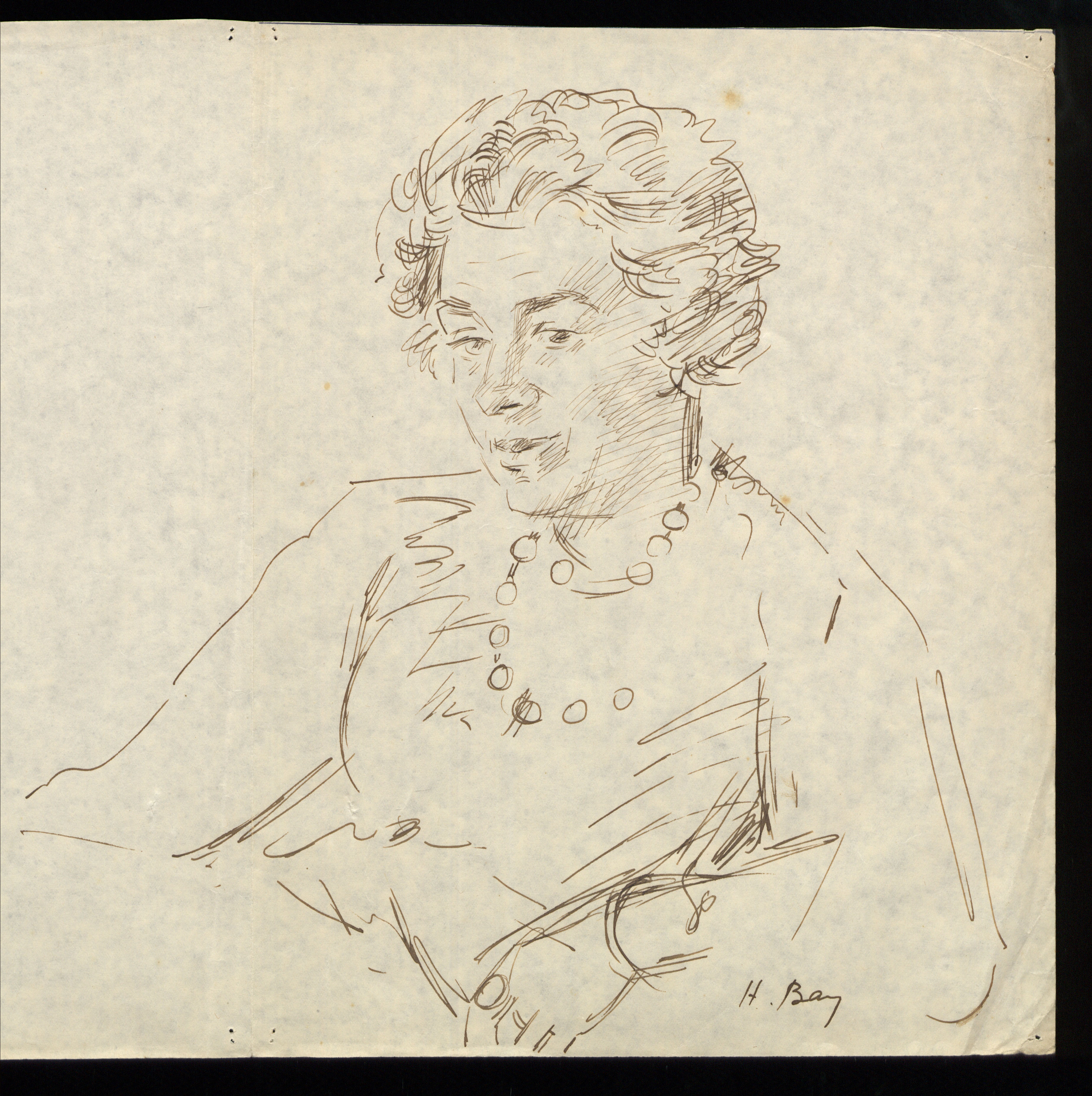
- Portrait by Bay of Cécile Ines Loos (1883–1959)
- Born: 29 September 1885; Belp, Switzerland
- Died: 11 March 1978 (aged 92); Bern, Switzerland
- Known for: Paintings; pen and ink drawings
- Spouse: Albert Hitz

Hanni Bay (1885–1978) was a Swiss painter and illustrator and an activist in the women's rights and labour movements.

== Early life ==
Hanni Bay was born in Belp in the Bern-Mittelland administrative district of Switzerland on 29 September 1885. She was the third of six children of Rudolf and Luise Bay. After a year in Antwerp, Belgium (1901–1902) from where she had to return to Switzerland after the sudden death of her father, the owner of a textile factory, she attended the School of Applied Arts in Bern from 1902 to 1904, then moving to Munich to study at the studio of Hermann Groeber. Between 1906 and 1908 she studied with the Swiss painter, Cuno Amiet in Oschwand in the municipality of Seeburg. In 1908, she spent a year in Paris, where she studied at the Académie Ranson under Félix Vallotton, Pierre Bonnard, Edouard Vuillard and Maurice Denis. In 1910, she married Albert Hitz. They had three daughters, born in 1913, 1915, and 1917, but divorced in 1925.

Between 1905 and 1910, Bay was part of a group of young mountaineers, among them the future painters Otto Morach, Arnold Brügger, and Johannes Itten, as well as her future husband. Mountaineering inspired many of her paintings. In 1907, she joined the Oberhasli section of the Swiss Alpine Club (SAC), while her husband was a co-founder of the Academic Alpine Club of Bern (AACB). Even in her youth, Bay climbed the difficult Bietschhorn and Schreckhorn mountains.

== Career ==
In the early years of her career, it was nearly impossible for female artists to exhibit in Switzerland. Thus, in 1911, Bay joined the GSMBK (Society of Swiss Women Painters, Sculptors, and Applied Artists) and subsequently participated in various cantonal and national exhibitions in Bern and Neuchâtel. Bay was socially and artistically active in the labour and women's rights movements of Switzerland, beginning while living in Chur between 1913 and 1917 and continuing after she moved to Zürich. In 1918, she was commissioned to design the murals in the Chur Women's Hospital, which have not survived. In Zürich she attended the 1919 trial of the initiators of the 1918 Swiss general strike and her portrait drawings were published as illustrations in the two-volume work The General Strike Trial of the Members of the Olten Action Committee before Military Court 3 from March 12 to April 9, 1919.

For a considerable time, her family responsibilities determined her choice of subject matter and working methods. She captured scenes of everyday family life in a graphic diary. Among her activities was the designing of a leaflet with an appeal for donations to benefit the starving in the Soviet Union. Using pencil, charcoal, pen, and black ink to draw orphanages, soup kitchens, and asylums, she created a documentation of the social problems of the 1920s in Switzerland. Charitable institutions would publish these as postcards. After her divorce, she raised her children on her own. For financial reasons, she began working as a photojournalist for newspapers and magazines, for example by drawing portraits of VIPs for national journals. She also painted landscapes, portraits, and murals but, after 1942 when she returned to Bern, and her children had all grown up, she devoted herself increasingly to landscape painting, creating numerous landscape paintings based on locations around the lakes of Biel, Neuchâtel, and Geneva, and in the Bernese Oberland, and in the cantons of Valais and Ticino. These paintings are characterised by a realistic depiction of the locations and a style that captures the changing light and colour throughout the day and seasons. She had little interest in selling her work and it was only through the efforts of her youngest daughter that exhibitions were organized in Switzerland.

She travelled frequently to Paris and also visited Italy, Greece, Egypt, and Tunisia. Among the exhibitions she showed at was Les femmes artistes d'Europe, the first international all-woman art show in France, held at the Jeu de Paume in Paris in early 1937. Her works are now held, among other places, by the Museum of Fine Arts Bern, the Bündner Kunstmuseum in Chur, the Volkshaus in Zürich, the Kunsthaus Zürich, the Graphic Collection of ETH Zurich, and the Swiss National Library.

== Death ==
Bay died in Bern on 11 March 1978. She had been an ardent fighter for women's rights, including the right to vote, which Swiss women only achieved seven years before her death. Her intellectual estate is held at the Bern Burgerbibliothek and the ArchivArte, also in Bern.
