= Martha Pfannenschmid =

Swiss illustrator (1900–1999)

- Born: 22 March 1900; Basel, Switzerland
- Died: 27 March 1999 (aged 99); Basel
- Known for: Book illustrations

Martha Pfannenschmid (1900–1999) was a Swiss illustrator. A secretary, laboratory assistant, and technical aide at the Institute of Forensic Medicine at the University of Basel, she later became known for her illustrations for the children's books, Heidi and Pinocchio.

== Early life and education ==
Pfannenschmid was born on 22 March 1900, in Basel, Switzerland and spent most of her life in that city. Her mother was born Ida Tschumi, from Wolfisberg in the Canton of Bern. Her father, Amadeus Rudolf Pfannenschmid, came from an old Basel family and worked for the finance department of the canton of Basel-Stadt. He was the son of a well-known Basel frame maker and gilder. In his youth, he had stayed at the Nymphenburg Palace in Munich, Germany because the King of Bavaria admired his drumming skills. Pfannenschmid's elder sister died of diphtheria in 1905. She also had a brother. After her father's death in 1923, when he drowned himself in the river Rhine, her mother remarried twice more, which strained the relationship between mother and daughter. Pfannenschmid developed a talent for drawing and painting at an early age, which her father encouraged. She attended the Basel School of Applied Arts and received training in graphic design, art, and modelling. As part of her studies, she spent an extended period in Tuscany, which also influenced her later illustrations.

== Career ==
She was supported and inspired by friendships with painters such as Werner Neuhaus and Niklaus Stoecklin, along with Stoecklin's wife and daughter. Her interests included the poetic, humanistic, and scientific works of the German writer, Johann Wolfgang von Goethe and of the Austrian philosopher, Rudolf Steiner. She sketched theatrical performances staged at the Goetheanum in Dornach, Switzerland. With a strong connection to Basel, she also created sketches of the Basel Carnival. Close ties to her hometown are also evident in her later illustrations.

Pfannenschmid initially specialised in microscopic drawing at the Zoological Institute of Basel University, working with the Swiss zoologist, Adolf Portmann. Between 1925 and 1960 she was employed at the Institute of Forensic Medicine of the university, where she created large-format lecture charts (approximately 1.50 × 3.50 metres), which were used to teach students the fundamentals of forensic medicine. Coverage of the 53 teaching charts included blunt and sharp force trauma, traffic accidents, gunshot wounds, death by electrocution, burning, poisoning, drowning, hanging, infanticide and abortion, as well as blood sampling, bloodstains, coagulation, vasoconstriction, sperm and blood alcohol content, and the structure of an expert report. These schematic representations made it possible to avoid the information overload provided by photographs, and ideal cases rather than individual cases could be discussed in classes. For the Institute of Pathology at the University of Basel, Pfannenschmid also drew microscopic slides that were reproduced in textbooks.

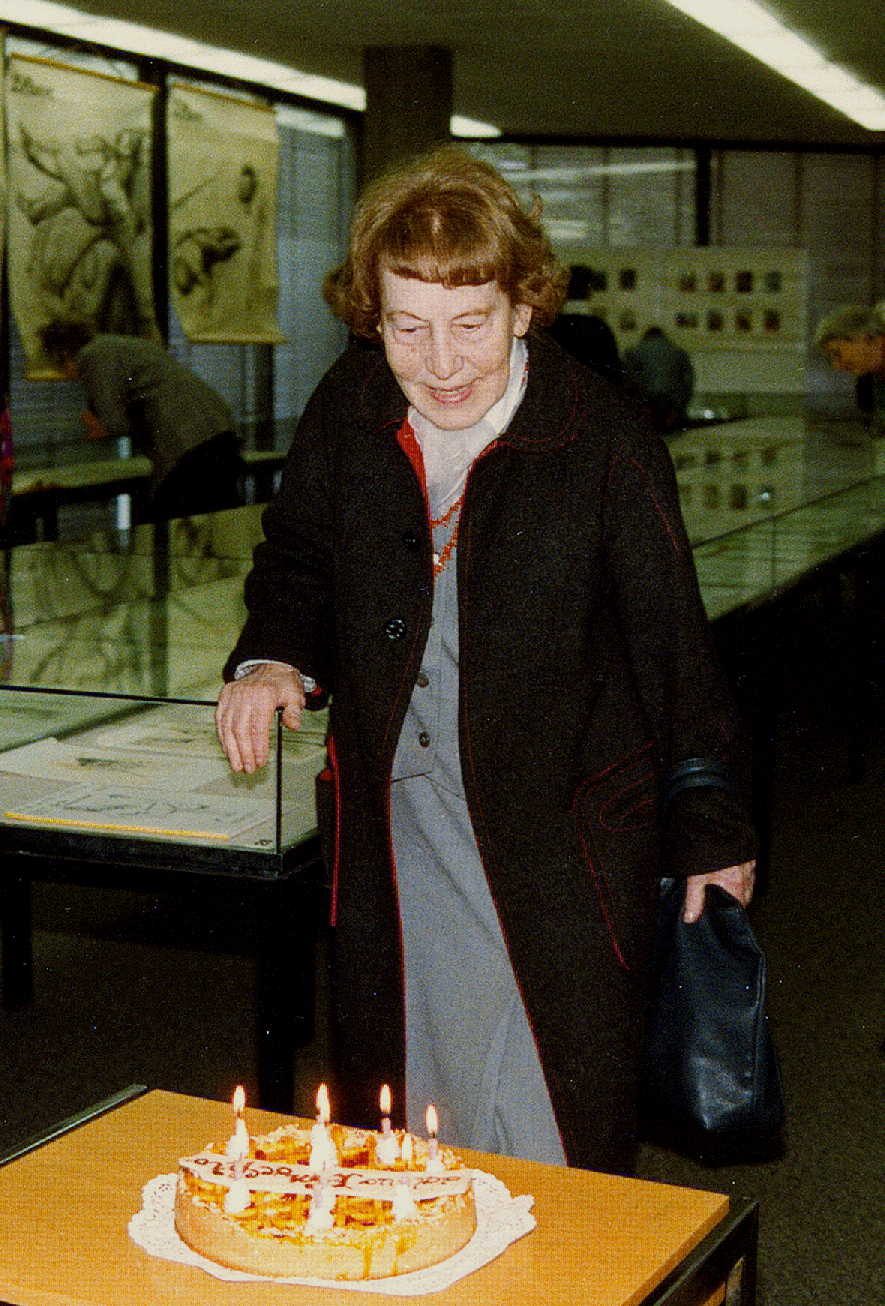
Pfannenschmid celebrating her 90th birthday

== Book Illustrations ==
Pfannenschmid worked on a part-time basis as a book illustrator for various publications and children's books. From 1929 to 1951, she illustrated the children's supplement of the National Zeitung, known as Der kleine Nazi (The Little Nazi), most of which survives in her estate. The name had nothing to do with national socialism but reflected the slang term for the National Zeitung in Basel. She also created illustrations for the Schweizerischer Beobachter (Swiss Observer) and the Gute Schriften (Good Writings). She also worked artistically for the Swiss Youth Literature Foundation. From 1939 to 1945, she illustrated children's books by Johanna Spyri, including the Heidi books and Moni der Geissbub (Moni the Goat Boy). In Heidi, Pfannenschmid's illustrations were delicately watercoloured. Her drawings of the Swiss Alpine child with dark, curly hair and rosy cheeks shaped the image of Heidi around the world and even inspired the 1974 Japanese anime series. After retiring in 1960, she also illustrated the children's story Pinocchio by the Italian writer Carlo Collodi, among other activities. These illustrations show a brightening of her colour palette and an increase in expressiveness. The illustrations for both the Heidi books and Pinocchio were drawn in a small format (16 × 12.5 cm) so that they could be printed at their original size to preserve quality. For the illustrations of Pinocchio, Pfannenschmid drew, among other things, on the drawings she had made in Italy.

== Exhibitions ==
Pfannenschmid's work has been shown in various exhibitions in Switzerland including at the Kunsthalle Basel, as well as outside Switzerland. In early 1937, her work was among those shown at Les femmes artistes d'Europe, the international exhibition of art by women held at the Jeu de Paume in Paris. On the occasion of her 80th birthday in 1980, her work was exhibited at the Galerie Münsterberg and, to celebrate her 90th birthday, it was exhibited at the University Library of Basel, which displayed her illustrations for Heidi and Pinocchio. These and other works are part of her estate held in the university library. Other works are in public collections, in the collections of major corporations, and in private hands.

== Death ==
Pfannenschmid died on 27 March 1999 in Basel. She was buried in the Hörnli cemetery.
