= Adriana Pincherle =

Italian painter (1905–1996)

Adriana Pincherle (Rome, 1905 - Florence, 1996) was an Italian painter.

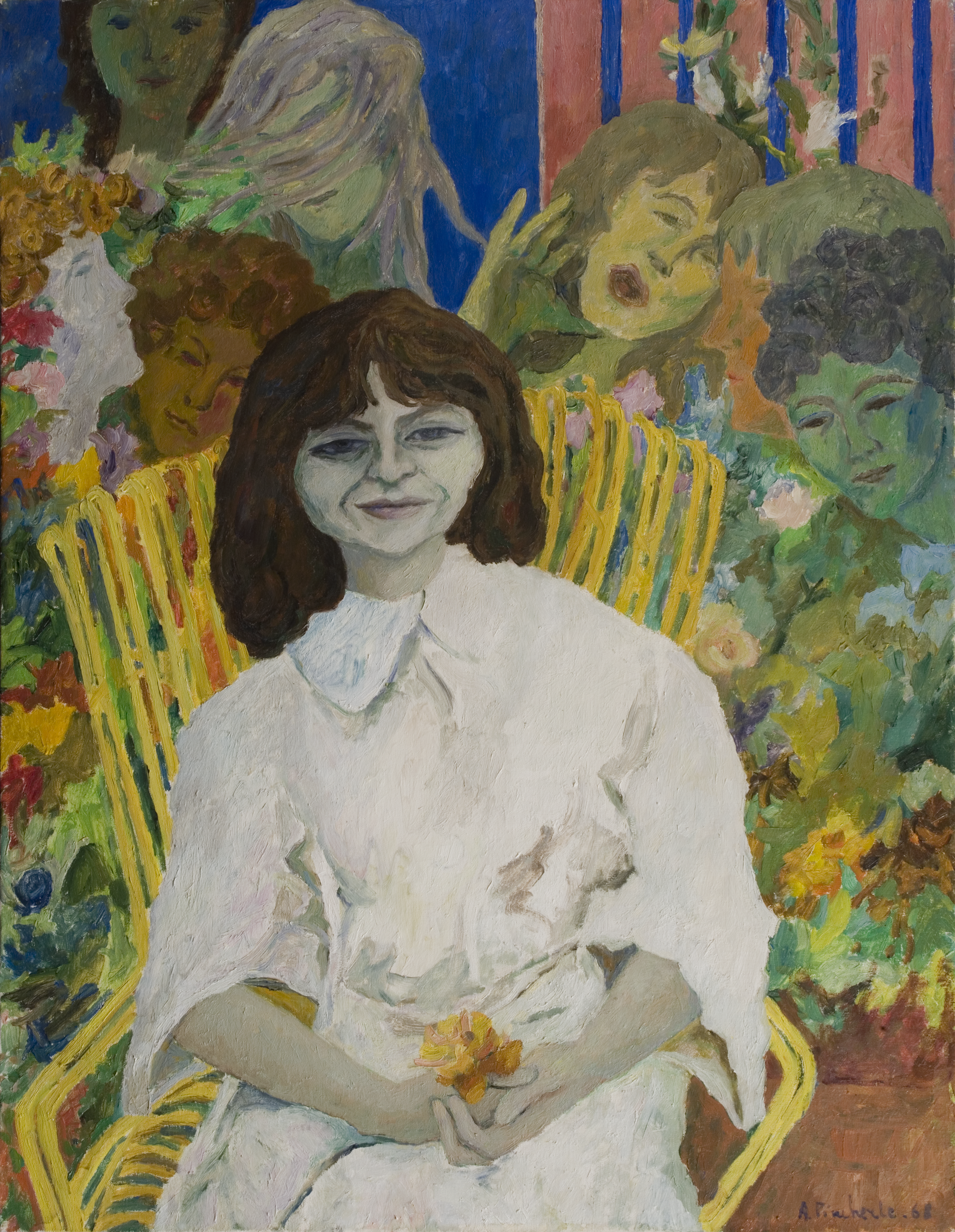
Adriana Pincherle, Portrait of Elsa Morante

== Childhood and education ==
Adriana Pincherle, the older sister of writer Alberto Moravia, came from an upper-middle-class family. Her father, Carlo Pincherle, was Jewish and her mother, Isa De Marsanich, was Catholic. From an early age, Pincherle took special interest in her father’s watercolors, and it was probably then that a sensitivity to art and color was born in her. After finishing her classical studies, she began to attend Alfredo Petrucci’s atelier ‘for young ladies’ and she enrolled in the Scuola Libera del Nudo at the Accademia di Belle Arti di Roma. During her studies, she met Mimmo Spadini and Scipione, thanks to whom she was able to make inroads into the Roman artistic environment.

== Career ==
Pincherle made her artistic debut in 1931 in the group show “Prima mostra romana d'arte femminile” at the Galleria di Roma, where Roberto Longhi noticed her. In 1932, at the same gallery, she exhibited one of her works alongside that of Corrado Cagli. Noted by Longhi, the work made her his favorite of the two artists. Her personal and intellectual growth was due to her exchange of study between the Scuola Romana and the school of painters of the Via Cavour group, but her maturation in the field of painterly research and in her style began with her stay in Paris in 1933. During World War II, she began to experiment with the technique of tempera painting. She was particularly influenced by the Impressionist movement and the styles of the Fauves, Renoir, and Matisse.

Newly returned to Florence in 1933, Pincherle made her first appearance in the Sala d’arte delle Nazioni and in the Galerie de la Jeune Europe in Paris. She made the acquaintance of the founders of the group “I sei di Torino”, stimulating the beginning of her re-elaboration of her French work. Between 1934 and 1936, the artist dedicated herself to exhibiting her work, including at the 1934 Exhibition of Contemporary Italian Art in the USA, in 1935 at the second Rome Quadriennale, and in 1936 at the gallery "La Cometa".

In the following years, she exhibited at different shows in Rome, Florence, Milan, and Venice. Roberto Longhi presented her work at the Galleria del Vantaggio in Rome in 1955, demonstrating her artistic growth over the course of her career. Often, the painter did not sign her masterpieces until the moment of their sale or exhibition.

Notwithstanding the death of her husband in 1966, Pincherle continued to paint until the final days of her life, though she suffered memory loss. She died following a heart attack on January 8, 1996.

== Private life ==
She met the painter Onofrio Martinelli in Genoa and married him in 1934. Pincherle and Martinelli moved into her home in Florence in 1934. With the arrival of World War II and racial discrimination, Pincherle was forced to hide in small towns including Bibbiena, Vallombrosa and Taranto due to her Jewish heritage. After the end of the war, the couple began a series of annual trips to Paris in continual search of contemporary French artworks.

== Style ==
Adriana Pincherle showed a preference for portraiture. She admitted also that she enjoyed painting in tempera more than in oil. Furthermore, she preferred to mix different painting techniques. In her style, characterized by vibrant colors, you can recognize her homages to the works of Scipione, the darting brushstrokes typical of Carlo Levi, and other techniques practiced by painters that influenced her in 1933, among them Soutine, Pascin, Chagall, and Derain. Another source of inspiration for the painter was her father and his style of watercolor, which was in turn inspired by Monet. “Passavo delle ore a guardarlo dipingere, mi affascinava” ("I spent hours watching him paint, it fascinated me").

== Bibliography ==
- Toti, Chiara; Toti, Lucia Mannini (2014). Pincherle and Pacini. Twentieth-century Women Painters in Florence. Florence: The Florentine Press. ISBN 978-88-97696-04-9.
