= Ester Helenius =

Finnish painter (1875-1955)

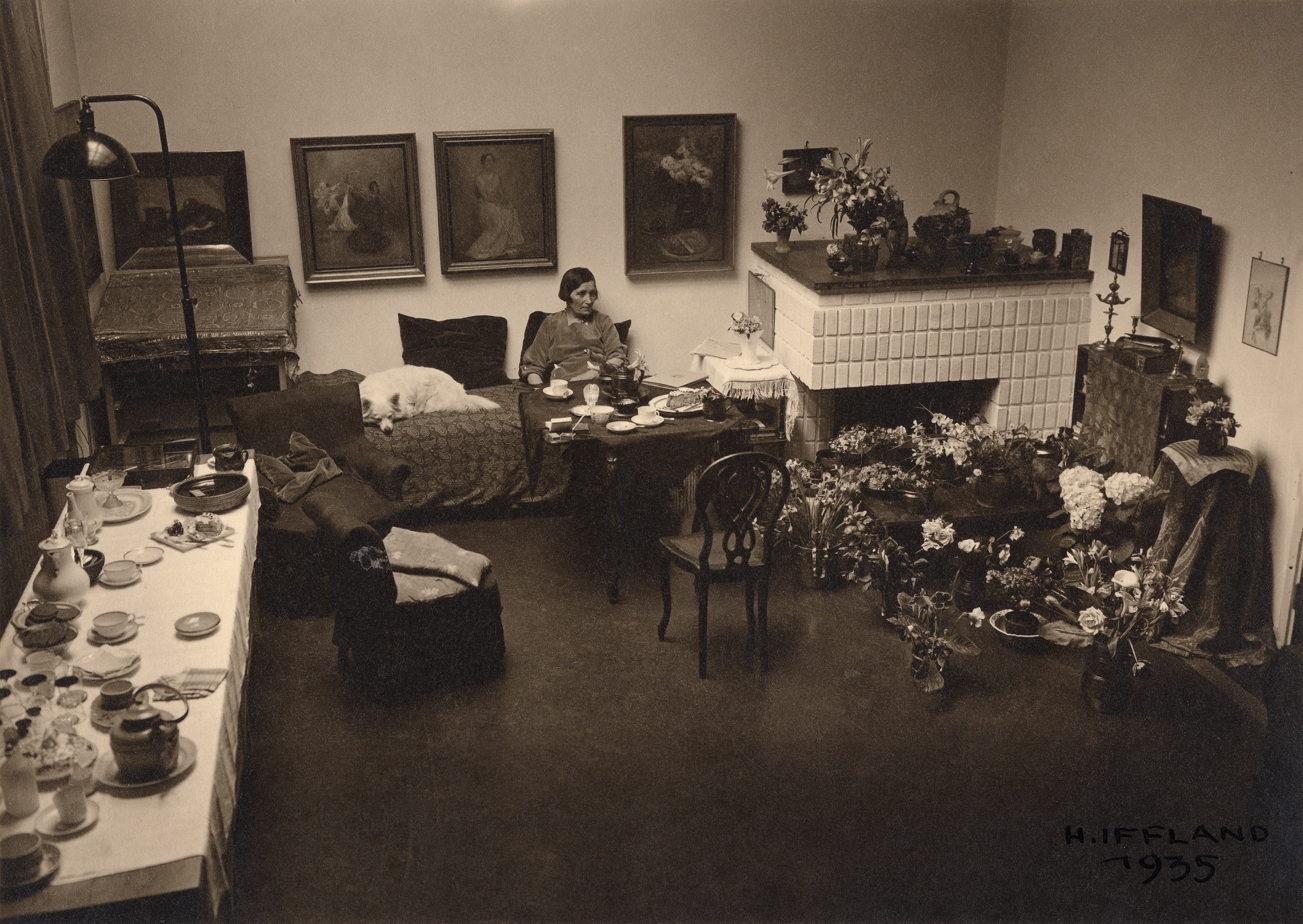
Ester Helenius photographed by Heinrich Iffland, 1935.

Ester Emmy Maria Helenius (16 May 1875 – 12 October 1955) was a Finnish artist known for the vibrant use of color in her paintings. This vibrancy was so notable that art historian Tutta Palin described her as a "worshipper of ecstasy." While mainly a painter, Helenius was also trained in printmaking.

== Life and career ==
Helenius was an artist in residence at the famous Lallukka Artists’ Home in the Etu-Töölö district of Helsinki. Her art from this period was on display in 2020–2021 at the Helsinki Art Museum in the exhibition Lallukka – Life in the Home of Artists, alongside other well-known Finnish visual artists of the mid 20th century. Helenius' work has gained posthumous notoriety after being written on by Finnish art historian Tutta Palin in the book Ester Helenius: Värihurmion palvoja, a popular reference for tracing the evolution of Helenius' work. Her sales records have been donated to the Hämeenlinna Art Museum as part of her legacy.

Helenius is known to have had love affairs with women. Popular Finnish author and illustrator Tove Jansson has written of her interactions with Helenius during her time in Paris, France in her book Letters From Tove. Both artists lived at the Lallukka Artists’ Home. Helenius' art can be found at auction on sites such as Hagelstam & Co. and Bukowskis for estimated values of up to 2,000 euros Her work also remains in the collections of the Finnish National Gallery, the Helsinki Art Museum, and the Hämeenlinna Art Museum, among others.
