= Nanette Genoud =

Swiss painter and lithographer (1907-1987)

- Born: Jean-Pierrette Genoud; 9 April 1907; Lausanne, Switzerland
- Died: 30 November 1987 (aged 80); Lausanne
- Known for: Paintings, lithographs

Nanette Genoud (1907–1987) was a Swiss painter and lithographer.

== Early life and education ==
Genoud was born on 9 April 1907 in Lausanne in the canton of Vaud in Switzerland. She was given the name of Jean-Pierrette but took the name of Nanette. In 1923 she enrolled in the Cantonal School of Drawing, which later became the School of Fine Arts and Applied Arts and then the Cantonal School of Art in Lausanne. In 1924 and 1925, she lived in Freiburg im Breisgau, Germany, where she studied painting. Returning to Lausanne, she continued her training at the school of Georges Aubert, while working in the atelier of the Swiss painter, Rodolphe-Théophile Bosshard. In 1928, she moved to Paris to study for a year at the Académie Delécluse and Académie Colarossi. A visit to Brittany in 1929 led to the sea becoming a recurrent motif in her work.

== Artistic career ==
In 1931, Genoud exhibited at the 49th Annual Salon des Femmes in Paris, organized by the Union of Women Painters and Sculptors. She joined the GSMBK (Society of Swiss Women Painters, Sculptors, and Applied Artists) in 1932 and the following year the (SGBK) Society of Swiss Painters, Sculptors, and Architects. Receiving grants that enabled her to travel to Greece and Italy between 1936 and 1938, she held a solo exhibition at the Circolo Svizzero in Rome. In February 1937, she was among those to exhibit at Les femmes artistes d'Europe, the first international all-woman art exhibition in France, held at the Jeu de Paume in Paris. In 1943, Genoud won prizes in Switzerland for her work, and in that and following years was regularly exhibiting in Switzerland. Between 1947 and 1949 she was president of the Vaud section of the SGBK. In 1952, she started to use lithography, which became her preferred artistic technique. Between 1956 and 1964, she taught drawing at the Lausanne School of Fine Arts. In 1958 she exhibited at the Swiss Exhibition for Women's Work in Zurich, an exhibition that had previously only been held once, in 1928.

Genoud's paintings have been compared to those of the American impressionist painter, Mary Cassatt. Similar to Cassatt, Genoud focused on subjects that emphasized women's experience. She travelled to several countries, but particularly liked to visit the Italian islands of Elba, Ischia, and Giglio. During a trip to Egypt in 1961, she painted a mural in the lobby of a leading Cairo hotel.

== Death ==
Genoud died on 30 November 1987 in Lausanne. In 2010, her daughter, Françoise Roulin-Genoud, bequeathed to the Artist Studios Foundation a collection of her oil paintings, together with 850 works on paper, sketchbooks, and other documentary archives.
