= Vera Rockline =

Russian post-impressionist painter

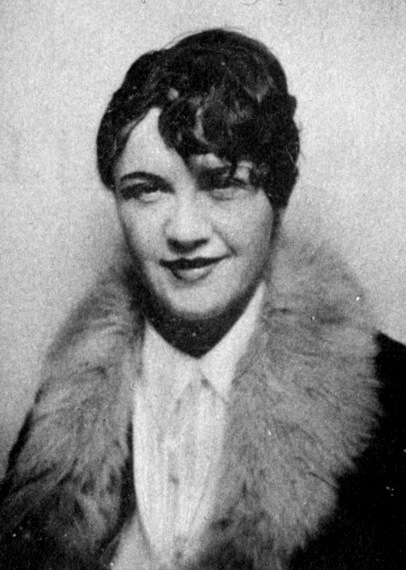
- Born: Vera Nikolayevna Schlesinger; 1896; Moscow, Russian Empire
- Died: 4 April 1934 (aged 37–38); Paris, France
- Known for: Painting
- Movement: Post-Impressionism

Vera Nikolayevna Rokhlina (née Schlesinger; 1896 – 4 April 1934), gallicised and known in Western sources as Véra Rockline, was a Post-impressionist painter of Russo-Jewish descent, active in Paris during the Interwar era.

== Personal life and career ==
Rockline was the daughter of a German-Jewish man (Nikolai Schlesinger) and a French woman (Jeanne Malebranche), and started her career in Moscow, studying in the studio of Ilya Mashkov, who considered her one of his most brilliant students. In 1918 she became an apprentice at Aleksandra Ekster's studio in Kiev, Ukraine. Ekster, who personally knew Pablo Picasso and Guillaume Apollinaire had great influence on Rockline's initial style, also inspiring her creative and free painting spirit.

In 1918 and 1919, she exhibited at the 24th Moscow Artists Association Exposition, and in other gallery and association exhibitions. Also in 1918, she married a certain Rokhlin, from whom she adopted his name. In 1919 she left Russia, spending two years in Tbilisi and in 1921 she immigrated to France, where she eventually obtained French citizenship. At first, Rockline and her husband lived with relatives of her mother, in Burgundy. In 1922, they moved to Paris, where there were a large Russian community, of which Rockline became part, living at Rue de Hambourg, nº 12, near Montmartre.

=== Road to success ===
In 1922, Rockline exhibited paintings in the Russian section of the Salon d'Automne, at the Salon des Independants and at the Salon Tuileries, where she had a positive reception from media and visitors. Some of her paintings won prizes in the expositions. The journalist and art critic Raymond Escholier (1882–1971), curator of Petit Palais museum, called her series of artistic nude paintings a "symphony of flesh". After styling herself on Cubism and Impressionism, Rockline started to develop her own style, "something between Courbet and Renoir", according to the critics from L’Art et les Artistes" magazine.

Paul Poiret was one of her admirers and bought two of her paintings, helping to promote her art and introduced her to the French poet and art aficionado, Charles Vildrac (1882–1971), who helped Rockline on her first solo exhibition in his gallery in 1924.

In 1927, she became member of Salon d’Automne Society, a privileged position and became independent of her husband, probably divorcing him and moved to Montparnasse. Her financial independence coincided with a change in her art style. Her works became lighter, free, closer to Impressionism, with a softer color palette, predominantly with Renoir-styled brushstrokes. Always focused on depicting female nudes, who predominated on her studio, she joined the Women Artists' Society and established close contact with several art colleagues, in particular Zinaida Serebriakova.

Rockline had several solo art exhibitions in Paris galleries, including Vildrac (1925), Bernheim (1926), La Boetie (1930) and Barreiro (1932, 1933). At what was to be the peak of her fame and success, Rockline committed suicide by overdosing on Veronal, under uncertain circumstances, on 4 April 1934. She was buried in Recey-sur-Ource, Côte-d’Or, in Burgundy.

== Legacy ==
Although Rockline was almost forgotten upon her demise, a new interest on her art arose from galleries and art collectors during the early 21st century. In 2002 a large exhibition of her work was held in Montparnasse, “Elles de Montparnasse", where her works were shown together with works by Tamara de Lempicka, Marie Laurencin, Hannah Orlova, Sonia Delaunay and Natalia Goncharova.

A retrospective exhibition of Vera Rockline's works was held in Galerie Drouart (Paris, France) in 1984. Since 2017 Galerie Drouart (now Cabinet Expertise Drouart) is preparing the catalogue raisonné of Vera Rockline.

In June 2008, her painting Card Players (1919) was sold in an auction at Christie's, in London, for 2 million pounds.

== Selected art ==
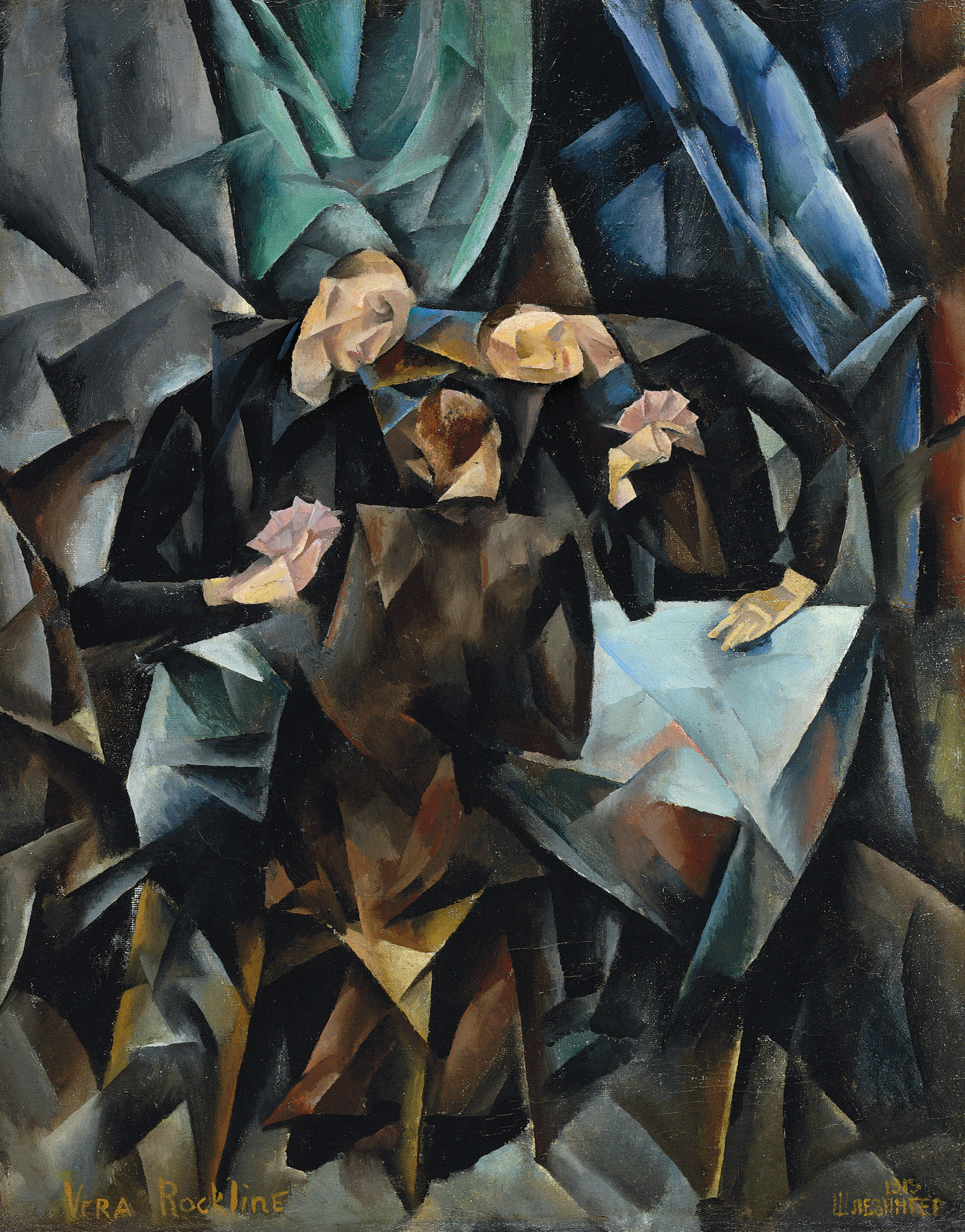
The Card Players (1919)

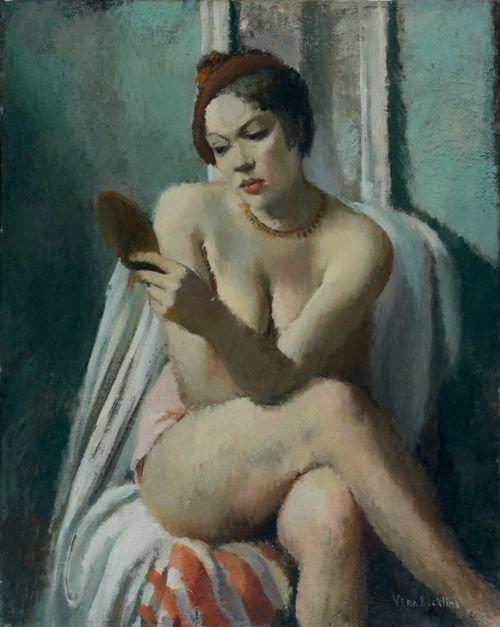
Nude with red beret at her toilet (1920)

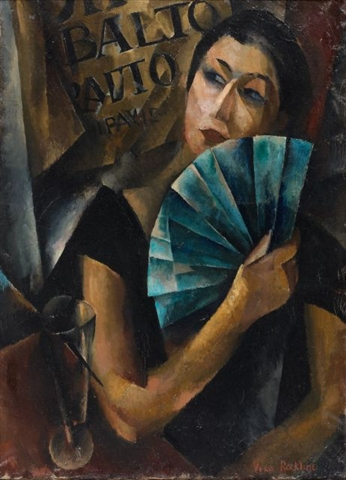
Portrait of a young woman with blue fan (1919)

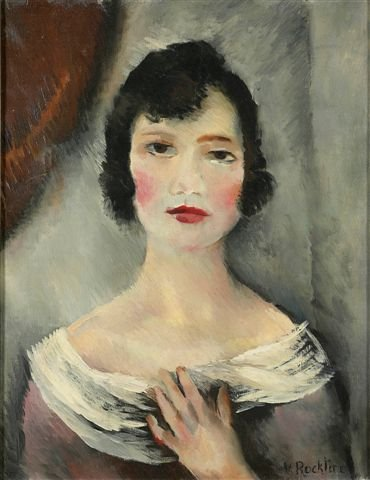
Self-Portrait (1922)

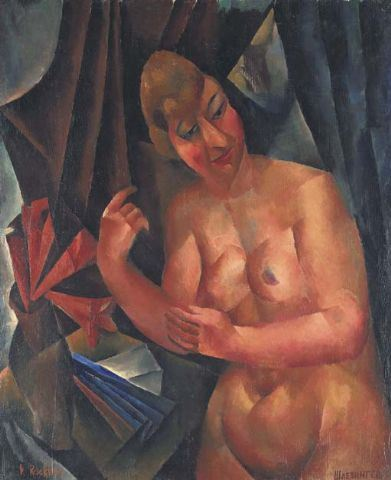
Nude with blue interior (1919–1921)
