= Esther Mengold =

Swiss artist (1877–1954)

Esther Altherr-Mengold
- Born: Esther Mengold; 25 August 1877; Basel, Switzerland
- Died: 25 April 1954 (aged 76); Basel
- Known for: Painting
- Parent(s): Adolf Mengold (1841–1912) and Hermine Mengold (née Naegeli)

Esther Altherr-Mengold (1877–1954) was a Swiss painter of portraits, landscapes and still lifes.

== Early life and education ==
Mengold was born Esther Mengold in Basel in Switzerland on 25 August 1877. She was the daughter of Adolf Mengold (1841–1912) and Hermine, née Naegeli (1855–1927). She attended the Basel School of Applied Arts, or General Trade School, where she took painting and drawing classes with Johann Baptist Weißbrod. She then studied briefly at the Accademia di Belle Arti di Firenze (Florence, Italy) before deciding to continue her studies independently, moving to Munich in Germany. There, she joined the Munich Women Artists' Association. One of the teachers there, Leo Putz, recommended that she study in the artists' colony in Dachau and she moved there to study under Adolf Hölzel. She soon left Dachau and went to London to study and paint completely independently, beginning to make a name for herself as a portraitist before returning to Basel.

== Career ==
Continuing to work on portraits, including one of the Swiss poet, Siegfried Lang, Mengold began to exhibit in Basel in around 1904. In March 1907, she joined with other younger painters from Basel to organise an exhibition. This aroused some opposition, particularly from the city's older and more-established artists. Among those to exhibit were Carl Burckhardt and his wife, Sophie, as well as Paul Altherr, who Mengold married in that year. Altherr's brother, Heinrich Altherr, was also closely involved with the group.

Mengold became a member of the Basel section of the Swiss Society of Women Artists in the Visual Arts (SGBK). She exhibited her work regularly in group exhibitions organized by the society at venues including the Kunsthalle Zürich, the Kunsthalle Basel, and the Kunsthaus Zürich. In 1937 a piece by her was included in Les femmes artistes d'Europe, the first international all-woman art show in France, held at the Jeu de Paume in Paris.

== Death ==
Mengold died on 25 April 1954 in Basel. She was buried in the Wolfgottesacker cemetery in Basel.
