= Beatrice Jacquart =

American politician

Member of the Kansas House of Representatives from the 121st district
- In office January 14, 1957 – January 9, 1967
- Preceded by: W. O. Kelman
- Succeeded by: Keith M. Wilcox

Personal details
- Born: October 28, 1911 Larned, Kansas, U.S.
- Died: November 29, 1990 (aged 79) Dodge City, Kansas, U.S.
- Party: Republican
- Spouse: James A. Williams (m. 1968–1990)

Beatrice Jacquart (October 28, 1911 – November 29, 1990) was an American politician who served as a member of the Kansas House of Representatives from 1957 to 1966 as the representative of the 121st District in Haskell County, Kansas.

1957–1958 Kansas House Committee assignments

- Chairman of Printing
- Vice Chairman of Memorials
- Cities of the Third Class
- State Affairs
- State Parks and Memorials

1959–1960 Kansas House Committee assignments

- Chairman of Memorials
- Cities of the Third Class
- Roads and Highways
- State Affairs

1961–1962 Kansas House Committee assignments

- Chairman of Cities of the Third Class
- Vice Chairman of State Affairs
- Vice Chairman of Public Health
- Memorials
- Municipalities

1963–1964 Kansas House Committee assignments

- Chairman of Public Health
- Chairman of Memorials
- Vice Chairman of Printing
- Cities of the Third Class
- State Affairs

1965–1966 Kansas House Committee assignments

- Chairman of Public Health
- Chairman of Memorials
- Chairman of Printing
- Cities of the Third Class
- State Affairs
