= Antonietta Paoli Pogliani =

Italian sculptor

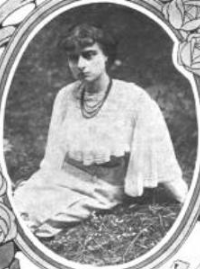
- Born: 9 November 1886; Castell'Alfero, Italy
- Died: 3 January 1956 (aged 69)
- Occupation: Sculptor

Antonietta Paoli Pogliani (9 November 1886 – 3 January 1956) was an Italian sculptor. Her work was part of the sculpture event in the art competition at the 1924 Summer Olympics.

== Bibliography ==
- Alfonso Panzetta (2003). Nuovo dizionario degli scultori italiani dell'Ottocento e del primo Novecento. Torino: Ad Arte. p. 698. ISBN 88-89082-00-3.
- Ferrettini, Ernesto (1913). "Alle nostre Esposititrici". La donna (in Italian). No. 203. Torino (published 5 June 1913). p. 17.
