= Suzanne Cocq =

Belgian painter and engraver

Suzanne Cocq, born in Ixelles on June 12, 1894 and died in Etterbeek on July 12, 1979 was a painter of landscapes and still lifes, etcher and Belgian wood engraver.

== Career ==
Cocq trained at the school in Ixelles where she studied decorative arts from 1907 to 1910 then applied arts, illustration, bookbinding and illumination, then followed the courses of Constant Montald at the Royal Academy of Fine Arts in Brussels. She shone particularly in gouache painting. According to Eugène De Seyn, she was endowed with a "delicate talent which denotes feeling and emotion and has a decorative sense." Her style is distinguished by “a certain naivety of the linear technique and a range of tender colors."

== Family ==
Suzanne Cocq was the daughter of Fernand Cocq, mayor of Ixelles. She had married the painter and engraver Maurice de Brocas de Lanause (1892–1948).

== Bibliography ==
- Eugène De Seyn, Biographical Dictionary of Sciences, Letters and the Arts in Belgium, Brussels, 1935, first volume, p. 148.
- Paul Legrain, Dictionary of the Belgians, Brussels, 1981, p. 89.
- Paul Piron, Dictionary of Belgian visual artists of the 19th and 20th centuries, Ohain-Lasne, 2003, tome I, p. 231.
- Didier Paternoster, “Cocq, Suzanne”, in: Dictionary of Brussels History, Brussels, 2013, p. 184-185.
