= Anna Bass =

French sculptor

- Born: December 24, 1876; Strasbourg, France
- Died: August 27, 1961 (aged 84); Paris XV°, France
- Citizenship: French
- Occupation: Sculptor

Anna Bass (24 December 1876 – 27 August 1961) was a French sculptor born in Strasbourg.

At a special exhibition of Alsace artists at the Paris Salon in 1920, Bass exhibited one terracotta and two bronze sculptures. In 1927 her works were in the collections of the Luxembourg Gallery, Paris and the Strasbourg Museum.

== Biography ==
A member of the Salon de la Société nationale des beaux-arts, the Salon des Tuileries, and the Salon d'Automne, she participated in the February 1937 Grande Exposition, Women Artists of Europe Exhibit at the Jeu de Paume. She also exhibited in numerous Parisian galleries.

His works are held, among other places, at the Georges Pompidou National Museum of Modern Art and the Petit Palais. According to Édouard-Joseph’s Biographical Dictionary of Contemporary Artists, they were once on display at the Musée du Luxembourg and the Museums of Fine Arts in Musée des Beaux-Arts de Strasbourg, as well as at the British Museum in London.

She participates in group exhibitions organized by the Society of Modern Women Artists (FAM), founded in 1931 by Marie-Anne Camax-Zoegger.

Anna Bass is a sculptor—her War Memorial in Bastelica is her best-known work—as well as a medalist and Engraving.
