= Maria Signorelli =

Italian puppet master (1908–1992)

- Born: 17 November 19088; Rome, Italy
- Died: 9 July 1992 (aged 83); Rome, Italy
- Occupations: Puppeteer and Collector
- Spouse: Luigi Volpicelli
- Children: Giuseppina Volpicelli (daughter)
- Parents: Angelo Signorelli (1876–1952) (father); Olga Resnevič (1883–1973) (mother)

Maria Signorelli (Rome, 17 November 1908 – Rome, 9 July 1992) was an Italian puppet master known for her creations as well as for her sets and costume designs, and valuable collection of puppets.

== Biography ==
Maria Signorelli was the first of three daughters born to the radiologist and art collector Angelo Signorelli (1876–1952) and Olga Resnevič (1883–1973), a Latvian physician and writer, translator of Fydor Dostoevsky, and writer of the first biography about Italian actor Eleonora Duse.

Maria grew up in a stimulating family environment, in close contact with the artists and patrons of theater and literature who often frequented the family home in Rome. Signorelli's father made a habit of helping young artists, taking care of them for free and purchasing or subsidizing their works. He was also one of the main financiers of the Teatro dei Piccoli, led by Vittorio Podrecca, who specialized in the use of puppets and who later became a collaborator protecting Maria Signorelli's valuable puppet collection.

=== Education ===
After completing her classical studies, Maria enrolled in the Accademia di Belle Arti of Rome and began to attend the scenography studio of the Royal Theater, directed at that time by Nicola Benois. Maria's passion for drawing, color, and theater led her to create her first puppets, soft sculptures that were exhibited for the first time in 1929 at the Casa d'Arte by Anton Giulio Bragaglia. A subsequent exhibition was held at the Galleria Zak in Paris, presented by de Chirico, followed a long stay in Berlin where her work was the subject of yet another exhibition at the Galeria Gurlitt.

In 1939 Maria married the educator Luigi Volpicelli and they had at least one child, Giuseppina Volpicelli, who later became the caretaker of her mother's collection and arranged numerous exhibitions of her work.

In 1947 Maria Signorelli founded her own company L'Opera dei Burattini, whose actors, painters, scene designers, composers and filmmakers collaborated over time, bringing life to a poetic repertoire.

=== Performances ===
For radio audiences, she organized and conducted several broadcasts (Perpetual motion, 1953-54; Giochiamo al teatro, 1967-68) and television shows (Gala evening at the Teatro dei Burattini, 1958; Little magical world, 1959; Afternoon at the Opera, 1960).

=== Death ===
Maria Signorelli died in Rome on 9 July 1992.

== The Maria Signorelli collection ==
Collecting became a passion for Signorelli, and her collection, in turn, allowed her to set up exhibitions in Italy and abroad to display puppetry for all ages. Over many years, she built one of the most important private collections in Europe, made up of thousands of pieces, some made by herself and some from others all over the world: puppets, silhouettes for shadow shows, Sicilian puppets, dolls, rolls of scenarios, placards and posters, slides, photographs, games, kites, scripts, musical scores and various documents.

== Selected exhibitions ==
Signorelli's work was the subject of numerous exhibitions in Italy and around the world.

- Plastic figures by Maria Signorelli, Casa d'Arte Bragaglia, Rome, 1929
- Les phantoms of M. Signorelli, Galerie Zak, Paris, 1930
- Maria Signorelli, Galerie Gurlitt, Berlin, 1932
- Maria Signorelli Art Room of "La Nazione", Florence, 1933
- 35th Exhibition of the Amici dell'Arte – silver medal, Turin, 1934
- Exposition Italian escenotecnica (by A. G. Bragaglia), Buenos Aires, 1935
- Littoriali art exhibition, Rome, 1935
- VI Triennale, Milan, 1936
- Exhibition of the female artists of Europe, Paris, 1937
- Exhibition of figurines and scenographers, Florence, 1942
- Exhibition International scenography, promoted by the magazine "Teatro", Rome, 1946
- Italian scenography exhibition, Bern, 1947
- Italian scenography abroad, Brussels, 1951 (edited by E. Prampolini)
- Exhibition of Figurative Arts and Contemporary Artists, Rome, 1958

== Selected publications ==
She was an author of several books, including the following.

- The child and the theater (translated by Myrtha Alicia Roquette) Buenos Aires (1963)
- The puppeteer game (1975)
- Homemade musical instruments (1977)
- History and technique of the shadow theater (1981)

== External sources ==
- Patrizia Veroli and Giuseppina Volpicelli, Marionettes and scenic materials from the Signorelli Collection, Bologna, Bora, 2006.
- Gabriella Manna (ed.), The Prince and his Shadow Puppets and Marionettes between East and West from the Collection of Maria Signorelli, Rome, Gangemi publisher, 2014, ISBN 88-492-2813-9.
