= Marguerite Frey-Surbek =

Swiss painter and activist (1886–1981)

- Born: 1886
- Died: 1981 (aged 94–95)
- Movement: Impressionism, Fauvism, Nabis

Marguerite Frey-Surbek (1886–1981), was a Swiss painter and activist.

== Biography ==
Jeanne Marguerite Frey was the daughter of Jean-Albert Frey, a forester and descendant of a family of Basel councilors, and Lisa Juliette Calame. During her early years, she grew up in Delémont. The family moved to Bern in 1893. She attended the School of Arts and Crafts for two years and then became a pupil of the Swiss-German painter Paul Klee from 1904 to 1906.

On the advice of Paul Klee, she entered the Ranson Academy from 1906 to 1911, where she met the artists Lucien Simon, Félix Vallotton, Maurice Denis and Édouard Vuillard. She also met her future husband, the painter Victor Surbek. The couple married in 1914. From 1915 to 1931, they ran a school of painting together in Bern, where Serge Brignoni, Max Böhlen and Ernst Braker taught.

Marguerite Frey-Surbek was socially and politically committed. She founded the first day-care center for girls in Berne and campaigned for women's suffrage. During the war, she helped in the refugee camps and campaigned for the protection of Bern's old town and for the preservation of the environment around Lake Brienz.

== Artistic career ==
In her early years, Marguerite Frey painted mainly portraits and nudes, as well as landscapes and still lifes. Her works included frescoes and murals. Through her graphic works and oil paintings, the artist expressed her interest in the Impressionist, Fauvist and Nabis movements.

In spring and summer she lived in Iseltwald on Lake Brienz, the rest of the year she lived in Bern. She traveled for long periods in other European countries and in America. She is strongly influenced by her stay in Calabria in 1932, which enabled her to find new color tones. In Bern, Marguerite Frey painted frescoes in the stairwell of the Gewerbeschule Bern.

From 1942 to 1948, Marguerite Frey-Surbek was a member of the Federal Art Commission (EKK). She was also a member of the Bernese section of the Swiss Society of Women Artists (SGBK).
