= Dimitrie Serafim =

Romanian Academic and impressionist painter

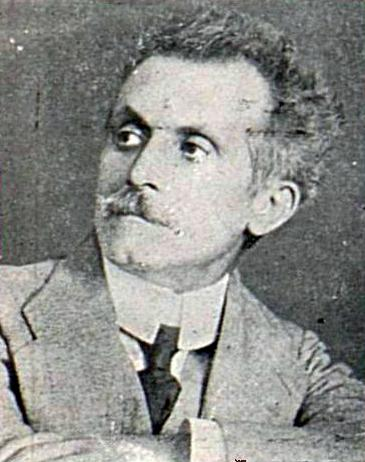
- Minerva's calendar, 1912
- Born: 1862; Bucharest
- Died: 1931 (aged 68–69)
- Education: Académie Julian in Paris
- Occupation: Painter
- Father: Anton Serafim (1838-1911)

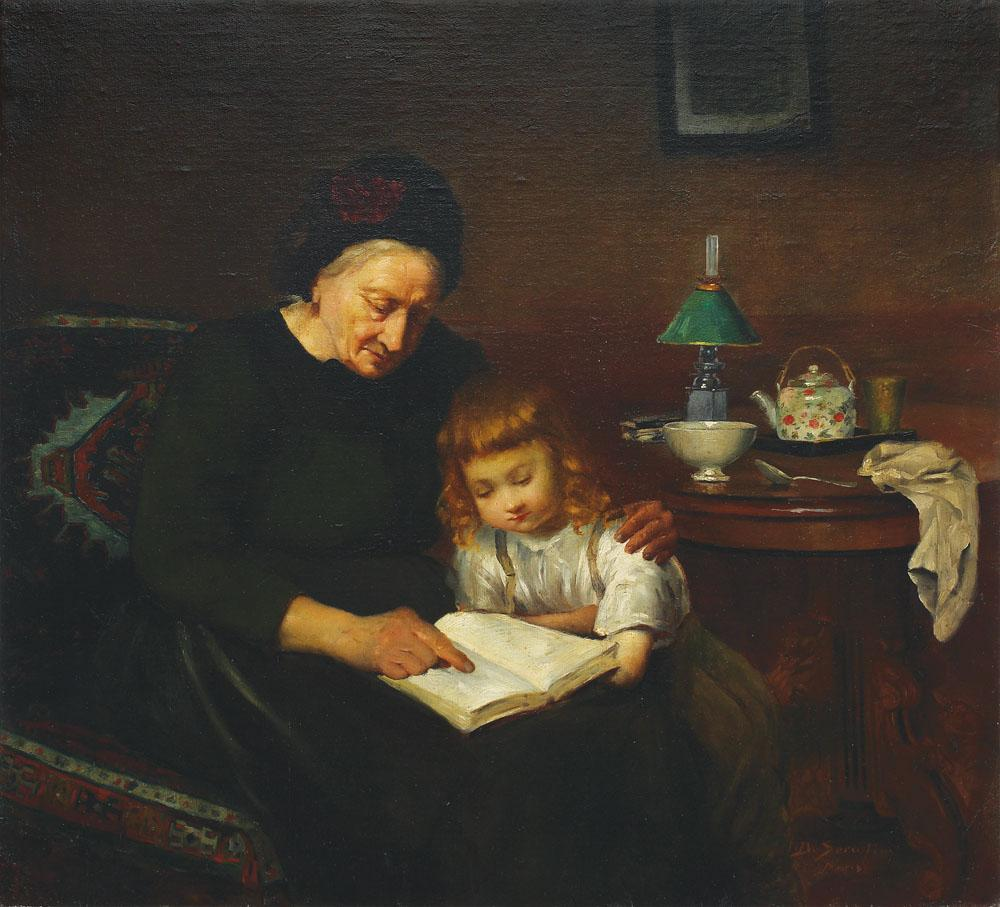
Bedtime Story

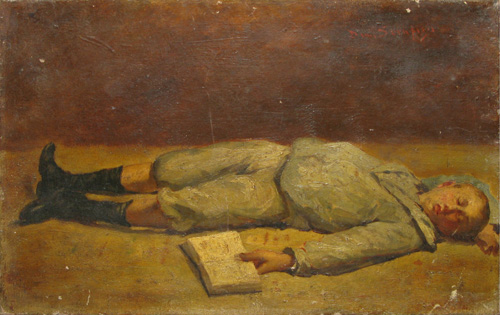
Sloth

Dimitrie Serafim (1862 – 1931) was a Romanian painter in the Academic and Impressionist styles.

== Biography ==
Serafim was born in Bucharest. His father, Anton Serafim (1838–1911) was a church painter of aromanian ancestry who originally came from Varna. His two brothers also became church painters.

From 1882 to 1888, he studied in Bucharest with Theodor Aman and Gheorghe Tattarescu, After failing to receive a scholarship, his family provided him with an allowance to study at the Académie Julian in Paris. In 1892, he exhibited at the first "Salon de Arta Românească", finally receiving a stipend that enabled him to return to Paris, where he worked with Jean-Léon Gérôme and Jean-Jacques Henner.

Under the influence of Tattarescu and Nicolae Grigorescu, he had focused on Impressionism, but his later studies turned him to the Academic style and he began to favor large canvases on mythological themes. Many of his post-Paris works have been characterized as "L'art pompier".

After 1901, he was a professor at the "Academia de Arte Frumoase" (now the Universitatea Națională de Arte București), but was apparently not a particularly distinguished teacher. His paintings were later criticized by Petru Comarnescu for their "excessive pathos". Very few of his works are in museums.
