= Lucie Jacquart =

Belgian artist (1882–1956)

- Born: 1882
- Died: 1956 (aged 73–74); Brussels, Belgium
- Known for: Painting
- Movement: Still Life Painting

Lucie Jacquart (1882–1956) was a Belgian artist who lived and worked in Brussels. She is known for her still life paintings. Her work 'White Azalea' is in the collection of the Royal Museums of Fine Arts of Belgium, and other works are in the collections of the Museum of Fine Arts (Ghent) and of the Belgian state.

Her work has been auctioned off several times, but only one artwork has been sold, this was Still Life with Fan and Flowers, which grossed US$379 at Bernaerts Auctioneers in 2013.
