= Ipolit Strâmbu =

Romanian painter (1871–1934)

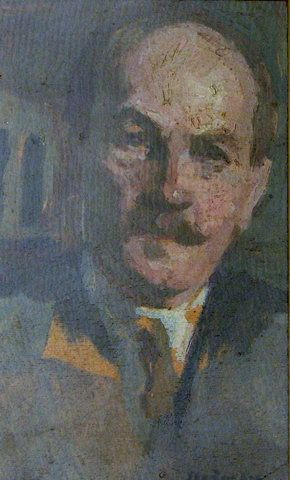
Self-portrait (date unknown)

Ipolit Strâmbulescu, known as Ipolit Strâmbu (18 May 1871 – 31 October 1934), was a Romanian painter best known for his portraits of women, which ranged from domestic scenes to nudes.

== Biography ==
He was born in Bratilovu, Mehedinți County. He was the son of a shepherd and became interested in drawing while attending the local schools. His first formal lessons were with Theodor Aman and George Demetrescu Mirea at the "National School of Fine Arts" (now known as the Bucharest National University of Arts). In 1891, Nicolae Grigorescu encouraged him to create some paintings for an exhibition at the Romanian Athenaeum and became his patron. Four years later, Strâmbu graduated from the academy and became a freelance painter.

His income was insufficient, so he entered a competition to become a professor of drawing at the gymnasium in Craiova. He taught there briefly, then was awarded a scholarship to go to Munich, where he studied with Carl von Marr at the Academy of Fine Arts. In 1900, he went to Paris, where he participated in the Exposition Universelle.

In 1901, he became a professor at the National School. Later that year, together with Ștefan Luchian, Nicolae Vermont and several others, he helped establish "Tinerimea Artistică" (artistic youth) an organization that advocated realistic art, with ordinary people and peasant life as subjects.

He continued to paint prolifically and exhibit widely throughout the 1910s and 20s; including displays at the Venice Biennale of 1924 and the International Exposition of Modern Industrial and Decorative Arts of 1925, in Paris. He also taught at the school in the artists' colony at Baia Mare, authored several textbooks and drawing manuals and was one of the organizers of the "Muzeul Național de Artă Populară" (folk art museum).

Strâmbu died on 31 October 1934 in Bucharest. Although his conservative style of painting had ceased to be popular by the time of his death, major retrospectives have been held twice; at the Craiova Art Museum in 1971 and the Art Museum of Drobeta-Turnu Severin in 1984.

== Selected paintings ==
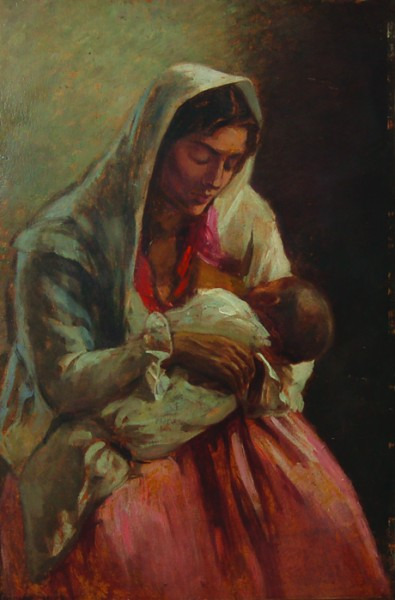
Maternity

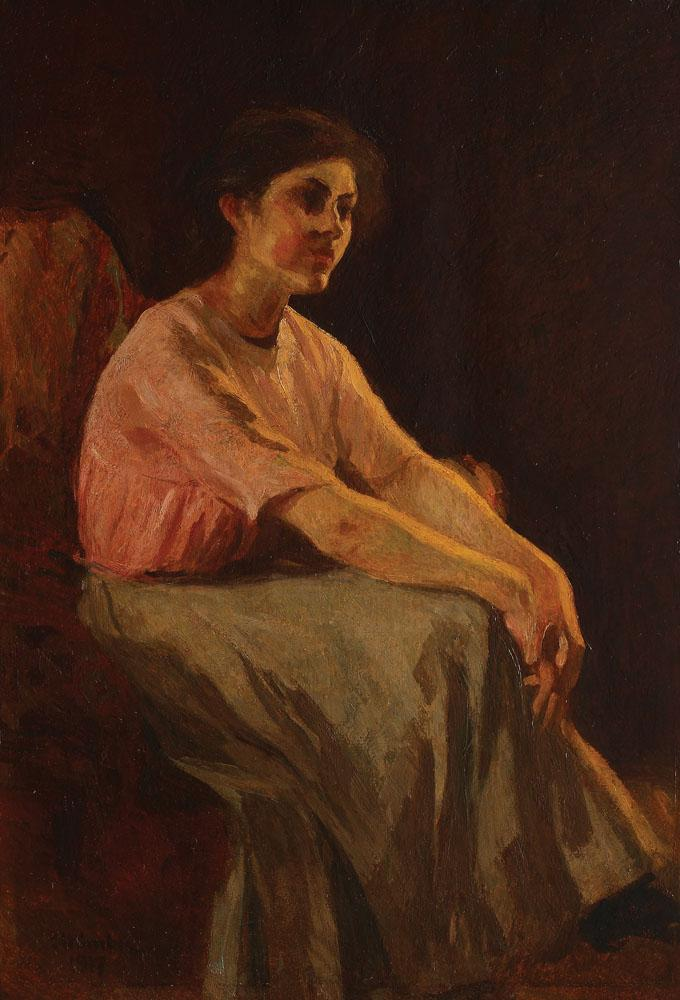
Second Thoughts

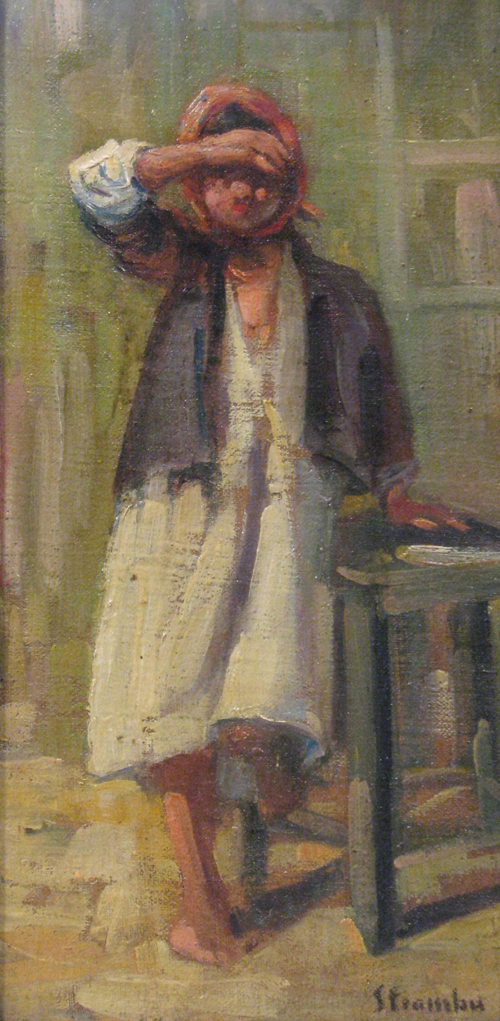
Country Girl

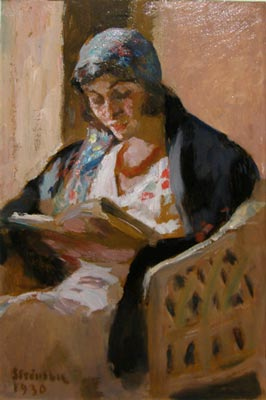
Young Woman Reading

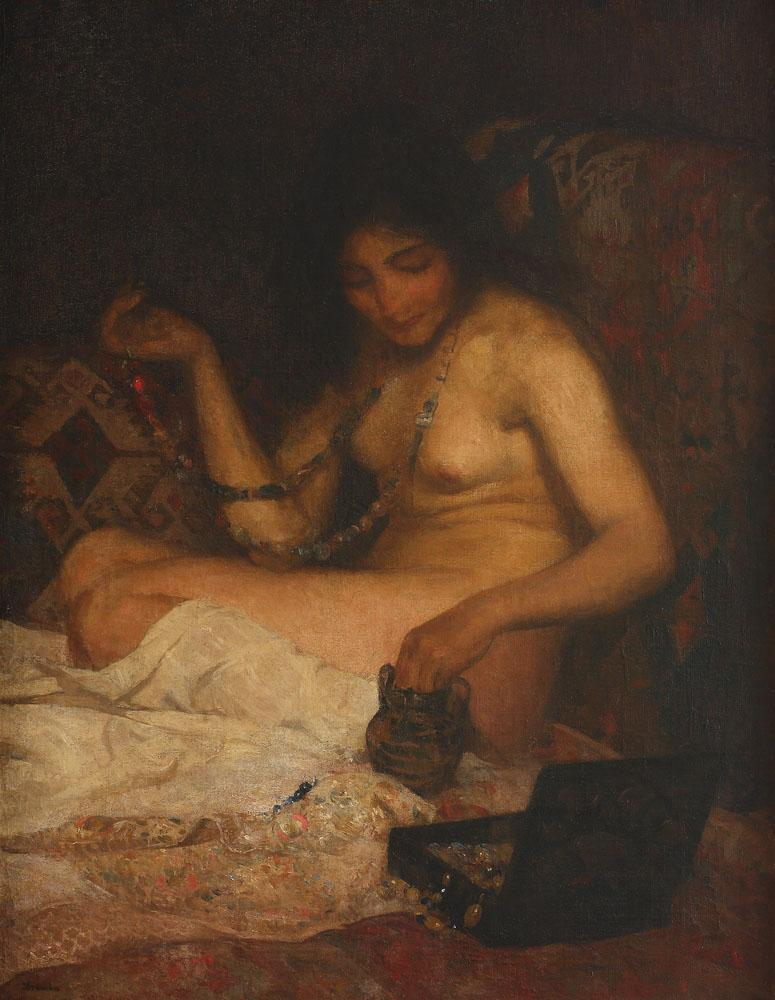
Coquetry
