= Jeanne Bardey =

French sculptor

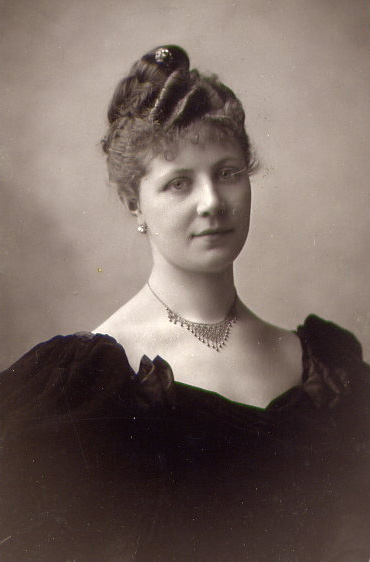
- Born: April 12, 1872; France
- Died: October 13, 1954 (aged 82)
- Known for: Sculptor
- Patrons: Auguste Rodin

Jeanne Bardey (April 12, 1872 – October 13, 1954) was a French painter and sculptor who lived in Lyon.

She was born in Lyon. She is known for being the last student of Auguste Rodin. In 1916, Rodin described Jeanne Bardey as his heir, but his last wishes were not respected, and she was removed from his legacy. More than 600 of her sculptures are contained in the collections of the Museum of Fine Arts of Lyon. Other pieces are held by the Musée d'Orsay. Bardey had a daughter, Henriette.

== Sources ==
- Camille Mauclair, "Madame Bardey", in Art et les Artistes, 1913. (in French)
- Roger Marx, "Peintres-graveurs contemporains : Mme Jeanne Bardey", in La Gazette des beaux-arts, 1913. (in French)
- Hubert Thiolier, Peintres lyonnais intimistes : Guiguet, Garraud, Degabriel, J. Bardey amie de Rodin, Bron, H. Thiolier, 1987. (in French)
- Hubert Thiolier, Jeanne Bardey et Rodin : Une élève passionnée; La bataille du musée Rodin, Bron, H. Thiolier, 1990, ISBN 2950483534. (in French)
- André Vessot, "Jeanne Bardey, dernière élève d'Auguste Rodin", in Histoire-généalogie : Magazine web, 2011-2013. (in French)
