= Alfred Jean Halou =

French sculptor

Alfred Jean Halou (b. Blois 1875, d. Paris 1939) was a French sculptor.

He followed the class of Alexandre Falguière at the École des Beaux Arts and was also a pupil of Auguste Rodin. He was then part of the band named "la bande à Schnegg", including Lucien Schnegg, Antoine Bourdelle, Charles Despiau, Robert Wlérick, Léon-Ernest Drivier, François Pompon, Louis Dejean, Charles Malfray, Auguste de Niederhausern, Henry Arnold, Jane Poupelet and Yvonne Serruys.

== Main works ==
- The 1870 monument commemorating the War, in Blois
- Ronde-Bosse, statue, a young woman kneeling, Saint-Maurice, Val-de-Marne
