= Louis Dejean (sculptor) =

French sculptor and engraver

Louis Dejean (June 9, 1872 in Paris – January 6, 1953 in Paris), was a French sculptor and engraver. He worked in the workshop of Gaston Schnegg, along with Antoine Bourdelle, Charles Despiau, Robert Wlérick, Léon-Ernest Drivier, François Pompon, Alfred Jean Halou, Charles Malfray, Auguste de Niederhausern, Henry Arnold, Jane Poupelet and Yvonne Serruys.

== Works ==
- La Parisienne, Dame au grand manteau. Sculpture (Statuette), dimensions: 27 cm x 45 cm x 34 cm. Date: 1904. Musée d'Orsay, first floor - Section 57. Acquisition: Procurement service to living artists (1904)
- Bronze medal from the Carnegie Endowment for International Peace, 1909. Dimensions 80 x 52 mm, weight 195 grams.
- Muse elongated, outer stone sculpture (1937 order). Exposition Internationale des Arts et Techniques dans la Vie Moderne : 1937. Musée d'Art Moderne de la Ville de Paris, avenue de New York, Paris XVI (France)
