= Reutlingen =

City in Germany, known for narrowest street

Reutlingen Reitlenga (Swabian)
- Town
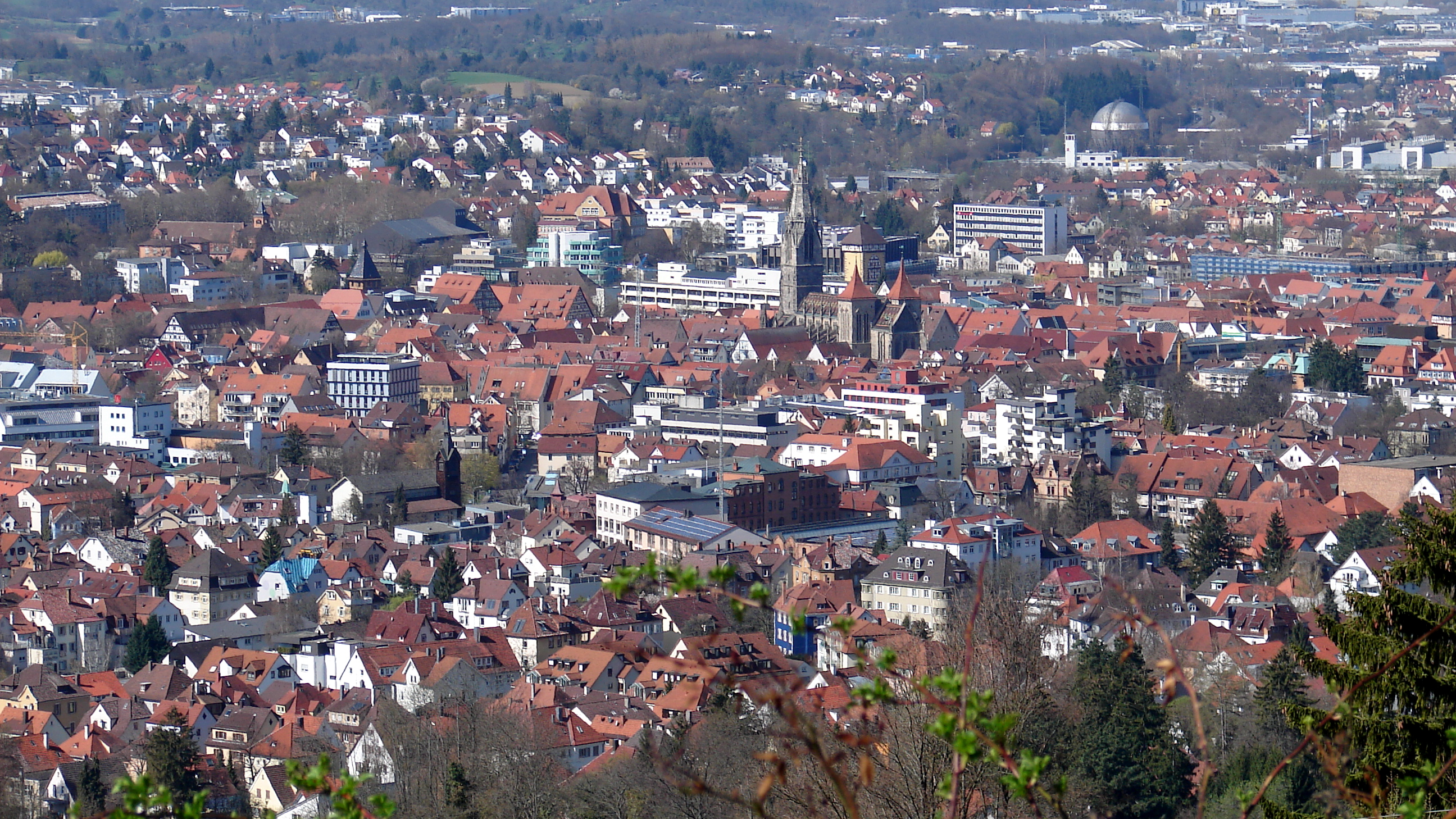
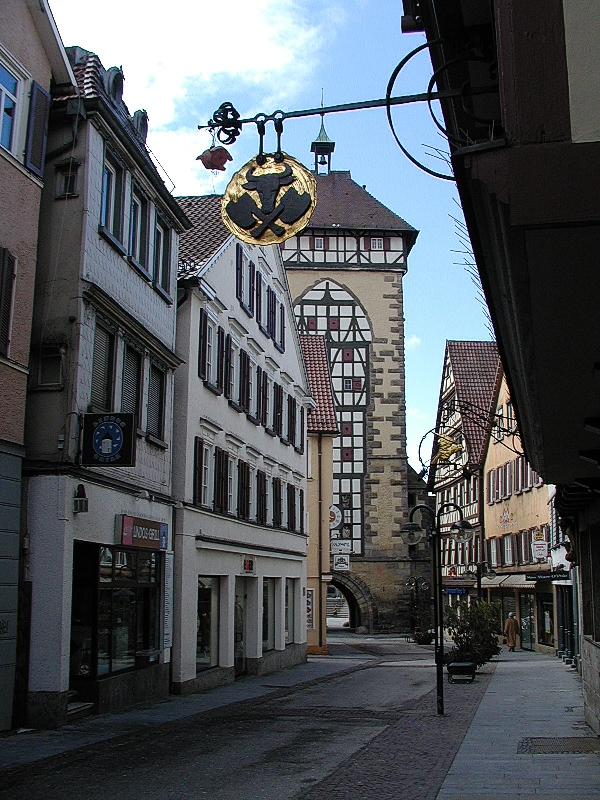
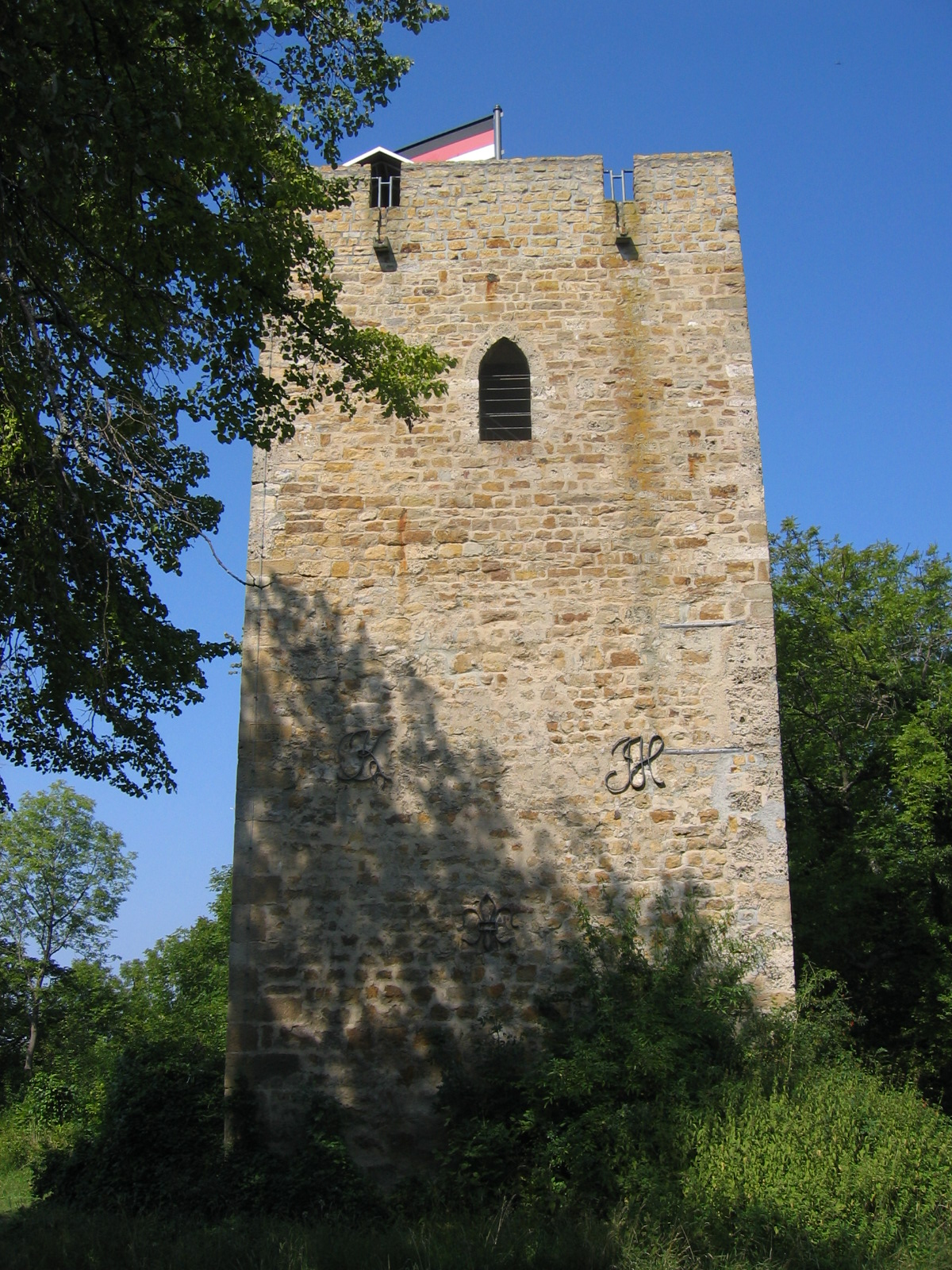
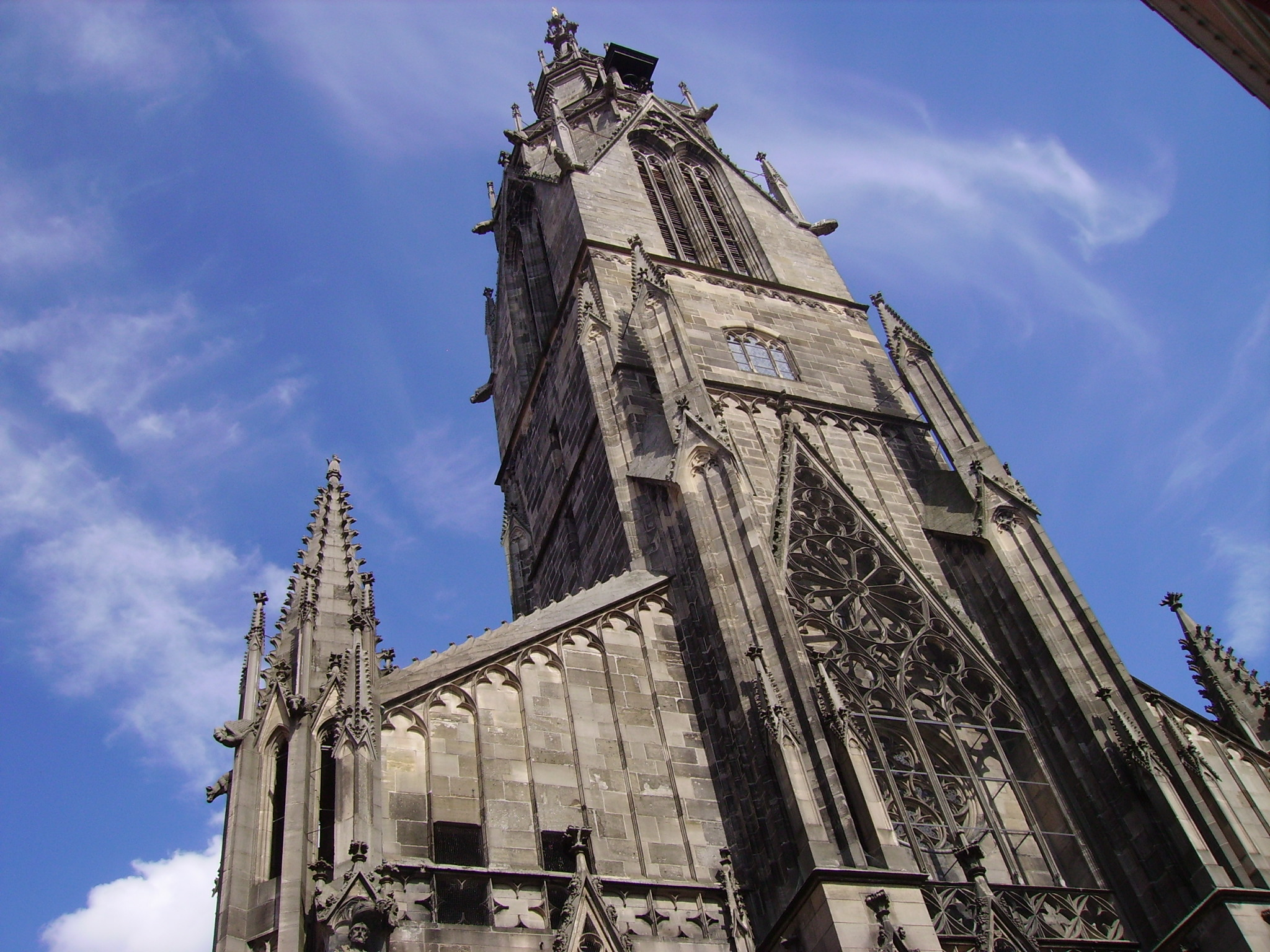
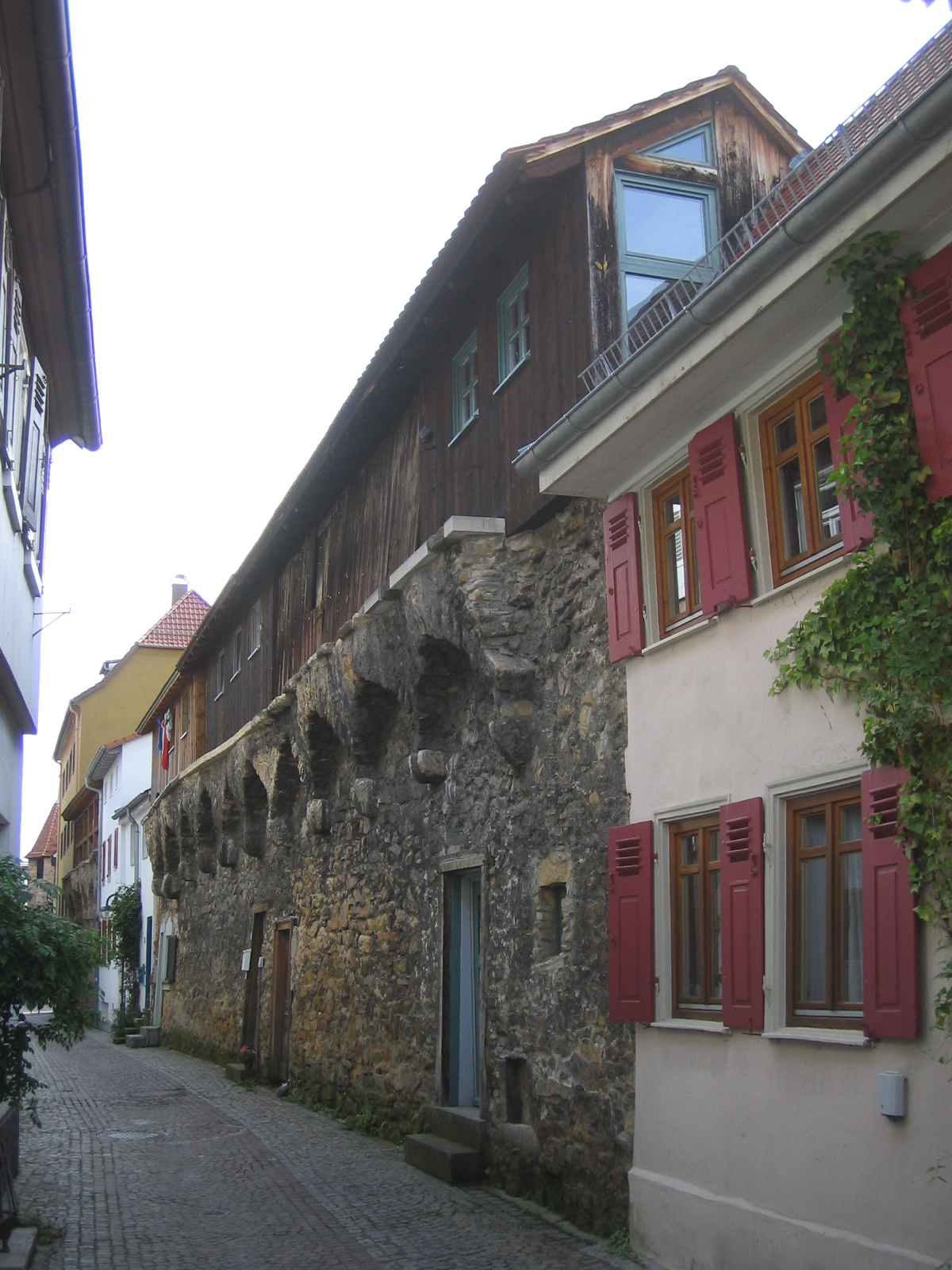
- Old town Tübinger Tor Achalm Castle St. Mary's Church Town wall

- Flag Coat of arms

- Location of Reutlingen within Reutlingen district
- Interactive map of Reutlingen
- Location within Germany Location within Baden-Württemberg
- Coordinates: 48°29′N 9°13′E
- Country: Germany
- State: Baden-Württemberg
- District: Reutlingen

Government
  - Mayor (2019–27): Thomas Keck (SPD)

Area
  - Total: 87.04 km^{2} (33.61 sq mi)
- Elevation: 382 m (1,253 ft)

Population (2025-12-31)
  - Total: 119,040
  - Density: 1,368/km^{2} (3,542/sq mi)
- Time zone: UTC+01:00 (CET)
  - Summer (DST): UTC+02:00 (CEST)
- Postal codes: 72760..72770
- Dialling codes: 07121, 07072, 07127
- Vehicle registration: RT
- Website: www.reutlingen.de

Reutlingen (German: [ˈʁɔʏtlɪŋən]; Swabian: Reitlenga) is a city in Baden-Württemberg, Germany. It is the capital of the eponymous district of Reutlingen. As of June 2018, it had an estimated population of 116,456. Reutlingen has a university of applied sciences, which was founded in 1855, originally as a weavers' school. Today, Reutlingen is home to an established textile industry and also houses machinery, leather goods and steel manufacturing facilities. It has the narrowest street in the world, Spreuerhofstraße (width 31 cm).

== Geography ==
Reutlingen is located about 35 km (22 mi) south of the State capital of Baden-Württemberg, Stuttgart. It lies in the Southwest corner of Germany, right next to the Swabian Jura, and that is why it is often called The gateway to the Swabian Jura (German: Das Tor zur Schwäbischen Alb). The Echaz river, a tributary of the Neckar, flows through the city centre.

Along with the old university town of Tübingen (about 15 km (9.3 mi) to the west), Reutlingen is the centre of the Neckar-Alb region. It is also part of the larger Stuttgart Metropolitan Region.

=== Climate ===
Climate data for Reutlingen (1991–2020)
Month	Jan	Feb	Mar	Apr	May	Jun	Jul	Aug	Sep	Oct	Nov	Dec	Year
Daily mean °C (°F)	1.2 (34.2)	2.2 (36.0)	5.9 (42.6)	10.0 (50.0)	14.1 (57.4)	17.6 (63.7)	19.4 (66.9)	18.9 (66.0)	14.5 (58.1)	10.0 (50.0)	5.2 (41.4)	2.2 (36.0)	10.1 (50.2)
Average precipitation mm (inches)	43.3 (1.70)	39.0 (1.54)	48.2 (1.90)	48.8 (1.92)	92.1 (3.63)	87.7 (3.45)	96.0 (3.78)	87.0 (3.43)	58.5 (2.30)	60.4 (2.38)	56.2 (2.21)	53.1 (2.09)	770.3 (30.33)
Mean monthly sunshine hours	61.2	86.5	138.6	179.9	203.3	222.4	240.1	224	167.7	113.1	65.4	52	1,754
Source: Deutscher Wetterdienst

== History ==
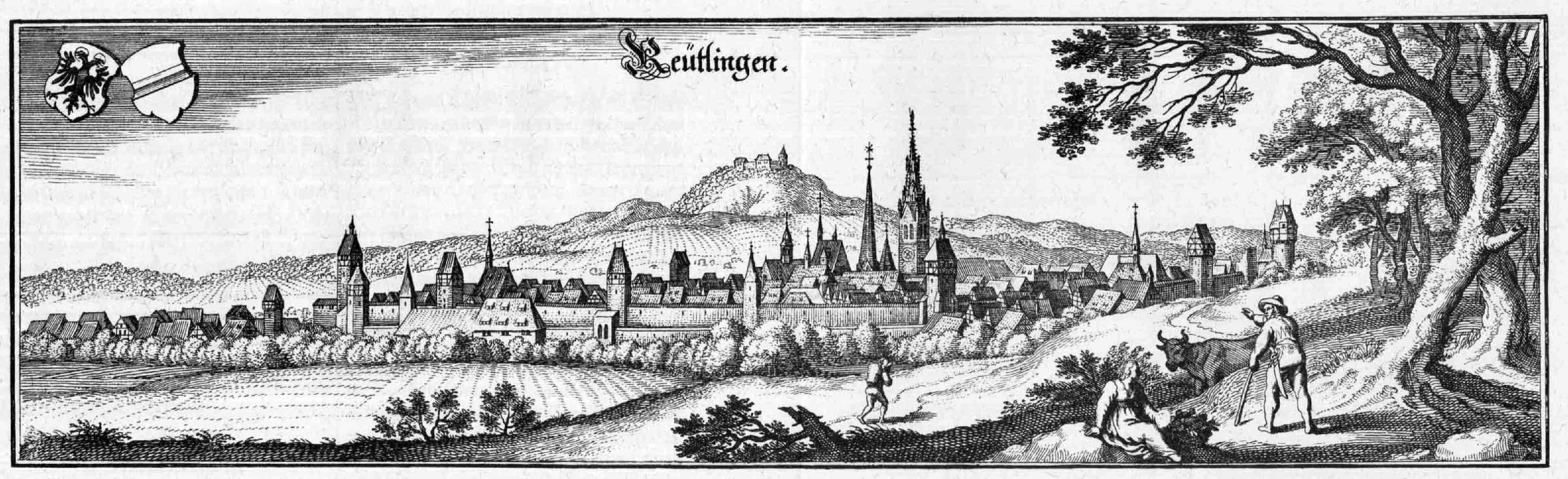
Reütlingen – excerpt from Topographia Sueviae (Swabia), published by Matthäus Merian in 1643

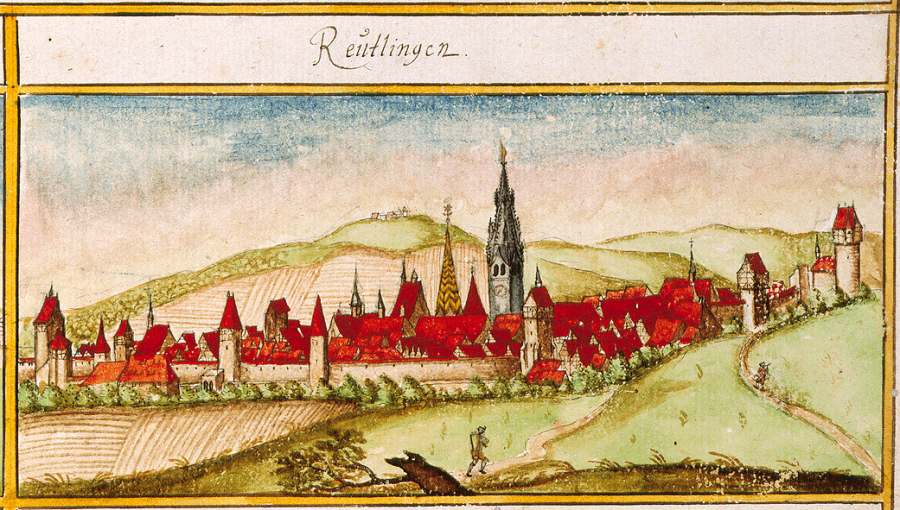
View of Reutlingen from the forest register books created by Andreas Kieser

The first settlements in the area are believed to date from the 4th or 5th century. Some time around 1030, Count Egino started to build a castle on top of the Achalm, one of the largest mountains in Reutlingen district (about 706 m). One of the towers of this castle was rebuilt in the 19th century and is open to visitors. The name Reutlingen was first mentioned in writing in the so-called Bempflingen Treaty (German: Bempflinger Vertrag) which is dated approximately 1089–90.

Reutlingen's earliest documented mention dates back to 1089 in the Bempflingen Treaty, which was an inheritance agreement between Zwiefalten Monastery and the descendants of the Achalm Count. In 1180, Reutlingen was given market privileges by Frederick Barbarossa. The settlement of Reutlingen was likely concentrated around the present-day Katharinenstraße and Untere Wilhelmstraße due to strategic considerations.

Around 1180, Reutlingen received market rights and, between 1220 and 1240 it was promoted to city status and city-walls and fortifications were built. Shortly thereafter, from 1247 to 1343, the city's landmark, the St. Mary's Church (German: Marienkirche) was built.

In 1377 Reutlingen was the scene of a victory by the Swabian League, formed in the previous year by 14 Swabian cities, led by Ulm, over the Count of Württemberg. In 1519, a later Swabian League came to Reutlingen's help when Ulrich, Duke of Württemberg attempted to seize the city; the League landed a crushing blow, conquering Württemberg and selling it to Charles V. In 1495 and 1516 the Jews were exiled from the city.

As a result of such struggles, Reutlingen became an Imperial City of the Holy Roman Empire, free from allegiance to the Duke of Württemberg. In 1530, Reutlingen's city council signed the Augsburg Confession, and in 1580 and the Formula of Concord, key documents of Lutheranism. In 1803, in the wake of the French Revolutionary Wars, Reutlingen lost its independence in the German Mediatisation, being restored to Württemberg.

The worst disaster in the history of Reutlingen happened in 1726, when a major fire swept through the city, destroying 80% of all residential houses and almost all public buildings, and making 1,200 families homeless. The impact of this fire, which lasted three days, is still visible today.

During World War II, the wings of the V-1 flying bomb were manufactured in Reutlingen, making the city the target of several allied bombing raids.

The reconstruction of Reutlingen and its democratization is closely linked to the name Oskar Kalbfells, who was the first democratically elected mayor of the city to shape Reutlingen's political history until 1973 after World War II.

In 1947 Reutlingen came to the newly founded state of Württemberg-Hohenzollern, which merged with the state of Baden-Württemberg in 1952.

On 24 July 2016 a Syrian killed a pregnant woman in a machete attack.

Significant minority groups
Nationality	Population (2018)
Romania	3,173
Turkey	2,594
Greece	2,013
Poland	1,875
Kazakhstan	1,732
Russia	1,391
Italy	1,305
Croatia	960
Bosnia and Herzegovina	955
Syria	726
Serbia	674

== Lord mayors ==
- 1929–1933: Karl Haller
- 1933–1945: Richard Dederer, NSDAP
- 1945–1973: Oskar Kalbfell, SPD
- 1973–1994: Manfred Oechsle, CDU
- 1995–2003: Stefan Schultes, CDU
- 2003–2019: Barbara Bosch, independent
- since 2019 Thomas Keck, SPD

== Transport ==
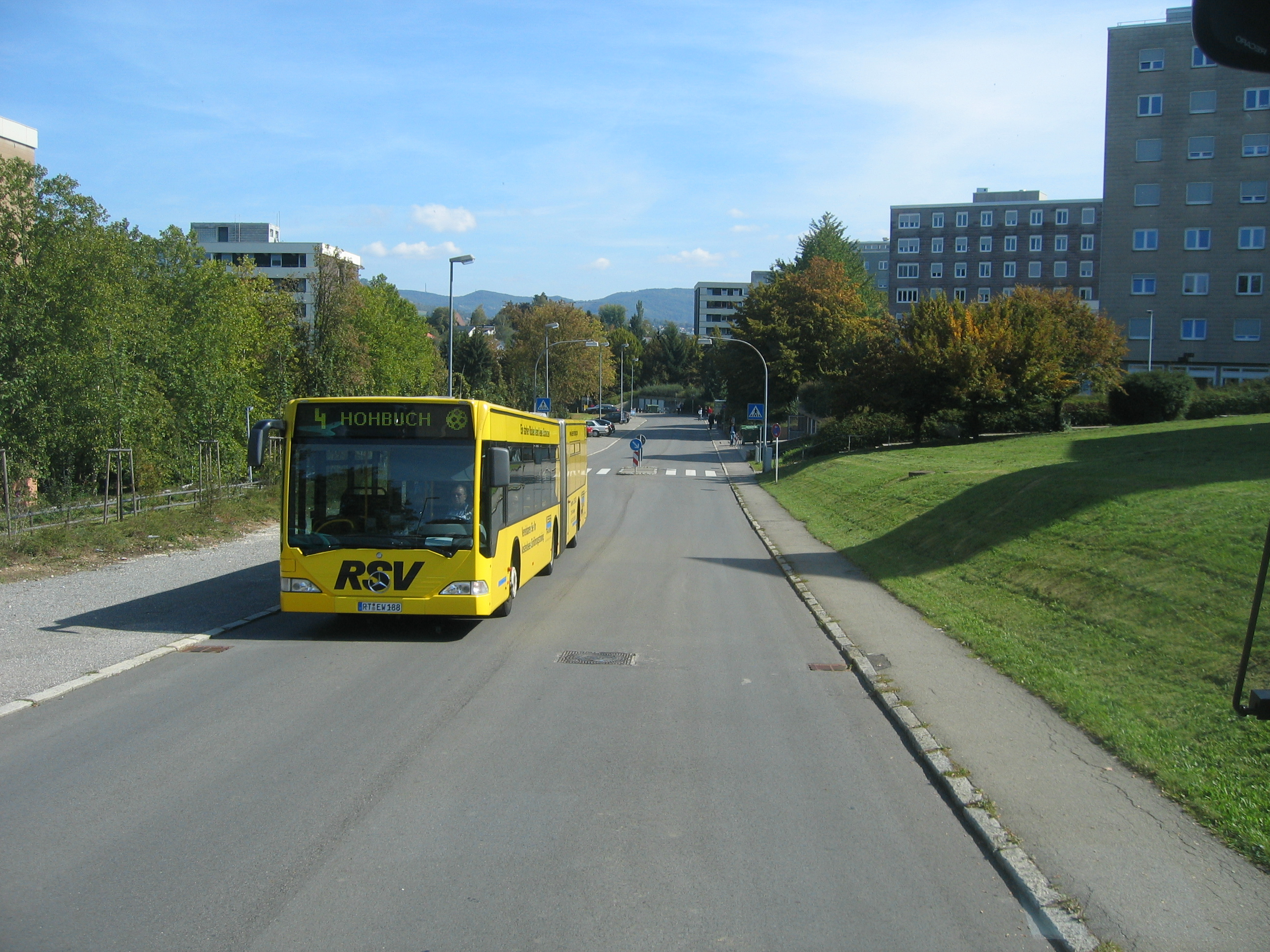
Bus on the Pestalozzi Street

City buses are run by Reutlinger Stadtverkehr (RSV), while trains from Reutlingen Hauptbahnhof and Reutlingen West, Sondelfingen, and Betzingen are run by Deutsche Bahn and Abellio Rail Baden-Württemberg.

== Main sights ==
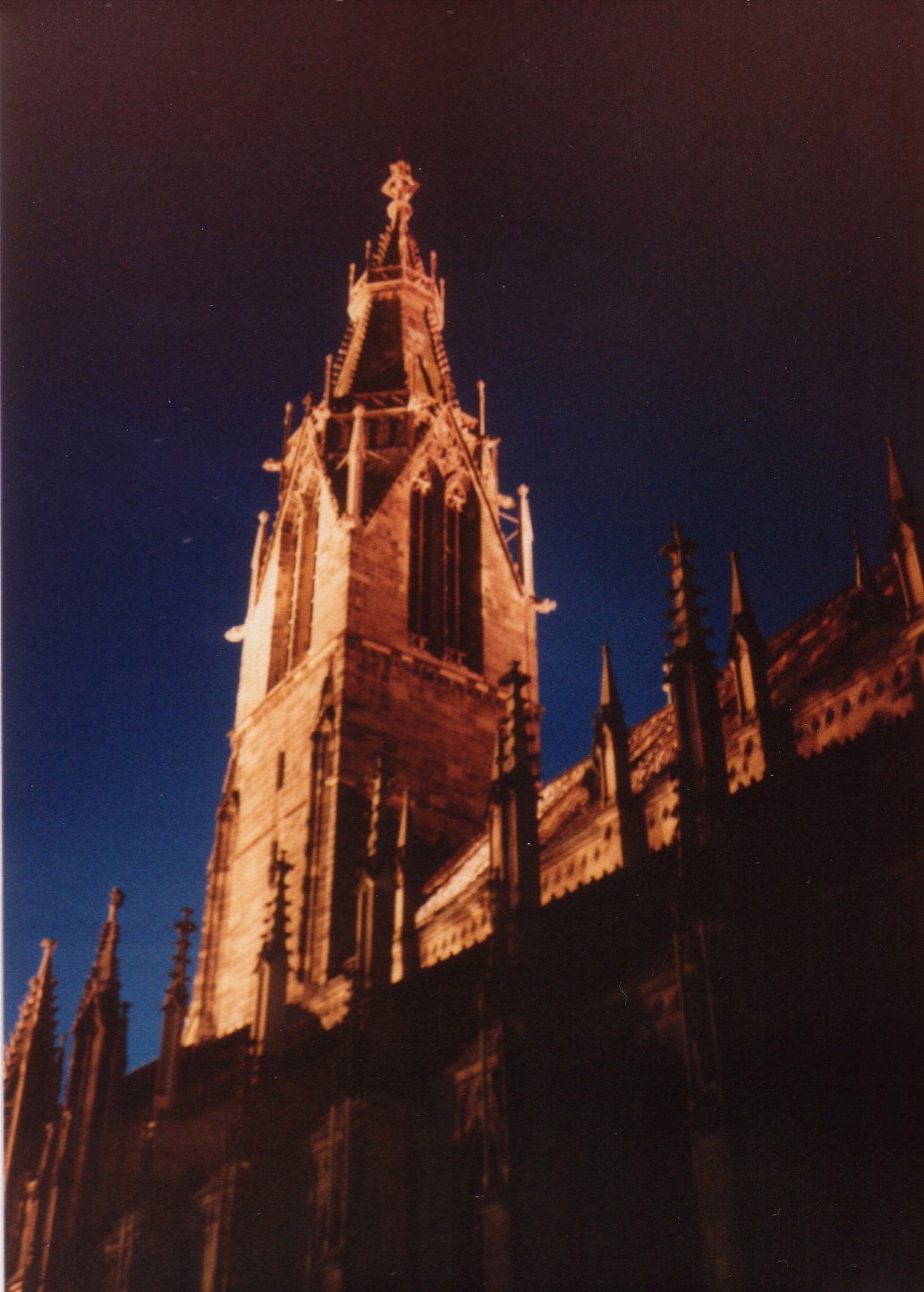
Church of the Virgin Mary by night

- Church of the Virgin Mary, built in Gothic style in the 13th–14th centuries. Nearby is a statue of emperor Frederick II.
- Marktbrunnen ("Market Fountain", 16th century), surmounted by the statue of emperor Maximilian II.
- Spitalhof, built as a hospital in the 14th century. Damaged by a fire, it was largely rebuilt in the 18th century.
- Church of St. Nicholas, built in the 14th century as a chapel.
- Gerber- und Färberbrunnen ("Tanners' and Dyers' Fountain"), 1920.
- City hall, built in 2013.
- Spreuerhofstraße, the world's narrowest street.

== Culture ==
On Mutscheltag (the first Thursday after Epiphany), townspeople gather in halls and homes to play games of dice, the winner of which earns parts or whole Mutschel loaves of bread. The Mutschelspiele (Mutschel games) consist of small games scored by tally marks, and are won both independently and by grand total at the end of the hour or night. This tradition is unique to the city of Reutlingen.

== Education ==
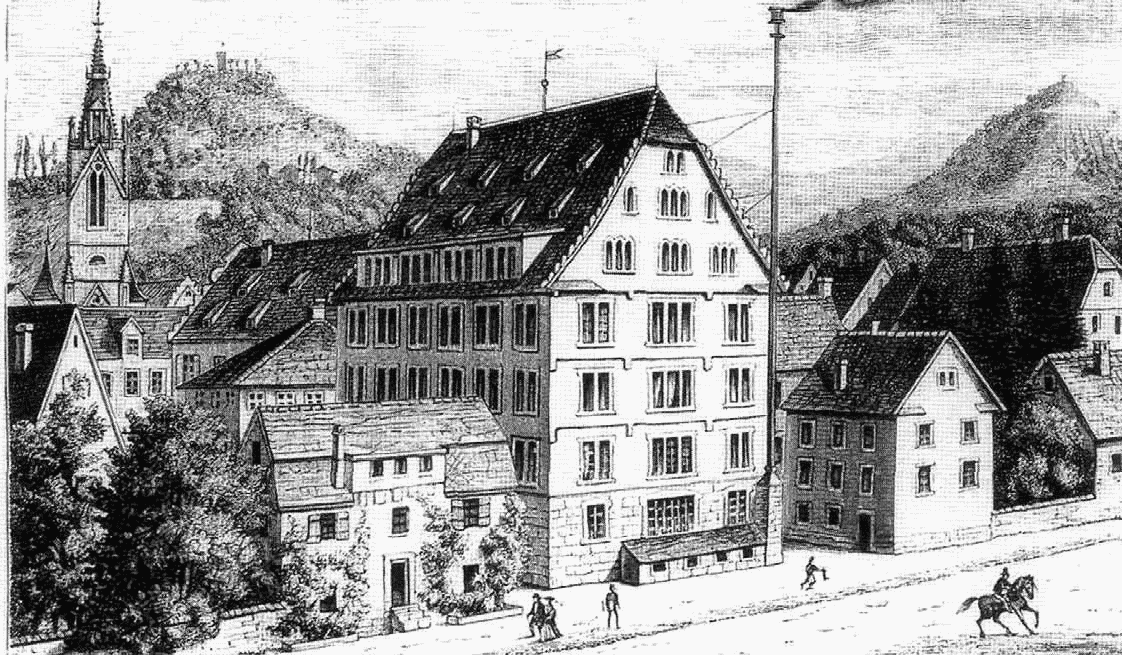
Spendhaus, first home of the weaving school that would become Reutlingen University

Reutlingen University is a university of applied sciences, focusing on hands-on learning, which is apparent in their mandatory internship for all business majors. The university is an internationally friendly school with over 200 university cooperations worldwide. Classes are generally taught in German; however, in some Bachelor programs and in the Master's programs classes are taught in English.

== Twin towns – sister cities ==
Reutlingen is twinned with:

- Aarau, Switzerland (1986)
- Bouaké, Ivory Coast (1970)
- Dushanbe, Tajikistan (1990)
- (United Kingdom) Ellesmere Port, UK (1966)
- Reading, United States (1998)
- Roanne, France (1958)
- Szolnok, Hungary (1990)

== People ==
- Sebastian Gryphius (c. 1492–1556), bookseller, printer and humanist
- Friedrich List (1789–1846), German-American economist
- Alexander Bruckmann (1806–1852), historical and portrait painter
- Hermann Kurz (1813–1873), poet and novelist
- Henry Fox (1833–1906), a German soldier who fought in the American Civil War
- Paul Wilhelm Keller-Reutlingen (1854–1920), landscape and genre painter
- Emanuel Hahn (1881–1957), Canadian sculptor and coin designer, co-founded the Sculptors' Society of Canada
- Ernst Boepple (1887–1950), Nazi official and SS officer executed for war crimes
- Ferdinand Heim (1895–1971), general, the Scapegoat of Stalingrad
- Helmuth Naumer (1907–1990), artist, depicted the landscapes of New Mexico
- Friedrich Schlotterbeck (1909–1979), socialist, resistance fighter and author
- Walter Vielhauer (1909–1986), trade unionist, politician, resistance fighter
- Gertrud Lutz (1910–1944), resistance fighter
- Willy Hack (1912–1952), SS officer and concentration camp official executed for war crimes
- Walter G. Spohn (1914–2003), the founder of the American Anaplastology Association
- Martin Hengel (1926–2009), Protestant parson and historian
- Willi Betz (1927–2015), founder of the Internationale Spedition Willi Betz GmbH& Co. KG
- Friedrich Wilhelm Schnitzler (1928–2011), landowner, business manager and politician (CDU)
- Roland Kayn (1933–2011), organist and composer, wrote lengthy works of cybernetic music
- Ernst Messerschmid (born 1945), astronaut and physicist
- Claus Kleber (born 1955), television journalist
- Dominik Kuhn (born 1969), producer, language artist and comedian

=== Sport ===
- Julius Wagner (1882–1952), team gold medallist in the Tug of war at the 1906 Intercalated Games
- Michael Krumm (born 1970), racing driver
- Stephan Vuckovic (born 1972), triathlon athlete, silver medallist at the 2000 Summer Olympics
- Ole Bischof (born 1979), judoka, gold medallist at Judo at the 2008 Summer Olympics
- Dennis Geiger (born 1984), footballer, played over 250 games
- Tobias Feisthammel (born 1988), footballer, played over 380 games
- Sven Schipplock (born 1988), footballer who has played over 290 games
