= Jane Poupelet =

French sculptor (1874–1932)

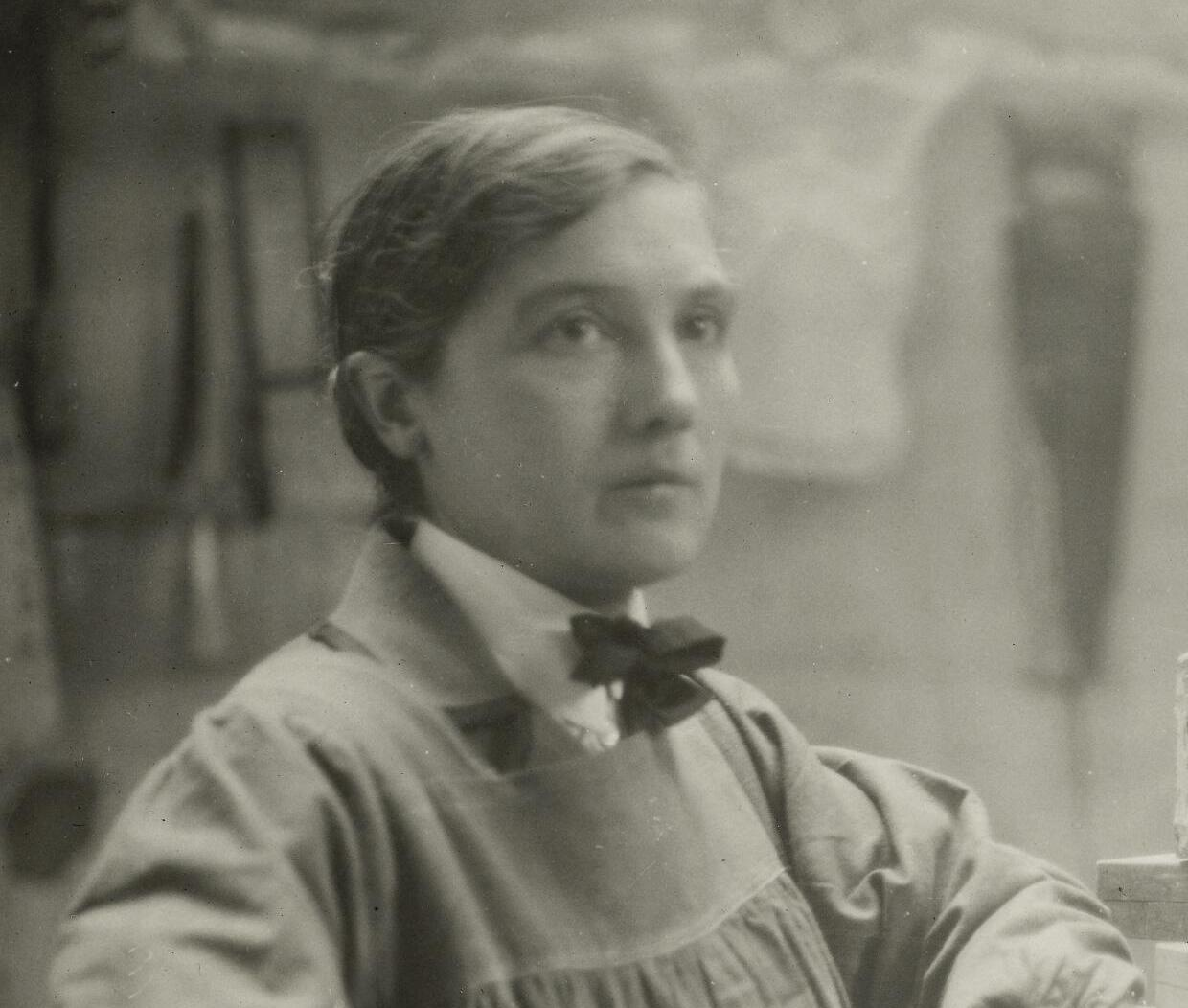
- Born: Marie Marcelle Jane Poupelet; 19 April 1874; Saint-Paul-Lizonne, France
- Died: 17 October 1932 (aged 58); Talence, France
- Known for: Sculpture
- Awards: Knight of the Legion of Honour

Marie Marcelle Jane Poupelet (1874– 1932) was a French sculptor who excelled in animal sculpture and female nudes.

== Early life and education ==
Poupelet was born on 19 April 1874, in Clauzure, a hamlet in Saint-Paul-Lizonne in the Dordogne. Her father was a lawyer and her mother's side was of noble origin, having been royal notaries, paper merchants and tanners. Her grandfather made money as a trader in the Far East. After an early childhood spent at the Château de la Gauterie in Clauzure, she moved with her family to Bordeaux in 1882. She studied at the École des Beaux-Arts in Bordeaux, where she was the first woman to be admitted, simultaneously following the anatomy courses in medical school. In 1892, she earned a teaching diploma in drawing. As her parents, who did not approve of her career, had cut off her financial support, she taught drawing classes and sold her own work, gathering enough money to go to Paris in late 1896. She briefly attended the Académie Julian in Paris, studying in the studio of the sculptor, Denys Puech. She frequented the artistic circles formed around Auguste Rodin and Antoine Bourdelle. A friend of Gaston Schnegg, she also associated with American artists and English-speaking feminist groups. Between 1897 and 1900, she continued her training with the sculptor Lucien Schnegg, brother of Gaston, who created her portrait, now held by the Musée d'Orsay in Paris. Her Schnegg connection also brought her notoriety as part of the "bande à Schnegg" along with Charles Despiau, Alfred Jean Halou, Albert Marque, Robert Wlérick, and the only other woman in the group, a Franco-Belgian, Yvonne Serruys.

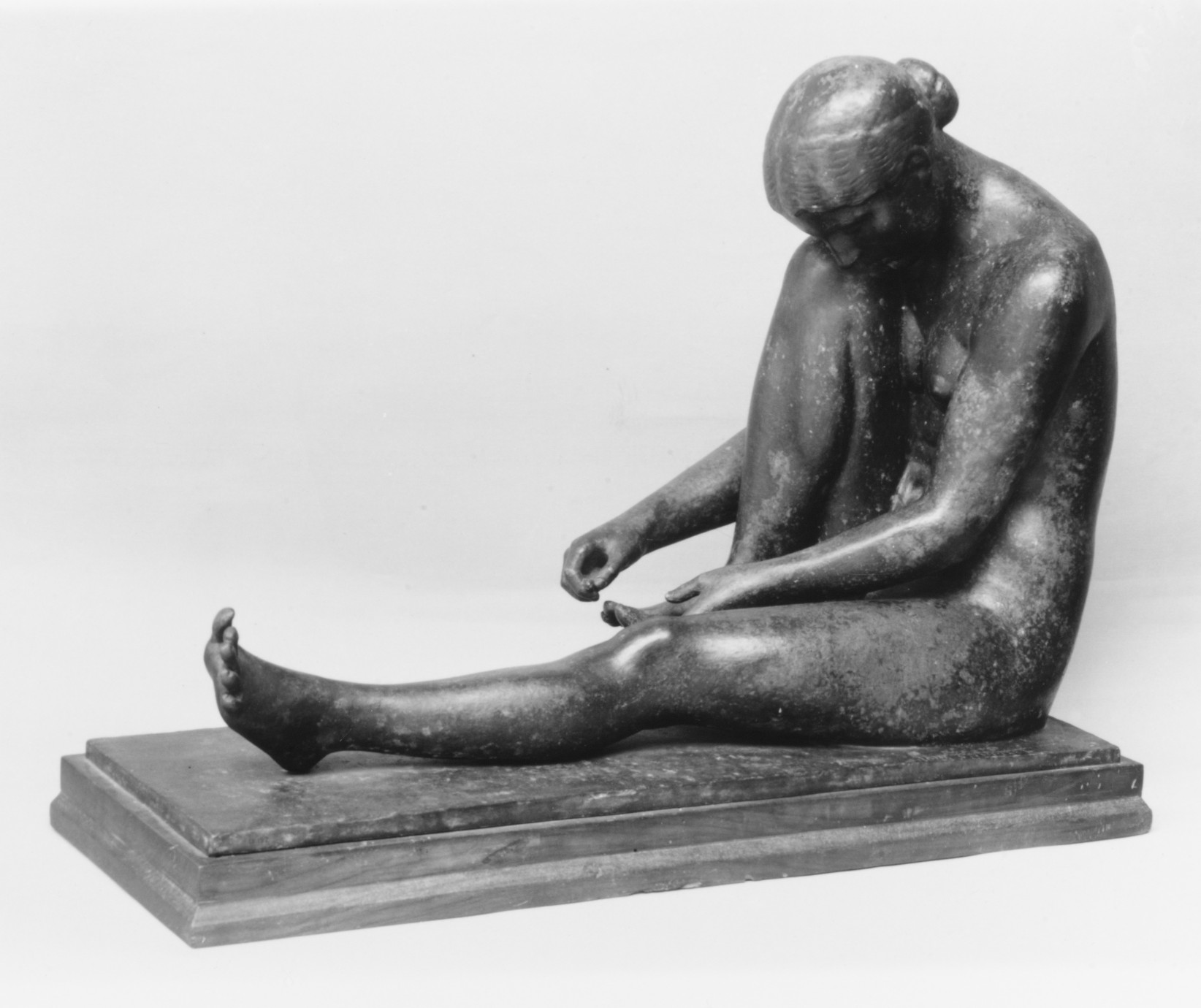
Femme à sa toilette, 1909, Metropolitan Museum of Art, New York

== Artistic Career ==
From 1899 to 1901, Poupelet exhibited at the Salon in Paris under the male pseudonym of Simon de la Vergne. Thus, without knowing she was a woman, the jury awarded her a bronze medal in 1900 for her Decorative Fountain. In 1903, she exhibited under her own name at the Salon de la Société Nationale des Beaux Arts. In 1904, after she had exhibited at the Salon in her own name, the Société Nationale des Beaux-Arts awarded her a travel grant. This programme, established in 1881, allowed young artists to travel abroad to enrich their training and discover new inspiration. She used these funds to travel to Mediterranean countries, notably Italy, Tunisia, Algeria, and Spain. She took inspiration from the sculptures of Pompeii. Throughout her career, she also benefited from the support of the Bureau des Travaux d'Art (Art Works Office), which acquired several of her works for the State. In 1910, her bronze Woman at Her Toilette was purchased after its exhibition at the Georges Petit gallery. In 1913, the poet and art critic Guillaume Apollinaire highlighted her work, Seated Woman At the Water's Edge, exhibited at the Salon de la Sociéte Nationale des Beaux Arts, as being the best sculpture.

During World War I she dedicated herself to making wooden toys for charitable causes. Having volunteered with the American Red Cross, she joined the Studio for Portrait Masks in 1918 where, along with its founder, Anna Coleman Ladd and Robert Wlérick, she modelled masks for disfigured soldiers from photographs. The masks, moulded in wax from the faces, were then reshaped and subsequently cast in copper using the electroplating process and decorated with painted enamel to create the illusion of skin. Between 1917 and 1920, their studio was located at 86 rue Notre-Dame-des-Champs in Paris.

In 1918, she sold another female nude at the Salon du Petit Palais, and a sculpture called Sleeping Woman was sold in 1923 at the Salon des Tuileries. In 1928, a retrospective of her work was held at the Bernier Gallery, where the State purchased a bronze sculpture of a cow, marking the artist's growing recognition. In 1929, two of her drawings were also purchased by the Musée du Luxembourg, on the recommendation of the National Museums Advisory Committee. She was elected president of the Société Nationale des Beaux-Arts in 1921. As vice-president of the Salon des Indépendants, she encouraged many artists, including Aristide Maillol, René Iché, and Mateo Hernández.

== Later life ==
Weakened by "smoker's cancer" in her later years, she abandoned sculpture to devote herself to drawing. She continued to depict animals and female figures in everyday poses. In 1928, she was made a Knight of the Legion of Honour for her work with the Studio of Portrait Masks. In 1932, she founded, with François Pompon, the "Group of Twelve", a collective of twelve painters and sculptors specializing in animal art.

Chat dormant, entre 1900 et 1932, Cleveland Museum of Art

.

== Death and legacy ==
Poupelet died in Talence on 17 October 1932. She was buried in Saint-Paul-Lizonne.

After Poupelet's death in 1932, her sister offered to donate her remaining works to the Louvre Museum. However, a rule stipulated that acquisition of works by the Louvre was not possible until the artist had been dead for a number of years. The works were therefore initially acquired by the Musée du Luxembourg, and a retrospective exhibition was held there in 1935. Some of her work was also exhibited in the retrospective part of Les femmes artistes d'Europe, an exhibition devoted solely to works by women, which was held at the Jeu de Paume in Paris in 1937. The donated works are now part of the collection of the Musée National d'Art Moderne at the Centre Pompidou in Paris. Her work is now also held by museums in Boston, Chicago, Cleveland and New York City, in Prague, and in several regional museums in France.

At least four streets in France bear her name.
