= Maxillofacial prosthetist and technologist =

Prosthetic specialist

Maxillofacial prosthetist and technologist is the term used in the United Kingdom for a specialist who delivers facial, ocular and other prostheses which restore form and function to the body.

In the United States, this specialty is known as anaplastology.

In the UK, the main governing body for the practice of maxillofacial prosthetics is the Institute of Maxillofacial Prosthetics and Technologists.
