= Berga concentration camp =

Subcamp of Buchenwald concentration camp

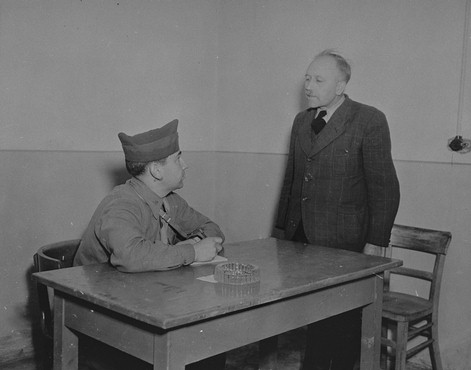
An American soldier questions a civilian from a nearby town in the Berga-Elster concentration camp.

Berga an der Elster was a subcamp of the Buchenwald concentration camp. The Berga forced labour camp was located on the outskirts of the village of Schlieben. Workers were supplied by Buchenwald concentration camp and from a prisoner-of-war camp, Stalag IX-B; the latter contravened the provisions of the Third Geneva Convention and the Hague Treaties. Many prisoners died as a result of malnutrition, sickness (including pulmonary disease due to dust inhalation from tunnelling with explosives), and beatings, including 73 American POWs.

The labor camp formed part of Germany's secret plan to use hydrogenation to transform brown coal into usable fuel for tanks, planes, and other military machinery. However, the camp's additional purpose was Vernichtung durch Arbeit ("extermination through labor"), and prisoners were intentionally worked to death under inhumane working and living conditions, suffering from starvation as a result. This secondary purpose of extermination was carried out until the war's end, when the prisoners were subjected to a forced death march in an attempt to keep them ahead of the advancing Allied forces.

== American prisoners of war at Berga ==
The German prisoner of war camp Stalag IX-A was located near Ziegenhain, Germany. On 27 January 1945, the camp commandant ordered all Jewish prisoners to step forward out of the daily line-up. The senior noncommissioned officer at the camp, Master Sergeant Roddie Edmonds, ordered his men to disobey the order, and told the Germans: "We are all Jews here." For his actions, Edmonds was made Righteous Among the Nations, the first American soldier to be so honoured. After being kept standing for several hours, 130 men came forward. However, the commandant had been requested to provide 350 men for the transport. Thus, known "troublemakers" among the prisoners, including Private First Class J.C.F. "Hans" Kasten, the elected camp leader, were then selected, including anyone who "looked Jewish."

On February 8, the group was taken by train to Berga. The men were put to work, together with the concentration camp inmates, digging 17 tunnels for an underground ammunition factory, some of them 150 feet below ground. As a result of the appalling conditions, malnutrition and cold, as well as beatings, 47 prisoners died. The U.S. military authorities never acknowledged the incident.

On 4 April, the 300 surviving American prisoners were marched out of the camp ahead of approaching U.S. troops. After a 2½-week forced march, they were finally liberated. During this march, another 36 Americans died.

During an air raid, while the camp lights were extinguished, Hans Kasten, Joe Littel and Ernst Sinner escaped. They were later arrested and taken to Gestapo headquarters. After their identities as POWs were confirmed they were taken to the Buchenwald concentration camp and placed in detention cells. They were freed when KZ Buchenwald was liberated.

The commandant of Berga was Willy Hack. However, a sergeant named Erwin Metz was ultimately responsible for the work details and many of the inhumane conditions. He gave the order to take the prisoners on the death march. When the Allied forces closed in on the retreating Germans, Metz deserted his post and attempted to escape by bicycle. He was captured days after the prisoners were liberated by American forces, and sentenced to death for killing a US POW, Pvt Morton Goldstein (Battery C/590th Field Artillery/106 US Division) on March 14, 1945. His sentence was commuted to 20 years' imprisonment but he only served nine years before being released. Hack was arrested in the Soviet occupation zone of Germany in 1947. He was found guilty in 1948 of his complicity in atrocities leading to the deaths of hundreds of people at the Mittelbau-Dora camp and the Berga camp, and sentenced to 8 years in prison. After a retrial, Hack's sentence was increased to death in 1951, and he was executed in Dresden in 1952.
