= Willy Hack =

German SS officer (1912–1952)

Willy Hack (26 March 1912 – 26 July 1952) was a German SS officer and concentration camp official. He was born in the town of Reutlingen, Baden-Württemberg, and trained as an engineer before joining the Schutzstaffel (SS) in 1934. Following the outbreak of World War II, Hack served in the Waffen-SS on the Eastern Front. In February 1942 he was promoted to the rank of SS-Obersturmführer and transferred to Amtsgruppe C (Buildings and Works) at the SS-Main Economic and Administrative Office in Berlin.

In 1943 Hack was assigned to the staff of the Mittelbau-Dora concentration camp. While at Dora he served as director of construction for the sub-camp of Niedersachswerfen. Hack oversaw hundreds of slave-laborers who were employed in building a large subterranean aircraft engine factory that would be used to produce components for Germany’s V-2 guided missiles. In November 1944 Hack left Dora and was made commandant of the Berga concentration camp near Greiz.

At Berga he again directed slave-labor by concentration camp prisoners, this time using inmates from Buchenwald to dig mining tunnels for use in synthetic oil production. In February 1945 a group of 350 American prisoners of war arrived at Berga. Many of these men were American Jews who had been sent by the SS to Berga, rather than a standard POW camp, due to their ethnicity. The casualties among this group were severe, with at least 55 Americans dying as a result of disease or malnutrition in just the few months they spent in the camp.

Hack was initially able to avoid capture following the German surrender in 1945, but was eventually arrested by Soviet occupation authorities in the city of Zwickau in 1947. Hack was tried by the government of East Germany for war crimes in 1948. He was found to be responsible for the deaths of hundreds of prisoners who had perished under his command at both Niedersachswerfen and Berga. On 22 September 1948, Hack was sentenced to 8 years in prison and loss of his civil rights for 10 years. However, after a retrial, his sentence was increased to death on 23 April 1951. Hack was executed in Dresden on 26 July 1952.
