= St. Mary's Church, Reutlingen =

Church in Reutlingen, Germany

Coordinates: 48°29′28″N 9°12′48″E

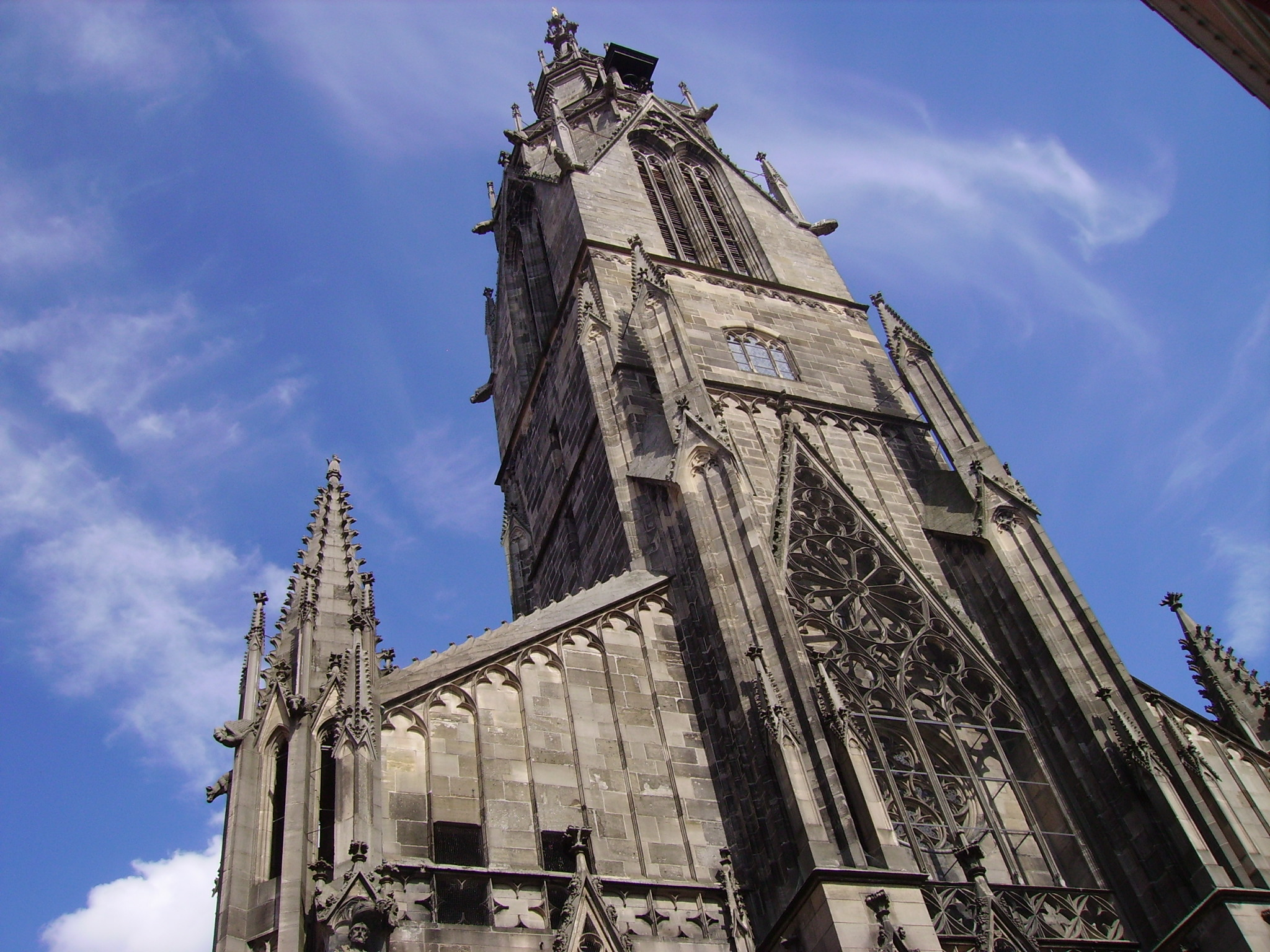
Main tower of St. Mary's Church in the center of Reutlingen

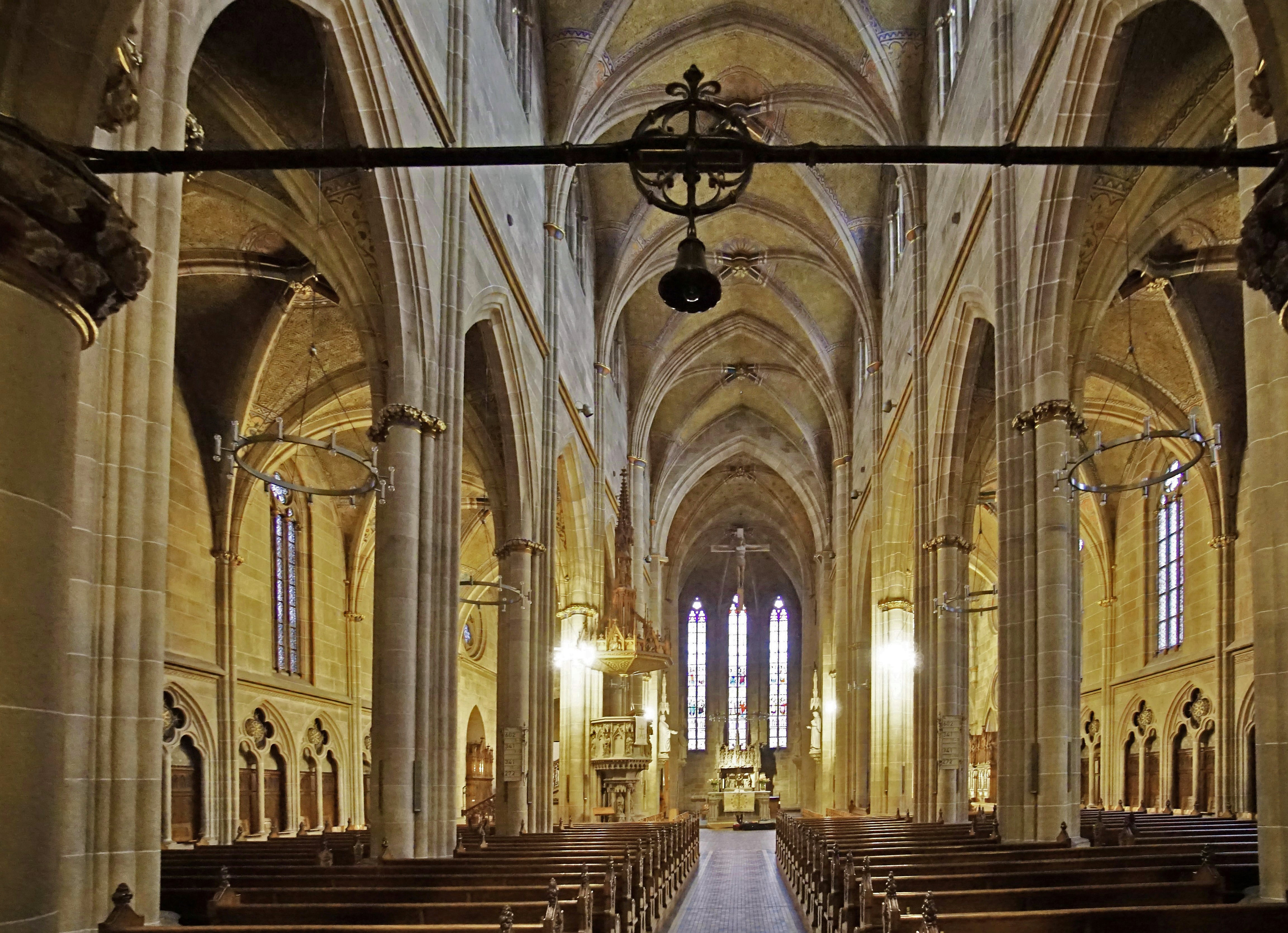
Interior of St. Mary's Church

St. Mary's Church (German: Marienkirche) is a church in Reutlingen, Germany. It was built from 1247 to 1343 and is one of the most distinct Gothic buildings in Swabia.

Between the 1520s and 1540s the church was a center of the Swabian reformer Matthäus Alber, who spread the teachings of Martin Luther to Reutlingen and surrounding areas. The church was heavily damaged during a fire in 1726. From 1893 to 1901 it was rebuilt in Neo-Gothic style. On the 71-meter high west tower shines a gilded angel from 1343.

The church has been a National Cultural Landmark since 1988.
