= Studio for Portrait Masks =

World War I medical unit (1918–1920)

The Studio for Portrait Masks was an organization established in Paris, France at the end of World War I under the auspices of the American Red Cross to fashion galvanized-copper face masks for soldiers who had been facially disfigured during the war. It lasted from the beginning of 1918 to the beginning of 1920, in that period fitting masks for around 200 men.

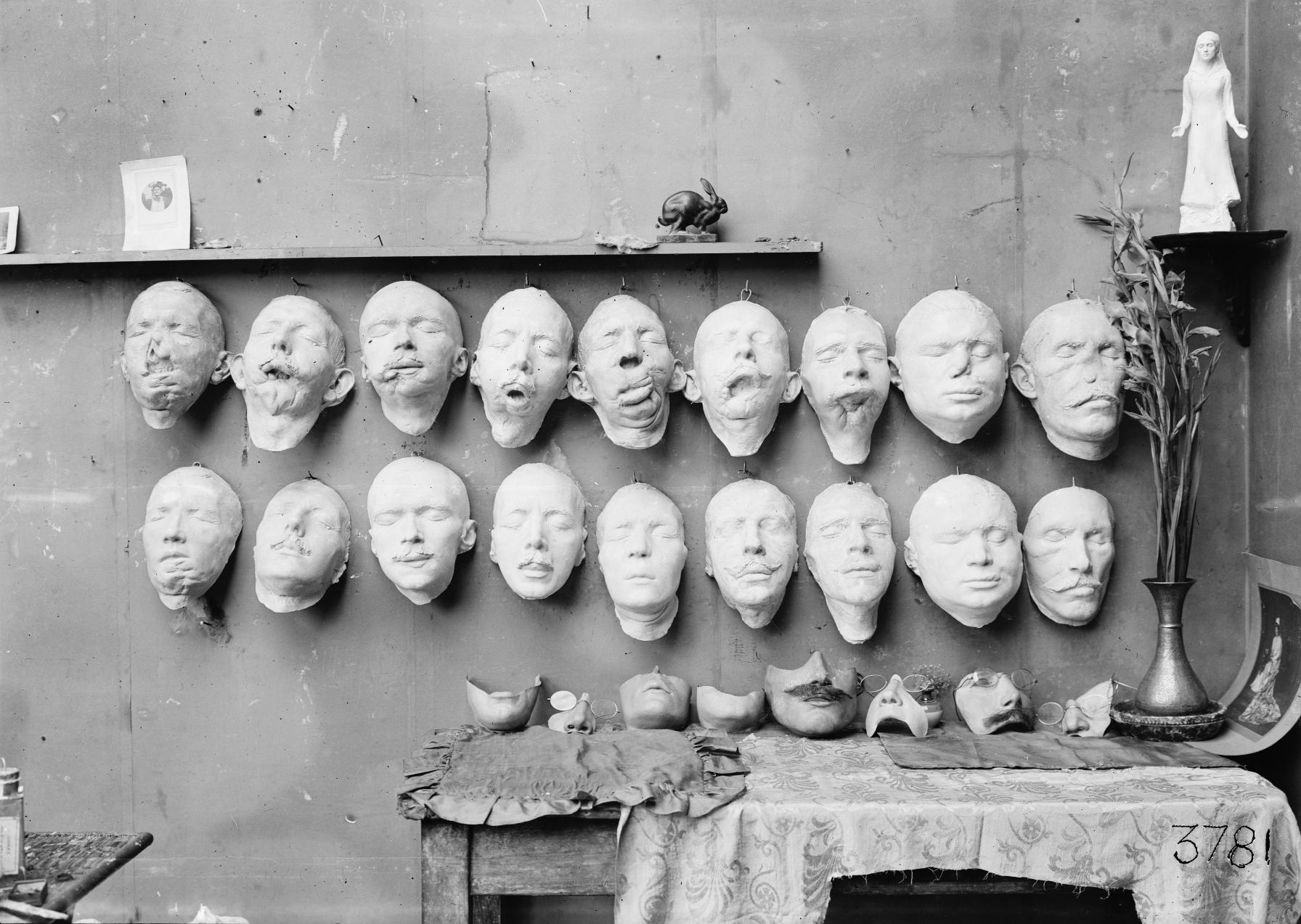
Plaster casts at the Studio

== Background ==
An estimated 15,000 – 20,000 men suffered facial disfiguration during fighting in the First World War. Many became victims of social stigma, even within their own families. Avoiding rooms with mirrors, some lived as recluses, only going out at night. While efforts to support such men were few, the technology for facial surgery was gradually developing, such as through the work in France of Hippolyte Morestin in the field of oral and maxillofacial surgery or of the plastic surgeon, Harold Gillies, a New Zealander living in England. However, their work remained insufficient to allow soldiers to return to their social lives. The creation of prostheses, or artificial parts of a face, was therefore essential, and tentative efforts to do this were being made by dental technicians and, to a lesser extent, sculptors. A pioneer in this field was Francis Derwent Wood, a British artist who volunteered to work in hospitals in London during the war as a member of the Royal Army Medical Corps. In 1915, he founded the Masks for Facial Disfigurement Department at the Third London General Hospital in Wandsworth where, after taking casts of a wounded man's face, he made masks from thin sheets of galvanized copper, which facilitated painting after fitting.

== Establishment of the studio ==
After the American Red Cross (ARC) moved its headquarters to 4 rue de Chevreuse in Paris, it was necessary to rent neighbouring apartments to accommodate nurses and other staff. One of the apartments rented, at 70bis rue Notre-Dame-des-Champs, was a studio belonging to the sculptor, Janet Scudder, a supporter of the ARC. This studio became the setting for the Studio for Portrait Masks, which was developed by the American sculptor Anna Coleman Ladd under the auspices of the "Bureau de Reconstruction et de Rééducation des Mutilés de Guerre" (Bureau for the reconstruction and re-education of war wounded) of the ARC. In January 1918, the studio began to treat French and American soldiers who had been disfigured in combat.

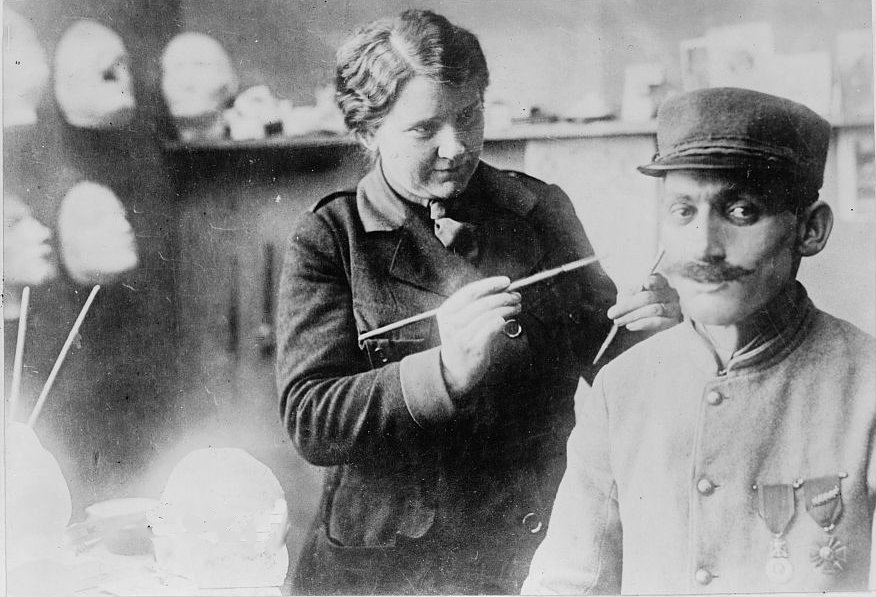
Anna Coleman Ladd and soldier after mask was fitted

Ladd had learned of Wood's practice through British art critic C. Lewis Hind, who gave her an article by Wood explaining his technique. She visited Wood's facilities in London, known familiarly as the "Tin Noses Shop”, in 1917, where he encouraged her to use her own artistic talents to fashion similar masks in Paris. Like many artists at that time, Ladd had become a Red Cross volunteer. She submitted a proposal to the US War Department to establish a prosthetics studio for disfigured French soldiers, which she would finance primarily with her own money. The War Department approved the proposal, but suggested that she include American soldiers among her patients.

== Operation of the studio ==
Ladd spoke four languages and had lived in different parts of Europe for close to 25 years. She had mainly worked in private studios, with sculptors such as Ettore Ferrari and Emilio Gallori in Rome, Antonin Mercié and Auguste Rodin in Paris, Charles Grafly in Philadelphia, and Bela Pratt in Boston, Mass. After establishing the studio, she travelled throughout France to convince surgeons to support her initiative. Her basic technique was the same as Wood's, the masks were hand-painted using washable paints, after oil paints proved unsatisfactory. The process was completed once the mask had been fitted to the patient's face in order to achieve the correct matching colours. The studio earned praise from French surgeons and soldiers, and receiving wide press coverage in the US. However, despite these achievements, Ladd decided to return to Boston in early December 1918, leaving the studio in the hands of the Red Cross and the other artists who had worked with her. When she left, 57 masks had been produced. Although Red Cross officials encouraged her to establish a similar studio in the US, Ladd chose to resume her career as an artist.

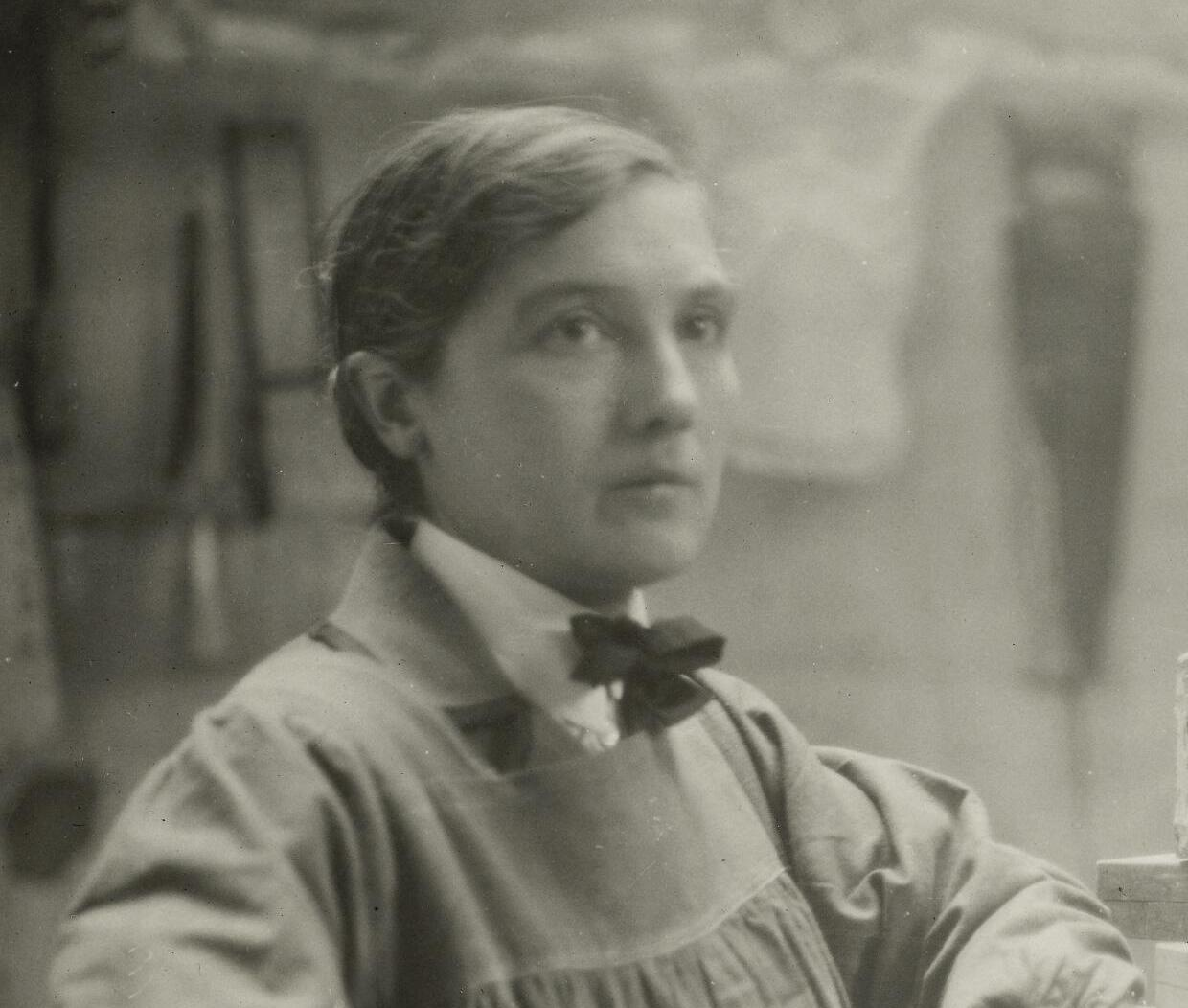
Jane Poupelet

The people who carried on Ladd's work until the studio's closure at the beginning of 1920, when work was transferred to a French military hospital, were the French sculptors, Jane Poupelet, who had joined Ladd a few months after the studio's founding, and Robert Wlérick, who Poupelet had recommended. The American artist Marie-Louise Brent had joined the studio in September 1918 as the secretary but also apparently did some facial restoration work. Diana Blair, curator of specimens at the Harvard Medical Laboratory, also worked there. Poupelet was a Red Cross volunteer and a friend of Janet Scudder, owner of the apartment used for the studio, and she and Wlérick were members of the "bande à Schnegg", a group of sculptors associated with the sculptor and teacher, Lucien Schnegg. Like Ladd, Poupelet was to be made a knight of the French Legion of Honour for her work at the studio.

The facial restoration work was complex and time-consuming. First, the wounds had to be completely healed after surgery. Then, a plaster cast was taken of the patient's face. The role of the artist was to bring the masks to life, painting their metallic surface and matching the patient's skin tone. Finally, eyelashes, moustaches, and eyebrows, made from human hair or copper wire, were developed. There are varying reports of the total number of masks produced but the figure seems to have been around 200, relatively few considering the enormous demand. While recipients were initially enthusiastic as they could then go out in public, the long-term effectiveness of the masks was relatively limited. Although realistic, they were expressionless, and, over time, they became uncomfortable to wear. No records survive documenting the fate of those who received masks, although the "Union des Blessés de la Face" (the Union of the Facially Wounded) provided accommodation for disfigured men and their families. Reports suggest that the masks did not last for more than a few years.
