= Mutschel =

German bread

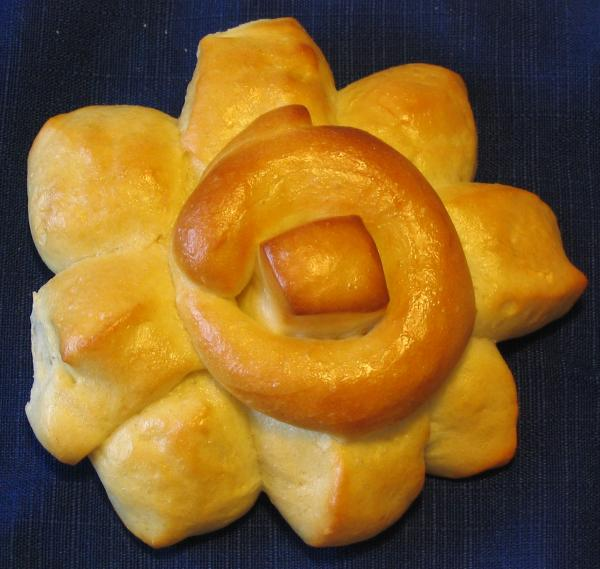
- Type: Bread
- Place of origin: Germany
- Region or state: Reutlingen

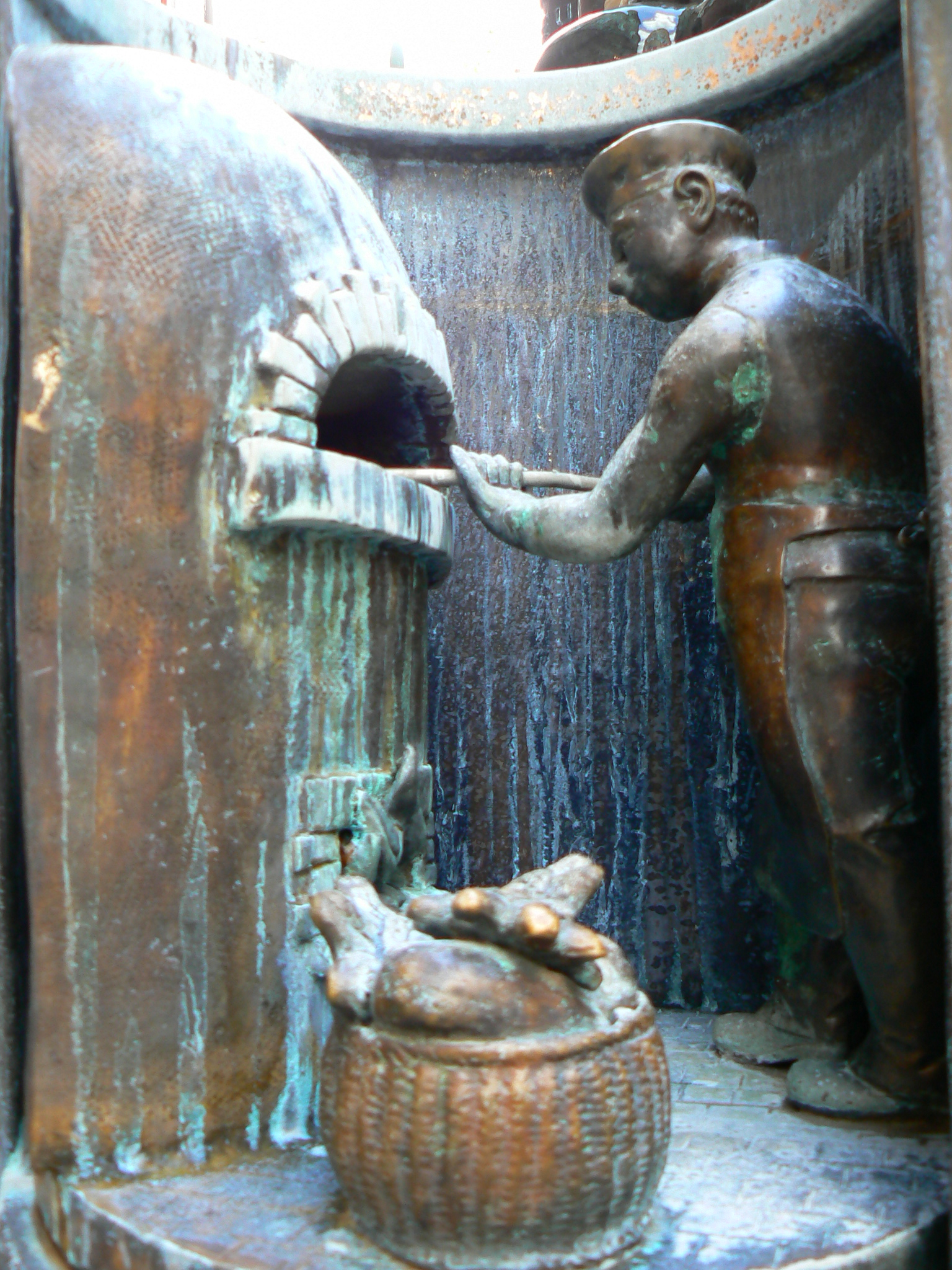
Baker depicted on Guild Fountain in downtown Reutlingen, with Mutscheln at his feet.

The Mutschel is a traditional star-shaped bread from Reutlingen, Germany. The pastry, and the corresponding Mutscheltag (Mutschel Day), have probably existed since the 13th century. Mutscheln are roughly star-shaped and come in various sizes: usually approximately six inches in diameter, but bakeries often offer breads three or more feet in diameter. The most common Mutschel is made of wheat, yeast, a small amount of fat like lard or butter and eggs. They are sometimes made in sweet varieties.

There are several theories about the origin of the bread form. One is that the high central part of the bread represents the castle atop the Achalm, a hill next to Reutlingen, and the eight points of the star represent medieval guilds. The star could also have Christian allegorical meaning as the Star of Bethlehem. A third possibility is that Reutlingen baker Albrecht Mutschler invented the shape in the 14th century. This baker was mentioned first in the 1435 Reutlinger Heimatbuch.

== Mutscheltag ==
On Mutscheltag (the first Thursday after Epiphany), townspeople gather in halls and homes to play dice games, the winner of which earns parts or whole Mutschel breads. You can participate when you are invited into the circle. The Mutschelspiele (Mutschel games) consists of small games scored by tally marks. The games are won both independently and by grand total at the end of the hour or night. Before the game starts it is announced what the winner gets and some details of the rules. The rules can be changed between the rounds. The first rounds are played about the points, then about the center. If it is a very big one, the center is also cut into pieces. At later rounds, the winner might get a whole Mutschel. It is acceptable to eat it at the event, with some butter that is served, it is also ok to take it home and eat it the following days. It is also acceptable for someone who has been lucky to give a part of it to somebody who has been out of luck most of the evening. Mutscheltag is about community, about sharing and making everybody happy and a winner at the end of the day. Usually, there is an abundance of Mutschels so nobody goes home hungry or without some bread for the next day. If a loved one can´t participate, a friend pays a visit to bring over a Mutschel.

In the neighboring community of Pfullingen, there is a similar custom with a cake called "star". The stars of Pfullingen have seven points, the Mutschel usually has eight points, very big ones can also have multiples of eight. Never call a star of Pfullingen a Mutschel, this might be considered offensive as it touches an old and deep rivalry between Pfullingen and Reutlingen. On the other hand, you might inaccurately call a Mutschel a star without being offensive because it truly resembles a star and is connected to the tradition of the Three Kings that followed the star to Bethlehem.

Common dice games are:

=== Twenty-one ===
Played with one die. Player number one lays the die in front of him with one dot face up. He passes it to his neighbor on the right, who rolls and adds the numbers together (one dot from player one and the new roll from player two). She passes the die to the third player, who rolls and gets a new total. Whichever player reaches 21 or higher receives a tally mark. Play as long as desired. Choose whether the most or fewest tally marks wins. Note similarities to 21 (drinking game).

=== House numbers ===
Played with three dice. The point of the game is to get the smallest three-digit "house number." Each player rolls three times. After each roll, write down the die result in the hundreds, tens, or ones place. The three rolls will therefore create a three-digit number. That is, a roll of one should most properly be written down in the hundreds place so that the house number can be as small as possible. A roll of six should be in the ones place. The rule can change to the opposite where the goal is to roll the biggest possible number.

=== Sequence ===
Played with three dice. The player who does not roll a sequence (1 2 3, 2 3 4, 3 4 5, or 4 5 6) receives a tally mark against him. Alternatively, players could play Yahtzee-style where after the first roll of three dice, a player can keep one or two dice and roll the others up to two more times. If after the third roll there is no sequence, she receives a tally mark against her. Play as long as desired.

=== Farm window ===
Played with two dice. Only the numbers 3 and 5 count. If players don't roll a 3 or 5, they receive tally marks against them. Play as long as desired.

=== Naked Luisle ===
Played with three dice. Players must roll every number from 1 to 10 twice. Roll three dice and combine them into totals. For instance, rolling a 1, 2, and 4 allows a player to score 1, 2, 3, 4, 5, 6, and 7 by adding the dice in various ways. Rolling 3, 5, and 6 results in the totals 3, 5, 6, 8 and 9. Going around the table one roll at a time, each player must roll all ten numbers first. Once all are reached, players have to roll 1 through 10 again to "cross off" what was rolled before. The first player to roll all ten numbers, then cross all ten numbers off, is the winner.

=== Long duck crap ===
Played with three dice. Only rolls in which players roll a 1, 2, and 3 count; all other rolls result in a tally mark against the player. The group can choose to let players roll two or three times (Yahtzee-style) to try for this sequence.

=== Other games include ===
- The guard blows from the tower (in which players blow a die off an overturned cup and compare it with a hidden die underneath the cup)
- Seven eat like animals
- "Mäxle" (though it is not strictly speaking a Mutschel game).

== See also ==
- List of breads
