= Léon-Ernest Drivier =

French sculptor

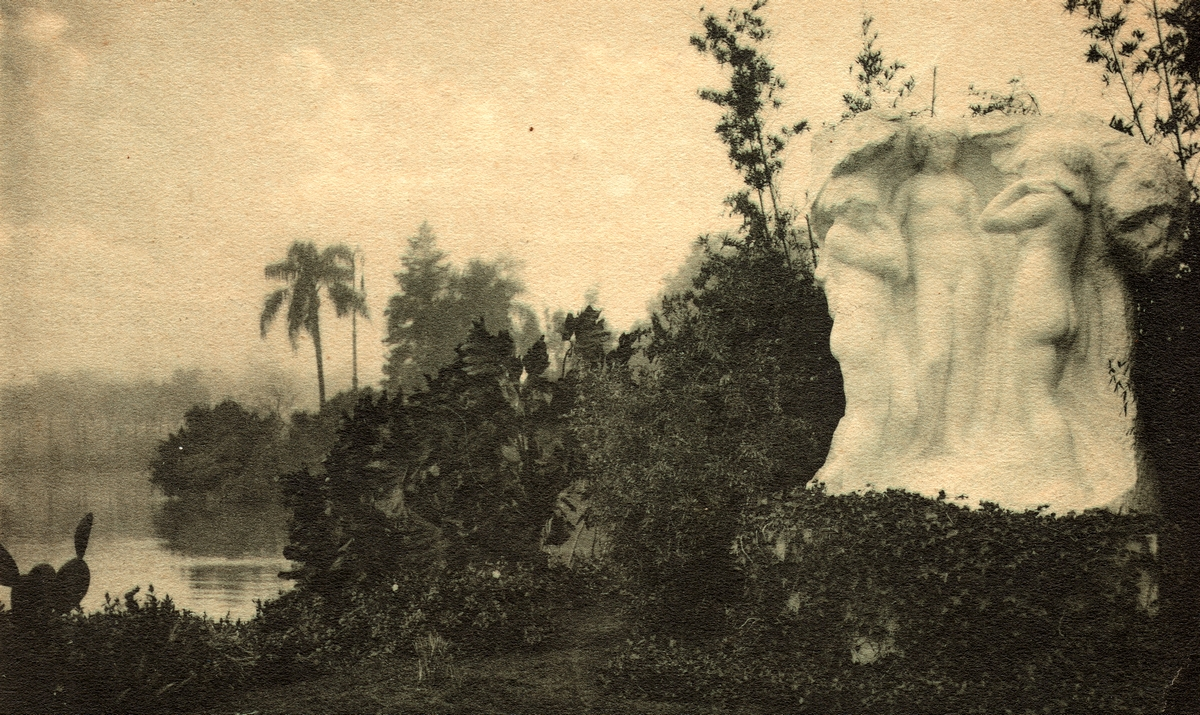
La Primavera ('Spring') in Buenos Aires

Léon-Ernest Drivier (22 October 1878, Grenoble – 8 January 1951, Paris), was a French illustrator and sculptor.

== Biography ==
He entered the École des Beaux-Arts, then worked from 1907 in the studio of Auguste Rodin. He was a friend of the sculptors Auguste de Niederhausern, Gaston Schnegg, Jane Poupelet and Antoine Bourdelle, among others. In 1918, he made a bust of France official winner. His first time was akin to neo-romanticism, and then came close to neo-classicism of Charles Despiau. He was elected a member of the Académie des Beaux-Arts in 1943.

== Main works ==
- La France apportant la paix et la prospérité aux colonies: a ten-meter gilded bronze statue, representing the warrior Athena with a spear, overlooking a pond at several levels, Porte Dorée in Paris. This statue was placed there for its proximity to the Museum of Colonial opened in 1931 for the International Colonial Exhibition.
- Les Muses and La Joie de vivre, made to the Jardins du Trocadéro for the 1937 Exposition Universelle.
- The Monument aux morts de Strasbourg on Place de la République, inaugurated in 1936 by French President Albert Lebrun. This is one of the few monuments dedicated to the dead pacifists of France.
