= Anaplastology =

Branch of medicine dealing with facial prosthetics

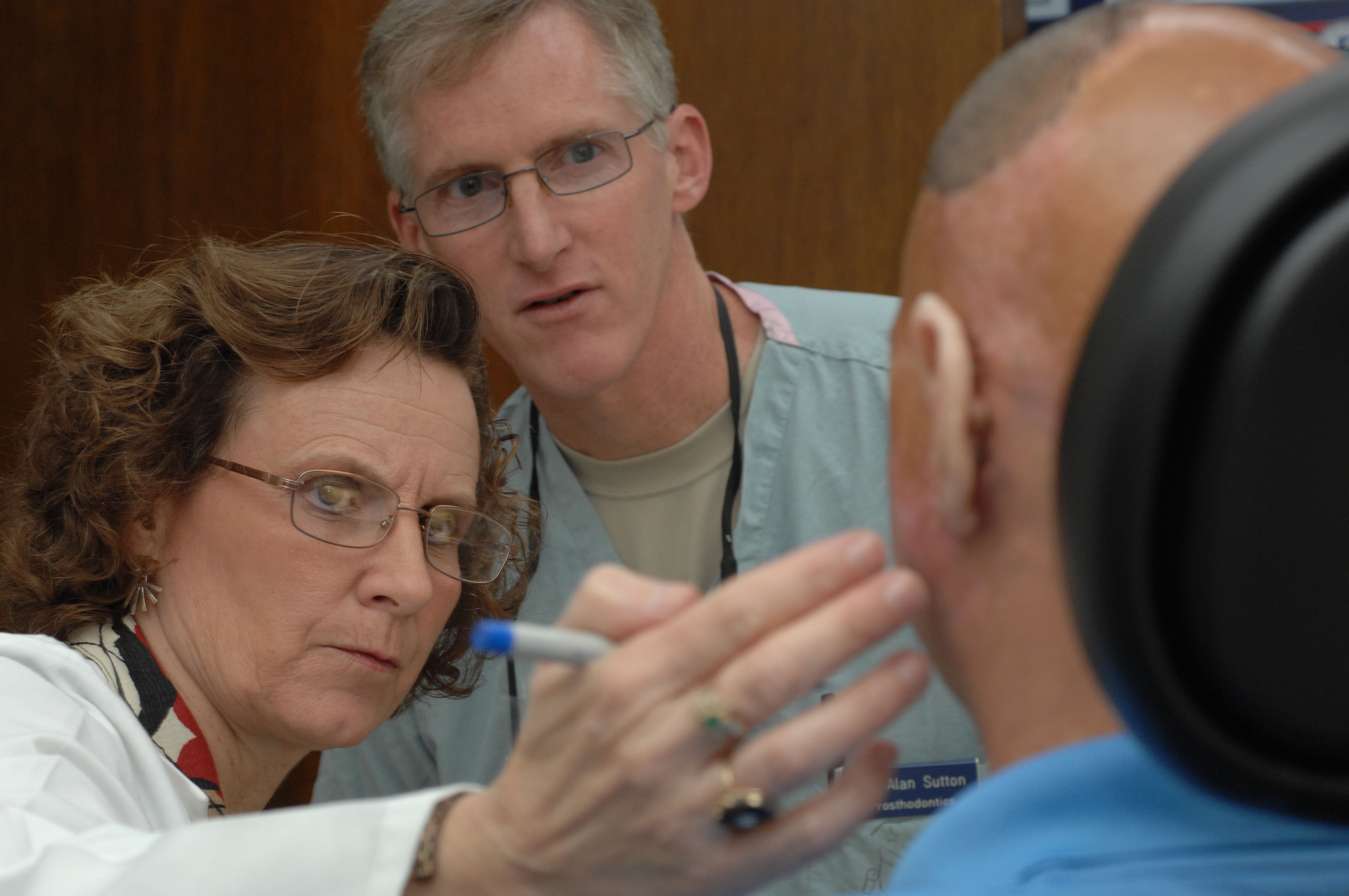
An anaplastologist fits an Iraq War veteran with prosthetic ears

Anaplastology (Gk. ana-again, a new, upon plastos-something made, formed, molded logy-the study of) is a branch of medicine dealing with the prosthetic rehabilitation of an absent, disfigured or malformed anatomically critical location of the face or body. The term anaplastology was coined by Walter G. Spohn and is used worldwide.

An anaplastologist (also known as a maxillofacial prosthetist and technologist in the United Kingdom) is an individual who has the knowledge and skill set to provide the service of customizing a facial (craniofacial prosthesis), ocular or somatic prosthesis. In locations around the world that facial, ocular and somatic prostheses are not readily available, a dentist who specializes in maxillofacial prosthetics (prosthodontics), or a dental technician or an ocularist, may also be titled an anaplastologist. In urban or more developed locations, an individual referred to as an anaplastologist is one who solely works with facial, ocular or somatic prostheses. In such a setting, the anaplastologist sometimes collaborates with prosthodontists and ocularists.

The studies of an anaplastologist consist of the arts and sciences. Visual arts are studied, namely photography, illustration, sculpture, and painting. Biology, behavioral sciences, materials science, and physics are the studied sciences with emphases in superficial anatomy and physiology of humans, polymer science, optics, dermatology, oral and maxillofacial surgery, otolaryngology, and oncology to name a few.

Certification in the field of anaplastology is provided by the Board for Certification in Clinical Anaplastology (BCCA). Professionals certified by the BCCA are designated as Certified Clinical Anaplastologists and denote their credential with the CCA title.

== History ==
In the Battle of the Somme, an estimated 4,000,000 shots were fired, causing 20,000 facial injuries. Individuals whose injuries were unable to be treated with plastic surgery or reconstructive surgery techniques available to them at the time were given the option of wearing customized pieces to restore the natural appearance of their face. These pieces were crafted by sculptors. A notable sculptor who created prosthetic pieces for victims of war was Anna Coleman Ladd, a member of the Red Cross who made casts of her patients' faces and then, by hand, would create pieces out of galvanized copper, tin foil, and human hair for them to wear. Ladd's pieces were secured with bands around the head, which were often concealed by false eyeglasses.

World War I caused exponential growth and organization for the fields of Anaplastology, plastic surgery, and surgical anesthesia. Due to the invention of trench warfare, artillery, machine guns, and gas attacks, facial injuries were seen on a scale never experienced before. But, the field of plastic surgery was just beginning to emerge. Most techniques focused on saving the patient, not ensuring quality of life if they lived. Many soldiers felt that the contributions of Ladd and other early anaplastologists were the best choice, allowing them to reintegrate back into society with less "stopping and staring" from other civilians.

In 1980 Walter G. Spohn and a group of like-minded colleagues founded the American Anaplastology Association (AAA) at Stanford University, in Palo Alto, California.

=== In the media ===
In the 1986 musical, Andrew Lloyd Weber's The Phantom of the Opera, the character Erik wears a facial mask to hide his facial deformities.

In the 2004 film, The Libertine, John Wilmot, 2nd Earl of Rochester, as portrayed by American actor Johnny Depp is shown to wear a facial mask to cover the sores on his face caused by syphilis.

In the 2010 television show Boardwalk Empire, the character Richard Harrow wears a tin mask with glasses to hide the disfigurement of his face he endured during his service as a soldier in World War I.

In the 2017 Wonder Woman movie, the character Dr. Maru, also known as Dr. Poison, is a chemist working with the Germans in WWI. In the film, Dr. Maru wears a primitive mask colored and shaped like her face, to cover the bottom left side of her face.

== Famous Anaplastologists ==
- Walter G Spohn (June 5, 1914 - January 24, 2003), was the founder of the American Anaplastology Association, and coined the phrase anaplastology. In 2008, the American Anaplastology Association became the International Anaplastology Association.
- David Reisberg, current president of the International Anaplastology Association.
- Anna Coleman Ladd (July 15, 1878 – June 3, 1939), Prosthetics sculptor and recipient of the Legion of Honor
- P.K. Sethi (28 November 1927 – 6 January 2008), created the Jaipur foot
- William Robert Grossmith, made the 1st prosthetic arm
