= Walter G. Spohn =

American plastic surgeon

Walter G. Spohn (June 5, 1914 - January 24, 2003) was the founder of the American Anaplastology Association, and coined the phrase anaplastology. The term came from combining the words anatomy and plastics to form anaplastology. In 2008, the American Anaplastology Association became the International Anaplastology Association.
