= Craniofacial prosthesis =

Surgical re-creation of part of the face

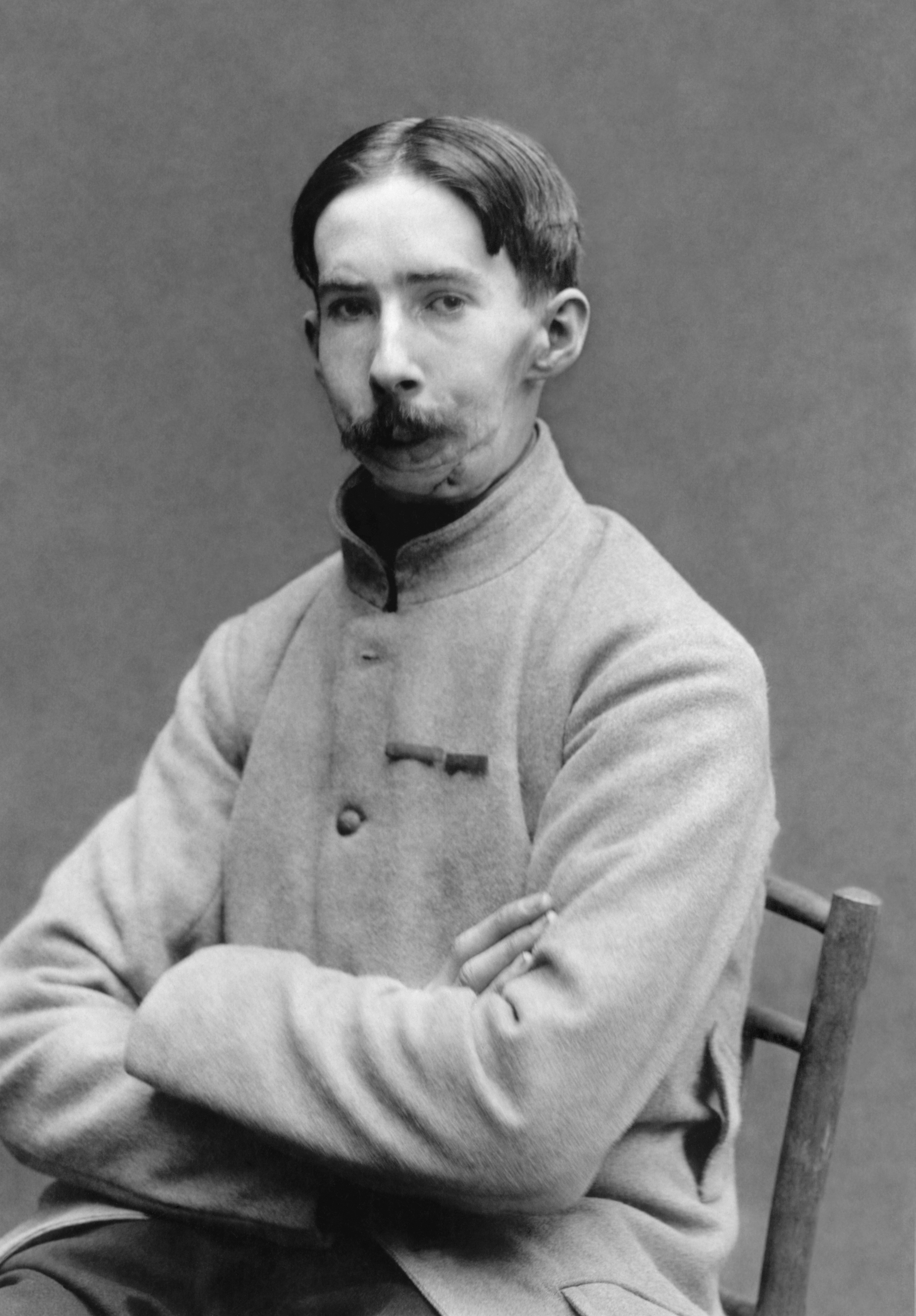
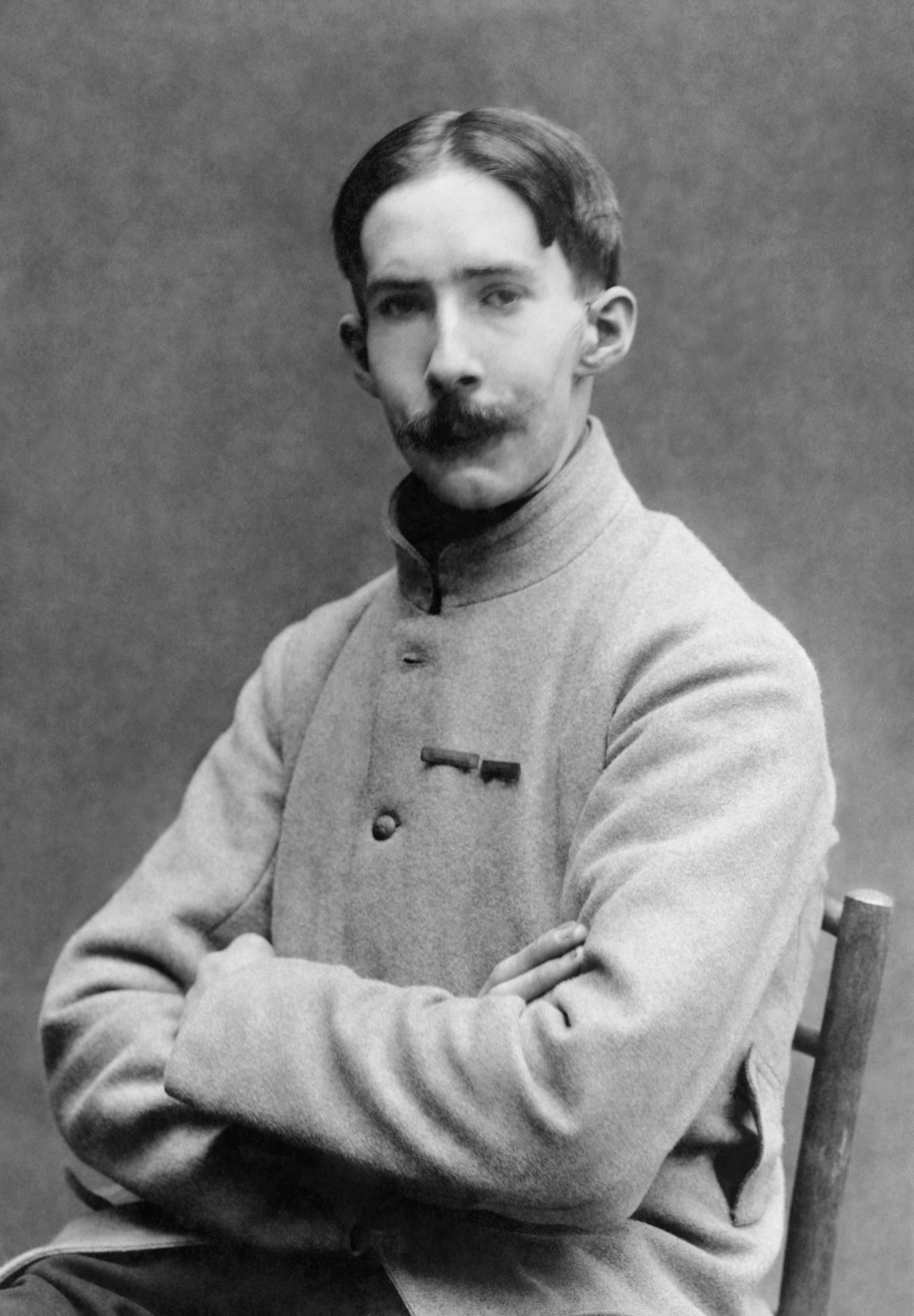
Before (left) and after image of a French man wearing a craniofacial prosthesis, 1918
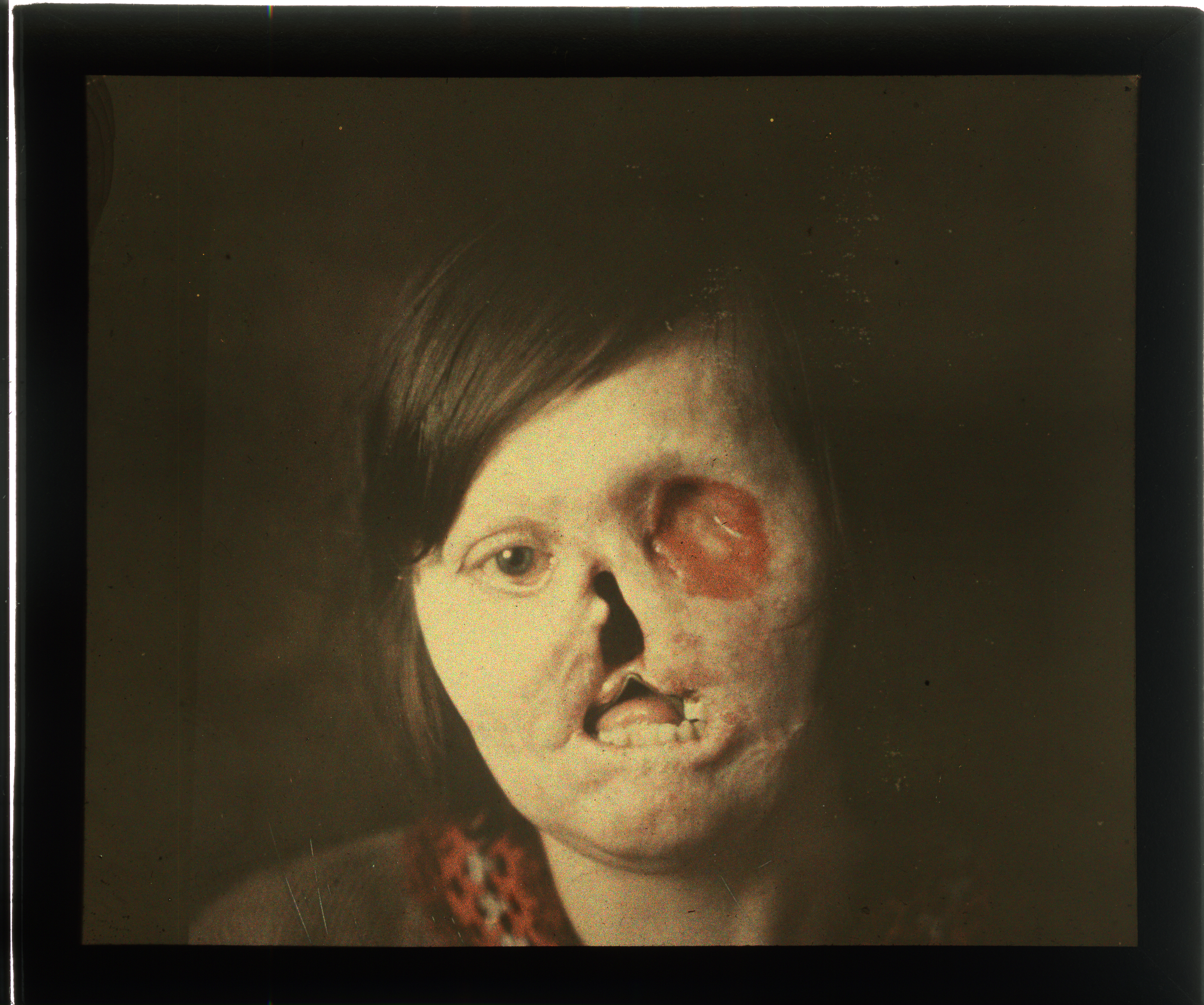
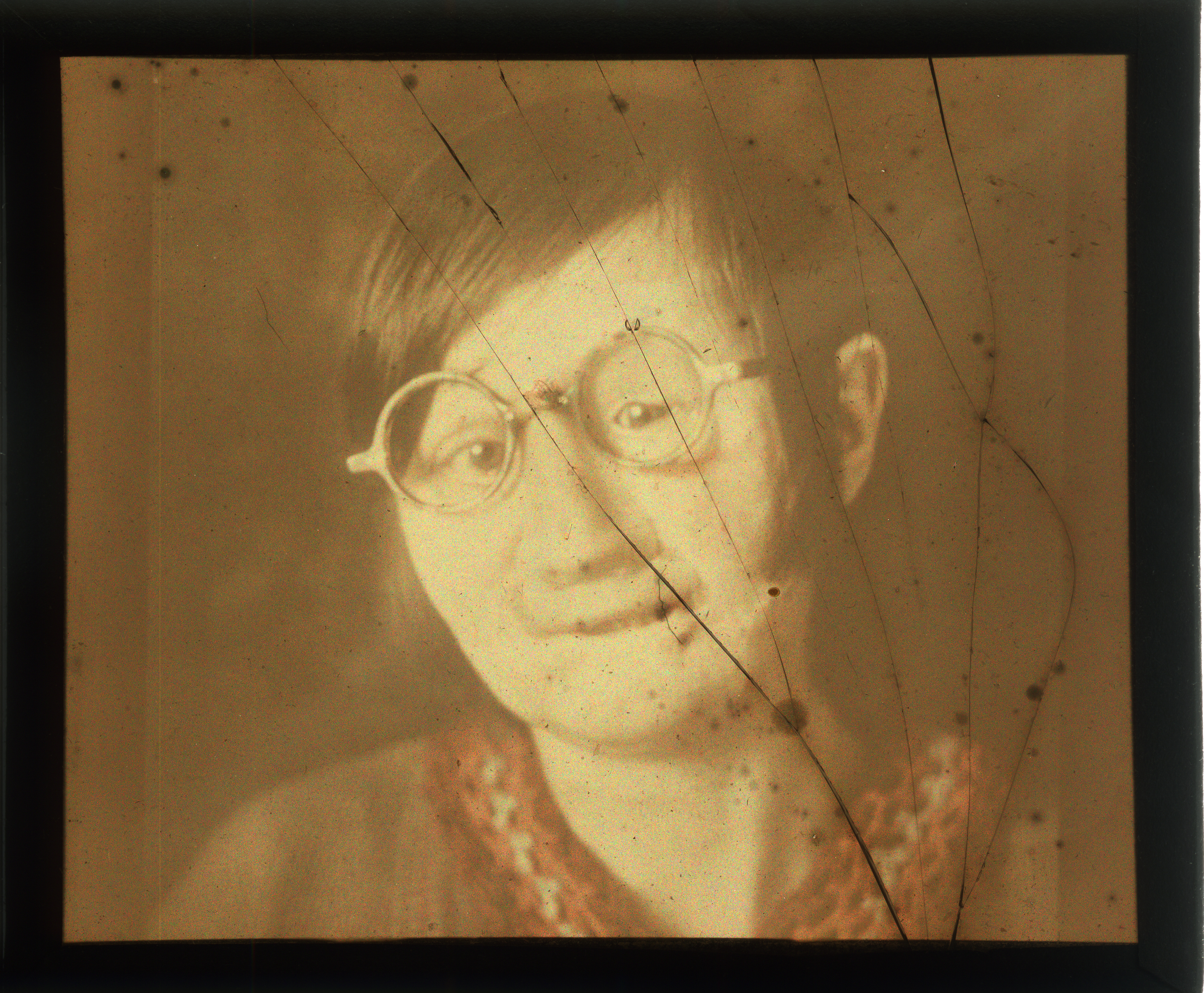
Before (left) and after image of a French woman wearing a craniofacial prosthesis, 1900-1950

Craniofacial prostheses are prostheses made by individuals trained in anaplastology or maxillofacial prosthodontics who medically help rehabilitate those with facial defects caused by disease (mostly progressed forms of skin cancer, and head and neck cancer), trauma (outer ear trauma, eye trauma) or birth defects (microtia, anophthalmia). They have the ability to replace almost any part of the face, but most commonly the ear, nose or eye/eyelids. An ocular prosthesis and hair prosthesis can also be classified as craniofacial prostheses. Prostheses are held in place either by biocompatible drying adhesives, osseointegrated implants, magnets, or another mechanical means (although rare) such as glasses or straps. Prostheses are designed to be as similar as possible to the natural anatomy of each individual. Their purpose is to cover, protect, and disguise facial disfigurements or underdevelopments.

When surgical reconstruction is not ideal, craniofacial prosthetics are favored when they can better restore the form and function of the absent facial feature. Craniofacial prosthetics are not wholly considered cosmetic because they replace the physical form and functional mechanics of the absent anatomy and serve a significant role in the emotional stability and rehabilitation of those with facial defects.

== See also ==
- Anaplastology
- Prosthetic
- Prosthodontics
