= Saint-Paul-Lizonne =

- Commune
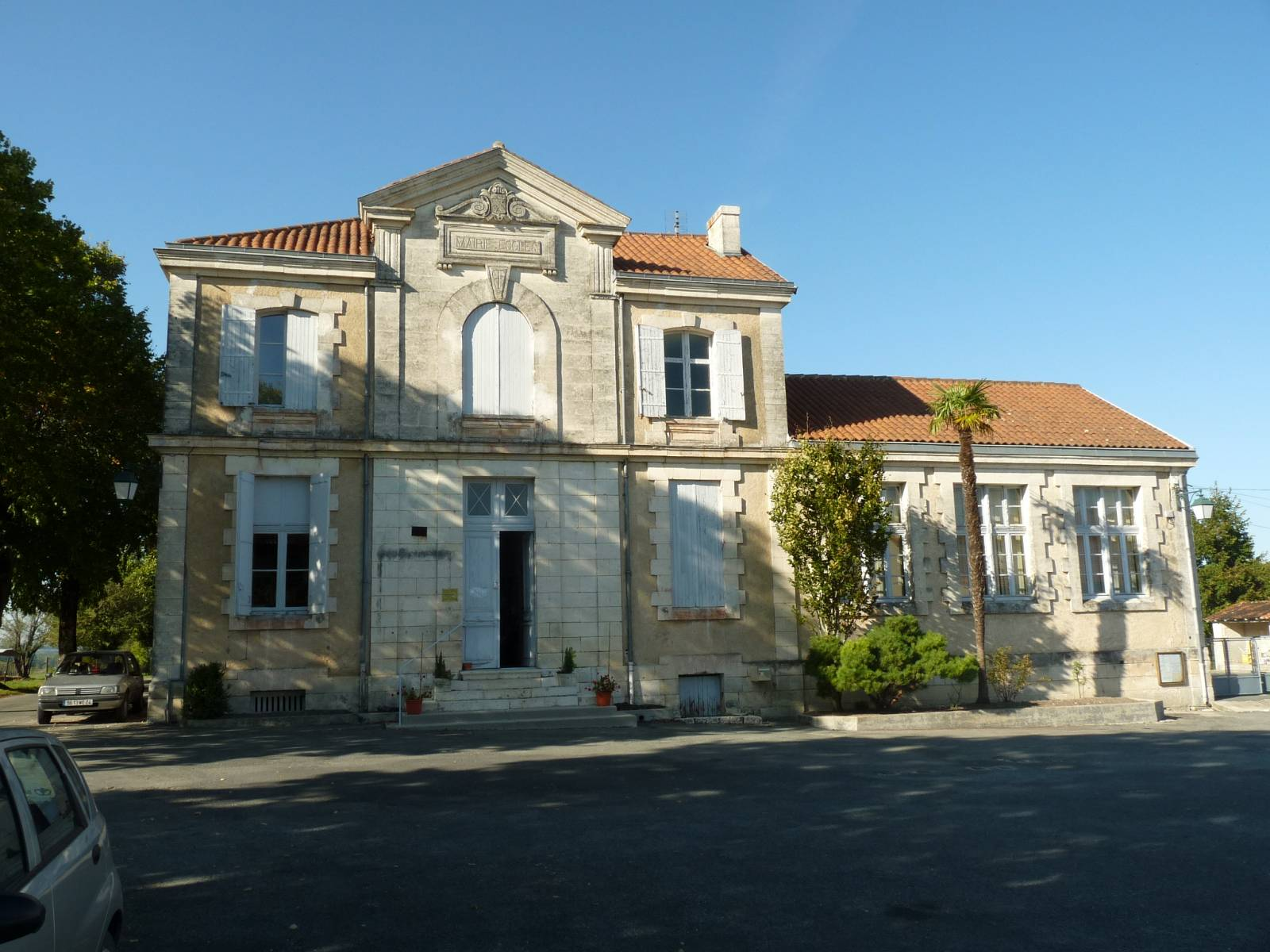
- Town hall
- Location of Saint-Paul-Lizonne
- Location within France Location within Nouvelle-Aquitaine
- Coordinates: 45°19′14″N 0°16′56″E
- Country: France
- Region: Nouvelle-Aquitaine
- Department: Dordogne
- Arrondissement: Périgueux
- Canton: Ribérac

Government
  - Mayor (2020–2026): Brigitte Pourtier
- Area^{1}: 9.28 km^{2} (3.58 sq mi)
- Elevation: 100 m (330 ft)
- Highest elevation: 152 m (499 ft)
- Lowest elevation: 50 m (160 ft)
- Population (2023): 274
  - Density: 29.5/km^{2} (76.5/sq mi)
- Time zone: UTC+01:00 (CET)
  - Summer (DST): UTC+02:00 (CEST)
- INSEE/Postal code: 24482 /24320
- ^{1} French Land Register data, which excludes lakes, ponds, glaciers > 1 km^{2} (0.386 sq mi or 247 acres) and river estuaries.

Saint-Paul-Lizonne (French pronunciation: [sɛ̃ pɔl lizɔn]; Limousin: Sent Pau de Lisona) is a commune in the Dordogne department in Nouvelle-Aquitaine in southwestern France.

== Geography ==
The Lizonne forms the commune's western border.

== Population ==
Historical population
Year	Pop.	±% p.a.
1968	411	—
1975	337	−2.80%
1982	361	+0.99%
1990	347	−0.49%
1999	332	−0.49%
2007	318	−0.54%
2012	283	−2.31%
2017	273	−0.72%
2023	274	+0.06%
Source: INSEE

== See also ==
- Communes of the Dordogne department
