= Yvonne Serruys =

French sculptor

- Born: 26 March 1873; Menen, Belgium
- Died: 1 May 1953 (aged 80); Paris, France
- Known for: Sculpture
- Spouse: Pierre Mille (m. 1909)
- Awards: Legion of Honour

Yvonne Serruys (26 March 1873 – 1 May 1953) was a Franco-Belgian artist. In 1920, she received the Légion d’honneur.

== Biography ==
Born in Menen, West Flanders into a wealthy francophone family, Serruys studied painting and drawing with Emile Claus. From 1892 to 1894, she studied in Brussels in the workshop of painter Georges Lemmen, a member of Les XX. She then returned to study again with Claus.

After undertaking a tour of Italy and Greece, Serruys exhibited her paintings in Paris at the Salon in 1898. It was at this point that she decided to become a sculptor, a decision which led her back to Brussels where she began new studies with sculptor Égide Rombaux. In 1904, she returned to Paris where she established her own workshop. Her work included 250 sculptures and over 300 pieces in glass. She received a number of public commissions, including a monument to her teacher Emile Claus in Ghent, one for Paul Cambon in Tunis, and a war memorial in her home town. The majority of her work was romantic in style, largely portraiture and nudes, but including some religious pieces.

An active member of salon culture, she met her future husband Pierre Mille, writer, journalist, and diplomat, at one such gathering. They married in Menen in 1909, and for many years organised their own salons. Yvonne Serruys received public recognition for her work, receiving the Légion d'honneur in 1920, and being created an officer of the Order of Léopold in 1934.

Serruys died in Paris in 1953. Her will left many of her works to the town of Menen where they are now held by the local museum, the Stadsmuseum nl:'t Schippershof.
