= Rodo =

French sculptor

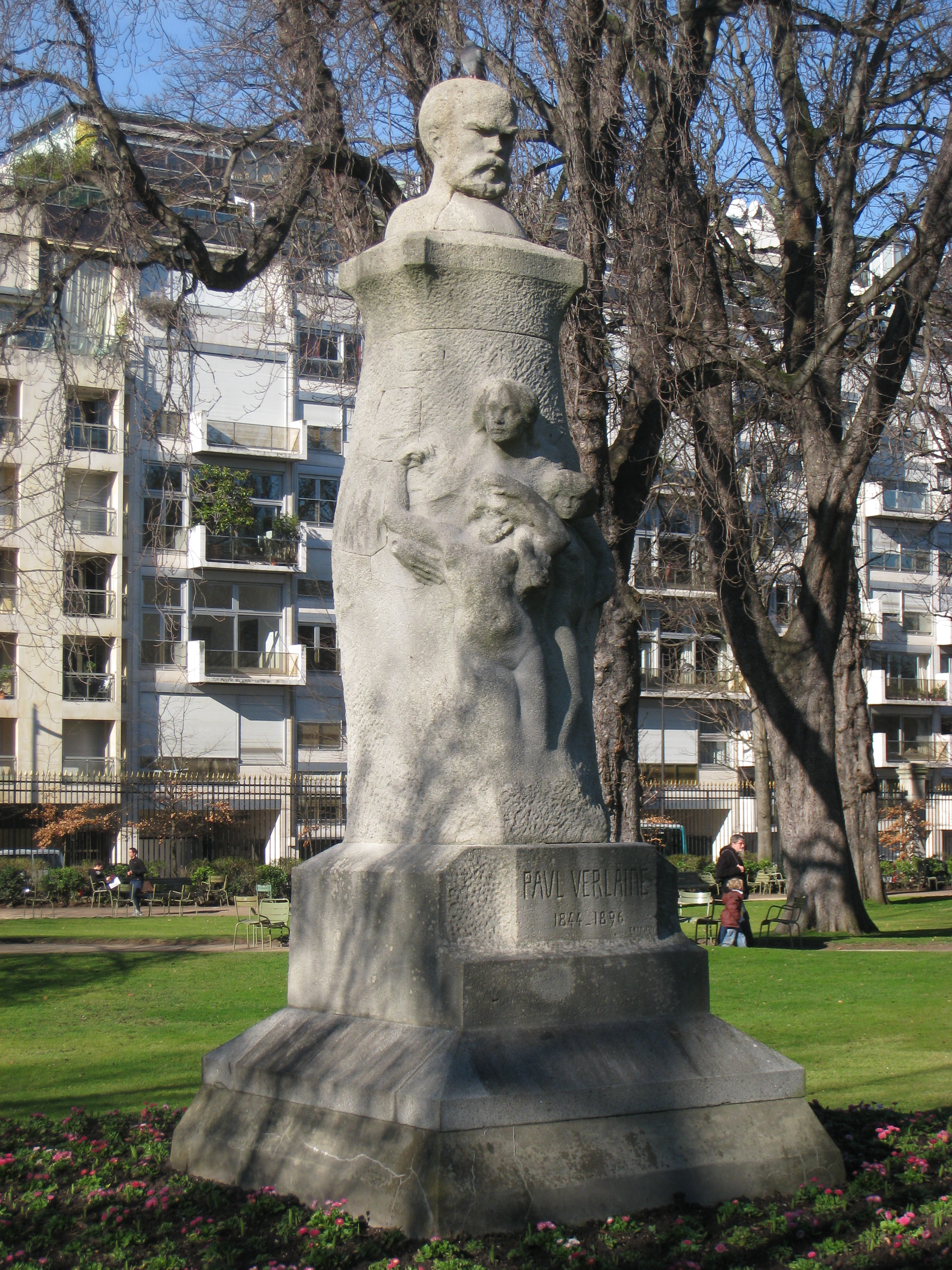
Bust of Paul Verlaine, by Auguste de Niederhäusern, or Rodo.

Auguste de Niederhäusern, better known as Rodo (2 April 1863 – 21 May 1913) was a Swiss sculptor and medalist active in Switzerland and France.

Rodo was born in Vevey, and in 1866 moved with his family to Geneva. He attended the École des Arts industriels de Genève (1881) and the École des Beaux-Arts de Genève (1882) under the direction of Barthélemy Menn, then studied at the Académie Julian with Henri Chapu (1886) and at the École des Beaux-Arts de Paris under Alexandre Falguière. For six years he worked in Auguste Rodin's studio.

In 1895 he received a commission for the Paul Verlaine monument in the Jardin du Luxembourg, which was finally inaugurated in 1911. He died in 1913 during a visit to Munich.
