= List of people with given name Esther or Ester =

The given name "Esther" or its common variant, "Ester", may refer to the following notable people:

== Mononymous ==
This section is for people who are predominantly known by their first name.

- Esther, the eponymous heroine of the Book of Esther
- Ester (footballer)
- Baby Esther, American singer and child entertainer
- Comandanta Esther, nom de guerre of a revolutionary in the Zapatista Army of National Liberation (EZLN) of Chiapas, Mexico

== Esther ==
- Esther Abrahams (1771–1846), Australian female convict
- Esther Aghatise (born 1980), Nigerian long jumper
- Esther Saville Allen (1837–1913), American writer
- Esther Anderson
- Esther E. Baldwin (1840–1910), American missionary, teacher, and writer
- Esther Baxter (born 1984), American model
- Esther Bejarano (1924–2021), German concentration camp survivor
- Esther Bell, American film director
- Esther Benbassa (born 1950), French historian and politician
- Esther de Berdt (1746–1780), American colonist and civic leader
- Esther Blake (1897–1979), U. S. Air Force Staff Sergeant
- Esther Barbara Bloemart (1651–1733), German art collector
- Esther Boise van Deman (1862–1937), American archaeologist
- Esther Brand (1922–2015), South African former athlete
- Esther Brandeau, Canadian settler
- Esther Brann (1899–1998), American writer and illustrator
- Esther Brimmer, American civil servant
- Esther Bubley (1921–1998), American photographer
- Esther Cailingold (1925–1948), Haganah member
- Esther Cañadas (born 1977), Spanish actor and model
- Esther Cardoso, Cuban actress
- Esther Clark Wright (1895–1990), Canadian historian
- Esther Clayson (1869–1967), American physician and public health pioneer
- Esther Cleveland (1893–1980), second child of American president Grover Cleveland
- Esther Cohen, Mexican writer
- Esther Dankwah (born 1982), Ghanaian sprinter
- Esther David (born 1945), Indian Jewish author, artist, and sculptor
- Esther Dean (born 1982), American singer and songwriter
- Esther Delisle, French-Canadian historian
- Esther Duflo (born 1972), French-American economist
- Esther Dyson (born 1951), Swiss-American journalist
- Esther Earl (1994–2010), American author, internet vlogger, online personality, and activist
- Esther Edler (1884–1908), Norwegian actress
- Esther Edwards (disambiguation)
- Esther Egger-Wyss (born 1952), Swiss politician
- Esther Eneutseak (1877–1961), Inuk performer and actor
- Esther Erlich, Australian artist
- Esther Farbstein, Israeli historian, researcher, author, and lecturer
- Esther Fernández (1915–1999), Mexican actress
- Esther Ferrer (born 1937), Spanish artist
- Esther Fischer-Homberger (1940–2019), Swiss medical historian and psychotherapist
- Esther Flesch (born 1967), Brazilian lawyer
- Esther Forbes (1891–1967), American novelist, historian, and children's writer
- Esther G. Frame (1840–1920), American minister and evangelist
- Esther Freud, British actress and novelist
- Esther Friesner (born 1951), American writer
- Esther Geller (1921–2015), American painter and watercolorist
- Esti Ginzburg (born 1990), Israeli model
- Esther Golar (1944–2015), American politician
- Esther Goris (born 1960), Argentine actress
- Esther Haase (born 1966), German photographer
- Esther Hahn (born 1985), American surfer
- Esther Hall (born 1970), English television and theatre actress
- Esther Hamerman (1886–1977), Polish-born American painter
- Esther Handali (died 1588), Jewish Ottoman businesswoman
- Esther Hart (singer) (born 1970), Dutch singer
- Esther Hasson (1867–1942), first Superintendent of the United States Navy Nurse Corps
- Esther Hautzig (1930–2009), American writer
- Esther Hayden (1713–1758), American poet
- Esther Haywood (1940–2024), American politician
- Esther Hermitte (1921–1990), Argentine anthropologist
- Esther Hicks, American author
- Esther Hnamte (born 2016), Indian child singer and prodigy
- Esther Hobart Morris (1814–1902), American judge
- Esther Aberdeen Holm (1904–1984), American geologist and paleontologist
- Esther Studholme Hope (1885–1975), New Zealand artist
- Esther Housh (1840–1898), American social reformer, author, and newspaper editor
- Esther Howard (1892–1965), American actress
- Esther Howland (1828–1904), American artist and businesswoman
- Esther Hunt (1751–1802), American pioneer
- Esther Inglis (1571–1624), Scottish painter, translator and calligrapher
- Esther James (1900–1990), New Zealand model and land developer
- Esther John (1929–1960), Pakistani nurse
- Esther Johnson (1681–1728), friend of Jonathan Swift
- Esther Jolobala, Malawian politician
- Esther Jones (disambiguation)
- Esther Jungreis (1936–2016), American author and public speaker
- Esther Kamatari (born 1951), Burundian princess
- Esther Kellner (1908–1998), American writer
- Esther Kenworthy Waterhouse (1857–1944), British artist
- Esther Kiaʻāina (born 1963), Guam-born Hawaii politician
- Esther Augusta Howard King (1845–1925), American clubwoman
- Esther Kimani, Kenyan engineer
- Esther Kinsky (born 1956), German literary translator and author
- Esther Kiplagat (born 1966), Kenyan long-distance runner
- Esther von Kirchbach (1894–1946), German journalist and chaplain
- Esther Mayambala Kisaakye, Justice of the Supreme Court of Uganda
- Esther Koimett (born 1957), Kenyan investment banker
- Esther Kolawole (born 2002), Nigerian wrestler
- Esther Kostøl (1936–2023), Norwegian trade union leader
- Esther Kreitman (1891–1954), Yiddish-language novelist
- Esther Nisenthal Krinitz (1927–2001), Polish Jewish artist
- Esther Ku (born 1980), American comedian and actress
- Esther Kwan (born 1964), Hong Kong actress
- Esther Kyozira, Ugandan disability rights activist
- Esther Lahoz (born 1963), Spanish sprinter
- Esther Lamandier (born 1946), French soprano and harpist
- Esther Lamm (1913–1989), Swedish psychiatrist and psychoanalyst
- Esther de Lange (born 1975), Dutch politician
- Esther de Lange (cricketer) (born 1984), Dutch international cricketer
- Esther Lanser (born 1984), New Zealand cricketer
- Esther Lanz (born 1899), American politician
- Esther Lape (1881–1981), American journalist and suffrage activist
- Esther Largman (born 1934), Brazilian author
- Esther Gil de Reboleño Lastortres (born 1973), Spanish sociologist and politician
- Esther Lawrence (1862–1944), American educationist and school principal
- Esther Christian Lawton (1910–1998) (1910–1998), civil servant and women's rights activist
- Esther Leach (1809–1843), Colonial-Indian English stage actress
- Esther Lederberg (1922–2006), American microbiologist
- Esther Kim Lee (born 1970), American theatre historian
- Esther Morris Leidolf, American intersex activist
- Esther Lekain (1870–1960), Belgian singer
- Esther Alejandro de León (born 1947), Puerto Rican composer
- Esther Leslie (born 1964), British political aesthetician
- Esther Levine (born 1970), German photographer
- Esther Levitt (1904–1987), Israeli activist
- Esther Lewis (abolitionist) (1782–1848), Pennsylvania abolitionist and farmer
- Esther Lewis (missionary) (1887–1958), Welsh missionary
- Esther Lewis (poet) (1716–1794), English poet
- Esther Liebmann (1649-1714), German financier
- Esther Lin, Brazil–born poet of Chinese descent
- Esther Lipman (1900–1991), Australian politician
- Esther J. Trimble Lippincott (1838–1888), American educator, reformer, author
- Esther Littlefield (1906–1997), Native American artist from Alaska
- Esther Liu (born 1988), Taiwanese actress, singer, and television host
- Esther Llamazares (born 1970), Spanish politician
- Esther Lofgren (born 1985), American rower
- Esther Pohl Lovejoy (1869–1967), American physician
- Esther Doughty Luckhardt (1913–2011), American Republican politician
- Esther Lungu (born 1957), First Lady of Zambia
- Esther Lurie (1913–1998), Israeli painter
- Esther Lutgens, Dutch physician, molecular biologist, and professor
- Esther Okello Lutwa (died 2002), Ugandan first lady and politician
- Esther Lyman (1927–1991), American baseball player
- Esther Lynch (born 1963), Irish trade unionist
- Esther MacCallum-Stewart, British author and academic
- Esther Blaikie MacKinnon (1884–1934), Scottish artist
- Esther Madudu (born 1980), Ugandan midwife
- Esther Mahlangu (born 1935), South African artist
- Esther Majaza, Malawi politician
- Esther Mangzha (born 1952), Nigerian educational planner
- Esther Manheimer (born 1971), American politician and attorney
- Esther Manito, British comedian
- Esther Martín-Pozuelo (born 1998), Spanish footballer
- Esther Martinez (1912–2006), Tewa activist and linguist
- Esther Angélica Martínez (born 1970), Mexican politician
- Esther Murugi Mathenge, Kenyan politician
- Esther Matiko (born 1976), Tanzanian politician
- Esther Mbabazi (born 1988), Rwandan airline pilot
- Esther Mbagari (born 2000), Kenyan sprinter
- Esther Eba'a Mballa (born 1984), Cameroonian volleyball player
- Esther Mbulakubuza Mbayo (born 1971), Ugandan politician
- Esther Mbofana (born 1992), Zimbabwean cricketer
- Esther McCoy (1904–1989), American novelist and architectural historian
- Esther McCracken (1902–1971), British actress and playwright
- Esther McCready (1931–2020), American nurse and teacher
- Esther Morgan McCullough (1888–1957), American novelist
- Esther McGregor (born 2001), British actress and model
- Esther Lord McNeill (1812–1907), American temperance leader
- Esther McVey (born 1967), British politician
- Esther Meek (born 1953), American philosopher
- Esther Meir-Glitzenstein (born 1954), Israeli academic, researcher of Jews in the Arab world
- Esther Meisels (born 1995), Israeli cyclist
- Esther Mengold (1877–1954), Swiss artist
- Esther van Messel (born 1965), Dutch-Swiss film producer
- Esther Meynell (1878–1955), English writer
- Esther de Mézerville (1885–1971), Guatemalan teacher, feminist, suffragette, and activist
- Esther San Miguel (born 1975), Spanish Olympic judoka
- Esther Miller (born 1957), Canadian cross-country skier
- Esther Burnell Mills (1889–1964), American pioneer and homesteader
- Esther Minciotti (1888–1962), Italian actress
- Esther Mombo (born 1957), Kenyan theologian
- Esther Montelius (1871–1948), Swedish author
- Esther T. Mookini (1928–2023), American linguist
- Esther Moore (1857–1934), British artist
- Esther Morales (1949–2020), Bolivian grocer, businessperson, and public figure
- Esther Moreno (born 1969), Mexican wrestler
- Esther Morgan (poet) (born 1970), British poet
- Esther Morgan (footballer) (born 2002), Wales international footballer
- Esther Hobart Morris (1814–1902), American judge
- Esther Morrison (1931–2018), American baseball player
- Esther Moya (born 1984), Spanish artistic gymnast
- Esther Moyal (1874–1948), Lebanese Jewish journalist
- Esther Muchemi, Kenyan businesswoman
- Esther Muinjangue (born 1962), Namibian politician
- Esther Muir (1903–1995), American actress
- Esther Mujawayo (born 1958), Rwandan sociologist and psychotherapist
- Esther Mukwasa (born 1996), Zambian footballer
- Esther Majambere Musoke, Ugandan lawyer
- Esther Mvondo (born 1975), Cameroonian sprinter
- Esther Mwaikambo (born 1940), Tanzanian medical doctor
- Esther Mwikali (died 2019), Kenyan land rights activist
- Esther Mwombe (born 1987), Kenyan volleyball player
- Esther Nabaasa, Ugandan songwriter
- Esther Nakajjigo (c. 1995–2020), Ugandan activist
- Esther Nakaziba (born 1995), Ugandan makeup artist
- Esther Ze Naw, Kachin humanitarian and ethnic minority rights activist
- Esther Ndeti, Kenyan engineer
- Esther Nelson (1810–1843), Manx poet
- Esther Neuenschwander (born 1983), Swiss curler
- Esther Newberg, American literary agent and political aide
- Esther Newport (1901–1986), American painter
- Esther Newton (born 1940), American cultural anthropologist
- Esther Ngumbi, Kenyan-American entomologist
- Esther Nirina (1932–2004), Malagasy poet and librarian
- Esther Takei Nishio (1925–2019), Japanese-American internee
- Esther Niubó (born 1980), Spanish politician
- Esther Nkansah (1948–2019), Ghanaian politician
- Esther Nworgu, Nigerian powerlifter
- Esther Nyaiyaki, Kenyan lawyer
- Esther Oluremi Obasanjo (1976–1979), First Lady of Nigeria
- Esther Afua Ocloo (1919–2002), Ghanaian entrepreneur
- Esther Odekunle, British neurobiologist and antibody engineer
- Esther Ofarim (born 1941), Israeli singer
- Esther Dzifa Ofori, Ghanaian diplomat
- Esther Okhae (born 1986), Nigerian footballer
- Esther Okoronkwo (born 1997), Nigerian footballer
- Esther Olavarria (born 1962), American government official
- Esther Omam, Cameroonian human rights activist
- Esther Ongley, New Zealand lawyer
- Esther Onyenezide (born 2003), Nigerian footballer
- Esther Oribamise (born 2001), Nigerian para table tennis player
- Esther Orozco (born 1945), Mexican biologist, researcher, and politician
- Esther Ouna (born 1968), Kenyan volleyball player
- Esther Ouwehand (born 1976), Dutch politician and marketing manager
- Esther Overton (born 1990), Australian Paralympic swimmer
- Esther Oyema (born 1982), Nigerian powerlifter
- Esther Panitch (born 1971), American politician
- Esther Parada (1938–2005), American photographer
- Esther Park (physician) (c. 1876–1910), Korean physician
- Esther Passaris (born 1964), Kenyan politician
- Esther Pasztory (1943–2024), American art historian
- Esther Paterson (1892–1971), Australian artist
- Esther Pavihi, Niuean journalist and politician
- Esther Peled, Israeli author
- Esther Peña (born 1980), Spanish politician
- Esther Koplowitz, 7th Marchioness of Casa Peñalver (born 1953), Spanish businesswoman and philanthropist
- Esther Perel (born 1958), Belgian psychotherapist and author
- Esther Peris (born 2000), Spanish paraplegic
- Esther Peter-Davis (1932–2022), French environmentalist
- Esther Peterson (1906–1997), American consumer rights activist
- Esther Phillips (1935–1984), American singer
- Esther Phillips (poet) (born 1950), Barbadian poet
- Esther Phiri (born 1987), Zambian boxer
- Esther J. Piercy (1905–1967), American librarian and cataloger
- Esther Pilkington, British performance artist
- Esther Pilster (1916–2014), American educator and principal
- Esther Pissarro (1871–1951), British artist
- Esther Polak (born 1962), Dutch artist
- Esther de Pommery, Swiss activist
- Esther D. du Pont (1908-1984), American horse breeder & philanthropist
- Esther Popel (1896–1958), American poet
- Esther Porter (1900–1935), Ukrainian-Argentine anarchist
- Esther Povitsky (born 1988), American comedian
- Esther Prior (born 1973), Malawian-English Anglican bishop
- Esther Pritchard (1840–1900), American minister and editor
- Esther Pugh (1834–1908), American temperance reformer
- Esther Qin (born 1991), Australian diver
- Esther Raab (1894–1981), Israeli poet
- Esther Rahim (1904–1963), Pakistani painter
- Esther Ralston (1902–1994), American actress
- Esther Rantzen (born 1940), English television presenter
- Esther Ratugi (born 1988), Kenyan Judoka
- Esther Razanadrasoa (1892–1931), Malagasy novelist
- Esther Raziel-Naor (1911–2002), Israeli politician
- Esther de Berdt Reed (1746–1780), First Lady of Pennsylvania
- Esther Reed (born 1978), American criminal
- Esther Ann Reeser (1928–2014), American baseball player
- Esther Regina, Spanish actress
- Esther Réthy (1912–2004), Hungarian soprano
- Esther Biddle Rhoads (1896–1979), American educator
- Esther Loring Richards (1885–1956), American psychiatrist
- Esther K. Richardson (1901–1963), Representative in Hawaii Territorial House
- Esther Richardson (born 1974), British theatre director and script editor
- Esther Rickards (1893–1977), British surgeon and socialist activist
- Esther de Boer-van Rijk (1853–1937), Dutch stage actress
- Esther Rivera (born 1964), Mexican Paralympic athlete
- Esther Robertson (born 1952), Italian archer
- Esther Rochon (born 1948), Canadian science fiction writer
- Esther Rodriguez-Villegas, Spanish engineer, inventor
- Esther Rodríguez (born 1982), Spanish volleyball player
- Esther Rofe (1904–2000), Australian musician and composer
- Esther Rolick (1922–2008), American painter
- Esther Rolle (1920–1998), American actress
- Esther Rome (1945–1995), American women's health activist and writer
- Esther Ronay (1940–2025), Hungarian-British documentary filmmaker
- Esther Roord (1965–2026), Dutch actress
- Esther Roper (1868–1938), English suffragist
- Esther Rose (painter) (1901–1990), American painter
- Esther Rose (musician), American country musician
- Esther Roth-Shahamorov (born 1952), Israeli track and field athlete
- Esther Rothstein (1913–1998), American lawyer
- Esther Rots (born 1972), Dutch film director
- Esther Kerr Rusthoi (1909–1962), American hymnwriter
- Esther Sagawa (born 1994), Malawian local politician
- Esther Salaman (1900–1995), Russian-British physicist, literary critic, and writer
- Esther Salas (born 1968), American judge
- Esther Quintana Salinas (born 1951), Mexican politician
- Esther Salmovitz (born 1948), Israeli lawyer and former politician
- Esther Sandoval (1925–2006), Puerto Rican actress
- Esther R. Sanger (1926–1995), American philanthropist
- Esther Sanz (born 1974), Spanish badminton player
- Esther Saperstein (1901–1988), American politician
- Esther Satterfield (born 1946), American jazz singer
- Esther Saunders (1793–1862), American poet
- Esther Schapira (born 1961), German journalist and filmmaker
- Esther Schipper (born 1963), German art dealer and gallerist
- Esther Schop (born 1990), Dutch handball player
- Esther Schor (born 1957), American scholar
- Esther Schweins (born 1970), German actress and comedian
- Esther Scliar (1926–1978), Brazilian pianist and composer
- Esther Mae Scott (1893–1979), Mississippi blues singer
- Esther Scott (1953–2020), American actress
- Esther Seager (1835–1911), New Zealand prison and asylum matron
- Esther Segal (1895–1974), Canadian Yiddish-language poet
- Esther Seiden (1908–2014), Mathematical statistician
- Esther Seligson (1941–2010), Mexican author
- Esther Sanz Selva (born 1985), Spanish politician
- Esther Shalev-Gerz (born 1948), Lithuanian-born French artist
- Esther Shaw (1925–2017), American politician
- Esther Shemitz (1900–1986), American painter, wife of Whittaker Chambers
- Esther Shephard (1891–1975), American folklorist
- Esther Lucas Shields (1868–1940), American nurse
- Esther Shimazu (born 1957), American sculptor
- Esther Shiner (1924–1987), Canadian politician
- Esther Shkalim (born 1954), Israeli poet, Mizrahi feminist, cultural researcher
- Esther Short (1806–1862), American settler, founder of Vancouver
- Esther Shumiatcher-Hirschbein (1899–1985), Belarusian-born Canadian and American Jewish poet
- Esther Siamfuko (born 2004), Zambian footballer
- Esther Silveus (1903–1980), American physician
- Esther Simpson (1903–1996), English humanitarian
- Esther Sittler (born 1952), French politician
- Esther Sleepe (1725–1762), English fan-maker
- Esther Smith (born 1986), English actress
- Esther Smith (musician) (born 1937), American gospel musician
- Esther Smith (singer), Ghanaian gospel musician
- Esther Snyder (1920–2006), American businesswoman
- Esther Somerfeld-Ziskind (1901–2002), American neurologist and psychiatrist
- Esther Soyannwo, Nigerian teacher and politician
- Esther Stace (1871/1872–1918), Australian equestrian
- Esther Stam (born 1987), Georgian judoka
- Esther Staubli (born 1979), Swiss football referee
- Esther Baker Steele (1835–1911), American educator, author, philanthropist
- Esther Sternberg (born 1951), Canadian professor of medicine and researcher
- Esther Stoeckli (born 1961), Swiss neuroscientist and researcher
- Esther Murphy Strachey (1897–1962), American historian
- Esther Streit-Wurzel (1932–2013), Israeli children's book author and educator
- Esther Stroy (born 1953), American sprinter
- Esther Sullastres (born 1993), Spanish footballer
- Esther Sunday (born 1992), Nigerian footballer
- Esther Dawt Chin Sung (born 1998), Burmese singer
- Esther Süss (born 1974), Swiss mountain biker
- Esther Sutherland (1932–1986), American jazz musician
- Esther Szekeres (1910–2005), Hungarian–Australian mathematician
- Esther Tailfeathers (born 1960/1961), Canadian physician and Indigenous health advocate
- Esther Takeuchi (born 1953), American chemical engineer and materials scientist
- Esther Tan (born 1975), Singaporean adventure racing athlete
- Esther Tay (born 1955), Singaporean fashion designer
- Esther W. Taylor (1826–1904), American physician
- Esther Tefana (1948–2021), French Polynesian singer
- Esther Termens (born 1984), Spanish field hockey player
- Esther Thelen (1941–2004), American developmental psychologist
- Esther Thyssen (born 1979), German ice hockey player
- Esther Cox Todd (1895–1971), American composer and music educator
- Esther Toko (born 2000), Nigerian rower
- Esther Tomljanovich (1931–2026), American judge
- Esther Torres (1897–1975), Mexican trade unionist
- Esther Trépanier (1951–2024), Quebec art historian, curator, educator, museum director
- Esther Van Wagoner Tufty (1896–1986), American journalist
- Esther Turpin (born 1996), French heptathlete
- Esther Tusquets (1936–2012), Spanish publisher, novelist and essayist
- Esther Tyldesley, British translator and academic
- Esther Antin Untermeyer (died 1983), American judge
- Esther Uzodinma (born 2002), Nigerian actress
- Esther Vagning (1905–1986), Danish pianist
- Esther Valiquette (1962–1994), Canadian artist and documentary film director
- Esther Vanhomrigh (c. 1688–1723), Irish poet, lover of Jonathan Swift
- Esther Vaquero (born 1982), Spanish television presenter
- Esther Kim Varet, American art dealer and gallerist
- Esther van Veen (born 1990), Dutch cyclist
- Esther Elizabeth Velkiers (1640 – after 1685), Swiss singer, musician, and composer
- Esther Veltman (born 1966), Dutch cricketer
- Esther Vergeer (born 1981), Dutch wheelchair tennis player
- Esther Veronin (born 1987), Taiwanese-American director, singer, actress
- Esther Vilar (born 1935), Argentine-German writer
- Esther Vilenska (1918–1975), Lithuanian Jewish Israeli communist politician
- Esther Voet (born 1963), Dutch journalist and editor
- Esther Walker (1894–1943), American actress
- Esther Wallenstein (1846–1903), American orphanage owner
- Esther K. Walling (1940–2017), American politician
- Esther J. Walls (1926–2008), American librarian
- Esther Wamala, Ugandan science and health journalist
- Esther Wangeci (born 1990), Kenyan volleyball player
- Esther Wanjiru (born 1977), Kenyan long-distance runner
- Esther Warkov (activist), American activist and researcher
- Esther Warkov (artist) (born 1941), Canadian artist
- Esther Kenworthy Waterhouse (1857–1944), British artist
- Esther Pearl Watson (born 1973), American cartoonist and author
- Esther Weber (born 1967), German wheelchair fencer
- Esther Wertheimer (1926-2016), Canadian sculptor
- Esther Wheelwright (1696–1780), Ursuline nun
- Esther Griffin White (1869–1954), American journalist and politician
- Esther Whitley (1755–1833), American pioneer
- Esther Wilkins (1916–2016), American dental hygienist and author
- Esther Williams (1921–2013), American swimmer and actress
- Esther Wojcicki (born 1941), American journalist and educator
- Esther Wong (1917–2005), American music promoter
- Esther E. Wood (1905–2002), American journalist
- Esther Wood (1866–1952/3), British art critic
- Esther Woolfson, British writer
- Esther Clark Wright (1895–1990), Canadian historian
- Esther Wunnicke (1922–2013), American lawyer
- Esther V. Yanai (1928–2003), American conservationist
- Esther Yang (born 1987), Taiwanese actress
- Esther Yeivin (1877–1975), Israeli politician
- Esther Saavedra Yoacham (1928–2017), Chilean beauty pageant titleholder
- Esther Yoo (born 1994), American violinist
- Esther Young (1717–1795), English operatic contralto
- Esther Yu (born 1995), Chinese actress
- Esther Zweig (1906–1981), American composer

== Ester ==
- Ester Adaberto (1872–1951), Italian opera singer
- Ester Almqvist (1869–1934), Swedish painter
- Ester Andujar (born 1976), Spanish jazz singer
- Ester Balassini (born 1977), Italian hammer thrower
- Ester Banda, Zambian politician
- Ester Barinaga (born 1972), Danish academic
- Ester F. Bentley (1915–2004), American social worker
- Ester Martin Bergsmark (born 1982), Swedish director and screenwriter
- Ester Bonet (born 1950), Spanish philologist and linguist
- Ester Boserup (1910–1999), Danish economist
- Ester Brymová (born 1978), Czech filmmaker
- Ester Capella (born 1963), Spanish lawyer and politician
- Ester Carloni (c. 1904–1996), Italian actress
- Ester Claesson (1884–1931), Swedish landscaping pioneer
- Ester Cosani (1914–2001), Chilean writer and illustrator
- Ester Dean (born 1986), American singer-songwriter
- Ester Edström (1892–1945), Swedish diver
- Ester Ellqvist (1880–1918), Swedish painter
- Ester (footballer) (born 1982), Brazilian footballer
- Ester Expósito (born 2000), Spanish actress
- Ester Fanous (1895–1990), Egyptian feminist
- Ester Ferrabini (1885–1984), Italian opera singer
- Ester Fuchs (born 1951), American academic
- Ester Fenoll Garcia (born 1967), Andorran writer and poet
- Ester Geislerová (born 1984), Czech actress and model
- Ester Goldfeld (born 1993), American tennis player
- Ester Goossens (born 1972), Dutch athlete
- Ester Graff (1897–1991), Danish businesswoman and feminist
- Ester Haikola-Sakaria, Namibian politician and member of parliament
- Ester Helenius (1875-1955), Finnish painter
- Ester Henning (1887–1985), Swedish artist
- Ester Hernandez (born 1944), American artist
- Ester Hofvander-Sandberg (1888–1967), Swedish lawyer
- Ester Paredes Jimenez (1916–1997), Filipina activist
- Ester Julin (1885–1931), Swedish actress, director and screenwriter
- Ester Rachel Kamińska (1870–1925), Polish actress
- Ester Karuse (born 1992), Estonian politician
- Ester Kreitsman (born 2007), Estonian rhythmic gymnast
- Ester Krumbachová (1923–1996), Czech stage designer, author and screenwriter
- Ester Larsen (1936–2025), Danish politician
- Ester Ledecká (born 1995), Czech snowboarder and skier
- Ester de Lemos (born 1929), Portuguese writer and former politician
- Ester Lindstedt-Staaf (born 1943), Swedish politician
- Ester Mägi (1922–2021), Estonian composer
- Ester Mazzoleni (1883–1982), Italian soprano
- Ester Xargay Melero (1960–2024), Spanish poet, writer, and videoartist
- Ester Mieli (born 1976), Italian politician
- Ester Molné (born 1977), Andorran lawyer, judge and politician
- Ester Mombelli (1794 – after 1827), Italian opera singer
- Ester Muñoz (born 1985), Spanish politician
- Ester Navarrete (born 1990), Spanish runner
- Ester Blenda Nordström (1891–1948), Swedish journalist, author, and explorer
- Ester Noronha (born 1992), Indian actress and singer
- Ester Oras (born 1984), Estonian archaeologist and chemist
- Ester Pajusoo (1934–2026), Estonian actress
- Ester Palmesino (1927–2016), Italian high jumper
- Ester Partegàs (born 1972), Spanish contemporary artist
- Ester Peony (born 1993), Romanian singer and songwriter
- Ester Naomi Perquin (born 1980), Dutch poet
- Ester Petitón (born 1966), Cuban sprinter
- Ester Plicková (1928–2011), Slovak ethnographer
- Ester Rada (born 1985), Israeli actress and singer
- Ester Reiter (born 1941), American-Canadian historian and sociologist
- Ester Ringnér-Lundgren (1907–1993), Swedish writer
- Ester Roeck-Hansen (1897–1987), Swedish actress
- Ester Samuel-Cahn (1933–2015), Israeli statistician and educator
- Ester Schreiber (born 1997), Swedish fencer
- Ester H. Segal, Israeli nanotechnology researcher
- Ester Šimerová-Martinčeková (1909–2005), Slovak painter
- Ester Sokler (born 1999), Slovenian footballer
- Ester Soldi (born 1970), Italian equestrian
- Ester Somaza (born 2004), Spanish handball player
- Ester Soré (1915–1996), Chilean singer
- Ester Sowernam, English writer
- Ester Ståhlberg (1870–1950), First Lady of Finland
- Ester Textorius (1883–1972), Swedish actress
- Ester Toivonen (1914–1979), Finnish model
- Ester Tuiksoo (born 1965), Estonian politician
- Ester Uzoukwu, Nigerian taekwondo practitioner
- Ester Vázquez (born 1973), Spanish chemist, educator
- Ester Vilarrubla (born 1965), Andorran politician
- Ester Volicerová (born 1971), Czech volleyball player
- Ester Wajcblum (1924–1945), Jewish resistance fighter and Holocaust victim)
- Ester Nurumi Tri Wardoyo (born 2004), Indonesian badminton player
- Ester Weimerová (born 1999), Czech politician and psychologist
- Ester Wier (1910–2000), American writer
- Ester Workel (born 1975), Dutch rower

== See also ==
- Esta (given name)
- Eszter, Hungarian spelling of the name
