= Okello =

Okello (also spelled Okelo) is a common surname of the Luo and Ateker peoples of Uganda, Kenya and Sudan. It may refer to:

== People ==
- Okello Oculi (1942–2025), Ugandan novelist and poet
- Allan Okello (born 2000), Ugandan footballer
- Bazilio Olara-Okello (1929–1990), Ugandan military officer and de facto head of state of Uganda
- David Okello (born 1986), Kenyan footballer
- Emmy Okello (born 1977), Ugandan consultant physician
- Esther Okello Lutwa (died 2002), Ugandan first lady and politician
- Galdino Moro Okello (born 1940), Ugandan judge
- Henry Oryem Okello (born 1960), Ugandan politician
- James Okello (born 1990), Ugandan basketball player
- John Okello (1937–1971), Ugandan-born leader of the Zanzibar revolution
- Noble Okello (born 2000), Ugandan footballer
- Tito Okello (1914–1996), Ugandan military officer and politician, president of Uganda (1985–1986)

== Other uses ==
- Okello, a character in the 1972 film Aguirre, the Wrath of God
