= Mary Anne Everett Green =

English historian (1818–1895)

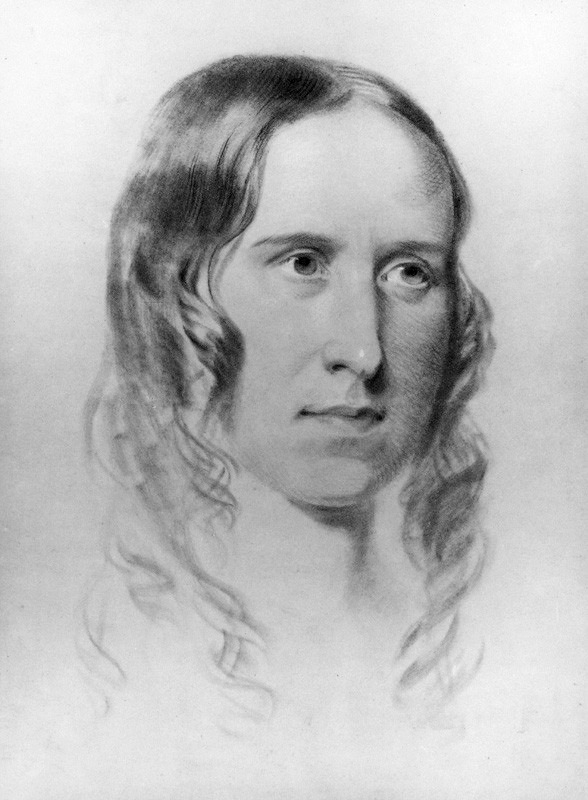
- Drawing from the 1850s by her husband, the artist George Pycock Green (c1811–1893)
- Born: 19 July 1818; Sheffield, England
- Died: 1 November 1895 (aged 77); London, England
- Occupation: Historian

Mary Anne Everett Green (née Wood; 19 July 1818 – 1 November 1895) was an English historian and archival editor. After establishing a reputation for scholarship with two multi-volume books on royal ladies and noblewomen, she was invited to assist in preparing calendars (abstracts) of hitherto disorganised historical state papers. In this role of "calendars editor", she participated in the mid-19th-century initiative to establish a centralised national archive. She was one of the most respected female historians in Victorian Britain.

== Family and early career ==
Mary Anne Everett Wood was born in Sheffield to a Wesleyan Methodist minister, Robert Wood, and his wife Sarah (née Bateson; born Wortley, Leeds, youngest daughter of Matthew Bateson, clothier). Her father was responsible for her education, offering an extensive knowledge of history and languages, and she benefited from mixing with her parents' intellectual friends including James Everett, the minister and writer, for whom she was named.

When the family moved to London in 1841 she began researching in the British Museum and elsewhere. Later she wrote, Letters of Royal and Illustrious Ladies (1846) which was one of the earliest historical writings to document medieval and early modern noblewomen. Her subsequent work, the six-volume Lives of the Princesses of England: from the Norman Conquest (1849–1855) saw her using her skills in Latin and medieval French as well as her access to original manuscripts, letters and charters to create a biography of queens and noblewomen from the 11th century to her own time. She also used private libraries like that of the rich collector Sir Thomas Phillipps, as well as archives like those at Lambeth Palace.

After her marriage to the painter George Pycock Green in 1845, they travelled for the sake of his artistic career, and she was able to research her subject further in Paris and Antwerp. Lives of the Princesses was praised by the antiquary Dawson Turner and by the historian Sir Francis Palgrave among others.

Palgrave, the first Deputy Keeper of the Public Record Office (PRO), had met Green, was impressed with her scholarship, especially her knowledge of languages, and recommended her to his superior John Romilly, the Master of the Rolls. Romilly was continuing Lord Langdale's work of overseeing the establishment of a national archive (the PRO), and publishing some of the documents it held. Numerous state papers which had been assembled from different locations were studied and summarised, and then the abstracts were arranged in chronological order in the form of "calendars".

In 1854, Romilly invited Green to become an external calendars editor. In her first few years doing this work she gave birth to two of her three daughters, one of whom, Evelyn Everett-Green, became a novelist. Mary Anne Everett Green's son had been born in 1847 but died in 1876. Her husband became disabled and it was important for her to earn an income. While supplementing her work at the PRO with journalism, she pursued some private research but had no time to complete a planned book on the Hanoverian queens.

== Public records ==
Unlike the full-time employees doing similar work, such as Sir Thomas Duffus Hardy, and the three male free-lancers working on the calendars, who all had paid assistance, Green's only helper was her sister Esther, but she became the "most highly respected" and "most efficient compiler of calendars". She sometimes complained about being paid less than the men, and also disputed editorial questions with her superiors. Romilly did eventually agree to her suggestion of historical prefaces written by herself and the other editors, and these came to be seen as an essential part of the calendars. Green herself wrote 700 pages of prefaces which amount to a history of seventeenth-century England.

Over the next four decades Green edited 41 volumes starting with Calendar of State Papers, Domestic Series, of the Reign of James I (4 volumes, 1857–9). By the time she completed Calendar of State Papers, Domestic Series, of the Reign of Elizabeth in 1872, reviewers considered she had established a model for such work; with more detailed abstracts than many other calendars, as well as the highest standards of scholarship, her work "came to be recognized as the standard to be followed by all editors".

Like other 19th-century women historians, Green tended to concentrate her work in fields seen as suited to "feminine" talents: research into queens and ladies, private lives, and the deciphering, translation and compilation of historical documents, for instance. One of her earliest books was prefaced by her asking the reader not to criticise her for having "ventured upon a field usually occupied only by the learned of the opposite sex." Her calendar prefaces, though, were an opportunity to write on broader, more "masculine" themes, like the Interregnum, earning respect for the overall quality and "strict historical accuracy".

She was one of only three women to sign a public petition in 1851 asking the PRO to offer free access to its records for serious scholars, a request which was granted in 1852. Alongside 80 men's signatures, including those of Charles Dickens, Macaulay, and Carlyle, were the women historians who depended on detailed study of freshly discovered original sources to claim authority for their work: Agnes Strickland and Lucy Aikin were the other two.

Green went on working at the PRO until shortly before she died, aged 77, at home in London on 1 November 1895, having passed her research on the Hanoverian queens to her friend A. W. Ward. Her work at the PRO was continued by the niece she had trained: Sophia Crawford Lomas. Both Ward and Lomas helped ensure that her Elizabeth, Electress Palatine and Queen of Bohemia (1909) appeared posthumously. She also intended to publish an edition of the letters of Elizabeth Stuart, Queen of Bohemia and collected over 400 transcripts. Other books of hers include Diary of John Rous (1856) and Letters of Queen Henrietta Maria (1857).

== Work online ==
- Letters of Royal and Illustrious Ladies of Great Britain: Volume 1
- Letters of Royal and Illustrious Ladies of Great Britain: Volume 2
- Letters of Royal and Illustrious Ladies of Great Britain: Volume 3
- Lives of the Princesses of England, from the Norman Conquest
- Calendar of State Papers Domestic: James I, 1603-1610

== Sources ==
- Krueger, Christine L. (2003). "Why she lived at the PRO: Mary Anne Everett Green and the profession of history". Journal of British Studies. 42 (1): 65–90.
- Laurence, Anne (2000). "Women historians and documentary research: Lucy Aikin, Agnes Strickland, Mary Anne Everett Green, and Lucy Toulmin Smith". In Bellamy, Joan; Laurence, Anne; Perry, Gill (eds.). Women, Scholarship and Criticism: gender and knowledge, c.1790–1900. Manchester: Manchester University Press. ISBN 9780719057199.
- Levine, Philippa (1986). The Amateur and the Professional: antiquarians, historians and archaeologists in Victorian England, 1838–1886. Cambridge: Cambridge University Press. ISBN 0-521-30635-3.
- Barker, G. F. R.; Mooney, Hugh (revised) (2004). "Bickersteth, Henry, Baron Langdale (1783–1851)". Oxford Dictionary of National Biography (online ed.). Oxford University Press. doi:10.1093/ref:odnb/2348. (Subscription, Wikipedia Library access or UK public library membership required.)
- Hamilton, J. A.; Polden, Patrick (2008) [2004]. "Romilly, John, first Baron Romilly (1802–1874)". Oxford Dictionary of National Biography (online ed.). Oxford University Press. doi:10.1093/ref:odnb/24048. (Subscription, Wikipedia Library access or UK public library membership required.)
- Chaplais, Pierre (1995). "The Public Record Office, 1838–1958 (HMSO, 1991) by John D. Cantwell [review]". English Historical Review. 110 (435): 233–235.
- New International Encyclopedia
