= Uzodinma =

uzodinma
- Gender: Unisex
- Language(s): Igbo

Origin
- Word/name: Nigeria
- Meaning: may my future/life path be good

Uzodinma is both a given name and a surname in Nigeria. Notable people with the name include:

- Uzodinma Iweala, Nigerian-American author
- Esther Uzodinma, Nigerian actress
- John Chidi Uzodinma (born 1994), Nigerian footballer

== See also ==
- Hope Uzodimma (born 1958), Nigerian politician
