= Eva Warigia =

Kenyan business executive

- Born: Kenya
- Education: University of Nairobi (bachelor's degree); Strathmore University (MBA)
- Occupations: Businesswoman; corporate executive
- Title: Executive director of East Africa Private Equity & Venture Capital Association (EAVCA)

Eva Warigia is a Kenyan businesswoman and corporate executive. She serves as the executive director of the East Africa Private Equity & Venture Capital Association (EAVCA), based in Nairobi, Kenya. EAVCA is an industry association of venture capitalists active in the region, whose aim is "to raise awareness and engage on regional policy matters".

== Background and education ==
Warigia was born in Kenya and attended local elementary and secondary schools. She has a bachelor's degree from the University of Nairobi. As of May 2020, she was pursuing a Master of Business Administration, from Strathmore Business School in Nairobi.

== Career ==
Warigia's involvement in the venture capital arena goes back to the early 2010s. In 2017, she was appointed as co-executive director at EAVCA, to serve with Esther Ndeti. Their joint responsibility is to increase "advocacy, intelligence, networking and training on private equity" in the region.

At EAVCA, she oversees collaboration with trade associations, incubators and accelerators to grow local awareness of venture capital and private equity, as alternative sources of capital. EAVCA carries out industry-specific research highlighting opportunities that exist in East Africa. Warigia covers the countries of Ethiopia, Kenya, Tanzania, Rwanda and Uganda.

Prior to her employment at EAVCA, Warigia worked as a senior consultant at Africa Practice (East Africa), a Nairobi-based public relations company.
