= Eversman =

Eversman is a German surname, possibly a derivative of Evert. Notable people with the name include:

- Alice Eversman (1885–1974), American opera singer
- Nick Eversman (born 1986), American actor
