= Kyung-ju (name) =

- Hangul: 경주
- RR: Gyeongju
- MR: Kyŏngju

Kyung-ju, also spelled Kyung-joo or Kyong-ju, is a Korean given name.

People with this name include:

- Howard Koh (Korean name Koh Kyongju, born 1952), American male public health official of Korean descent
- Esther K. Chae (Korean name Chae Kyung-ju, born 1968), South Korean-born American actress
- K. J. Choi (Korean name Choi Kyung-ju, born 1970), South Korean male professional golfer
- Kim Kyung-ju (born 1976), South Korean male poet and performance artist
- Esther Hahn (Korean name Hahn Kyung-joo, born 1985), American female surfer of Korean descent
- Kim Kyong-ju, North Korean female diver; Asian Games bronze medalist in diving, 2002

Fictional characters with this name include:

- Kim Kyung-joo, female supporting character in 2011 South Korean television series Glory Jane
- Oh Kyung-joo, female supporting character in 2013 South Korean television series Good Doctor

== See also ==
- List of Korean given names
