= Esther Warkov =

Esther Warkov may refer to:

- Esther Warkov (activist)
- Esther Warkov (artist)
