= Barbara Joyce Abang =

Ugandan writer, mental health advocate

Barbara Joyce Abang is a Ugandan writer, mental health advocate and practicing layer and State Attorney working for the government of Uganda. In her work, Barbara advocates for mental health financing to support mental health patients and as well advocates for East African nations to prioritize mental health and have affordable services in Ugandan communities. She has also authored a book "Be Kind to Your Mind".

== Career ==
Barbara pursued a master's degree in law from University of Birmingham.

== Personal life ==
Barbara experienced Bipolar disorder while pursuing her master's degree in Law degree at University of Burmingham.

== See also ==
- Perry Aritua
- Diana Angwech
- Esta Nambayo
- Ruth Sebatindira
