= Esther Sittler =

French politician (born 1952)

Esther Sittler (born 9 May 1952) is a member of the Senate of France, representing the Bas-Rhin department. She is a member of the Union for a Popular Movement.

An administrative secretary by profession, she was elected Senator September 26, 2004 and February 20, 2005. Her position remained vacant from November 27, 2004 to February 19, 2005, following a cancellation of the vote.

== Current positions ==
- 2008–2014 : Mayor of Herbsheim
- 2004–2013 : Senator of Bas-Rhin (re-elected in 2005 following the vote cancellation)

== Former positions ==
- 1995–2001 : Mayor of Herbsheim
- 1989–1995 : Mayor of Herbsheim
- 1983–1989 : Mayor of Herbsheim
