= Esther Majambere Musoke =

Ugandan lawyer

- Citizenship: Ugandan
- Occupations: Lawyer, Advocate, Legislator and politician.
- Known for: She has participated in the training of other lawyer in partnership with the financial intelligence Authority of Uganda.

Esther Majambere Musoke is a practicing Ugandan lawyer, advocate, legislator and politician. She is an elected member of the Parliament of Uganda representing the constituents of Kyeshero sub-county in Kinkiizi West in Kanungu District. She has served as the Principal Legal Officer ans secretary at the Uganda Law Reforms Commission. She has participated in training other lawyers in partnership with the Financial Intelligence Authority of Uganda to ensure they are compliant and avoid money laundering.

Esther Majambere Musoke offers occasionally to supports primary school children in Kanungu district with scholastic materials to improve their education.

== Personal ==
Esther Majambere Musoke lost her father to stroke from Nsambya hospital at the age of 89.

== See also ==
- Periry Aritua
- Diana Angwech
- Sarah Bireete
