= Esther Cohen =

Mexican writer and academic (born 1949)

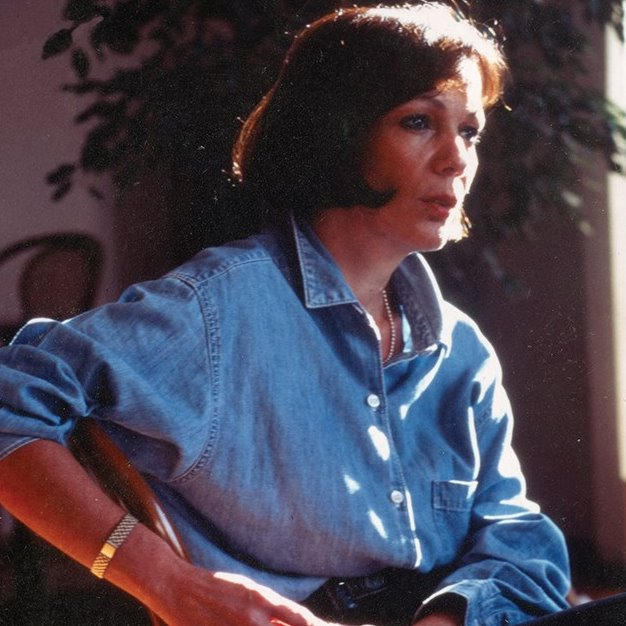
Esther Cohen

Esther Cohen Dabah (born 1949) is a Mexican writer and academic.

== Early life ==
Esther Cohen Dabah was born in Mexico City, Mexico, in 1949. Her parents were both Jewish immigrants to Mexico: Her father was Moisés Cohen, who immigrated from Turkey, and her mother was Sarah Dabah de Cohen, who came from Syria.

Cohen began her studies at the National Autonomous University of Mexico (UNAM), where she received a master's degree in modern English literature. She subsequently received a PhD from the same institution.

== Career ==
Cohen began teaching at UNAM in 1975. She became a researcher at UNAM's Institute of Philological Research, where she has led the Poetry Center. In 2015, she began overseeing the center's magazine, Acta Poética. In 2019, she was honored as a member of the university's emeritus staff.

In 1982, Cohen traveled to the University of Bologna in Italy, where she studied semiotics under the writer and philosopher Umberto Eco. Her research has frequently dealt with Kabbalah, a form of Jewish mysticism, including during the medieval period. She has also published works on the persecution of witches in Renaissance Europe, as well as on historical memory and narrative of the Holocaust. Her work is heavily influenced by the scholars Emmanuel Levinas, Jacques Derrida, and Walter Benjamin.

She has published a wide variety of essays and translations in both domestic and international journals. She is a translator of English, French, Italian, and Portuguese, having produced her first work of translation in 1994 for a collection on the Zohar, a foundational Kabbalah text.

Cohen received the National University Prize in 2010 for her work in the humanities. That same year, she also won the Manuel Levinsky Prize from the Mexican Association of Jewish Writers and Journalists.

Since 2011, she has also served as director of the Memory and Tolerance Museum's Education Center.

== Selected works ==
- La palabra inconclusa (1994)
- El silencio del nombre (1999)
- Con el diablo en el cuerpo. Filósofos y brujas en el Renacimiento (2003)
- Los narradores de Auschwitz (2006)
- La huella del otro (editor)
- Ejercicios de memoria (editor)
