= Esther de Pommery =

Swiss activist

- Born: Bern, Switzerland
- Occupations: noblewoman of Lambrey, activist, Founder of Esther de Pommery Comtesse de Lambrey Foundation
- Website: Official Website

Esther de Pommery (was born in Bern) – Countess of Lambrey, is a Swiss activist, founder of Esther de Pommery Comtesse de Lambrey Foundation. She studied obstetrics at the University of Bern and archaeology in the University of Paris. She speaks English, German, French and Italian.

== Organizations ==
- Esther de Pommery Comtesse de Lambrey Foundation, Switzerland
- Former ambassador of Red Cross (Eyesight)
- Former ambassador of the Helping Hand Coalition, Israel
- Former ambassador of Yad Sarah, Jerusalem, Israel
- Former member of the board of directors of The European Fine Art Foundations, Monte Carlo
- Former member of the board of directors of World Youth Talent, founded by Roger Moore
- Former member of the UNESCO Arts of Culture Committee, Paris
- Former member of the board of trustees University of Basle
- Former patronage of various music and dance schools (Bucharest, Sofia, Klusch)
- Honorary doctorate by International Medical Association of Bulgaria, Varna
- Former honorary chairperson for Romanian Relief Efforts, Basle, Switzerland
- Former director of the annual charity Christmas concert of the City of Basle
- Former music management for dancers, CID, Athens
- Former researching for dance in African cultures
- Former member of the International Committee to the Rector Sojza University
- Humanitarian efforts for Bulgaria
- Honorary membership of two cities in Romania, Anina and Bucharest
- New hospital, Esther de Pommery" was built in Montana, Bulgaria
- Former member of Flying Doctors" for Nigeria
- Former president of the new founded Israel to the Nations"
- Former CO of the Ombudsman Bulgaria, patron of Human Rights

=== Honours (awards, distinctions) ===
- Humanitarians GO & NGO
- Member of the UNESCO.
- Honorary doctorate international
- Member of "Flying Doctors" Nigeria.
- New hospital "Esther de Pommery" built in Montana, Bulgaria, by King Simeon, prime minister of Bulgaria.
- Member of the board of trustees University of Basle, Switzerland.
