= Esther Clark Wright =

Canadian historian (1895–1990)

Esther Isabelle Wright, CM (née Clark; 1895 – June 17, 1990) was a Canadian historian who at the end of her life received the Order of Canada for her lifetime contributions to Canadian scholarship. She published many works in relation to her historic and genealogical research and was best known for her pioneer and genealogy studies of Nova Scotia and New Brunswick, Canada.

== Life and work ==
Esther Isabelle Clark was born in Fredericton, New Brunswick in 1895, daughter of a former alderman of that city, and later Lieutenant Governor of New Brunswick W. G. Clark. She graduated from Acadia University in Wolfville, Nova Scotia with an Honours degree in Economics (1916). In 1919, she was granted a pastorage from the Baptist Church (Fredericton) and accepted a posting as pastor to Grangeville, Kent County, New Brunswick. She thus became the first female pastor in the province. She later undertook further academic study at the University of Toronto, Oxford University and Stanford University, and graduated from Radcliffe/Harvard University with a PhD in Economic History in 1931. Esther Clark married Conrad Payling Wright on July 31, 1924, on a farm outside of Fredericton, New Brunswick. She lectured on sociology at Acadia University from 1943 to 1947.

Esther began her writing career as a young woman with Public Opinion (1916) and The Challenge to Canadian Womanhood (1918), her first published works. She eventually authored fifteen books and numerous articles on a wide range of subjects including regional histories, family histories and autobiography, though she is best known for her studies of pioneering groups in Maritime Canada. In 1988, Acadiensis published an extensive bibliography of Esther Clark Wright's publications.

Wright held office in many organizations. She served as President of the New Brunswick Association of Consumers, 1950–1952; Vice-President of the National Council of Women of Canada, 1950–1953; and Vice-President of the Canadian Federation of University Women, 1952–1955.

=== Notable works ===
==== The Loyalists of New Brunswick ====
Among the best known of her many written works is The Loyalists of New Brunswick (1955), which has been referred to as the "red Loyalist Bible" due to its extensive information about New Brunswick Loyalists, or people who remained loyal to Britain after the American Revolutionary War and were compelled to leave New England. It includes a description of the harsh conditions the Loyalists faced and its appendix has a list of names including their origins, their service during the war, and where they later settled in New Brunswick.

==== Planters and Pioneers, Nova Scotia, 1749-1775 ====
Planters and Pioneers, Nova Scotia, 1749-1775 (1978, revised 1982) was another important work. Planters and Pioneers is an index of New England and European settlers who came to Nova Scotia (and what later became New Brunswick) ten to fifteen years before the American Revolution. It includes names of settlers who already lived in the area during the period of 1749–1775. Wright believed that "pre-Loyalist" immigrants to Nova Scotia had a much more significant contribution to Canadian and American history that had been previously thought or known, and she created the index with the hope of bringing their contribution to light. A limited edition of Planters and Pioneers was reprinted in 2007.

==== Samphire Greens ====
Samphire Greens: The Story of the Steeves (1961) and The Steeves Descendants (1965) together provided a monumental (1,000 page) genealogical study of a pioneering New Brunswick family Pennsylvania German descent. In this work, Wright traced thousands of descendants of the founder of the Steeves line, Heinrich Stief down to the 10th generation.

==== Blomidon Rose ====
This is an autobiographical story (published in 1957) of the people and land in and around Wolfville, Nova Scotia. In her book she describes the community in the pre-war years while she was still a student there through to the decline of the railway in the mid-1950s. The title comes from a line in Longfellow's Evangeline.

==== Back a Long Way ====
When she was 91 years old, Wright published a collection of random reminiscences called Back a Long Way (1986). The book includes short fictional stories.

=== Unfinished project ===
She wrote books on the Saint John, Petitcodiac and Miramichi rivers over several years. After completing studies of shipbuilding in Saint John and St. Martins in the mid-1970s, she intended to write a book about the Bay of Fundy. That work was never completed. When she published her last book, Back a Long Way she wrote, "[This book] was fun to put together, and a partial consolation for not being able, because of various contretemps, to complete the book on the Bay of Fundy."

== Awards and recognition ==
In 1990, her husband, Conrad Wright, accepted the Order of Canada on her behalf from the Governor General of Canada, Ray Hnatyshyn at a ceremony held in the Wolfville Town Hall. Her pioneering work on the New England Planters was recognized in 1987 when Dr. Wright was proclaimed the first Planter Scholar during the New England Planters Maritime Canada conference. She died in July 1990. Following her death, Acadia University named its Archives in her honour - The Esther Clark Wright Archives.

She held honorary degrees from Acadia University, Dalhousie University and the University of New Brunswick. In 1975, she was awarded a D. Litt. from Acadia University, and in 1981 an LI.D from Dalhousie University.
