= Memory and Tolerance Museum =

Mexican museum

- Museo Memoria y Tolerancia
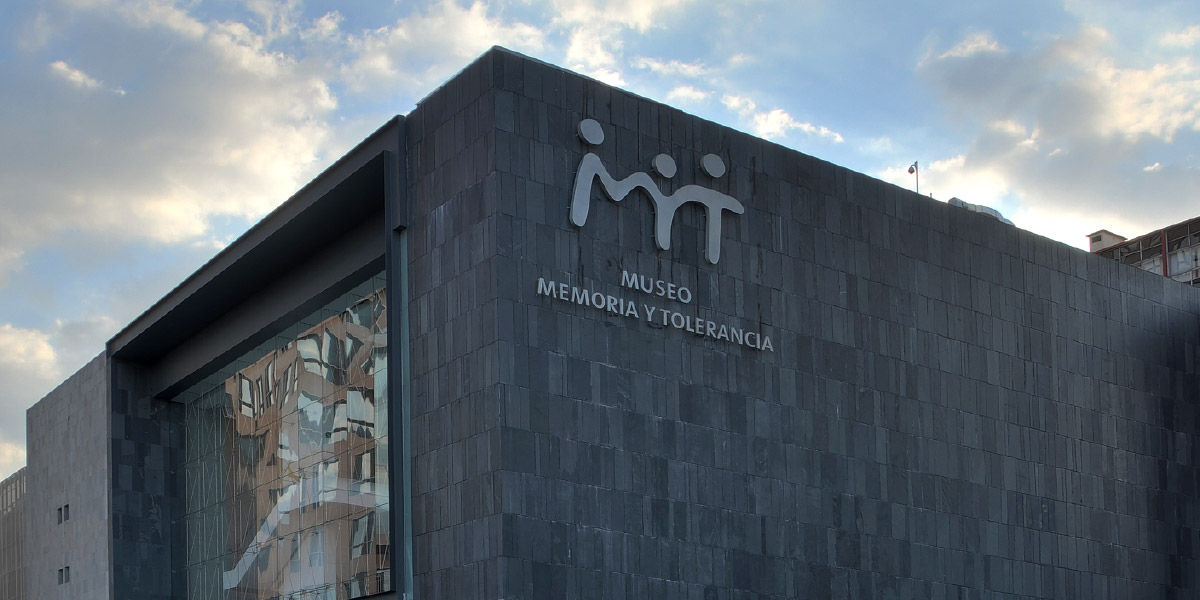
- The museum's exterior in 2012
- Location: Mexico City, Mexico
- Coordinates: 19.434165°N 99.144630°W

The Memory and Tolerance Museum (Spanish: Museo Memoria y Tolerancia) is a museum in Mexico City, Mexico, established in 2010. It has exhibits about genocide, including the holocaust, the Armenian Genocide, the Rwandan genocide, the Bosnian War, the Guatemalan genocide, the Darfur conflict and the Cambodian genocide. It tries to promote respect for diversity and tolerance.
