= Esther Edwards =

Esther Edwards can refer to:

- Esther Edwards Burr (1732–1758), wife of Aaron Burr, Sr. and mother of Aaron Burr, Jr.
- Esther Edwards Conner (1875–1943), mother of Bolivar Edwards Kemp, Jr.
- Esther Gordy Edwards (1920–2011), American businesswoman
