= Ester Hofvander-Sandberg =

Swedish lawyer (1888–1967)

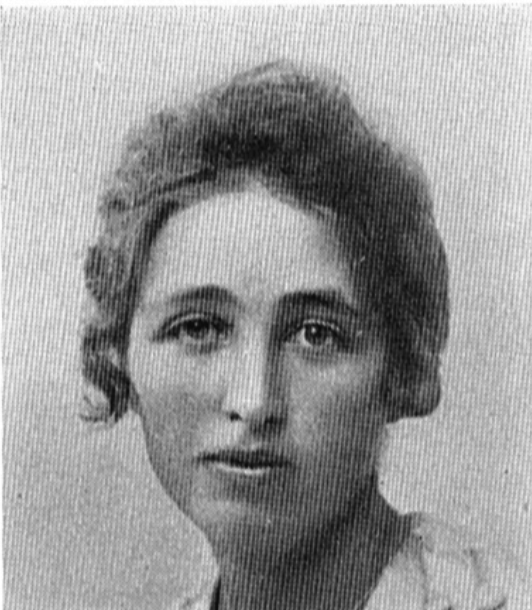
Hofvander-Sandberg in 1920

Ester Eugenia Hofvander-Sandberg (10 February 1888 – 7 October 1967) was one of Sweden's first female lawyers.

Born in Skårby, Hofvander-Sandberg started studies at the law faculty of Lund University in 1911. She graduated with a jur. kand. degree in May 1915. She was the seventh woman in Sweden to complete the degree.

As a lawyer, Hofvander-Sandberg was known to be an energetic and sharp lawyer, and she ran her processes with an iron hand. For her efforts during her professional life, Hofvander-Sandberg was named a member of the first class of the Order of Vasa in November 1955. Hofvander-Sandberg died in Eslöv.
