= Esther Anderson =

Esther Anderson may refer to:

- Esther Anderson (Jamaican actress) (born 1943), Jamaican filmmaker, photographer and actress
- Esther Anderson (Australian actress) (born 1979), Australian actress and model
- Esther Anderson (Sanford and Son), fictional character in Sanford and Son
