= Esther Ongley =

New Zealand lawyer

Esther Ellen Ongley was a New Zealand lawyer. She was one of the first women to graduate in law and work as a lawyer in New Zealand.

Ongley was educated at Waitaki Girls' High School and studied for a Bachelor of Arts degree at Victoria University of Wellington, graduating in 1916. She then moved to the University of Otago and completed a law degree in 1919. Ongley was admitted to the bar in 1921, becoming the eighth woman to be admitted in New Zealand. She spent her career working for a law firm in Wellington.
