= Esther Rodriguez-Villegas =

Spanish engineer, inventor

Esther Olivia Rodriguez-Villegas
- Born: Sanlúcar de Barrameda, Cádiz, Spain
- Education: University of Seville (BS, PhD)
- Scientific career
- Workplaces: Imperial College London
- Thesis: Low voltage and low power analog and digital design with the floating gate MOS transistor (FGMOS) (2002)

Esther Rodriguez-Villegas FREng (born in Sanlúcar de Barrameda, Cádiz) is a Spanish engineer, inventor and the Professor of Low Power Electronics at Imperial College London. Rodriguez-Villegas develops lightweight, low-power electronic devices for real-time monitoring of physiological signals. She was awarded the 2020 Royal Academy of Engineering Silver Medal for her work on wearable medical devices. In 2020, she was elected a Fellow of the Royal Academy of Engineering.

== Early life and education ==
Rodriguez-Villegas attended the University of Seville where she earned both her master's and doctoral degrees. She was selected as the top student of the year, being awarded the San Alberto Magno Prize. Her doctoral research considered floating-gate MOSFETs. After graduating, she was awarded a research grant by the Government of Spain and joined the Institute of Microelectronics of Barcelona.

== Research and career ==
In 2002, Rodriguez-Villegas joined Imperial College London, where she was eventually promoted to Professor of Low Power Electronics. She works on low-power circuitry for medical diagnostics. Her circuits are capable of the highly accurate monitoring of physiological signals, allowing researchers to model the processes behind disease. These models allow not only the monitoring of medical conditions but also offer diagnostic capabilities. She is most interested in brain and respiratory conditions. In 2010, she was awarded a European Research Council (ERC) Starting Grant to develop wearable technologies for the diagnosis and monitoring of epilepsy.

In 2004, Rodriguez-Villegas was approached by the Epilepsy Society to create a low-power microelectronic device to monitor for sleep apnoea. The society believed that her technology could prevent sudden unexpected death in epilepsy (SUDEP). Based on her work on sensitive monitoring of sleep apnoea, she founded Acurable in 2016. Acurable has been supported by Innovate UK and Microsoft. Acurable created the AcuPebble sensor, which allows the accurate diagnosis and management of respiratory conditions through the monitoring of acoustic signals with astounding accuracy. The device can help patients to manage conditions including apnoea, chronic obstructive pulmonary disease (COPD) and whooping cough. It was successfully validated by the National Health Service in 2019 and achieved a CE mark in 2020.

Alongside the AcuPebble, Rodriguez-Villegas has worked on a wireless, lightweight (1.5g), low-power device (the TaiNi) that can monitor the brains of mice for three days. The ability to read information remotely reduces the amount of time that researchers have to handle mice, minimising the stress the mice experience, and the light weight affords the mice greater freedom of movement.

During the COVID-19 pandemic, Rodriguez-Villegas worked with a team of volunteers to design a contact-tracing app. Apple would only support one government-sponsored app per country, and Rodriguez-Villegas' was not continued.

== Awards and honours ==
- 2007 Johnson & Johnson Proof of Concept Award
- 2009 Complutense University of Madrid Top Scientist in Spain under the age of 36
- 2009 Institution of Engineering and Technology Award in Information and Communications Technology
- 2014 X Prize Foundation Nokia Sensing XCHALLENGE Distinguished Award
- 2018 Association for Assessment and Accreditation of Laboratory Animal Care International Global 3Rs Award
- 2020 Royal Academy of Engineering Silver Medal
- 2020 Finalist in the FDM Everywoman in Technology Academic Award
- 2020 Elected Fellow of the Royal Academy of Engineering
- 2021 Merit Award of the Society of Spanish Researchers in the United Kingdom (SRUK/CERU).
- 2024 IEEE Fellow

== Select publications ==
- Rodriguez-Villegas, E.; Barnes, H. (18 September 2003). "Solution to trapped charge in FGMOS transistors". Electronics Letters. 39 (19): 1416–1417. Bibcode:2003ElL....39.1416R. doi:10.1049/el:20030900. ISSN 1350-911X.
- Corbishley, Phil; Rodriguez-Villegas, Esther (2008). "Breathing Detection: Towards a Miniaturized, Wearable, Battery-Operated Monitoring System". IEEE Transactions on Biomedical Engineering. 55 (1): 196–204. doi:10.1109/TBME.2007.910679. ISSN 1558-2531. PMID 18232362. S2CID 206610032.
- Casson, Alexander J.; Yates, David C.; Smith, Shelagh J.M.; Duncan, John S.; Rodriguez-Villegas, Esther (2010). "Wearable Electroencephalography". IEEE Engineering in Medicine and Biology Magazine. 29 (3): 44–56. doi:10.1109/MEMB.2010.936545. hdl:10044/1/5910. ISSN 1937-4186. PMID 20659857. S2CID 1891995.
