= Esther Polak =

Dutch artist (born 1962)

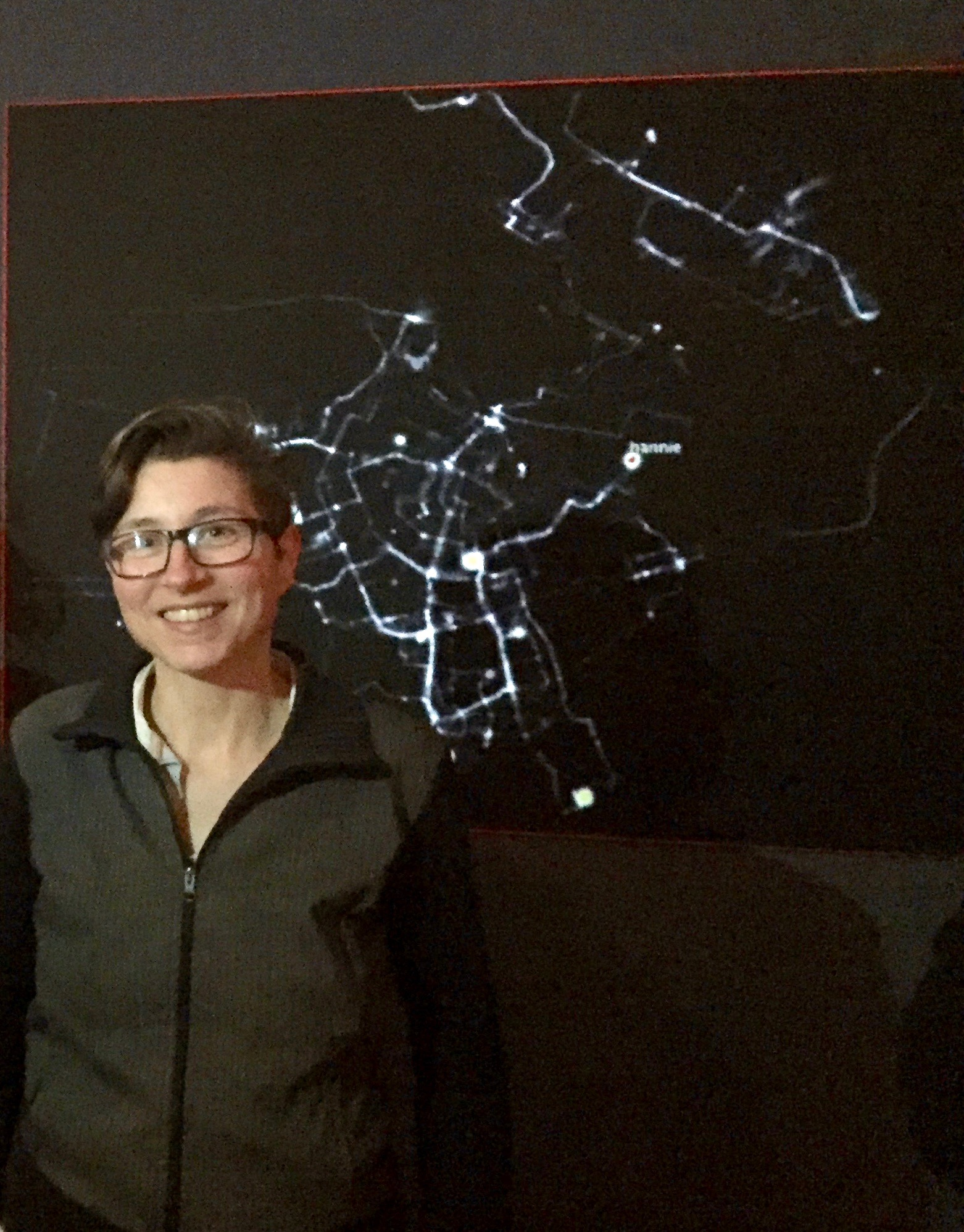
Esther Polak at the RealTime project during the opening of Made in Amsterdam - 100 years in 100 works of art at the Amsterdam Museum.

Esther Polak (born 1962) is a Dutch visual artist. She is active in the new media field and was one of the first artists to experiment with GPS. Since 2010, Polak has worked full-time with Ivar van Bekkum as an artist duo PolakVanBekkum. She lives and works in Amsterdam.

== Career ==
Esther Polak studied painting at the Royal Academy of Art in The Hague (1981-1986) and then mixed media at the Rijksakademie van Beeldende Kunsten in Amsterdam (1986-1989).

Her interest lies in capturing movement in a landscape. Polak gained notoriety with her "locative media" projects, such as Amsterdam RealTime (collaboration with Waag Society and Jeroen Kee), MILKproject (collaboration with researcher Ieva Auzina and RIXC) and NomadicMILK. These projects use GPS to arrive at a contemporary landscape representation.

In addition to using GPS, Google Earth as an artistic medium plays a vital role in her video work. Unlike other 3D worlds, Google Earth represents a 1-to-1 relationship with the world as we know it, and this representation also carries a political, social, and economic reality. Video works using Google Earth include A Collision of Sorts (2017), Going To Be/Go Move Be (2018) and The Ride/The Ride (2019).

== Works ==
- 2019 The Ride/The Ride (installation/film)
- 2019 Pendulum (Performance)
- 2018 Going To Be/Go Move Be (film)
- 2017 A Collision of Sorts (short film)
- 2016 The Mailman's Bag (installation/film)
- 2008-present Spiral Drawing Sunrise (performance)
- 2007-2009 NomadicMILK
- 2004-2005 MILKproject
- 2002 Amsterdam RealTime

== Awards and nominations ==
- 2017 Nomination Golden Calf for A Collision of Sorts
- 2016 Special Mention 2Annas FF
- 2016 Expanded Media Preis Network Culture
- 2015 Nomination Academy Award for Astronomy and Art
- 2005 Golden Nica Interactive Art, Prix Ars Electronica, Linz, Austria
- 2004 Gada Balva art prize, Riga, Latvia
