= Esther Sternberg =

Canadian professor of medicine and researcher (born 1951)

- Born: 1951 (age 74–75); Montreal, Canada
- Citizenship: U.S.
- Education: McGill University
- Occupations: Professor of medicine, researcher
- Employer: University of Arizona
- Known for: Research on brain-immune system interactions, mind-body connection, place and wellbeing

Esther Sternberg (born in 1951 in Montreal) is a professor of medicine and researcher. She currently holds the Inaugural Andrew Weil Chair for Research in Integrative Medicine and serves as research director for the Andrew Weil Center for Integrative Medicine at the University of Arizona. She is also the Founding Director of the UArizona Institute on Place, Wellbeing & Performance.

== Biography ==
Esther Sternberg holds a medical degree from McGill University 1974. As senior scientist and section chief at the National Institutes of Health (NIH) (1986-2012), she served as chief of the Section on Neuroendocrine Immunology & Behavior at the National Institute of Mental Health, director of the Integrative Neural Immune Program, and co-chair of the NIH Intramural Program on Research on Women's Health.

She is known for her pioneering discoveries on the interactions between the brain and the immune system, and the relationships between health and emotions and place and wellbeing. Her research has helped establish the field of brain-immune interactions and the science of the mind-body connection. In 1989 she led the NIH-CDC-FDA research team that uncovered the cause of the L-Tryptophan Eosinophilia Myalgia Syndrome epidemic, caused by ingesting the impure amino acid supplement L-Tryptophan. For these contributions, she was recognized by the National Library of Medicine as one of the women physicians who "Changed the Face of Medicine." Her over 2 decades of work with the U.S General Services Administration using wearable health tracking devices to measure the impacts of built office environments on health and wellbeing have provided a prescription for healthy, wellbeing workspaces and are being used to inform post-COVID re-entry across the federal government.

== Awards and recognition ==
- Honorary Degree of Doctor in Medicine (Doctorate Honoris Causa) from Trinity College Dublin
- U.S. Public Health Service Superior Service Award
- FDA Commissioner's Special Citation
- Host of PBS Special "The Science of Healing" (2009)
- NIH Anita B. Roberts "Distinguished Women Scientists at NIH Lectureship" (2012)
- Distinguished Speaker: “Healing Spaces: The Science of Place & Wellbeing,” XXVII International Conference of the Pontifical Council for Health Care Workers. The Vatican. Vatican City, Nov. 2012
- Chair, board of regents, National Library of Medicine, Bethesda, MD (2018)
- WELL at WORK: Creating Wellbeing in Any Workspace longlisted for Outstanding Works of Literature (OWL) Award (2023)

== Publications ==
She has written numerous scientific articles published in leading journals including Science, Nature Reviews Immunology, Nature Medicine, The New England Journal of Medicine, Scientific American, JAMA, and Proceedings of the National Academy of Sciences.

=== Books ===
- Sternberg, Esther M. (2001). The Balance Within: The Science Connecting Health and Emotions. W.H.Freeman & Co Ltd. ISBN 978-0-7167-4445-0.
- Sternberg, Esther M. (2009). Healing Spaces: The Science of Place and Well-being. Harvard University Press.
- Sternberg, Esther M. (2023). WELL at WORK: Creating Wellbeing in Any Workspace. Little, Brown Spark.

== See also ==
- Integrative medicine
- Mind-body connection
