= Esther Stoeckli =

Swiss neuroscientist and researcher (born 1961)

- Born: Esther Stoeckli
- Education: University of Zurich
- Known for: neural development, neural circuit formation, axon guidance
- Scientific career
- Fields: Neuroscience
- Workplaces: University of Zurich
- Doctoral advisor: Prof. Peter Sonderegger
- Website: www.mls.uzh.ch/en/research/stoeckli

Esther Stoeckli is a Swiss neuroscientist at the University of Zurich and the director of the Institute of Molecular Life Sciences. Her research focuses on the molecular mechanisms that underlie the establishment of neuronal circuits.

== Education ==
Stoeckli pursued her undergraduate studies in Biochemistry at the University of Zurich in 1980 and then followed with her doctorate studies in the same department under the supervision of Professor Peter Sonderegger. Her Ph.D. thesis was devoted to the identification and characterisation of proteins secreted from axons during neurogenesis. Later in 2000, she received the Venia legendi for Neuroscience at the University of Basel.

== Career ==
After her PhD, Stoeckli stayed in the laboratory of Professor Peter Sonderegger for two more years as a postdoctoral fellow from 1990 to 1992. Afterward, she moved to Cleveland to join the laboratory of Professor Lynn Landmesser at the Case Western Reserve University in 1993, where she studied the guidance of chick commissural neurons and of axon guidance cues. In 1996, she continued this project in the Department of Anatomy of the University of California San Francisco with Professor Marc Tessier-Lavigne. Stoeckli started her professorship track as a START-fellow in the Department of Integrative Biology of the University of Basel in 1997. Thereafter, she obtained the position of associate professor in the Department of Zoology of the University of Zurich. In 2010, Esther became an associate professor at the Institute of Molecular Life Sciences at the University of Zurich. Since 2012, she is full professor and the director of the Molecular Life Sciences institute. Her lab's research focuses on the molecular mechanisms that underlie the establishment of neuronal circuits.
