= Ester H. Segal =

Israeli nanotechnology researcher

- אסתר סגל
- Education: Technion - Israel Institute of Technology (B.Sc, M.Sc, PhD)
- Scientific career
- Fields: porous silicon biosensors food packaging
- Workplaces: Technion - Israel Institute of Technology (2007 - current)
- Doctoral advisor: Moshe Narkis

Ester H. Segal (Hebrew: אסתר סגל) is an Israeli nanotechnology researcher and professor in the Department of Biotechnology and Food Engineering at the Technion - Israel Institute of Technology, where she heads the Laboratory for Multifunctional Nanomaterials. She is also affiliated with the Russell Berrie Nanotechnology Institute at the Technion - Israel Institute of Technology. Segal is a specialist in porous silicon nanomaterials, as well as nanocomposite materials for active packaging technologies to extend the shelf life of food.

== Education ==
Segal received her bachelor of science degree in chemical engineering from the Technion - Israel Institute of Technology in 1997. She earned her master of science degree and PhD from the Technion in polymer science.

== Research and career ==
Segal competed her graduate research with Moshe Narkis at the Technion - Israel Institute of Technology, where she developed electrically conductive polymer systems and their application as sensors for volatile organic compounds. After completing her PhD in 2004, Segal was awarded the Rothschild Postdoctoral Fellowship and joined the group of Michael J. Sailor at the Department of Chemistry and Biochemistry at the University of California, San Diego from 2004 to 2007. There, she developed porous silicon nanomaterials for drug delivery and optical biosensing purposes. In 2007, She returned to Israel and joined the Department of Biotechnology and Food Engineering at the Technion - Israel Institute of Technology to begin her own research lab. She was promoted to full professor in 2019. Since January 2025, she serves as the Dean of the Department of Biotechnology and Food Engineering at the Technion.

Her research lab focuses on coupling materials science with chemistry and biotechnology to address problems in food technology and medicine. Specific areas include optical biosensing, silicon-based therapeutics, silicon-polymer hybrids, and food packaging technologies.

=== Optical biosensors ===
Fabry-Perot interferometers

Using electrochemical etched mesoporous silicon, Segal's research group has developed label-free, optical sensors by means of Fabry-Perot interferometry. These sensors, containing pores between 10 and 100 nm detect analytes such as proteins, DNA, whole bacteria cells, amphipathic molecules on lipid bilayers, organophosphorus compounds, heavy metal ions, and proteolytic products from enzymatic activity. Some of these sensors have been integrated with isotachophoresis and/or engineered with specific surface functions (e.g. attached proteins, enzymes, aptamers, and antimicrobial peptides) to enhance the limits of detection for analytes. She has helped engineer hybrid porous silicon materials for sensing purposes, including carbon dot-infused silicon transducers, hydrogel-confined silicon substrates, and polymer-silicon hybrids.

Diffraction gratings

Segal's research group engineered microstructured silicon optical sensors for the detection of microorganisms, including bacteria and fungi, in clinical samples and food. The microstructured substrates serve as reflective diffraction gratings for label-free measurements of refractive index. Her group (in collaboration with the Department of Urology at the Bnai Zion hospital and Ha'Emek Medical Center) developed a means of rapid antimicrobial susceptibility testing for clinical samples.

=== Porous silicon therapeutics ===
Segal and her research team engineered porous silicon carriers containing nerve growth factor for delivery to the brain in Alzheimer's models, in addition to carriers of anti-cancer drugs to diseased tissue and bone morphogenetic protein 2. She also demonstrated the delivery of anti-cancer drugs captured in silicon microparticles with a pneumatic capillary gene gun. She has studied the kinetics and degradation of porous silicon therapeutics in disease models, finding that porous silicon materials tend to degrade at faster rates in diseased tissue environments compared to healthy tissue.

=== Food packaging technologies ===
Some of Segal's research focuses on development of technologies for active packaging of food usually through the incorporation of polymers, nanomaterials, and essential oils. These materials have antimicrobial properties, allowing them to preserve food for longer times, and reduce food waste.

== Professional activities ==
- 2019: ACS Advances in Measurement Science Lectureship Award for her work on photonic crystal sensing.
- 2019: Lady Globes named her one of Israel's top 50 most influential women.
- 2017: Discovery Award for Team Prismatix (part of UK Longitude Prize Contest) antimicrobial resistance testing technology
- 2016: Hershel Rich Innovation Award
- 2016: Daniel Shiran Memorial Research Prize for outstanding research in biomedicine
- 2015: Yanai Prize for Excellence in Academic Education
- 2014: Henry Taub Award for Academic Excellence

== Entrepreneurship ==
Segal serves as the CTO to BactuSense Technologies Ltd and was the project coordinator of Nanopak, an EU-funded project that developed food packaging products in order to extend the shelf life of food.

== Personal life ==
Segal is a cancer survivor, married, and has two children.
