= Esther Jones =

Esther Jones may refer to:

- Esther Jones (athlete) (born 1969), Olympic gold medal-winning sprinter
- Esther Lee Jones (born c. 1918), singer who performed as Baby Esther
- Esther Jones (singer) (1945–2006), member of the Ikette
- Esther jones(Jupiter deross) (2022) rubberhose cartoon character
