= Ester Vázquez =

Spanish chemist, educator (born 1973)

- Born: Ester Vázquez Fernández-Pacheco; 1973 (age 52–53); Ciudad Real (Spain)
- Education: University of Castilla-La Mancha
- Scientific career
- Fields: Graphene, sustainable chemistry, soft materials
- Workplaces: University of Castilla-La Mancha, University of Zaragoza, Karolinska Institute, University of Trieste
- Thesis: Aplicación de irradiación microondas y catálisis ácida heterogénea en química orgánica medioambiental. Síntesis y reactividad de heterociclos (2000)
- Doctoral advisor: Andrés Moreno Moreno, Antonio de la Hoz Ayuso
- Website: http://www.msocnanochemistrygroup.com/

Ester Vázquez Fernández-Pacheco (born 1973) is a Spanish chemist and expert in carbon nanostructures and sustainable synthesis. She is a full professor at the University of Castilla la Mancha and a group leader at the MSOC Nanochemistry group.

== Biography ==
Ester Vázquez Fernández-Pacheco obtained her PhD degree from the University of Castilla-la Mancha in 2000. Her PhD studies covered the applications of microwave irradiation in catalysis, synthesis, and sustainable chemistry. She also spent a few months at the University of Zaragoza (Spain), where she studied the uses of silica-supported Lewis acids for catalysis; and later at the Karolinska Institute in Stockholm (Sweden), where she worked on the application of microwaves to prepare radiolabelling tracers for positron emission tomography. After finishing her PhD, she carried out her postdoctoral training at the University of Trieste (Italy) working on biological applications of fullerenes and carbon nanotubes in the group of Maurizio Prato. She then returned to her alma mater, where she was promoted to Associate Professor in 2010, and then Full Professor in 2019.

== Research ==
Her current research focuses on the functionalization and purification of carbon nanostructures, including graphene, using green protocols. She has applied innovative methodologies, such as ball-milling, to prepare green graphene by mixing graphite and sugar crystals. Usually, graphene is produced by exfoliating graphite in solvents, but this alternative does not need toxic chemicals, thus facilitating new biomedical and agricultural applications for graphene. Her research group is currently collaborating with multinational manufacturers such as Grupo Antolin to scale up the production of green graphene with mechanochemical methods.

Interested in medical technologies, Vázquez recently shifted her focus towards soft materials for artificial tissues, some of which showcase self-healing properties. She is also studying the possibilities of carbon-based materials and soft-materials to build robots that respond to external stimuli such as changes in concentration or electric fields. These robots could find applications in assisted industrial manipulation, rehabilitation, and medical technologies.

Furthermore, Ester Vázquez is part of the Graphene Flagship, one of the largest research projects ever funded by the European Commission. She is an active member of the Work Package for Health and Environment since the beginning of the project in 2013. Within this group of researchers, she studies the toxicity and potential harmful effects of graphene and two-dimensional materials, evaluating the effects on skin irritation, communication between cells, and oral ingestion, among others. Moreover, she co-authoured a safety-assessment study of the impact of graphene and related materials in both human health and the environment. The paper, which reviewed the interactions between graphene with key organs and organisms, including bacteria, algae, plants, invertebrates, and vertebrates in various ecosystems, concluded graphene and graphene-based materials are less toxic than carbon nanotubes. Her research also shows that human white cells can biodegrade single and few-layer graphene thanks to myeloperoxidase enzymes.

She has published over 150 peer-reviewed scientific papers and co-authored 5 patents.

== Awards ==
In 2009, Ester Vázquez received the Prize «Ibn Wafid de Toledo» for young researchers, awarded by the Government of Castilla-La Mancha (Spain).
