= Herbsheim =

Herbsheim Herbse
- Commune
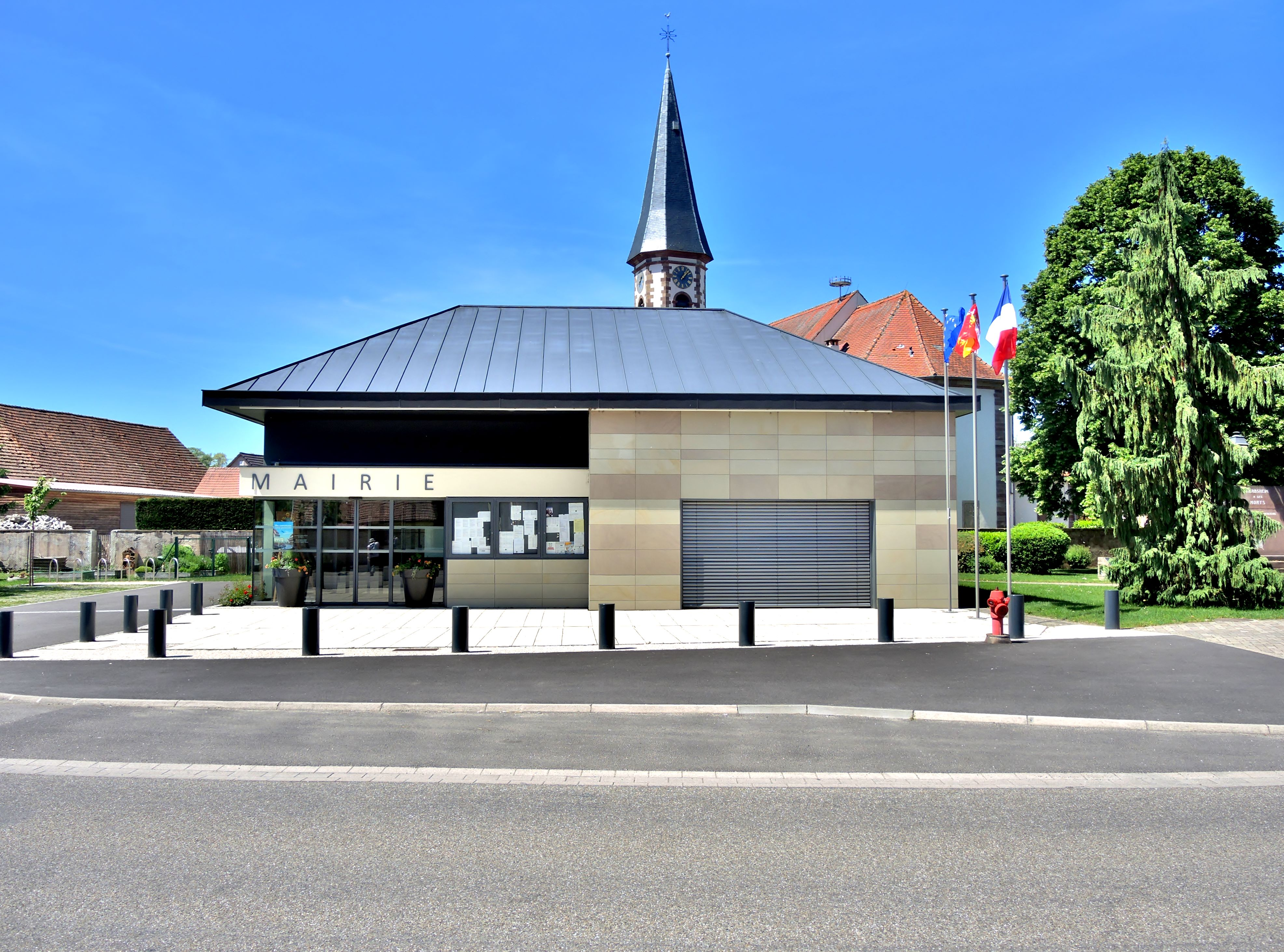
- The town hall in Herbsheim

- Coat of arms
- Location of Herbsheim
- Location within France Location within Grand Est
- Coordinates: 48°21′02″N 7°37′56″E
- Country: France
- Region: Grand Est
- Department: Bas-Rhin
- Arrondissement: Sélestat-Erstein
- Canton: Erstein
- Intercommunality: CC Canton d'Erstein

Government
  - Mayor (2020–2026): Stanis Ekman
- Area^{1}: 8.6 km^{2} (3.3 sq mi)
- Highest elevation: 160 m (520 ft)
- Lowest elevation: 155 m (509 ft)
- Population (2023): 963
  - Density: 110/km^{2} (290/sq mi)
- Time zone: UTC+01:00 (CET)
  - Summer (DST): UTC+02:00 (CEST)
- INSEE/Postal code: 67192 /67230
- ^{1} French Land Register data, which excludes lakes, ponds, glaciers > 1 km^{2} (0.386 sq mi or 247 acres) and river estuaries.

Herbsheim is a commune in the Bas-Rhin department in Grand Est in north-eastern France.

== Geography ==
The village is positioned to the north-east of Sélestat on the strip of rich alluvial farm land between the main north-south routes and the river Rhine. The village's main street is part of the departmental route D5 which connects Benfeld with the riverbank and the ferry crossing into Germany at Rhinau.

== See also ==
- Communes of the Bas-Rhin department
