= Lambrey =

- Commune
- Coat of arms
- Location of Lambrey
- Location within France Location within Bourgogne-Franche-Comté
- Coordinates: 47°45′52″N 5°55′42″E
- Country: France
- Region: Bourgogne-Franche-Comté
- Department: Haute-Saône
- Arrondissement: Vesoul
- Canton: Jussey

Government
  - Mayor (2020–2026): Michel Dubois
- Area^{1}: 6.08 km^{2} (2.35 sq mi)
- Highest elevation: 295 m (968 ft)
- Lowest elevation: 228 m (748 ft)
- Population (2023): 68
  - Density: 11/km^{2} (29/sq mi)
- Time zone: UTC+01:00 (CET)
  - Summer (DST): UTC+02:00 (CEST)
- INSEE/Postal code: 70293 /70500
- ^{1} French Land Register data, which excludes lakes, ponds, glaciers > 1 km^{2} (0.386 sq mi or 247 acres) and river estuaries.

Lambrey (French pronunciation: [lɑ̃bʁɛ]) is a commune in the Haute-Saône department in the region of Bourgogne-Franche-Comté in eastern France. Its geographical coordinates are 47° 46' 0" North, 5° 56' 0".

== See also ==
- Communes of the Haute-Saône department
