= David Okello =

Kenyan footballer

Personal information
- Full name: David Abong'o Okello
- Date of birth: 19 September 1986 (age 40)
- Place of birth: Nairobi, Kenya
- Height: 1.68 m (5 ft 6 in)
- Position: Goalkeeper

Team information
- Current team: Tusker

Senior career*
Years	Team	Apps	(Gls)
2006–2011	Thika United		
2012–2015	Sofapaka		
2016–	Tusker		

International career^{‡}
2007–	Kenya	6	(0)
- * Club domestic league appearances and goals as of 19:34, 27 April 2017 (UTC) ‡ National team caps and goals as of 19:34, 27 April 2017 (UTC)

David Abong'o Okello (born 19 September 1986) is a Kenyan international footballer who plays for Tusker as a goalkeeper.

== Career ==
Born in Nairobi, Okello has played club football for Thika United, Sofapaka and Tusker.

He made his international debut for Kenya in 2007.
