= Comandanta Esther =

Mexican tzeltal revolutionary

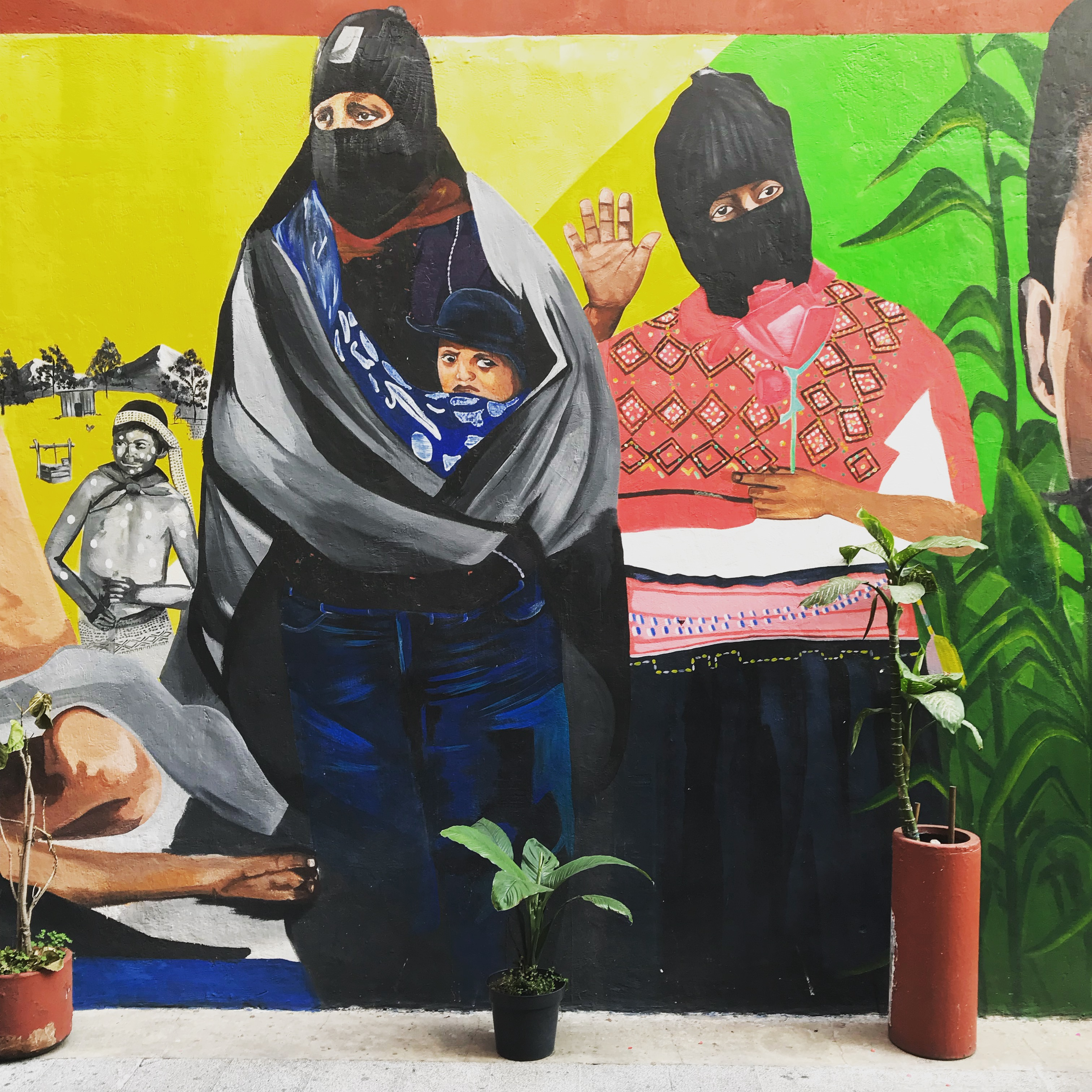
Zapatistas depicted in a mural.

Comandanta Esther is the nom de guerre of a revolutionary in the Zapatista Army of National Liberation (EZLN) of Chiapas, Mexico, created for indigenous people's rights. She is considered a high ranking woman in the EZLN. Military "commanders" have no actual military or governmental power and are simply spokespeople for the movement. Comandanta Esther is best known for her March 2001 speech to the Congress of the Union at the San Lazaro Legislative Palace in Mexico City, in which she spoke for constitutional recognition of indigenous people and the difficulty that indigenous women face in Mexico, demanded that their rights be acknowledged. Her work has helped inspire women activists to speak up in and join leadership roles in their communities in Mexico.

== Biography ==
Comandanta Esther endured a difficult childhood as her family suffered from poverty and hunger. She lived with her mother and several siblings, four of whom died from lack of food or from illness. They did not have enough money; they ate tortillas and occasionally beans. Additionally, Esther did not know how to speak Spanish. She had gone to school as a child, but she did not learn because she did not understand the language. In her words, she learned how to speak and write in Spanish upon joining EZLN.

Later, as Esther grew up and started to become aware of the poverty around her, she began to attend indigenous meetings where they talked about the state of their community. She gradually started increasing her political participation, but was not met without obstacles due to being an indigenous woman living in a region where inequality is common.

== Political participation ==
EZLN flag

Comandanta Esther became known for her role as the spokesperson relaying the official message from the Clandestine Revolutionary Indigenous Committee (CCRI) of the Zapatista Army of National Liberation in the Congress of the Union, located in the Legislative Palace of San Lázaro on March 28, 2001. Her position as an EZLN representative brought much attention to the speech because up until that point, Subcomandante Marcos had been the only and main spokesperson that represented the organization.

Her speech was broadcast live on all Mexican television channels and was additionally published on March 29 under the Profile segment of La Jornada, a Mexican newspaper. The published piece reported that the Commission for Concord and Pacification (Cocopa) needed to recognize the need for indigenous rights, especially rights for indigenous women, since their demographic faced much more gendered targeted violence, have less reproductive and health rights along with employment opportunities and freedom of expression.

In her Congress of the Union speech she is recorded saying, "That is how we Zapatistas want Mexico to be. One where indigenous people will be indigenous and Mexican, one where respect for difference is balanced with respect for what makes us equals. One where difference is not a reason for death, jail, persecution, mockery, humiliation, racism. On where, always, formed by differences, ours is a sovereign and independent nation." which ultimately summed up the sentiment of the EZLN at the time.

Although Comandanta Esther's involvement in the March 28, 2001, speech to the Congress of the Union is the most well-known speech, she is also recognized for her work as a speaker during International Women’s Day in Chiapas on March 8 of the same year. She presented the need of women solidarity and unity:

“To women throughout the country, we tell them to fight together. We have to fight more because as indigenous we are triply despised. As an indigenous woman, as a woman and as a poor woman. But women who are not indigenous also suffer, that is why we are going to invite them all to fight so that we no longer suffer. It is not true that women do not know, that nothing else is useful to be at home, that not only happens in indigenous communities but also in cities."

Additionally, she also recounted the difficulties that she and other women have had in order to participants in politics:

"At first, it was really difficult for me, the men did not understand, although I always explained to them that it is necessary to fight so that we are not all the time starving. Men did not suit them, they say women were only good for having children and they should take care…”

Comandanta Esther also participated as a speaker in following events during the year 2001:

- Juchitán, Oaxaca, February 25
- Nurio, Michoacán, March 3
- Toluca, State of Mexico, March 5
- Zócalo of Mexico City, March 11
- National Polytechnic Institute (IPN), March 16
- National School of Anthropology and History (ENAH), March 18
- San Andrés Totoltepec and Santo Tomás Ajusco, March 19
- UAM Azcapotzalco, March 20

And in 2003, in Oventic, Chiapas, on August 9.

In most of her speeches, Comandanta Esther highlights the importance of the unity between indigenous and non-indigenous individuals, and between men and women, in the search for a better country:

"It is our word as a woman, let's walk together with men. Just They will not be able and we alone cannot. Let us put more effort, consolidate our social fighting organization. Let us all fight together, men and women, for the rights that the powerful deny us and build a Mexico where there is no racial mockery, color and tongue. Brothers and sisters, let us not loosen our conscience, we are very important because without women there would not be a country nor would humanity multiply. We as women feel the pain, we give birth and we are a foot of the men, only men fighting will not make the change. "

During the Fiesta de los Caracoles in Oventic, Chiapas, in 2003, Comandanta Esther harshly criticized political parties, pointing out that they did not represent Mexicans. "We cannot stop being Indians to be recognized as Mexicans. Never again. They will be able to finish us or betray us (referring to the PRI, PAN and PRD) ... they agreed to deny us our rights. "

The activist also wrote a letter on January 1, 2003, addressed to the President of the Republic at that time, Vicente Fox Quesada, and Luis H. Alvarez, Commissioner for the Development of Indigenous Peoples, to demand that they acknowledge indigenous peoples and their demands instead of not fulfilling the promises they had made, telling them, among other things: "It is you commissioner of peace. And you are only a commissioner of Fox to provoke division, and deceive the people of Mexico."
