= Esther Montelius =

Swedish author (1871–1948)

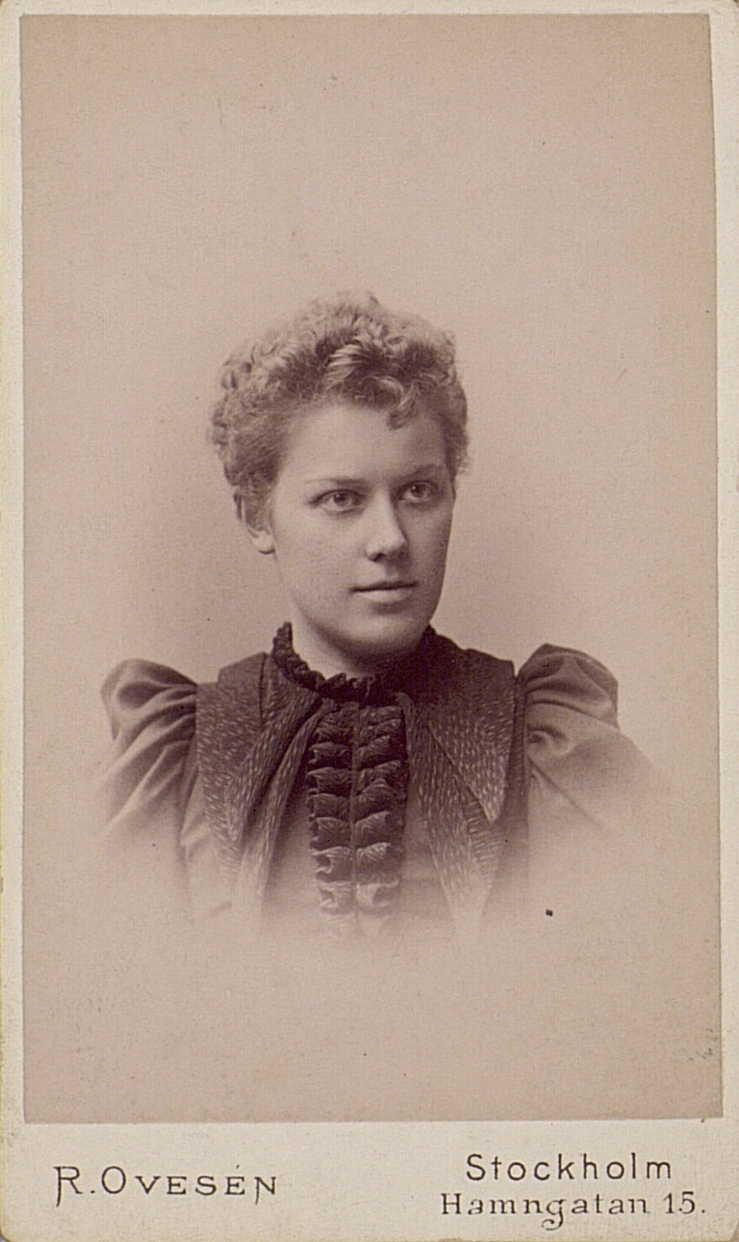
- Born: Esther Maria Elisabeth Montelius; 4 May 1871
- Died: 12 December 1948 (aged 77)
- Citizenship: Swedish
- Occupation: Author

Esther Montelius born 4 May 1871, died 12 December 1948, was a Swedish writer who was employed as a telegraph clerk at Stockholm Telegraph Station's branch at Södermalmstorg 26.

== Biography ==
Montelius was born on 4 May 1871, as the daughter of the mill owner G. G. D. Montelius, and Margaretha Christina Segerberg. Her first book, Adolfsfors, is a sentimental and romanticized description of Adolfsfors' mill in Värmland. The work was published in several editions during the 1920s. Parts of it may have been co-written with Frida Åslund. Montelius is buried at Norra begravningsplatsen in Stockholm.

== Works ==
- Adolfsfors. An old Värmland farm and its mill patrons. Romanticized depiction., Åhlén & Åkerlunds förlag, 1920
- The legacy: an old family history from the shores of Lac Léman, Åhlén & Åkerlund's publisher, 1926
