= Esther Griffin White =

American journalist and politician (1869–1954)

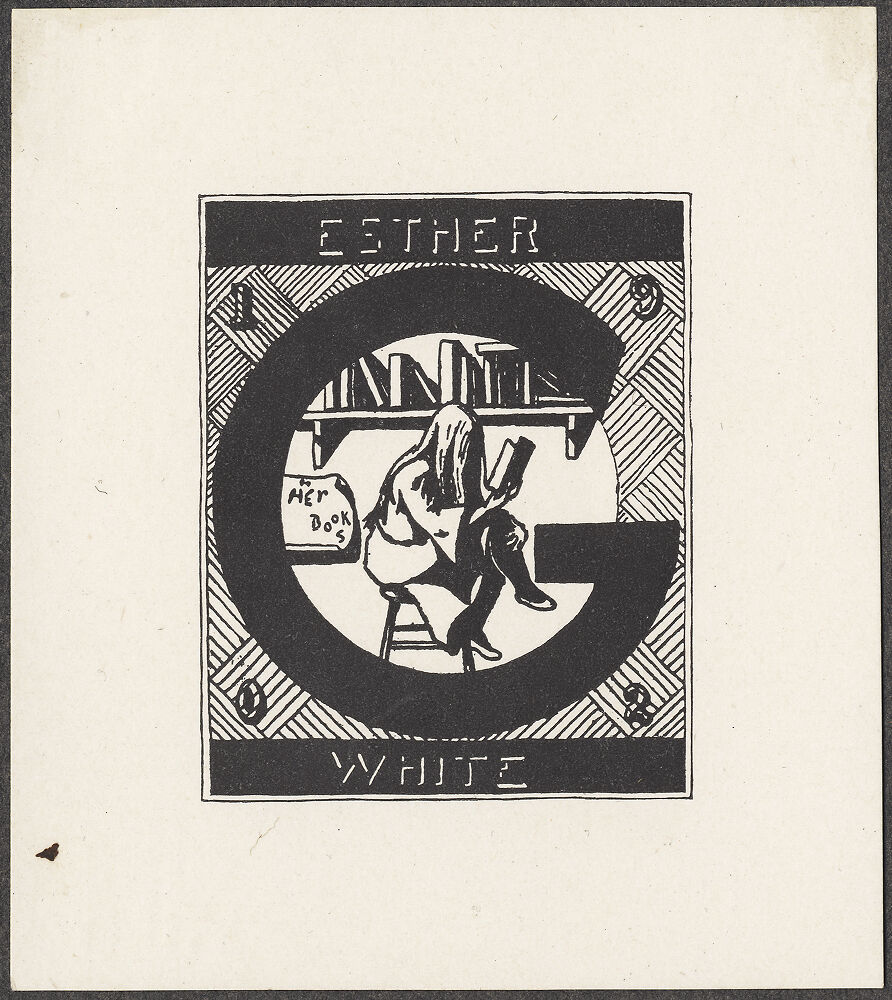
- Bookplate of Esther Griffin White designed by her brother, Raymond White.
- Born: 1869; Richmond, Indiana
- Died: 1954 (aged 84–85)
- Resting place: Earlham Cemetery
- Education: Earlham College
- Known for: Journalism & Women's rights activism

Esther Griffin White (1869–1954), was an American journalist, poet, politician, and women's rights activist. She was an active members of the women's suffrage movement and in 1920 became the first woman in Indiana to have her name on a state election ballot. White was also the first woman in Indiana to campaign for a seat in the United States House of Representatives.

== Early life and education ==
White was born in Richmond, Indiana in 1869. Her parents, Oliver White and Mary Caroline Cottom, were Quakers, and her father was a teacher. As a teenager, White attended classes at Earlham College, but never completed her degree.

== Career ==
=== Journalism ===
Throughout her lifetime, White worked as a journalist for several Richmond newspapers including the Richmond Morning News and the Palladium-Item, and was a member of the Indiana Women's Press Club. White also founded her own newspaper, which she titled The Little Paper. The paper was reportedly written and published entirely by White.

Articles by White were published in magazines such as House Beautiful, American Art News, Woman's Home Companion, and Brush and Pencil.

She also published under pseudonyms such as "Z" and "Graveyard Ripplings" in both Chicago and Atlanta papers.

=== Activism ===
White was a vocal advocate for women's suffrage. She was a member of several suffragist organizations, including the Richmond Franchise League, the Woman's Franchise League of Indiana (the local affiliate of the National American Woman Suffrage Association).

White was also a strong advocate for racial equality, and was an active member of the Richmond Branch of the National Association for the Advancement of Colored People (NAACP).

=== Politics ===
In 1912, White voiced her support for Theodore Roosevelt's presidential campaign.

In 1920, before the passage of the 19th amendment recognized women's right to vote in the United States, White campaigned to become a Delegate to the Republican State Convention, making her the first woman in Indiana to have her name appear on a state election ballot. White was elected to the office and served as the only female delegate at the convention.

Later, White ran for both mayoral and congressional office, though she was not elected to either post.

=== Poetry and art ===
In addition to being a journalist and activist, White was also a poet and a patron of the arts. Her collection of paintings by Indiana artists was donated to Earlham College.

White published four books of poetry as well as a volume on bookplates from Indiana titled Indiana Bookplates (1910). These books were titled In the Orchestra, In the Garden, Poems about Richmond, and Passion’s Jewels. She was considered an authority in the field of bookplates.

She also published Louise Vickroy Boyd's poems and titled it Poems by Louise Vickroy Boyd.

Griffen White travelled to experience and write about different museums, orchestras, and other artistic events, which Richmond, Indiana rarely experienced. She also brought multiple visiting artists to present within Richmond. Through this, she made a bit of a profit.

She is noted to have been friends with Paul Laurence Dunbar and exchanged letters with him often.

== Death and legacy ==
White died in 1954 and was buried in the Earlham Cemetery in Richmond.

In 1992, White was inducted into the Indiana Journalism Hall of Fame at DePauw University.
