= State papers =

Term in the British Isles for government records

The term state papers is used in Britain and Ireland to refer to government archives and records. Such papers used to be kept separate from non-governmental papers, with state papers kept in the State Paper Office and general public records kept in the Public Record Office. When they were written, they were regarded as the personal papers of the government officials writing them, but in 1702, the State Papers Office was established and requisitioned them.

== Ireland ==
In Ireland, these records were held in a single repository, the Public Record Office. In 1922, this was in two locations, the Bermingham Tower of Dublin Castle and the Four Courts on Dublin's quays. However, the vast majority of records, particularly before 1790, were held in the Four Courts. When the Four Courts was occupied by anti-Treaty forces of the Irish Republican Army in April 1922, the pro-Treaty forces came under pressure to remove them. Following the assassination of the British Field Marshal, Henry Hughes Wilson by anti-Treaty forces on 22 June, the British government pressed the Provisional Government to take action or else British forces, still occupying Ireland, would intervene. On 27 June, Michael Collins, leader of the pro-Treaty IRA, gave the order to attack the occupying force in what is widely regarded as the opening shot of the Irish Civil War. In the process, whether by external artillery or internal sabotage, most of these records were destroyed.

The Irish State Paper Office contains papers from the offices of:

- President of Ireland
- Taoiseach
- Oireachtas, i.e. Dáil Éireann and Seanad Éireann
- Departments of State

There are papers also from former offices of state, including:

- King of Ireland
- Monarch of the United Kingdom of Great Britain and Ireland relating to Ireland
- Lord Lieutenant of Ireland
- Chief Secretary for Ireland
- Under Secretary for Ireland
- Irish House of Commons & Irish House of Lords
- House of Commons of Southern Ireland
- Attorney-General for Ireland
- Governor-General of the Irish Free State

The Irish State Paper Office was formerly located in Dublin Castle, while the Irish Public Records Office was located at the Four Courts. In the late 1980s the distinction was abolished and both archives merged and moved to a new National Archives of Ireland in Bishop Street in Dublin.

== United Kingdom ==
The National Archives of the United Kingdom is located in Kew, near London. The Royal Archives are kept separately at Windsor Castle.

There are separate national archives for Scotland (the National Records of Scotland) and Northern Ireland (the Public Record Office of Northern Ireland).

== See also ==
- Thirty Year Rule
