= Esther Smith (singer) =

Ghanaian gospel musician

Esther Smith is a Ghanaian gospel musician. She was born in Kumasi, Suame, Ghana in the early 70s. Esther joined the Tesano Methodist church choir at the age of 14-years-old and grew into music scene at the church.

After her secondary education, she attended Garden City Computer Training and Typing School and the School of Languages both in Kumasi, Ghana. She again joined a singing group set up by Kapital Radio a private radio station in Kumasi.

She won the award for the Gospel Album of the Year, Gospel Artiste of the Year and Best Female Vocal Performance of the Year in 2003 at the Ghana Music Awards.

== Award ==
- She won the Ghana Music Award for Gospel Album of the Year in 2003.
- Ghana Music Award, Gospel Artiste of the Year 2003.
- Ghana Music Award, Best Female Vocal Performance of the Year 2003.
- Ghana Music Award, Best Gospel Album of the Year 2005.
- Best Song of the Year in 2005, Ghana Music Award.
- Best Album of the Year at the 2005 Ghana Music Award.

== Concepts and Shows ==
=== Accra and Kumasi 2024 ===
On August 12, 2024, Ghanaian gospel artist Esther Smith arrived at Accra International Airport, marking the start of a brief regional tour during which she performed in Kumasi and Accra.

The tour included concerts on August 25 at Bantama Pentecost in Kumasi and August 30 at the Perez Dome in Accra. The Accra concert, held at Perez Dome, Dzorwulu, featured songs spanning Esther’s music career, including her classic hits, her new releases, and other worship music.

In an interview on Channel One TV's Breakfast Daily, Esther shared her deep passion for worship and its profound impact.

== Controversies ==
=== Chef Smith ===
In an interview on Accra-based OKAY FM, Esther Smith, the Ghanaian gospel musician, clarified that she is not related to Chef Smith, the Millennium Chef. She explained, “I’m not related to Chef Smith in any way. I don’t know him at all. My father is Smith from Cape Coast, and my mother is from Akomadan. I consider myself Ashanti because of my mother.”

=== Legal dispute with OFM Computer World ===
In February 2025, Smith found herself at the center of a legal dispute with OFM Computer World Europe.

OFM Computer World claims that Smith owes them a sum of $240,000, representing a 40% share of total revenues from digital stores and control over her music rights and platforms. The claim arises because OFM established Smith's YouTube channel to promote her gospel music career, and anticipated sharing in the revenues from that channel. The company said a legally binding agreement was signed by Esther Smith on June 16, 2020, which recognized the OFM Computer World as the rightful creator and manager of the channel, as well as entrusting it with the technical and promotional management. OFM claims they have not received the revenue shares from this arrangement.

Initially, Smith refuted the allegations by OFM, and both parties' lawyers are working closely on the matter.
