= Esther Lekain =

Belgian singer (1870–1960)

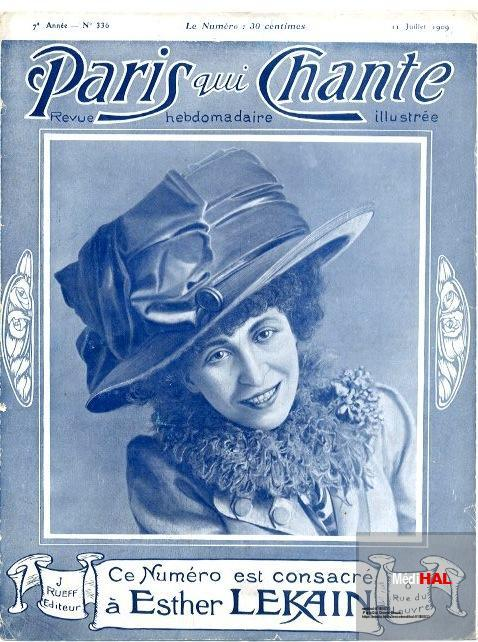
- Born: Ernestine Niekiel; 1 April 1870; Paris, France
- Died: 2 March 1960 (aged 89); Nice, France
- Occupation: singer

Esther Lekain, née Ernestine Nickel (1 April 1870 – 2 March 1960), was a French singer. She was born in Paris and her career spanned 70 years. She died in Nice.

== Recordings ==
1. La dernière Gavotte (Vargues – Delormel)
2. Un vieux farceur (Léon – Nadot)
3. Les vieilles larmes (Millandy)
4. Ah ! Si vous voulez d'l'amour (Scotto – Burtey)
5. Le cœur de Ninon (Buccucci – Bereta – Millandy)
6. [Tout] Ça ne vaut pas l'amour (Perpignan – Trebitsch)
