= Esther Stace =

Australian equestrian (1871/1872–1918)

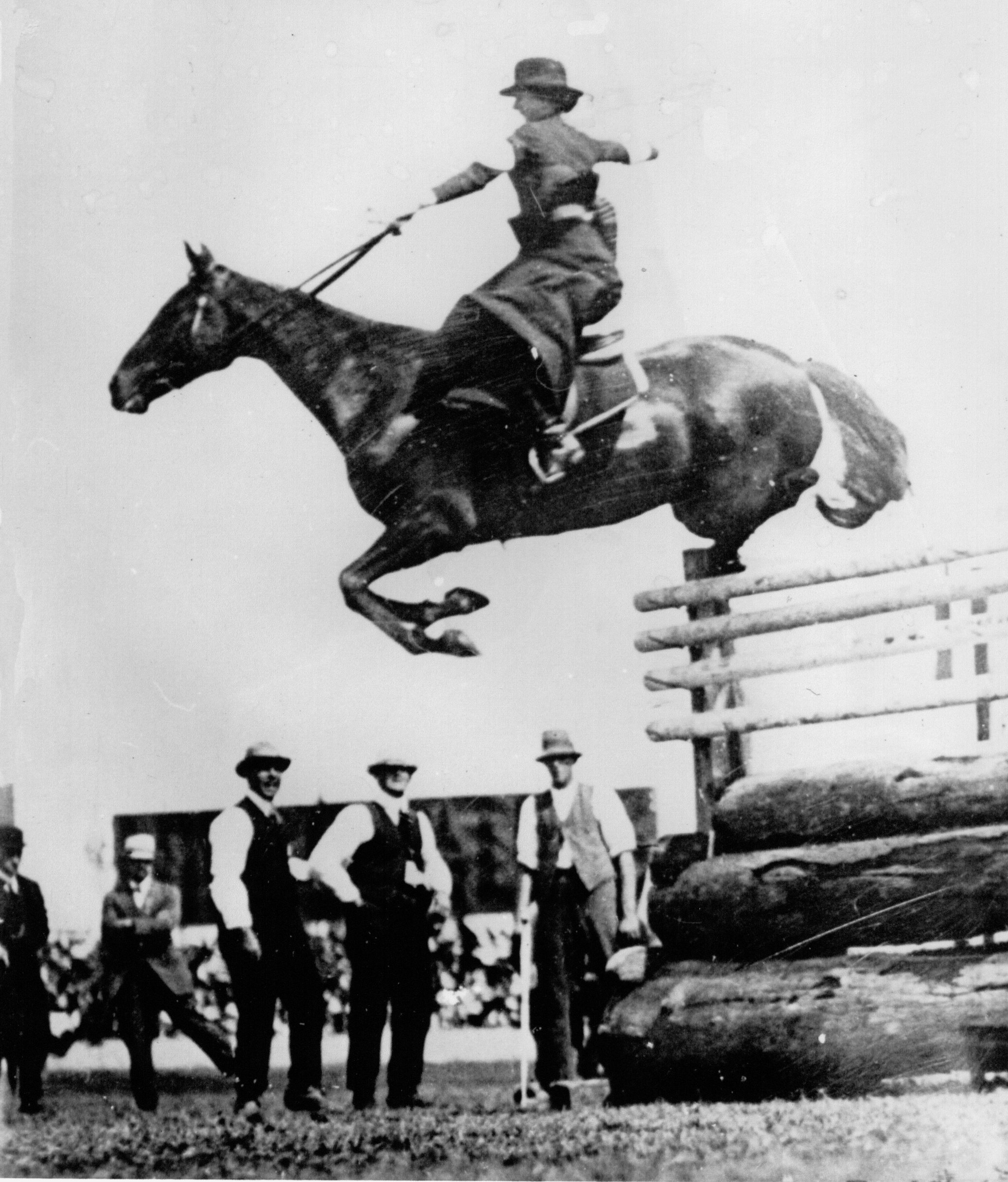
- Stace's record 6 foot 6 inch jump at the Sydney Royal Easter Show in 1915
- Born: Esther Munford; 1871 or 1872; Port Macquarie, New South Wales
- Died: 20 July 1918 (aged 46)
- Occupation: Equestrian
- Spouse: William H. Stace (1886)
- Children: 3

Esther Martha Stace (1871/1872 – 20 July 1918) was an Australian equestrian. She first competed in an event in Walcha in 1891 at the age of 20, where she tied for first place. She continued to compete until within a few years of her death in 1918. She always rode sidesaddle, and wore a scarlet plush outfit in competitions. In 1915 she set a sidesaddle high jump record of 1.98 metres (6 feet 6 inches) which would stand for 98 years, until 2013.
