= Ester Ringnér-Lundgren =

Swedish writer (1907–1993)

- Born: 4 October 1907; Norrköping, Sweden
- Died: 26 July 1993 (aged 85)
- Occupations: writer, schoolteacher
- Writing career
- Language: Swedish
- Genres: children's literature

Ester Ringnér-Lundgren (4 October 1907, in Norrköping – 26 July 1993) was a Swedish writer who wrote books for children and youth. A few of her books were published in Great Britain.

== Biography ==
Ester Maria Ringnér grew up on Tunnbindaregatan in Norrköping and was the daughter of Johanna and Birger Ringnér. She attended the primary school in Saltängen for two years and then eight years at the Northern Girls' School in Norrköping. Already at the age of twelve, she decided to become a writer.

== Publications ==
- Little Trulsa
- Little Trulsa's teaparty
- Little Trulsa's secret
- Little Trulsa's birthday
