= Alice Eversman =

American opera singer (1885–1974)

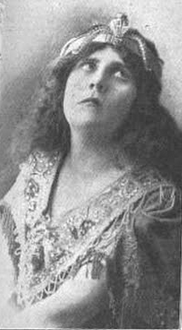
Alice Eversman, from a 1917 publication.

Alice Eversman (September 4, 1885 — February 1, 1974) was an American operatic soprano and voice teacher, and later a music critic for over twenty years.

== Early life ==
Alice Mary Eversman was born in Effingham, Illinois and raised in Washington, D.C., the daughter of John Eversman Sr. and Frances Caroline Gibbons Eversman. Encouraged by organist John W. Bischoff, she studied music at the Peabody Conservatory in Baltimore, Maryland, and in Karlsruhe, Germany.

== Career ==
Eversman sang soprano with the Chicago Grand Opera Company. With them, she appeared in a New Year's Day show at the county jail, and "brought tears to the eyes of many prisoners" with her songs. She was a member of the Metropolitan Opera Company for the 1916-1917 season. She was a fortunate understudy on at least two occasions: once in 1912, when Carmen Melis failed to appear for her starring role in Aida, and again as Aida in 1915, when Ester Adaberto was called to Italy on a family emergency. She starred in Aida again in 1917, in a stadium performance to benefit the Civilian Relief Committee during World War I. She also gave recitals on the Chautauqua circuit, with violinist Elena de Sayn.

Eversman wrote music criticism for The Washington Star newspaper from 1932 to 1953. She was also a music critic for the Paris edition of the New York Herald. In her work as a critic, she reviewed the president's daughter, Margaret Truman, on her singing tour in 1949, and described a 1933 recital at a church auditorium by Marian Anderson, lamenting that "her extraordinary singing was enjoyed only by a small audience." She also reviewed the 1943 production of La Traviata by the National Negro Opera Company, with particular praise for Lillian Evanti. She was president of the American Newspaper Women's Club three times, and a member of the Women's National Press Club.

== Personal life ==
Eversman died from a stroke in 1974, aged 88 years, in Fairfax, Virginia. In 2012 her cousin Mary Ellen Eversman published a biography, Alice Eversman: Dramatic Opera Soprano, and gave lectures on the subject.
