= Esther Nakaziba =

Ugandan makeup artist (born 1995)

- Born: Nakaziba; Katwe-Kampala
- Other name: Esther
- Education: Makerere University Gangu preparatory primary school
- Occupation: make up artist
- Employer: Self employed
- Known for: Best effect make up artist in Uganda
- Awards: Prestige awards Ikon Awards
- Honours: Bachelors Degree in industrial fine art

Esther Nakaziba (born in 1995) is a Ugandan makeup artist. In 2024, she won the best film make-up artist award in a TV series known as Prestige. In March 2024, she organized an E-Nakaziba film and makeup exhibition. In 2023, she was nominated as the best makeup and hair personnel of the year.

== Background and education ==
Nakaziba was born in Katwe and raised in Gangu, Kampala-Uganda.She went to Gangu primary school for her primary level. She graduated with a bachelor’s degree in industrial fine art and design at Makerere University, majoring in fashion and design.

== Career ==
Nakaziba's career as a costume designer started at Gazaland with a sewing machine, a graduation gift from her father from where she became a costume designer for movies after graduation. She creates fake wounds, bruises, swollen faces, rotten skin that are required by film producers.

== Awards ==
- Best film makeup artist in the TT series Prestige in 2025.
- Best costume designer in Janzi awards in 2022.

== Nominations ==
- Ikon awards
- Janzi awards
- 2024 STAR meter Award

== Projects ==
- The Honorables
- Bakayimbira Drama actors

== See also ==
- Mariam Ndagire
