= Ester Barinaga =

Danish academic (born 1972)

Ester Barinaga (born 1972) is a professor of social entrepreneurship at Lund University Sweden. She works primarily in the areas of social innovation and social entrepreneurship, with a particular emphasis on those initiatives aiming to build more inclusive and sustainable cities from the grassroots as well as from municipalities.

== Personal life and education ==
Barinaga was born in Spain, naturalized Swedish in 2004 and currently lives in Malmö, Sweden. She received a Master in business administration (MBA) in 1995 and a master's degree in international management (1996) from ESADE Business School in Barcelona. From 1998 to 2002, Barinaga conducted her Ph.D studies in business administration at the Stockholm School of Economics (HHS). Her doctoral thesis was an ethnographic-inspired study of an international project group. Her doctoral thesis was awarded a three years post-doctoral scholarship from the Jan Wallanders and Tom Hedelius Foundation. The title of her Ph.D thesis was “Levelling vagueness: A study of cultural diversity in an international project group”.

== Career ==
Between 2002 and 2006 Barinaga worked at the Royal Institute of Technology in Stockholm where she conducted an ethnographic study of the digital divide as it plays out in the Kista science region. She published her findings in the book “Powerful dichotomies: Inclusion and exclusion in the information society” (2010).

Barinaga was a visiting scholar at the Graduate School of Management at University of Queensland, Brisbane in 2000, as well as at the Scandinavian Center for Organizational Research (SCANCOR) at Stanford University for 1,5 years from 2007 to 2008.

In 2009, Barinaga became associate professor at Copenhagen Business School in the department of management, politics and philosophy, becoming professor (with special responsibilities) in 2013. In 2019, she moved to Lund University School of Economics and Management for a professorship of social innovation and entrepreneurship.

Since 2016, when Barinaga first encountered a complementary currency in Málaga, Spain, her work has focused on complementary and community currencies as tools for local socio-economic empowerment. She explores how citizen-driven and municipality-driven local monies can foster more resilient, inclusive and sustainable communities. Barinaga's research on complementary currencies challenges the notion of money as a neutral medium, instead framing it as a socio-technical infrastructure that actively shapes individual behaviour as well as community dynamics. She argues that, since money is designed, it can—and must—be redesigned and reorganised to foster more environmentally sustainable and inclusive cities. Through her work, Barinaga demonstrates that complementary currencies not only introduce innovative monetary designs but also pioneer new forms of democratic governance of money, serving as small-scale laboratories for rethinking economic organization. These initiatives offer practical insights into how communities can collectively design and govern financial systems that prioritize care, resilience, and local empowerment.

== Förorten i Centrum ==
Barinaga founded the non-profit organization Förorten i Centrum in 2010. It was an initiative that uses the collective production of public art to change the stigmatized images of the so-called “immigrant suburbs” of Stockholm. The initiative coordinated the production of murals in various Swedish cities – such as Stockholm, Landskrona, Kalmar, Örebro. Förorten i Centrum closed down in 2020. Her current work focuses on community currencies as a method to build more resilient communities and more inclusive cities.

== Selected publications ==
=== Books ===
- Barinaga, E. 2024. Remaking Money for a Sustainable Future (2024) Pub. Bristol University Press. Here.
- Barinaga, E. 2014. Social Entrepreneurship: Cases and Concepts. Studentlitteratur.
- Barinaga, E. 2010. Powerful dichotomies: Inclusion and exclusion in the information society (2010) Pub. EFI

=== Articles ===
- Barinaga, E. 2007. ’Cultural diversity’ at work: ‘National culture’ as a discourse organizing an international project group. Human Relations, 60 (2): 315–340.
- Barinaga, E. 2013. The Psychic Life of Resistance: The Ethnic Subject in a High-Tech Region. Ethnicities, 13(5):625–644.
- Barinaga, E. 2013. Politicising Social Entrepreneurship: Three Social Entrepreneurial Rationalities towards Social Change. Journal of Social Entrepreneurship, 4(3): 347–372.
- Barinaga, E. 2014. Micro-finance in a developed welfare state: A hybrid technology for the government of the outcast. Geoforum, 51:27–36.
- Barinaga, E. 2020. Coopted! Mission-drift in a social entrepreneurial initiative engaged in a cross-sectoral partnership. VOLUNTAS: International Journal of Voluntary and Nonprofit Organizations, 31(2), 437-449
- Barinaga, E. 2020. A route to commons-based democratic monies? Embedding the production of money in traditional communal institutions. Frontiers in Blockchain. Here.
- Barinaga, E. Diniz, E. & Ocampo, J. 2026. Digital municipal currencies as a New Municipalist instrument for trans-local transformation: The case of the State of Rio de Janeiro. Urban Studies, 63(6)1156-1177. Here.
- Barinaga, E. 2025. The shock of the old: How a local currency’s transition from digital to paper deepened monetary conscientization. CSIC: ARBOR., 201(813):2895. Here.
- Barinaga, E. & Zapata Campos, M.J. 2024. Tinkering with malleable grassroots infrastructures: Kenyan local currencies in informal settlements. Urban Geography, 45(5):798-817. Here.
- Kiaka, R., Oloko, M., Ocampo, J. & Barinaga, E. 2024. ‘Gaming the system’: How communities strategize around currencies, convertibility and cash transfers in Kenya. European Journal of Social Sciences, 9(6):35-57. Here.
- Barinaga, E. 2026. From Evaluation to Valorising: Three moments in the making of social impact value. Journal of Social Entrepreneurship, 17(1):28-52. Here.
