= Esther Soyannwo =

Nigerian teacher and politician

Esther Oladunni Soyannwo (née Ososami) was a Nigerian teacher and politician. In 1964 she was the first woman elected to the House of Representatives, but was unable to take her seat.

== Biography ==
Soyannwo was educated at CMS Girls School Lagos and worked as a teacher. A mother of six, she entered politics in the 1950s, joining the Action Group and becoming an activist for its women's section in 1953. She was elected to Ijebu South district council, and was later the Action Group's only female candidate in 1964 parliamentary elections. Her campaign was funded by her brother, a wealthy businessman in Ijebu, who gave her £2,000. Her campaign was also assisted by the Ijebu Women's Association. She defeated her Nigerian National Democratic Party opponent Sanya Onabamiro by 18,232 votes to 2,149, one of the new Action Group candidates to win in Western Region. However, her election led to violence and the party advised her it would be too dangerous to take her seat.
