= Esther Kenworthy Waterhouse =

British artist (1857–1944)

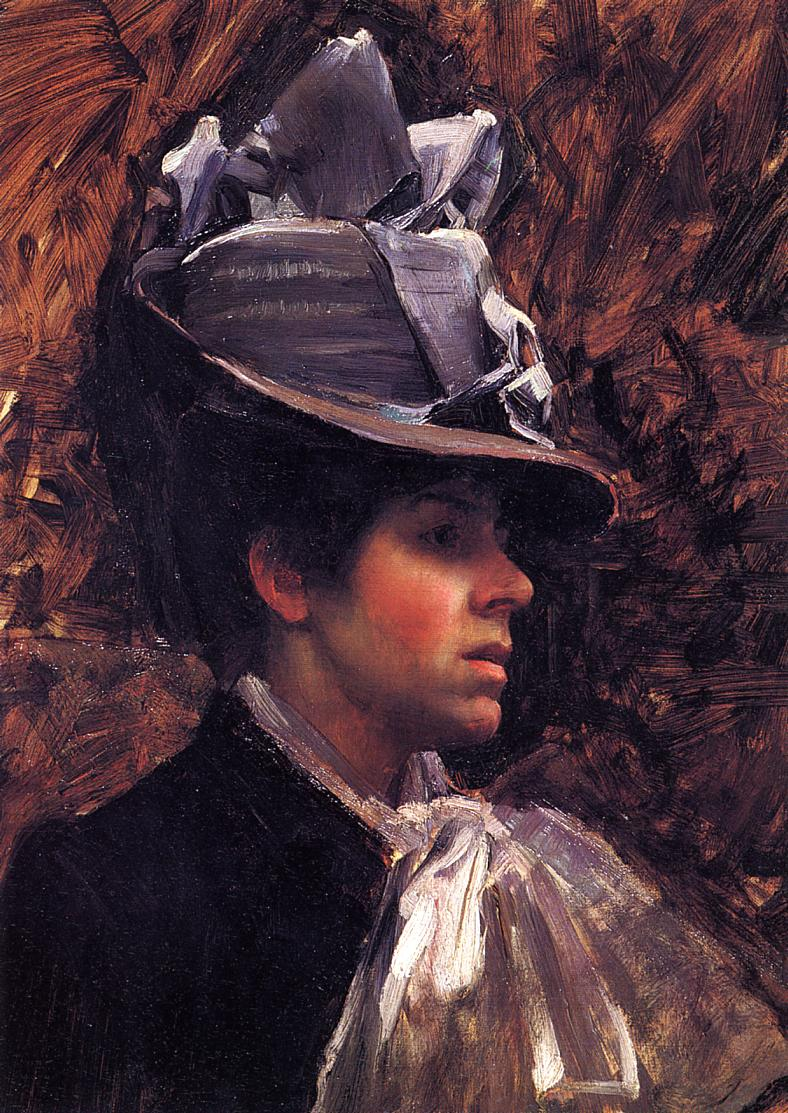
- Portrait of the Artist's Wife (John William Waterhouse, 1885 circa)
- Born: Esther Maria Kenworthy; 1857
- Died: 1944 (aged 86–87)
- Known for: Painting
- Spouse: John William Waterhouse (m. 1883)

Esther Kenworthy Waterhouse (1857–1944), born Esther Maria Kenworthy, was a British artist who exhibited her flower-paintings at the Royal Academy in London and elsewhere.

Waterhouse was the daughter of James Lees Kenworthy, an artist and schoolmaster from Ealing, in West London; and Elizabeth, a school-mistress. Waterhouse had eight siblings, and her parents also boarded six students, two nieces and servants.

She first began showing her artwork at the Royal Academy in 1881, regularly participating in exhibits until abruptly stopping in 1890 for an unclear reason. During that time, Waterhouse showed six pieces at the Royal Institute of Painters in Water Colours, and a few other works at the Society of Botanical Artists, New Gallery, and in Birmingham, Manchester and Liverpool. Waterhouse exhibited her flower paintings at the Royal Academy and with the Royal Society of British Artists in London.

Esther Waterhouse married her fellow artist John William Waterhouse at the parish church of Saint Mary in Ealing, in 1883, when she was twenty five and he was thirty four. She thereafter used the name Esther Kenworthy Waterhouse. Initially, they lived in a purpose built artistic colony in Primrose Hill, where the flats had dedicated studios. In 1901, the couple would move to St. John’s Wood, following John William Waterhouse’s promotion to Royal Academician.

The two never had any children, as Esther Waterhouse never wanted any due to her childhood in a crowded boarding schoolhouse. She painted, wrote theatrical reviews, and decorated ceramics.

Following the death of her husband on 10 February 1917, Waterhouse was left to tend his remaining works of art and estate. She sold many of her late husband's work, but still faced considerable financial difficulties due to the declining value of art during World War I. She exhibited Marigolds, a work of hers, at the Academy in 1925, but it is unclear whether it was painted before or after she stopped painting in 1890.

Facing continual financial pressure, in November 1933, she sold her residence in Hall Road and moved to a hotel. She was later cared for in a nursing home in Faversham until December 15, 1944, where she died of a cerebral hemorrhage.

Waterhouse is buried, along with her husband, at Kensal Green Cemetery, and his portrait of her is now owned by Sheffield City Art Galleries.
