= Ester Adaberto =

Italian opera singer (1872–1951)

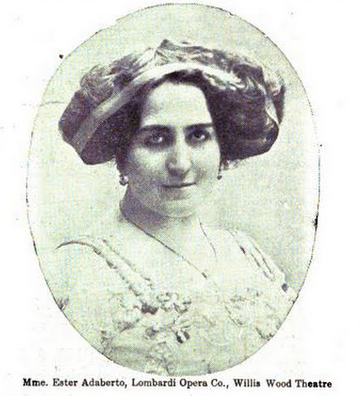
Ester Adaberto, from a 1910 publication.

Ester Adaberto (1872–1951), born Ester Nunez de Arce, was an Italian opera singer.

== Early life ==
Ester Nunez de Arce was born in Naples and raised in Milan. Her father was Spanish, possibly a music professional, and her mother was Neapolitan.

== Career ==
Ester Adaberto, a soprano, debuted on the opera stage in 1897, in Pagliacci at the Teatro Nuovo in Mirandola. She was a member of the Castellano Opera Company and toured Eastern Europe with them. At Vilna she was shot in the arm by a jealous Russian suitor.

In about 1905, she moved to the United States, and toured from coast to coast. She and Nicola Zerola starred in Aida (1909) with the Italian Grand Opera Company, and she sang in Il trovatore (1909) at the Metropolitan Opera in New York, and in Tosca (1913) in San Francisco. In 1913 she traveled to Honolulu with the Lombardi Opera Company. In 1914-1915 she was a leading dramatic soprano with the San Carlo Opera Company. In March 1915, Adaberto was called away for a family emergency in Italy, and Alice Eversman took over her role in Aida. Adaberto made four recordings.

Adaberto's repertoire was said to consist of thirty operas. She was described as "beautiful and charming", with "a flexible voice of wide range...although at times a metallic quality detracted from the effect."

== Personal life ==
She retired from performing in 1917, in grief after the death of her son in World War I. Adaberto died in 1951, aged 79 years, in Milan.
