= Esther Hahn =

American surfer

Esther Kyung-Joo Keleana Hahn (born December 17, 1985) is a professional surfer and action sports personality. Before attending Yale University (class of 2008), Hahn built up an extensive surfing resume with wins and titles in the NSSA (National Scholastic Surfing Association), the USSF (United States Surfing Federation), the ESA (Eastern Surfing Association), and the ASP (Association of Surfing Professionals). In addition to surf competitions, Hahn appeared in many print ad campaigns for her sponsors and other major brands such as JanSport and Lexus. She has also made appearances at the ESPY Awards as well as other red carpet events.

Hahn's current sponsors are Stamps Surfboards, Lifeyo, ZJ Boarding House, and Patagonia.
