= Esther Okello Lutwa =

Ugandan first lady and politician (died 2002)

- Born: Uganda
- Died: 2002
- Citizenship: Uganda
- Occupation: Politician
- Spouse: Tito Okello

Esther Okello Lutwa also known as Esther Dyee Okello was the first lady to Tito Okello, who was the president of Uganda.

== Historical life ==
She was married to Tito Okello who was the president of Uganda between 29 July 1985 to 26 January 1986 as the junior wife. She died following a road accident on Kitgum Matidi which is 14 km east of Kitgum town on March 8, 2002, at Mulago Hospital, She was traveling to Namokora her ancestral home to attend the husband's last funeral service. Esther's children include Henry Oryem Okello who is currently serving as the Minister for Foreign Affairs in the National Resistance Movement government.

== See also ==
- List of political families
- Tito Okello Lutwa
- Henry Oryem Okello
