= Esther Wood =

British art critic (1866–1952/3)

Esther Wood (née Walker, born 1866, died 1952/3) was an English art critic and journalist who wrote Dante Rossetti and the Pre-Raphaelite Movement (1894). She was also a political activist as an early member of the Fabian Society and the Independent Labour Party.

== Biography ==
Wood was born Esther Walker in 1866 in London, England. She was the daughter of Henry Walker FGS.

Wood trained as a journalist described herself as a "writer of art." In 1891, she was awarded the Crawshay prize for two essays on Percy Bysshe Shelley. In the book Dante Rossetti and the Pre-Raphaelite Movement (1894. reprinted in 1973), Wood argued that the Pre-Raphaelites reinvented a mediaeval tradition, praised how their refusal to use stylisation provided the viewer with a sense of realism, and addressed criticisms of the movement. Wood also edited the works of George Eliot, providing introductions for her novels, and wrote numerous articles for journals and magazines principally on subjects relating to art or poetry.

Wood was an early member of both the socialist organisation the Fabian Society and the Independent Labour Party (ILP), and also joined the Pharos Club. In 1902/03, she served on the executive of the Fabian Society. She also chaired the Chelsea ILP branch.

Alongside her writing and political activism, Wood qualified as a sick nurse and also aspired to become a singer.

== Personal life ==
She married J. W. Wood in 1893, and then followed him in joining the Social Democratic Federation. She divorced J. W. Wood in 1897, after which she shared a house in Witley, Surrey with a fellow writer and Fabian member, Gertrude Dix.

== Death ==
Wood died in 1952 or 1953.
