= Esther Ndeti =

Kenyan engineer

- Born: 1985 (age 40–41); Kenya
- Citizenship: Kenyan
- Education: Confucius Institute, Nairobi; (Diploma in Chinese Proficiency); University of Nairobi; (Bachelor of Science in Mechanical Engineering)
- Occupations: Mechanical engineer, corporate executive
- Years active: 2007–present
- Title: Executive director of East Africa Private Equity & Venture Capital Association

Esther Ndeti is a Kenyan mechanical engineer, businesswoman and corporate executive, who serves as an executive director of the East Africa Private Equity & Venture Capital Association (EAVCA), based in Nairobi, the capital city of Kenya, effective 14 January 2017. Prior to her current position, she served as the regional coordinator for the Aspen Network of Development Entrepreneurs (ANDE).

== Background and education ==
Ndeti was born in Kenya circa 1987.

After attending primary school locally, she enrolled in Pangani Girls Secondary School, in Nairobi County, where she obtained her High School Diploma. She was then admitted to the University of Nairobi, where she graduated with a Bachelor of Science degree in mechanical engineering. She also holds a Diploma in Chinese Proficiency, obtained from the Confucius Institute at the University of Nairobi.

== Career ==
Ndeti has had a varied career in business management stretching back to 2007, when she served for a year as the vice president of the corporate sector of the student organisation AIESEC. She then served as the national coordinator for the Trainers Team for another year.

After stints with two local companies in Nairobi, she co-founded and served as director of Gregos Foods Ltd., a Kenyan culinary business. In June 2015, she was hired as the regional coordinator for East Africa of ANDE, Aspen Network of Development Entrepreneurs at the Aspen Institute. ANDE is a global network of organizations that support entrepreneurship in emerging markets.

In February 2017, Ndeti was appointed as executive director of EVCA, responsible for membership, networking, training, business initiatives, strategic partnerships, and media relations.

== Family ==
Ndeti is a mother.

== Other considerations ==
In 2010, she founded ARÊTE, an events management firm.

In 2018, Business Daily Africa, a Kenyan daily English newspaper, named Ndeti one of the "Top 40 Under 40 Kenyan Women" of 2018.
