= Esther Uzodinma =

Nigerian actress (born 2002)

- Born: Esther Uzodinma; Lagos, Nigeria
- Education: University of Lagos
- Occupations: Actress; producer
- Years active: 2018–present
- Known for: My Siblings and I, Sade (The Missing Girl)
- Notable work: Esther Tries

Esther Uzodinma is a Nigerian actress and producer best known for her role as "Angela" in the Africa Magic TV series My Siblings and I.

== Early life and career ==
She is studying Mass Communication at the University of Lagos. In 2018, Esther started her acting career in the Africa Magic drama TV series, My Siblings and I, which was released in January 2018. Esther starred as character "Sade" in the television series Sade (The Missing Girl). She complains about not having attention from men.

== Selected filmography ==
- Cornerstones (2017)
- Cursed Egg (2017)
- Witch Empire (2017)
- Dance Hustlers (2018)
- Secrets (2019)
- Papa Betty (2021)
- All or Nothing (2022)
- Closure (2022)
- A Game of Chess (2022)
- Ije Awele (2022) as Uju
- Now & Beyond (2023) as Chinonso

== Television ==
- Papa Ajasco (2018)
- My Siblings and I (2018) as Angela
- Sade (The Missing Girl) (2020)
