= Esther Warkov (artist) =

Canadian artist (born 1941)

- Born: October 12, 1941 (age 85); Winnipeg, Manitoba, Canada
- Known for: Painter
- Spouse: Frans Visscher (m. 1966, divorced 1978)

Esther Warkov RCA (born October 12, 1941) is a Canadian artist. Warkov is known for her large, segmented surrealist paintings and detailed drawings that invoke a fantasy world in their imagery, often relating to Jewish mysticism.

== Career ==
Warkov was born in Winnipeg, Manitoba. From 1958 to 1961 she studied at the University of Manitoba.

Warkov evokes a dream-like surreal feeling in her work by placing images which hint at the past in cut-outs next to images which may present times nearer the present. The mood she evokes is of a gentle melancholy. But, as one writer pointed out, Warkov's intellectual tools are symbol, allegory and narrative, and these may not always be immediately accessible for the art viewer.

In 1964, the Winnipeg Art Gallery presented her first solo exhibition. In 2016, the WAG hosted "Esther Warkov: Paintings 1960s-1980s" In 1985, the Winnipeg Gallery held an exhibition titled Esther Warkov: Recent Drawings. In 1998, her paper relief constructions were shown there. In 2000, her exhibition House of Tea was shown at the National Gallery of Canada, Ottawa. Her work is included in the collections of the National Gallery of Canada, the Winnipeg Art Gallery, the Beaverbrook Art Gallery, Fredericton, the Montreal Museum of Fine Arts, and the Vancouver Art Gallery, among others.

In 1974, she was elected a member of the Royal Canadian Academy of Arts.
