= Perry Aritua =

Ugandan lawyer and women's rights advocate

- Born: Uganda
- Occupations: Lawyer, Women’s rights advocate
- Years active: 2011–present
- Organization: Women’s Democracy Network – Uganda Chapter (WDN-Uganda)
- Known for: Executive Director of Women’s Democracy Network Uganda Chapter
- Notable work: Advocacy for women's political participation, civic education, gender equality

Perry Aritua is a Ugandan lawyer and women’s rights advocate. She is currently the Executive Director of Women's Democracy Network Uganda Chapter (WDN-Uganda), where she advocates for women's engagement in politics and democratic leadership.

== Career ==
Aritua is a co-founder of WDN-Uganda when the International Republican Institute's Uganda office closed in 2011. The organization is focused on empowering women to participate in political leadership, consolidate democratic processes, and promote inclusive decision-making participation. WDN-Uganda under her leadership has focused on mentoring, civic education, and gender-responsive policy advocacy.

Her works reveal some of the difficulties women face when they run for office, for example; unfair treatment and exclusion. She has shown that it is crucial to prepare women for leadership from the grassroots levels and involve men in supporting women to have equal opportunities.

== Arrest during 2021 elections ==
On 14 January 2021, during Uganda’s general elections, Aritua was arrested along with 25 other civil society members at the National Election Watch–Uganda observation center in Kampala. Authorities accused them of observing elections without accreditation, despite their possession of official credentials. International human rights groups condemned the arrest and called for their immediate release. She believes leadership is not always being and sometimes it is about walking along someone

== See also ==
- Women's rights in Uganda
- Politics of Uganda
- Gender equality
- International Republican Institute
- 2021 Ugandan general election
- Margaret Sekaggya
