= Pia Górska =

Polish artist, social worker and writer (1878–1974)

Pia Maria Górska
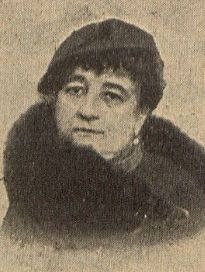
- Born: 15 April 1878; Wola Pękoszewska, Warsaw Governorate, Congress Poland, Russian Empire
- Died: 13 June 1974 (aged 96); Kraków, Poland
- Known for: Painting and religious works
- Parent: Jan Górski
- Relatives: Franciszek Górski, grandfather

Pia Maria Górska (1878–1974) was a Polish painter, poet, writer, teacher, and social and religious activist.

== Early life and education ==
Górska was born on 15 April 1878 in Wola Pękoszewska in the Warsaw Governorate of Congress Poland. She was the daughter of Maria, Countess Łubieńska and Jan Górski, a wealthy landowner and well-known agronomist, and granddaughter of General Franciszek Górski. She was apparently named in honour of Pope Pius IX, who died just before her birth. The Górski family was very religious and her eldest brother, Ludwik, was an unofficial liaison between the Catholic Church of the Kingdom of Poland and the Holy See (with the family palace in Warsaw often being referred to as "the Polish Vatican"). She was educated by private tutors in her family home, which served as a centre of cultural life that influenced both the immediate and wider area, attracting many artists, scientists, and writers from around Poland. The youngest of her four brothers, Konstanty Maria Górski, was an art historian, writer and literary scholar, who had a significant impact on her intellectual and artistic development.

At the age of 13, Górska began studying painting. Her first teacher was the Polish artist, Eligiusz Niewiadomski, who spent his summer vacation in Wola Pękoszewska in 1891. In 1892, she received lessons from Józef Rapacki and painted her first landscapes, and in 1893 she was taught by Sylwester Saski. The following year she took painting lessons from Józef Mehoffer, who placed great emphasis on composition. From that year Józef Chełmoński became her main advisor, having a profound influence on her work. Living nearby, he spent much more time with her than her previous teachers, and was the teacher she respected the most. During that period she also worked in a village orphanage.

== Adult Life ==
Around 1900, Górska stopped painting. While still living in Wola, she frequently travelled to Kraków, where she met many artists and thinkers of the era. During this time, she also regularly travelled abroad with her mother, mainly for medical reasons, to Berlin, Austria, Davos in Switzerland, and Italy. In 1907, she moved to Warsaw, where she lived with her mother in the Górski family home. After completing relevant training, she co-organized the Society for the Protection of Children's Misery Shelters, where she also worked. From 1908, together with Maria Weryho, she gave religious lectures in all the nurseries run by the Warsaw Tram Authority.

From 1914 to 1918, she was an inspector of municipal kindergartens, specializing in religious education, with a goal of reforming religious education to make it more engaging rather than just being learning by rote. She published several books on the subject, most notably Servants of God: Stories and Legends from the Lives of the Saints. All these activities were done voluntarily. At the same time, she raised funds to equip nurseries, with her personal contribution to this cause being financed by accepting commissions to do sketched portraits, something that was heavily criticised by Chełmoński.

== Artistic career ==
Górska spent the period of the Polish-Soviet War in the Poznań region, to where she had moved with her mother. She returned to Warsaw in the autumn of 1920. During the summer holidays of 1922, while in the countryside, she began painting watercolours. In the autumn of 1922, she enrolled in the painting school of Konrad Krzyżanowski. After Krzyżanowski's death and the closure of his school, she passed the entrance exam in composition and nude painting and became an unenrolled student at the Academy of Fine Arts in Warsaw, where she studied in the studio of Tadeusz Pruszkowski. She found the first year of this school difficult because of her recent practice of drawing small portraits and photograph-like studies. She wrore that she knew nothing of transposition and could copy but not compose. Nevertheless, her first exhibition took place in August 1926 in the spa town of Nałęczów. In January 1928, she was invited to participate in a group exhibition at the Zachęta Fine Arts Gallery in Warsaw. In addition to 38 works by Górska, the exhibition featured paintings by Jan Świerczyński and Jan Rosen. The exhibition was favourably received by both the press and the visiting public. In September of the same year, she exhibited at the Zachęta – National Gallery of Art in Warsaw, receiving a bronze medal for her painting Stasiek with a Doll. In the same period several of her works were shown at the Carnegie Museum of Art in Pittsburgh, US, and her painting The Three Kings (The Three Wise Men) was reproduced in several American magazines.

In May 1929, she participated in a major show of contemporary Polish painting at the General National Exhibition organized in Poznań. Among 700 other painters, Górska exhibited four of her works and received a bronze medal. In 1931, she presented two of her paintings at the international exhibition of religious art in Padua, Italy. In 1933, her works were shown at the International Exhibition of Women's Art in Amsterdam, being noticed and positively reviewed by the Dutch press. That same year, she also participated in an exhibition at the 18th Venice Biennale. In 1937, she contributed to the exhibition called Les femmes artistes d'Europe, the first international all-woman art show in France, held at the Jeu de Paume in Paris.

During the 1920s and 1930s she was very active with religious painting. However, many of these works appear not to have survived. Her most outstanding religious pieces include two images painted in 1938–1939: Holy Virgin of Loreto (Patron Saint of Aviators) at the Church of St Francis of Assisi in Okęcie, close to the Warsaw Chopin Airport, and St Jude Thaddaeus in the Holy Cross Church, Warsaw. The paintings are characterized by their original treatment of iconography, combining the dictates of tradition with the artist's lyrical realism.

The evaluation of Górska's works was generally positive: "Softness and refinement, a calm, subtly conceived composition, a noble, truly feminine gentleness of colour, and an innate elegance – these are the fundamental characteristics of the artist's new exhibition," wrote Jan Kleczyński Jr. in the Kurjer Warszawski. The late 1920s and 1930s were her most creative period. In the 1920s she mainly worked on portraits but the years in the lead-up to the World War II witnessed a change in her techniques, particularly with regard to her use of colour and chiaroscuro effects. She began to rediscover enjoyment from her painting. However, in addition to her busy painting career, she also produced literary works. Her most acclaimed publication of this period was her biography O Chełmońskim (On Chełmoński). Many reviews emphasized not only the book's literary merits but also its great documentary value. In these memoirs, Górska described the process by which Józef Chełmoński created many of his works, examining not only the technique itself but also the types of paints and canvases he used. In the 1930s she also published numerous articles for the Catholic press as well as short stories, including those about "Brother Albert", as well as writing two radio plays. Many of her writings have remained unpublished.

== World War II and the post-war period ==
During the Siege of Warsaw (1939), her apartment in the family home burned down. Along with the apartment, her library, several of her own manuscripts, paintings, and a large collection of works by various painters, including Chełmoński, were destroyed. She spent the war years in Wola Pękoszewska, leaving Wola in 1945 to live with the family of her nephew, Andrzej Górski, in Skierniewice and then in Milanówek. In 1947, she moved to Kraków, to live with the family of another nephew. During the war period she supported herself by doing artistic embroidery.

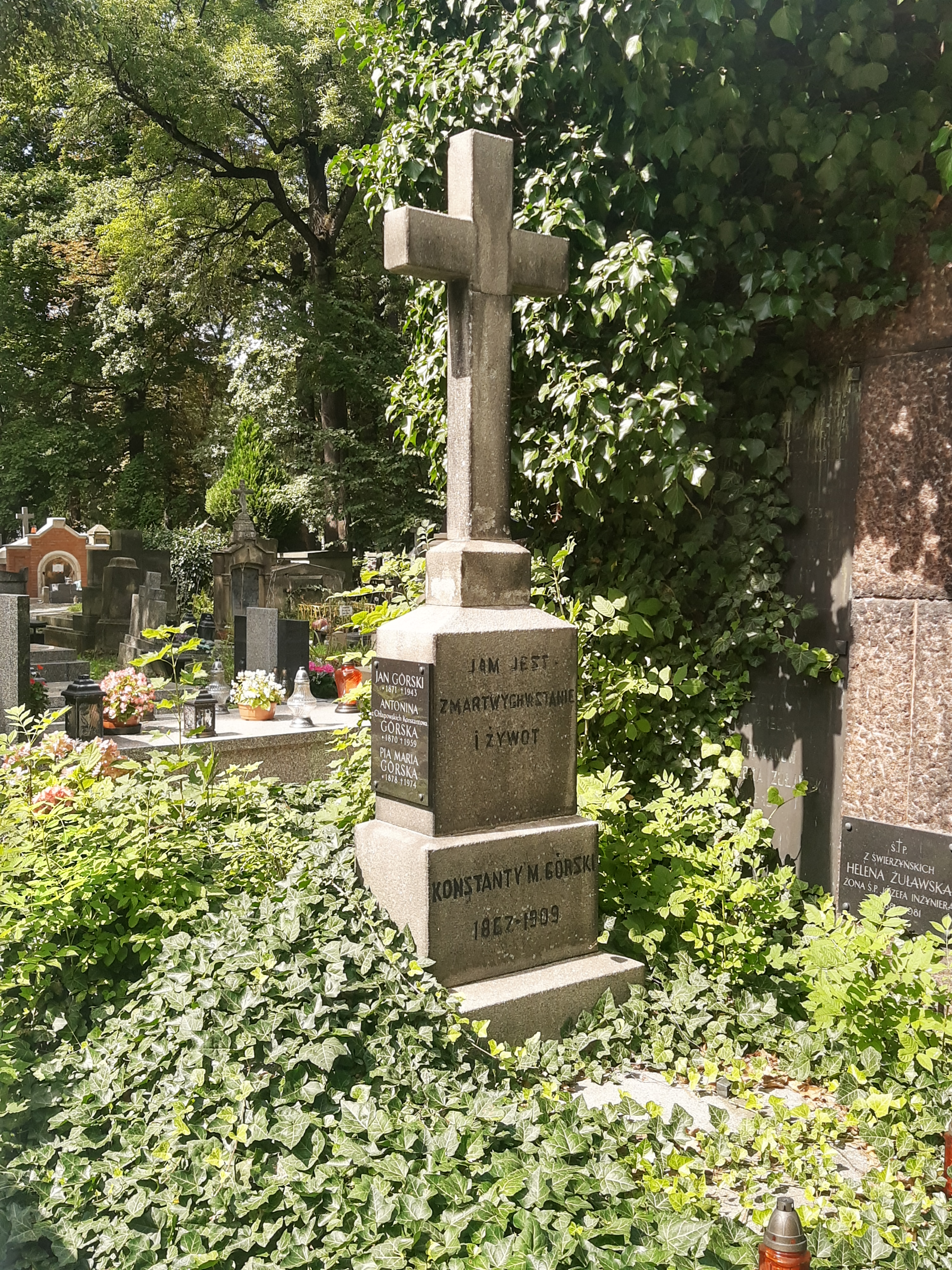
Górska's grave, shared with her brother, Konstanty

From 1939 she painted rarely, but in the postwar period, she wrote relatively prolifically. In 1948, she published a historical novel for young people, set in the 13th century, titled Shield and Hood. A few years later, she published another historical novel, this time retracing the events of the birth of Jesus Christ in The City of David. Górska's memoirs, titled Paleta i Pióro (Palette and Pen), were published in 1956. Unfortunately, this book was severely affected by political censorship, as the author explained in her correspondence with another relative. These memoirs contained many profiles of the painters and writers she had met. The book was very popular, and a second edition appeared a few years after the first.

== Death and legacy ==
Górska died in Krakow on 13 June 1974. She was buried in the Rakowicki Cemetery in the city. Many of her paintings were destroyed during the war but some were purchased for public collections. Others remain with the family.
