= Michalina Krzyżanowska =

Polish artist (1883–1962)

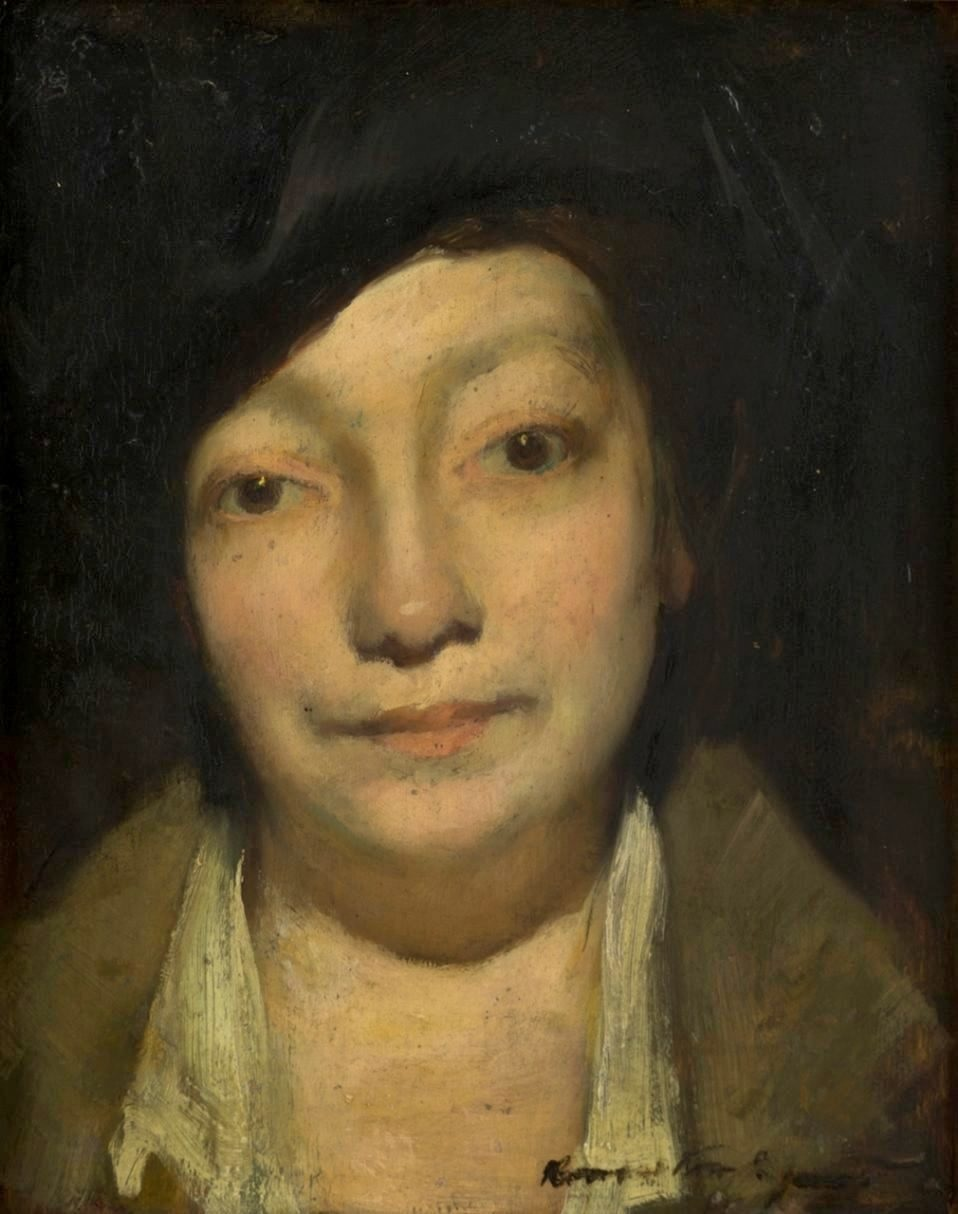
- Portrait of Krzyżanowska by her husband
- Born: Michalina Piotruszewski; 3 September 1883; Warsaw, Poland
- Died: 16 July 1962 (aged 78); Warsaw
- Known for: Painting
- Movement: Expressionism
- Spouse: Konrad Krzyżanowski

Michalina Krzyżanowska (née Piotruszewski: 1883–1962) was a Polish Expressionist landscape painter and wife of the artist and teacher, Konrad Krzyżanowski. Under the German occupation during World War II and in the subsequent Soviet occupation, she worked for the Polish underground resistance, for which she spent two years in prison.

== Early life and education ==
Krzyżanowska was born on 3 September 1883 in Poland's capital, Warsaw. Her parents, Franciszek Piotruszewski and Maria (née Andrzeykowicz) were members of the Polish landed gentry, coming from Volhynia. Although born in Warsaw, she was raised in the countryside where, from an early age, she began to exhibit strong artistic skills. The family appears to have travelled widely. There exists a photograph of her as a young girl, taken in Montreux in Switzerland. She began to formally study painting with private lessons from Miłosz Kotarbiński. In 1904, she joined the Warsaw School of Fine Arts in its first year of operation, studying with Krzyżanowski, whom she married in November 1906. She would pose for her husband on many occasions and his portraits of her are among his finest works. During her studies, she participated in plein-air workshops organized by her husband in Łowicz (1904), Zwierzyniec (1905), and Istebna (1906), all in Poland, as well as Verkiai in Lithuania (1907), when she exhibited for the first time at the School of Fine Arts in Vilnius, in Liepāja in Latvia and in Finland, both in 1908. In 1907, they both travelled to Italy and Corsica. She graduated in 1909, and Krzyżanowski resigned from his teaching position at the same time. Three years later, they spent some time in London and then moved to Paris, where she further developed her painting skills at the Académie Ranson with Maurice Denis.

== Later life ==
In 1914, the couple returned to Warsaw but, after the outbreak of World War I, they went to live with relatives in Volhynia. In 1917, they settled in Kyiv in Ukraine, where her husband taught at the Polish School of Fine Arts. At the end of the war in 1918, they returned to Warsaw, permitting her husband to reopen his private painting school. Krzyżanowska participated in plein-air workshops organized by her husband for students in Płock, Kartuzy, and Chmielno. She began to exhibit after her husband's death in 1922, mainly showing landscapes that were often inspired by her time in Volhynia. She only painted in oils, including for sketches, using various surfaces such as canvas, plywood, and even cardboard. Although some of her early works bear a resemblance to her husband's landscapes, she quickly developed her own style, notable for its use of colours and light.

She joined the Society for the Encouragement of Fine Arts and the Polish Seascape Circle, and began participating in exhibitions held in Poland and abroad, winning several awards. Despite her late arrival as a regular exhibiting artist, at the age of 39, her work quickly gained critical acclaim, both in Poland and elsewhere. She often exhibited with the Ars Feminae group of women painters, which also included Olga Boznańska and Pia Górska. In 1927 she travelled again to France and Italy. Krzyżanowska did many paintings on nautical themes and was invited to contribute to maritime exhibitions. Throughout the 1920s and 1930s she held several solo exhibitions, including one in 1928 that presented her paintings from Corsica. In 1933, her works were shown at the First International Exhibition of Women's Art at the Stedelijk Museum Amsterdam and, in 1934, at the Second International Exhibition, held this time at the Institute of Art Propaganda in Warsaw. In 1937, she contributed to the exhibition called Les femmes artistes d'Europe, the first international all-woman art show in France, held at the Jeu de Paume in Paris. Outside of Poland, she was also exhibited in Copenhagen, Tallinn, Moscow, Riga, London, Birmingham, Ottawa, and New York.

== Role in the resistance ==
During the German occupation of Poland (1939–1945), she served as a liaison for Henryk Józewski (an artist and her close friend from before the war) who was commander of the Warsaw Voivodeship district in the Piłsudski-backed underground group "Poland Fights". She maintained contact with the writer, Zygmunt Kubicki, forwarding correspondence from Józewski, and receiving press from other underground organizations and information from radio surveillance. She also distributed papers published by "Poland Fights". Her code name was "Mrs Mouse", based on her husband's nickname for her. She returned to artistic work shortly after the war. In 1945, she participated in an exhibition in Radom, and two years later was again exhibiting in Warsaw. However, she remained in constant danger as, from the spring of 1945, Józewski resumed his underground activities, this time in the anti-communist underground, with Krzyżanowska becoming one of his closest associates, distributing the illegal magazine Polska Niezawisła (Independent Poland). From 1947, she went into hiding from the communist secret police. Around 1953, she was arrested and sentenced to five years in prison, but was released two years later for health reasons. While she was in detention her and her husband's paintings were taken from her home and put into storage at the National Museum in Warsaw.

== Awards and honours ==
Krzyżanowska received the Polish Golden Cross of Merit on 11 November 1934.

== Death and Legacy ==
Krzyżanowska died in Warsaw on 16 July 1962. She was buried at the Powązki Cemetery in that city (plot 234–5–5,6). In 1980/81, a few of her works were shown at the National Museum as part of an exhibition devoted to her husband's work. In December 1999, the Royal Łazienki Museum organized an exhibition of her work. More than ten of her paintings are in the collection of the National Museum. Several paintings with maritime themes are held by the National Maritime Museum, Gdańsk. Several other museums also hold individual paintings, but most of her works are in private collections.
