= Maria Gutkowska-Rychlewska =

Polish painter and curator (1899 – 1991)

- Born: Maria Stanisława Gutkowska; 4 June 1899; Kraków, Poland
- Died: 24 September 1991 (aged 92); Kraków
- Resting place: Rakowicki Cemetery
- Education: Jan Matejko Academy of Fine Arts
- Occupations: Painter, Curator

Maria Stanisława Gutkowska-Rychłowska (4 June 1899, Kraków – 24 September 1991, Kraków) was a Polish painter, graphic designer, and curator at the National Museum in Kraków. She was one of the first female students at the Jan Matejko Academy of Fine Arts, and wrote the textbook Historia ubioru (lit. 'History of Costume').

== Life ==
Maria Stanisława Gutkowska was born to Julia Stanisława (née Peszkowska) and Roman Radosław Gutkowski. Maria was the third child in the Gutkowski family; she had two older brothers, Tadeusz and Roman.

From 1909 to 1917, she attended the Queen Jadwiga Girls' Gymnasium in Kraków. After passing her matura exams, she began her studies at the Philosophy of the Jagiellonian University. Between 1917 and 1922, she studied art history, classical archaeology, and philosophy. Her doctoral dissertation was titled Jan Nepomuceno Głowacki (1802–1847). Her thesis supervisor was Professor Jerzy Mysielski.

The conferral of her doctorate in philosophy (specializing in art history) took place on 7 December 1923, in the presence of the Rector, Professor Władysław Natanson; the Dean of the Faculty, Professor Karol Strescher; and her supervisor, Professor Jerzy Mysielski.

In 1919, while still a student at the Jagiellonian University, Maria began her studies at the Jan Matejko Academy of Fine Arts. She chose the studio of Ignacy Pieńkowski. She studied there for eight semesters (with breaks between 1919 and 1924). She subsequently continued her studies in the studio led by Wojciech Weiss (for three semesters between 1924 and 1926) and later under Jan Wojnarski (for two semesters between 1926 and 1927). In 1926, as a scholarship holder of the Academy of Fine Arts in Kraków, she traveled to France and Italy for seven months to conduct research in local museums and libraries. On 26 June 1927, she obtained her diploma from the Special School of Graphic Arts at the same Academy, graduating with honors.

She began exhibiting her graphic works in 1926. In May 1928, during the annual meeting of the Polish Academy of Arts and Sciences, Maria received the Feliks Jasiński and Witold Łoziński Prize in the field of graphic art for her work View of the Interior of St. Mark’s Basilica in Venice. This news appeared in the 1929 illustrated calendar published by the Kalendarzu Ilustrowanym Kuryera Codziennego na Rok ; the page featured photographs of the 1928 Polish Academy of Arts and Sciences prize winners four men and Maria.

In 1927, she began working as a teacher of painting, costume design, and art history at the State Vocational School for Women on Syrokomli Street in Kraków. She worked there with an interruption until 1945. The school’s history dates back to 1882, when craft courses for women were established at the municipal St. Scholastica Departmental School. Later, these courses were transformed into the School of Applied Crafts for Women, operating in conjunction with the women’s divisional school. The school’s aim was to prepare women for the demands of everyday life. The institution enjoyed great popularity.

== History of Costume ==
While working at a school, she noticed the lack of a suitable textbook on the history of costume. She decided to remedy this situation. To that end, between 1930 and 1933, she visited libraries and collections in Berlin, Paris, Brussels, and Prague to delve into the history of clothing. In 1932, a textbook on the history of costume, intended for vocational schools and theaters, was published. This work, titled Historia ubiorów (History of Costume), saw a second edition in 1968, expanded with additional text and illustrations. The book remains relevant to this day and is considered the most important Polish publication in the field of costume history; it is essential reading for anyone interested in the subject. It covers the history of dress from ancient Egypt through to the Industrial Revolution. It also includes a special supplement featuring clothing patterns from various eras (16th to 19th centuries) and a glossary of terms related to clothing, textiles, and accessories at the end.

Illustrations and black-and-white photographs are integrated into the text, serving as an excellent visual complement. The hand-drawn illustrations were created by Maria, who based them on various works of art. To understand the history of costume, she analyzed secular and religious painting, sculpture, reliefs, graphic art, book illustrations, and fashion prints. She also studied Fashion accessories, hairstyles, and footwear.

== Work at the National Museum in Kraków ==
In 1951, she began working in the library of the former Museum of Industry, which had by then been incorporated into the structure of the National Museum in Kraków. There, she compiled a catalogue for the ornamentation department and conducted art-historical research. At the end of 1951, she was transferred to the National Museum’s Department of Decorative Arts. She focused on silk textiles and clothing, later assuming leadership of the textile conservation studio and the textiles and clothing department. From 1952, she worked as an assistant in the Department of Decorative Arts and Material Culture (clothing section). In September 1952, Maria took charge of the textile conservation studio. Through experimentation, she and the studio staff developed an improved method for cleaning and conserving objects without the use of chemicals; this method was applied, among other instances, to the cleaning of all textiles from the Jan Matejko House.

In 1953, together with Irena Bojarska-Czarnota (also one of the first female students at the Kraków Academy of Fine Arts), she organized an exhibition titled Clothing Through the Ages as a Product of Art and Craft, the first exhibition of historical costumes in Poland with such a broad scope.

Her husband, Włodzimierz Rychlewski, was a civil engineer eleven years her senior who worked on the construction of Nowa Huta. She had no children. In early 1956, Maria attained the rank of docent and the position of museum curator. From 1958, she worked concurrently in the Department of Decorative Arts at the Czartoryski Collections; however, she resigned from this role in 1964, as balancing work at two locations proved difficult. In September 1963, she was awarded the Knight's Cross of the Order of Polonia Restituta in recognition of her professional and scholarly work. She retired in 1970.

== Death ==
Maria Gutkowska-Rychlewska died on 24 September 1991, in Kraków. She was buried at the Rakowicki Cemetery in Kraków.

== Works in collections ==
- Silesian Museum (Katowice) (two etchings)

== Publications ==
- M. Gutkowska-Rychlewska, Historia ubiorów, Lwów-Warszawa, t. 1-2, 1932.
- M. Gutkowska-Rychlewska, Ubiory w Ołtarzu Mariackim Wita Stwosza na tle zabytków w. XV, Kraków 1935
- M. Gutkowska-Rychlewska, M. Taszycka, Ubiory i akcesoria mody wieku XIX, Małe Katalogi Zabytków Wybranych, nr 2, Muzeum Narodowe w Krakowie, Kraków 1967
- M. Gutkowska-Rychlewska, Patynki z Pyrzyc na tle mody obuwia średniowiecznego, „Rozprawy i Sprawozdania Muzeum Narodowego w Krakowie”, IX, 1967, s. 33–41
- M. Gutkowska-Rychlewska Maria, Historia ubiorów, Wrocław–Warszawa–Kraków 1968
