= Andrzej Bursa =

Polish poet and writer

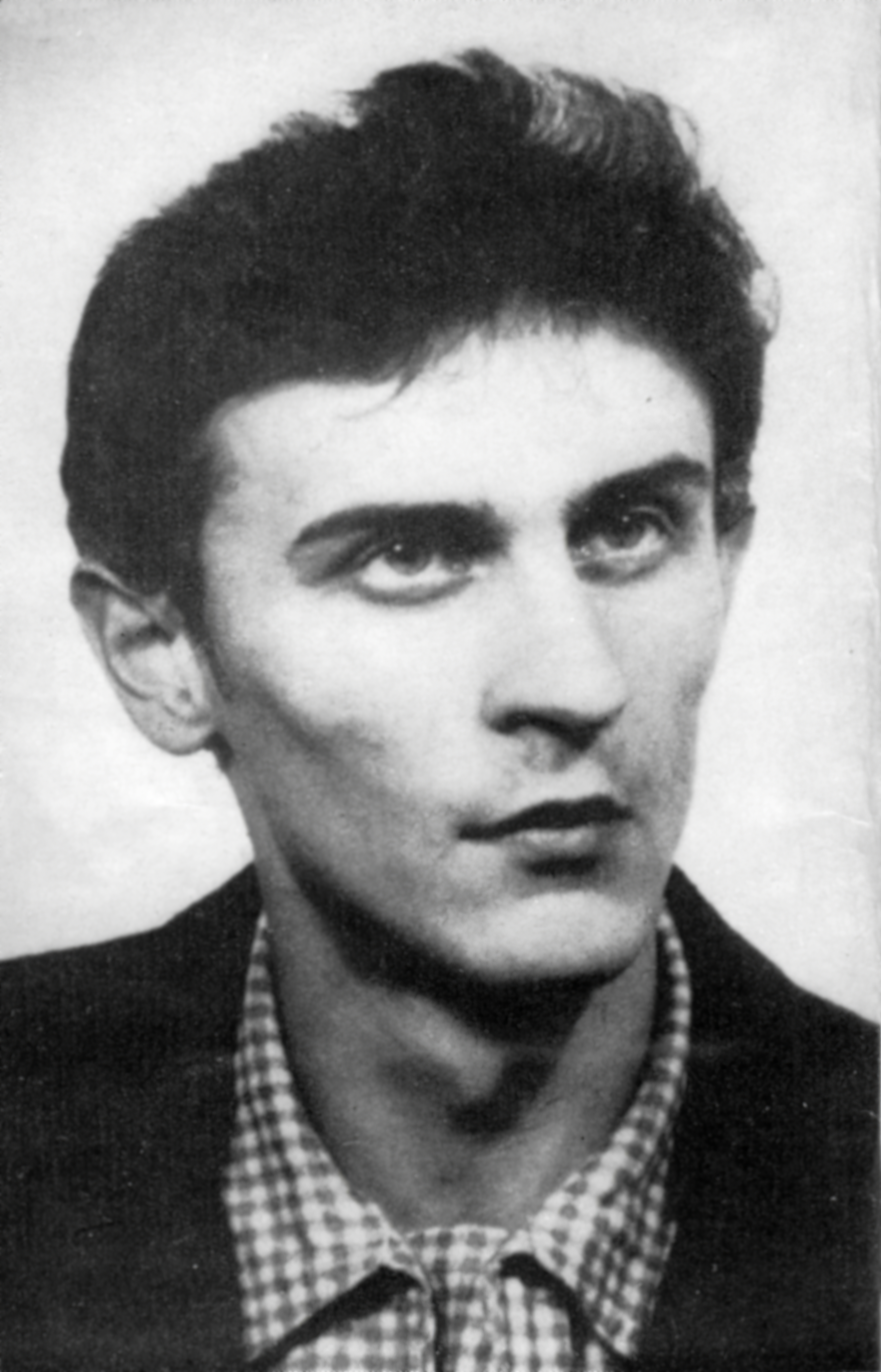
- Born: 21 March 1932; Kraków
- Died: 15 November 1957 (aged 25); Kraków
- Resting place: Rakowicki Cemetery, Kraków.
- Occupations: poet, novelist, journalist
- Spouse: Ludwika Szemioth (m. 1952–1957)

Andrzej Bursa (21 March 1932 – 15 November 1957) was a Polish poet and writer.

Born in Kraków, he studied journalism, then Bulgarian at Jagiellonian University in Kraków. In 1954–1957 Bursa worked as a journalist and reporter for the Kraków newspaper Dziennik Polski. Many of his contemporaries attributed his early death at the age of 25 to suicide, while the true cause of it was a congenital heart disease. He was buried at the Rakowicki Cemetery.

Bursa published his first poem in 1954. A prolific writer, he published 37 poems and a short story in different magazines during his lifetime. He died of a heart attack in 1957. Shortly thereafter, his first poetry collection was published, an important event in Polish poetry. Presently, there is a poetry prize named after Bursa which many living Polish poets have won (e.g. Ewa Lipska and Stanisław Barańczak).
