= Rakowicki Cemetery =

Necropolis in Kraków, Poland

Rakowice Cemetery
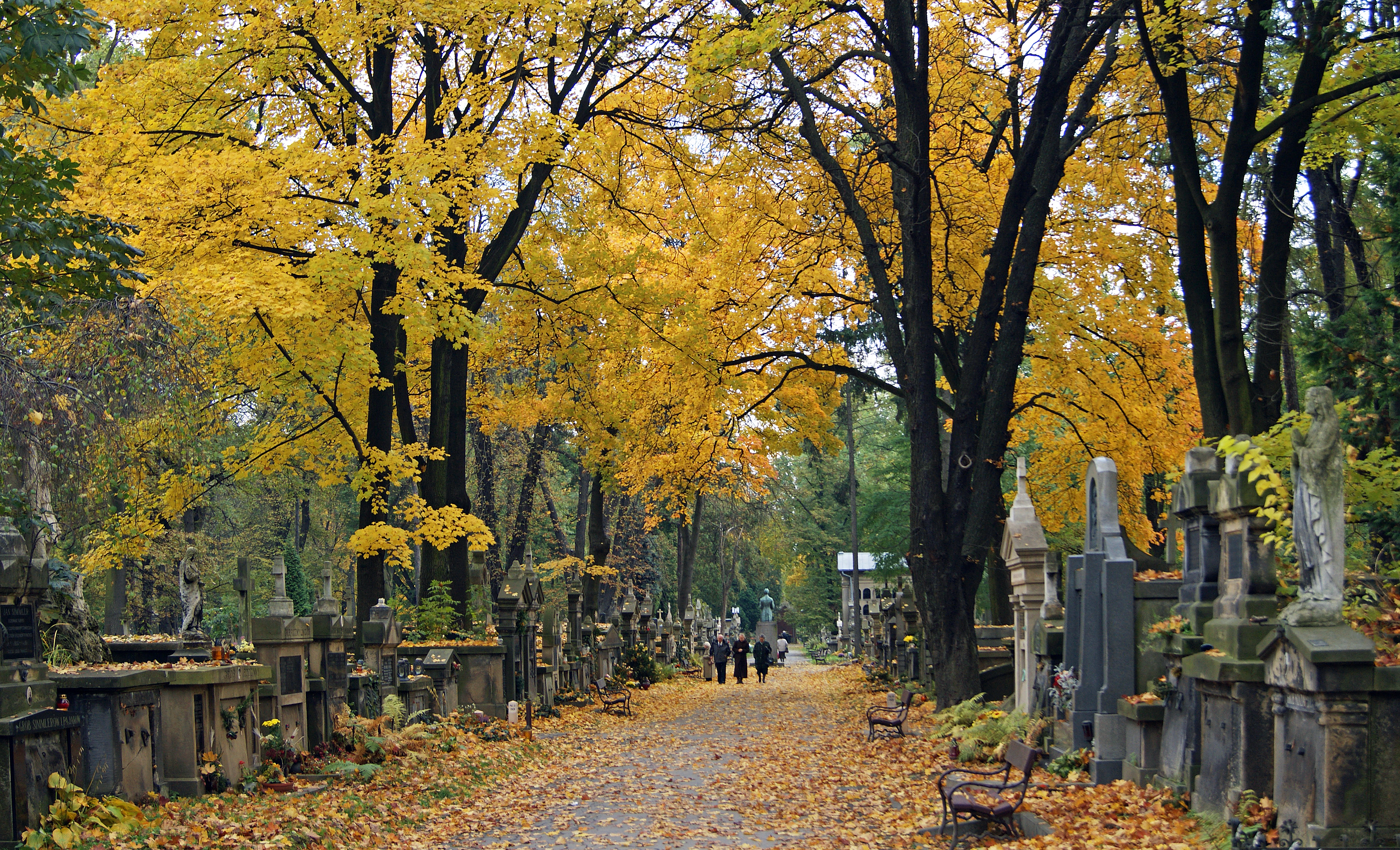
- Main alley
- Interactive map of Rakowice Cemetery

Details
- Established: 1803
- Location: 26 Rakowicka Street; Kraków
- Country: Poland
- Coordinates: 50.075°N 19.952°E
- Type: Public
- Owned by: ZCK Kraków
- Size: 42 hectares (100 acres)
- Website: www.zck-krakow.pl/13/graveyards/2/cmentarz_rakowicki

Rakowicki Cemetery (Polish: Cmentarz Rakowicki [ˈt͡smɛntaʂ rakɔˈvit͡skʲi]) is a historic necropolis and a cultural heritage monument located at 26 Rakowicka Street in Warszawskie, the former district of Kraków, Poland.

Founded at the beginning of the 19th century when the region was part of Austrian Galicia, the cemetery was expanded several times, and at present covers an area of about 42 ha (100 acres). Many notable Cracovians are buried here.

== History ==
The Rakowice Cemetery was set up in 1800–1802 at an estate in Prądnik Czerwony village, originally on an area of only 5.6 ha. It was first used in mid-January 1803. The new cemetery came into existence in relation to a public health-related government ban on burials in old church cemeteries within the city. The land was purchased for 1,150 zlotys from the monastery of the Discalced Carmelites of Czerna, and built with funds from the city and the surrounding villages (including some future Districts of Kraków): Rakowice, Prądnik Czerwony and Biały, Olsza, Grzegórzki, Piaski, Bronowice, Czarna Village, Nowa Village, Krowodrza and Kawiory, all granted the right to bury their dead there. The first funeral took place on January 15, 1803, with the burial of an 18-year-old named Apolonia from the Lubowiecki family of Bursikowa estate.

In 1807, the first well was dug, and in 1812 the first big cross was built, paid for by public contributions. Rakowice Cemetery was repeatedly enlarged over the years. The first expansion came in 1836 when 100% more land was bought from Carmelite friars for 5,000 zloty. The design of the new part of the cemetery was commissioned from architect Karol R. Kremer, head of the department of urban construction, who gave it the form of a city park. The surrounding wall was made using bricks and stones obtained from the demolished Church of All Saints. The newly built cemetery was blessed on November 2, 1840. The first chapel was erected in 1862, six years after the Austrian permit was issued. In 1863 the city purchased more land from Carmelite friars – and from Walery Rzewuski – on the west side of the cemetery, and buried there victims of an epidemic of 1866. In 1877 the new administrative centre was built along with the mortuary. The next expansion took place ten years later, in the autumn of 1886. In this new section, the nominal painter Jan Matejko was buried there, among other notables.

Between 1933 and 1934 the cemetery was widened at its north end, across an old military base, with a city street eliminated. In 1976, it was finally entered into the list of local heritage sites, and in 1979 it was the last place visited by Pope John Paul II during his June 2–10 first papal visit to his native homeland.

== Cultural significance ==
The necropolis is a place of burial of the ordinary citizens of the city as well as national heroes: famous writers, scientists, representatives of noble families, independence fighters, political and social activists, leaders and participants of Polish independence movements and insurrections, and veterans of the 20th century's two World Wars, among others. The name Rakowice Cemetery derives from a village of Rakowice 2 km away.

=== Layout ===
Within the cemetery, there are special sections allocated to graves of the participants of Polish national uprisings such as the November Uprising, the January Uprising, and the Kraków Uprising. First World War casualties are buried there, including ethnically Polish soldiers conscripted into all three imperial armies: Austrian, Russian, and Prussian – most of whom died in local hospitals. There are members of Polish Legions; the participants of the Charge at Rokitna; the workers killed during strikes of 1923 and 1936.

=== National significance ===
The cemetery is a national monument of great historical and artistic value. Its selected gravestones and mausoleums are the work of well-known architects, among them, Teofil Żebrawski, Feliks Księżarski, Sławomir Odrzywolski, Jan Szczepkowski, as well as sculptors such as Konstanty Laszczka, Tadeusz Błotnicki, Wacław Szymanowski, Karol Hukan and others. In 1981 a Public Committee for the Preservation of Kraków was founded, with a special sub-committee for the saving of the cemeteries of Kraków and other regional heritage sites. OKRK is organizing an annual collection for the restoration of historic tombs and gravestones. Works are being conducted simultaneously at the Rakowice Cemetery and the New Foothill Cemetery (with the cooperation of the Association Podgórze.pl). OKRK is organizing an annual donation drive, raising funds for the renovation of historic tombs and the public monuments. Public funds are used for the restoration of deteriorating tombs without owners.

== Notable interments ==
Those buried at the Rakowice Cemetery include:

- Maria Gutkowska-Rychlewska (1899 – 1991), painter and curator
- Teodor Axentowicz (1859–1938), painter
- Gabriela Balicka-Iwanowska (1871–1962), botanist, legislator
- Michał Bałucki (1837–1901), playwright and poet
- Andrzej Bursa (1932–1957), poet and writer
- Adam Chmielowski (1845–1916), nobleman and painter
- Hanna Helena Chrzanowska (1902–1973), Roman Catholic nurse
- Maximilian Cercha (1818–1907), painter
- Napoleon Cybulski (1854–1919), physiologist
- Emil Czyrniański (1824–1888), chemist
- Ignacy Daszyński (1866–1936), socialist politician and journalist
- Józef Dietl (1804–1878), physician
- Stanisław Elgas (1876–1973), Polish Army colonel; founder of the 17th Infantry Regiment and participant in the 1918 liberation of Rzeszów.
- Stanisław Estreicher (1869–1939), historian
- Józef Andrzej Gierowski (1922–2006), historian
- Pia Górska (1878–1974), painter, social worker and religious writer
- Marek Grechuta (1945–2006), singer, songwriter, composer, and lyricist
- Julian Gutowski (1823–1890), politician
- Henryk Hiż (1917–2006), analytical philosopher
- Antonina Hoffmann (1842–1897), theatre actress
- Emeryk Hutten-Czapski (1828–1896), nobleman, scholar, and numismatist
- Roman Ingarden (1893–1970), philosopher
- Tadeusz Kantor (1915–1990), theatre director
- Oskar Kolberg (1814–1890), ethnographer and folklorist
- Apollo Korzeniowski (1820–1869), poet, playwright, translator, and father of novelist Joseph Conrad
- Juliusz Kossak (1824–1899), painter
- Wojciech Kossak (1856–1942), painter
- Stanisław Kutrzeba (1876–1946), historian and politician
- Barbara Kwiatkowska-Lass (1940–1995), actress
- Eugeniusz Kwiatkowski (1888–1974), politician and economist
- Tadeusz Lehr-Spławiński (1891–1965), linguist
- Juliusz Leo (1861–1918), politician and academic
- Anatol Lewicki (1841–1899), historian
- Zygmunt Marek (1872–1931), socialist politician
- Jan Matejko (1838–1893), painter
- Edmund Matejko (1829–1907), insurgent, teacher, older brother of Jan Matejko
- Józef Mehoffer (1869–1946), painter and decorative artist
- Piotr Michałowski (1800–1855), painter
- Maria Irena Mileska (1908–1988), geographer, war resister
- Helena Modrzejewska (1840–1909), actress
- Janina Oszast (1908–1986), biologist and resistance movement member
- Tadeusz Pankiewicz (1908–1993), pharmacist
- Stefan Pawlicki (1839–1916), philosopher
- Henryk Reyman (1897–1963), footballer
- Lucjan Rydel (1870–1918), playwright and poet
- John Segrue (1884-1942), English journalist
- Klemens Stefan Sielecki (1903–1980), engineer
- Maciej Słomczyński (1922–1998), translator and writer
- Ignaz Sowinski (1858–1917), architect
- Jerzy Stuhr (1947–2024), actor
- Władysław Szafer (1886–1970), botanist
- Józef Szujski (1835–1883), politician, historian, and poet
- Wislawa Szymborska (1923–2012), poet, essayist, translator, and Nobel Prize winner
- Adolf Szyszko-Bohusz (1883–1948), architect
- Jan Śleszyński (1854–1931), mathematician
- Rafał Taubenschlag (1881–1958), historian of law
- Dorota Terakowska (1938–2004), Polish writer and journalist
- Adam Vetulani (1901–1976), historian
- Jerzy Vetulani (1936–2017), neuroscientist
- Tadeusz Vetulani (1897–1952), agriculturalist
- Rudolf Weigl (1883–1957), biologist
- Bolesław Wieniawa-Długoszowski (1881–1942), general, politician, freemason, diplomat, and poet
- Wiktor Zin (1925–2007), architect and graphic artist
- Mikołaj Zyblikiewicz (1823–1887), politician and lawyer

== Points of interest ==
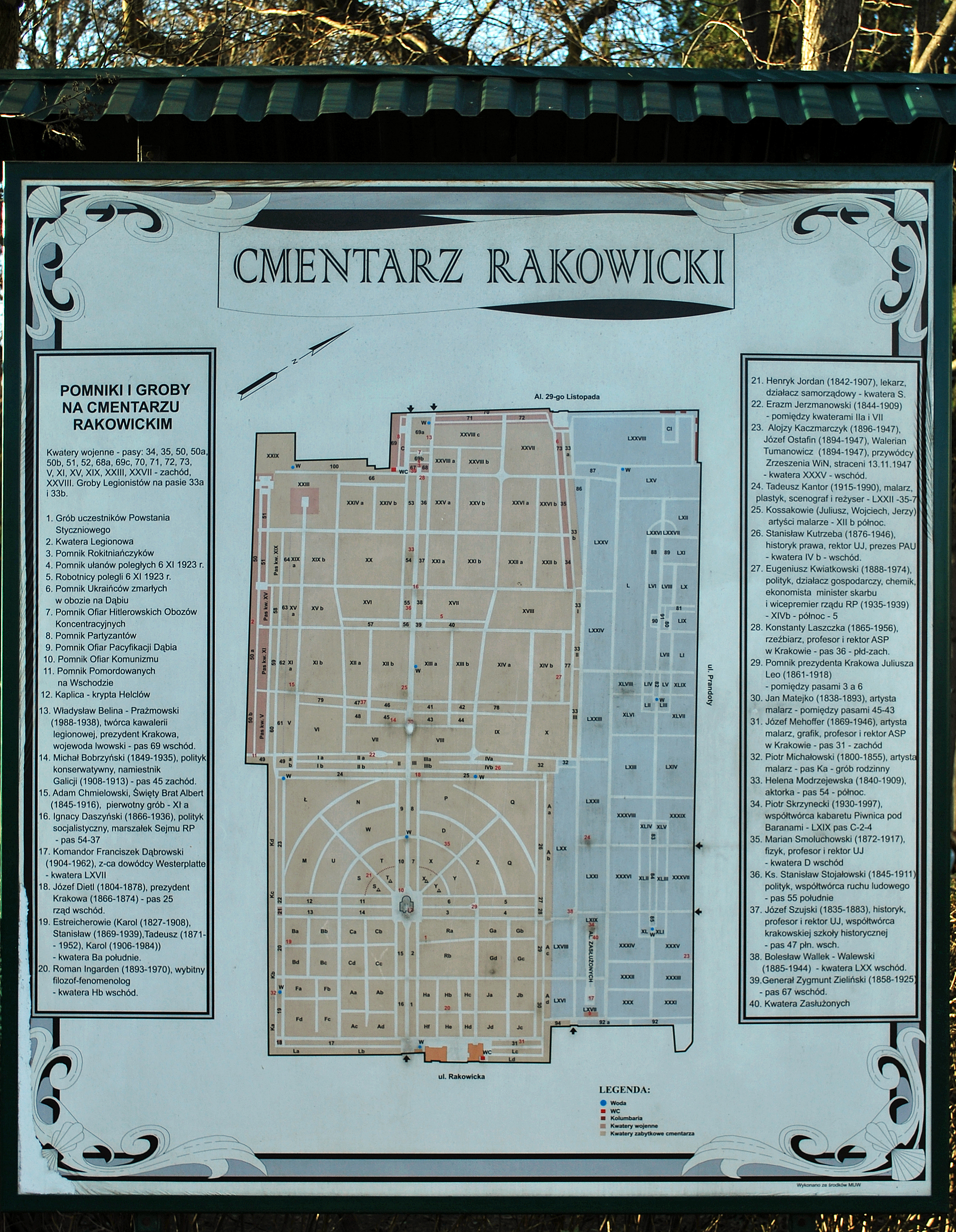
Plan

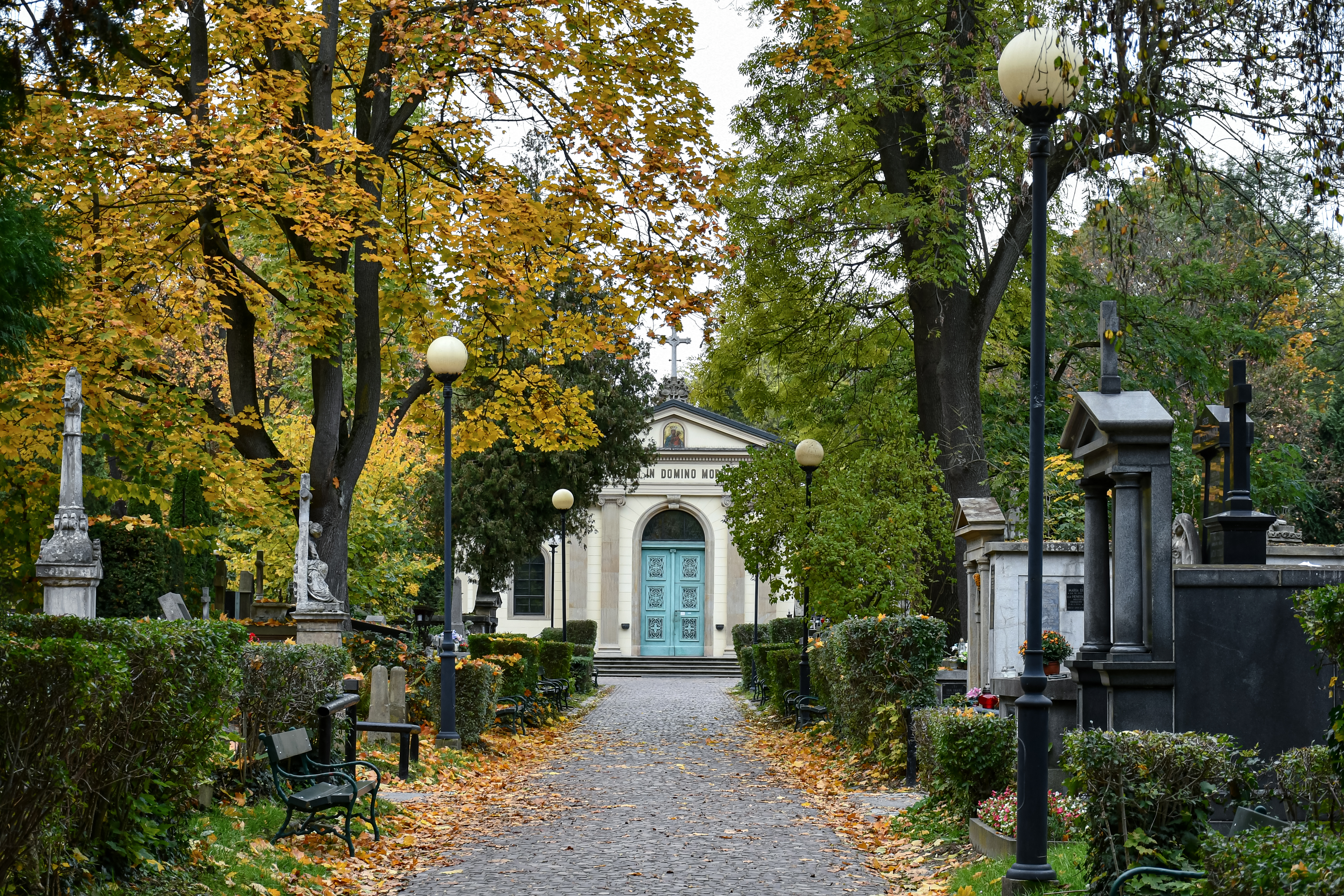
The Chapel of the Resurrection and the oldest part of the cemetery

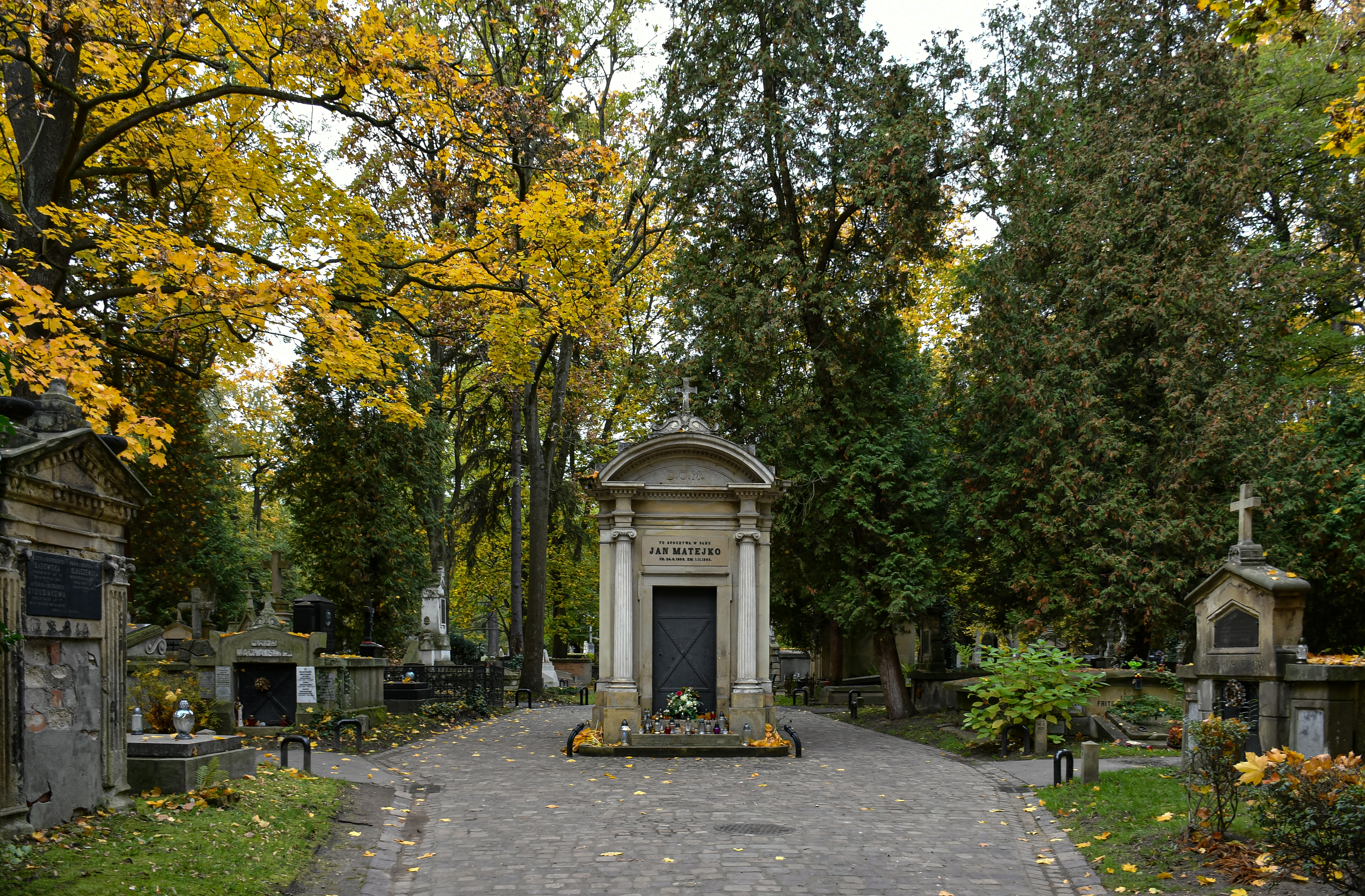
Tomb of painter Jan Matejko

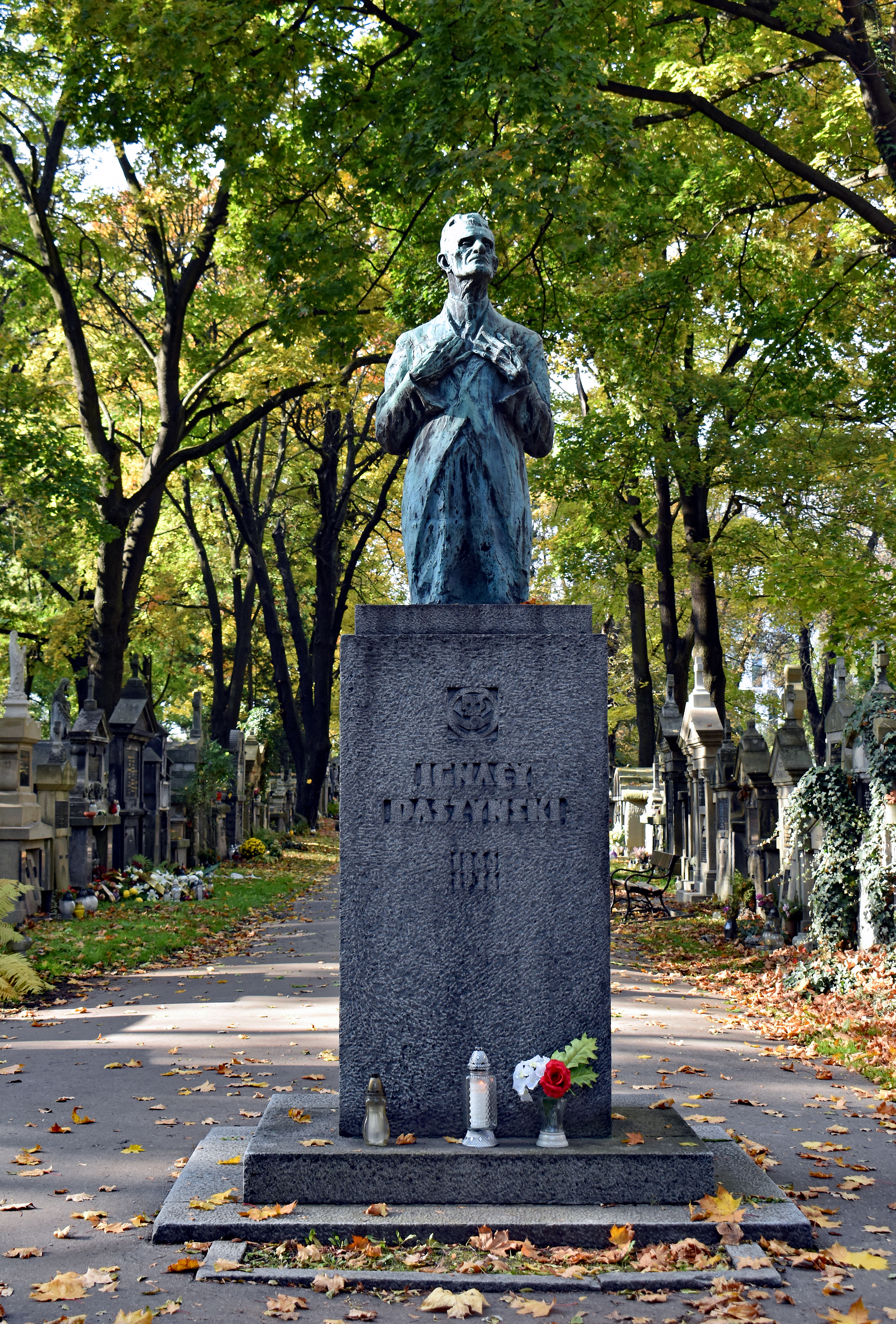
Memorial and tomb of Ignacy Daszyński, Polish politician and Prime Minister of Poland

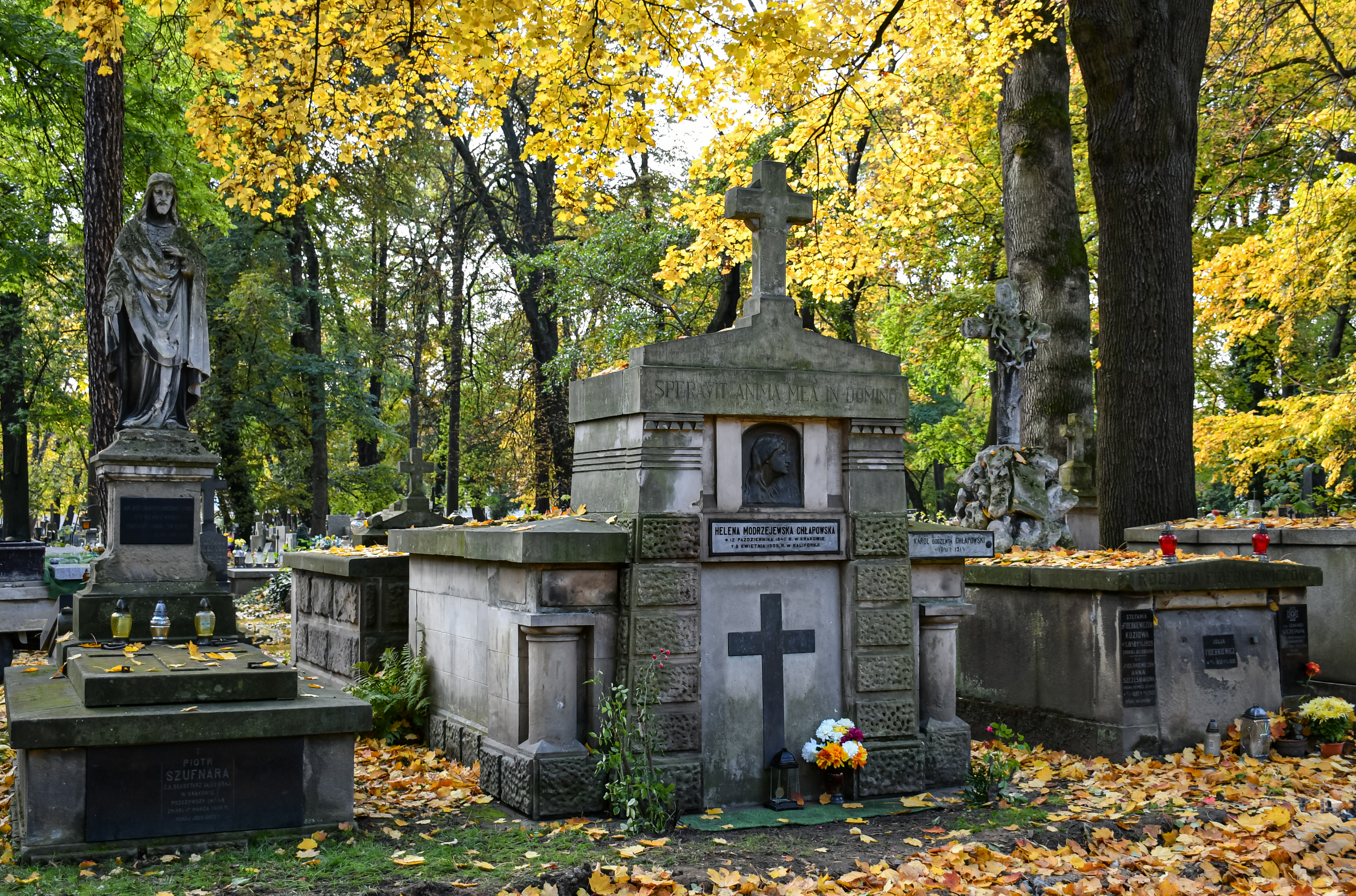
Tomb of Helena Modjeska

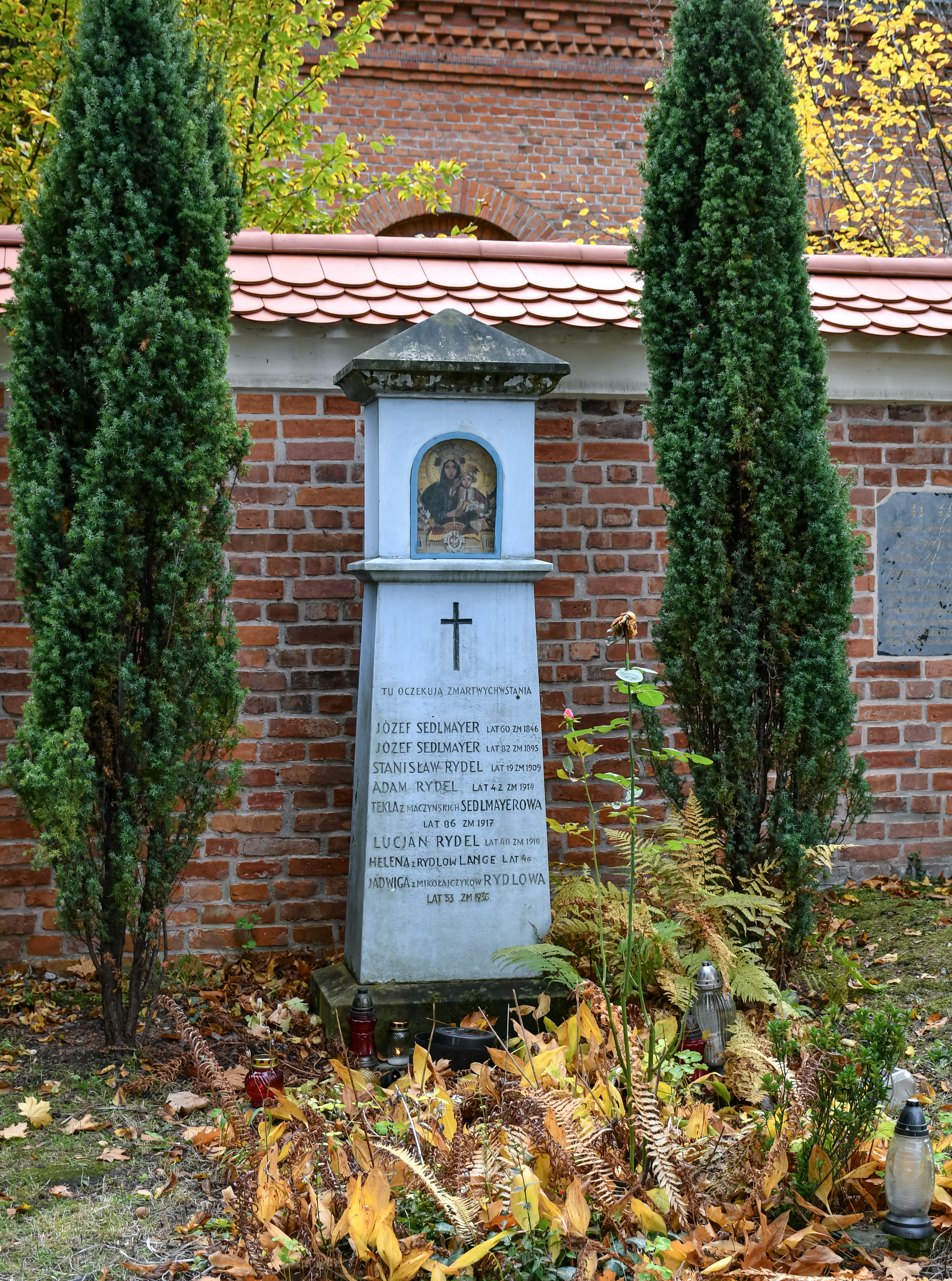
Tomb of Lucjan Rydel,
in the form of a roadside chapel

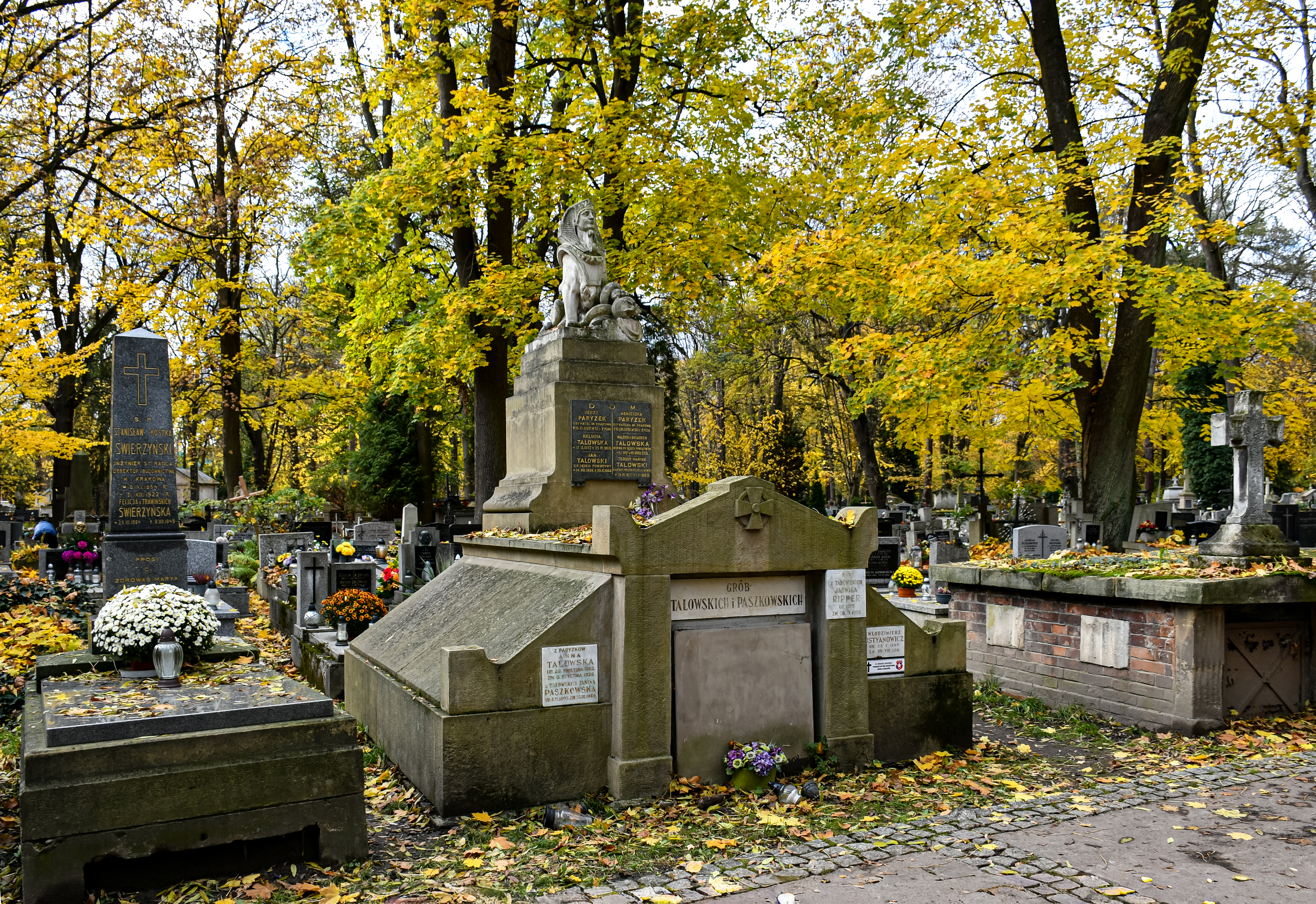
Tomb of architect Teodor Talowski

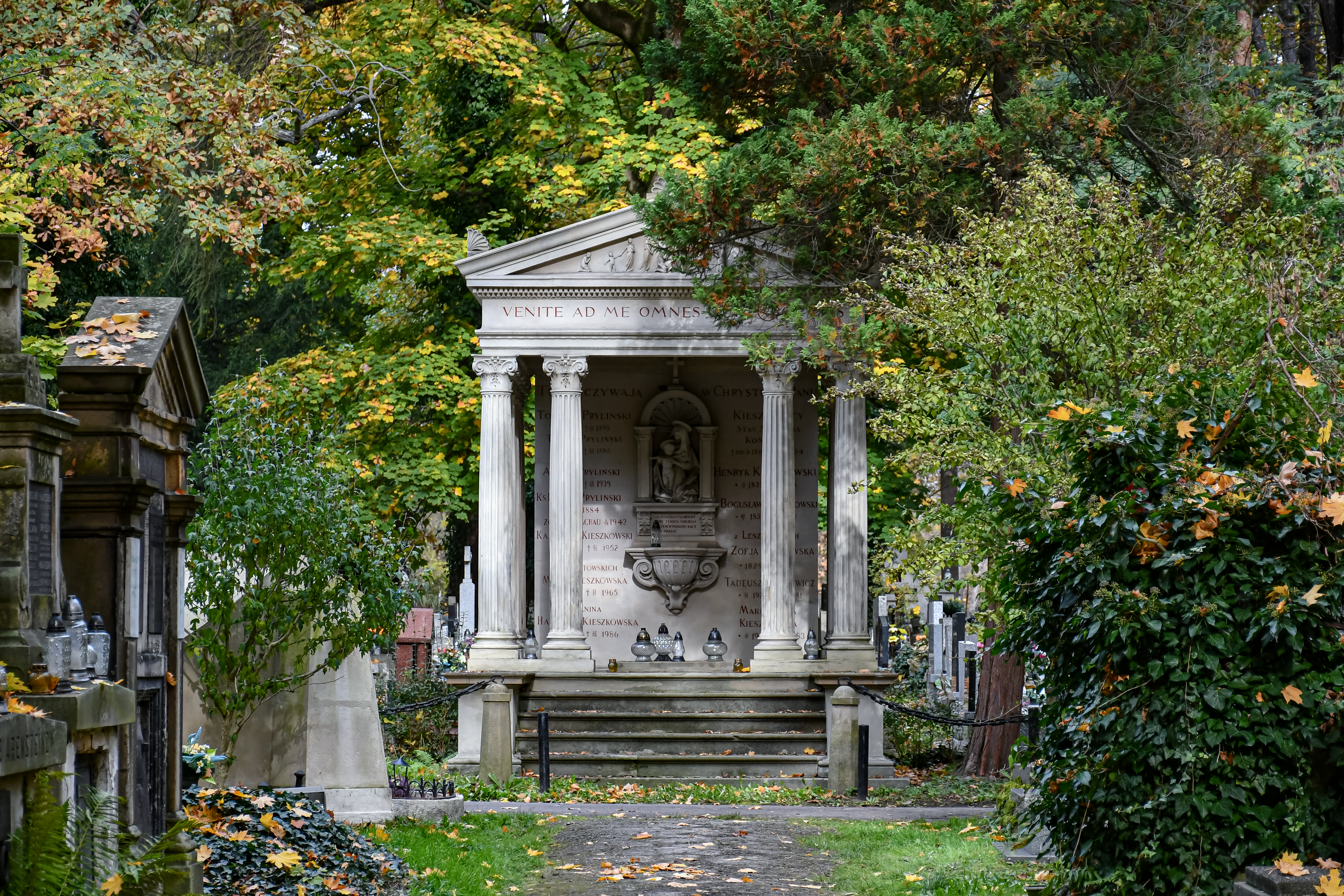
Tomb of architect Tomasz Pryliński

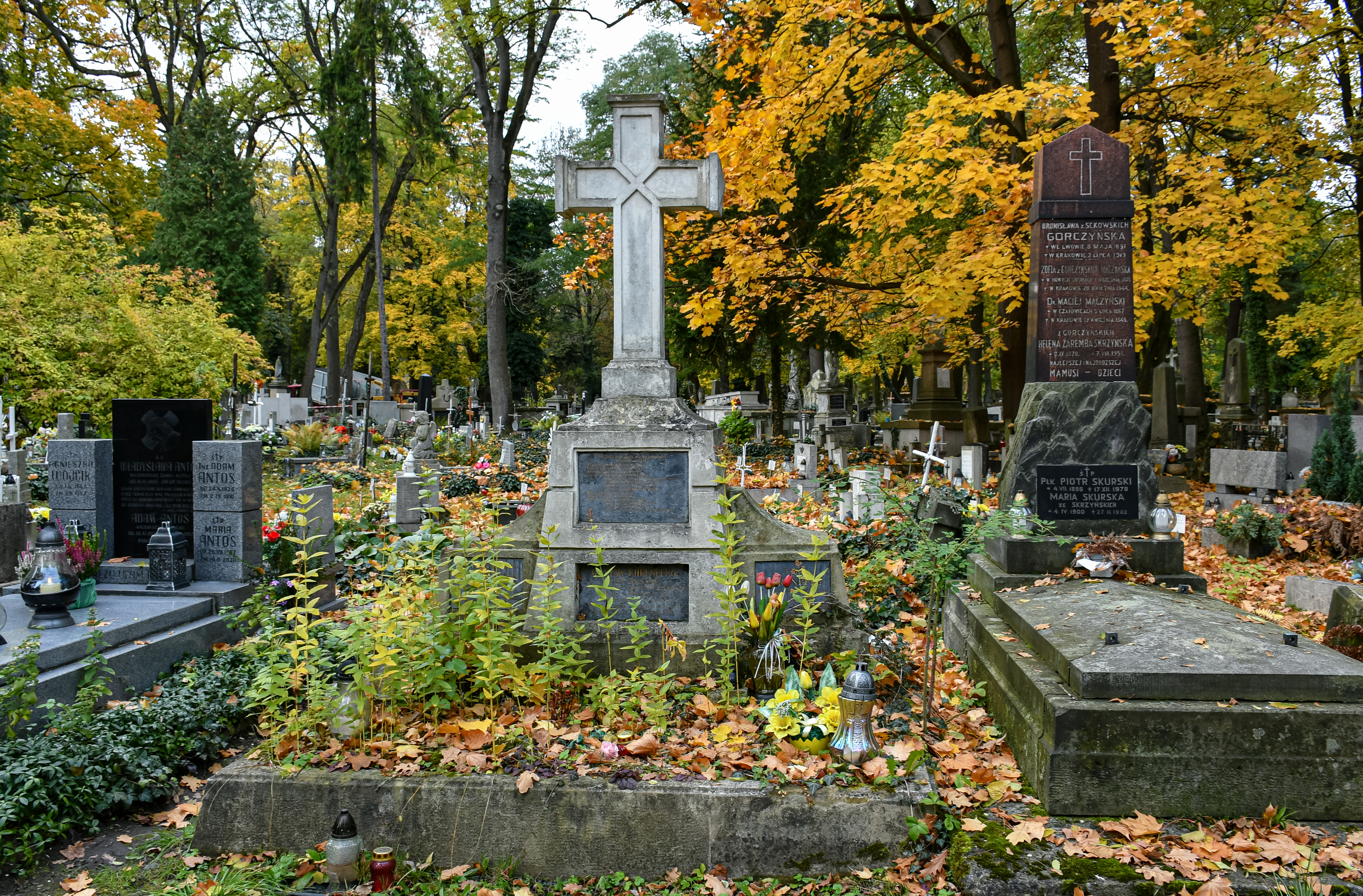
Tomb of Gustaw Ehrenberg
Polish poet, son of Tsar Alexander I of Russia

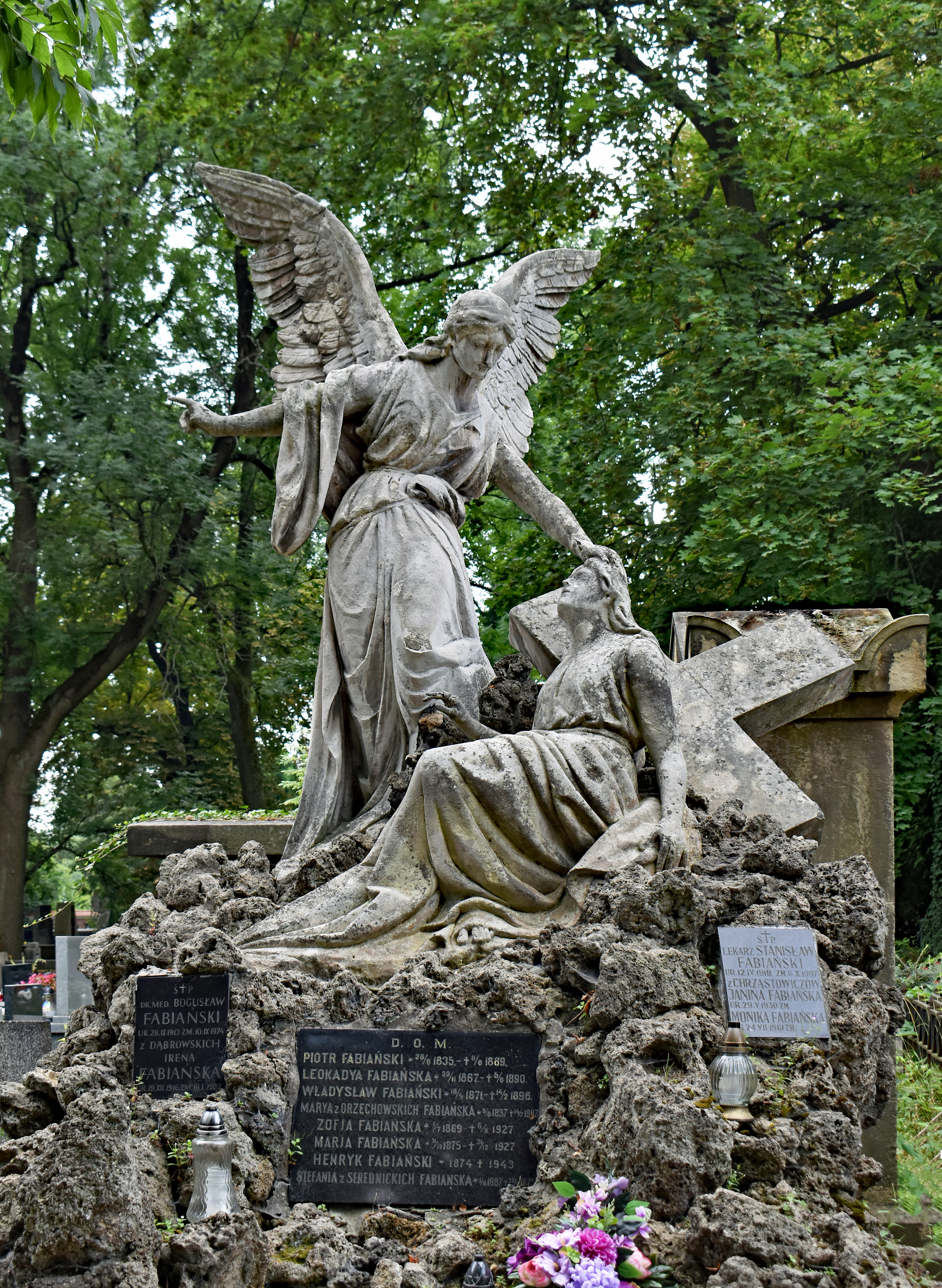
"Angel Waking the Dead"
Fabiański family tomb, 1893 by Michał Korpal

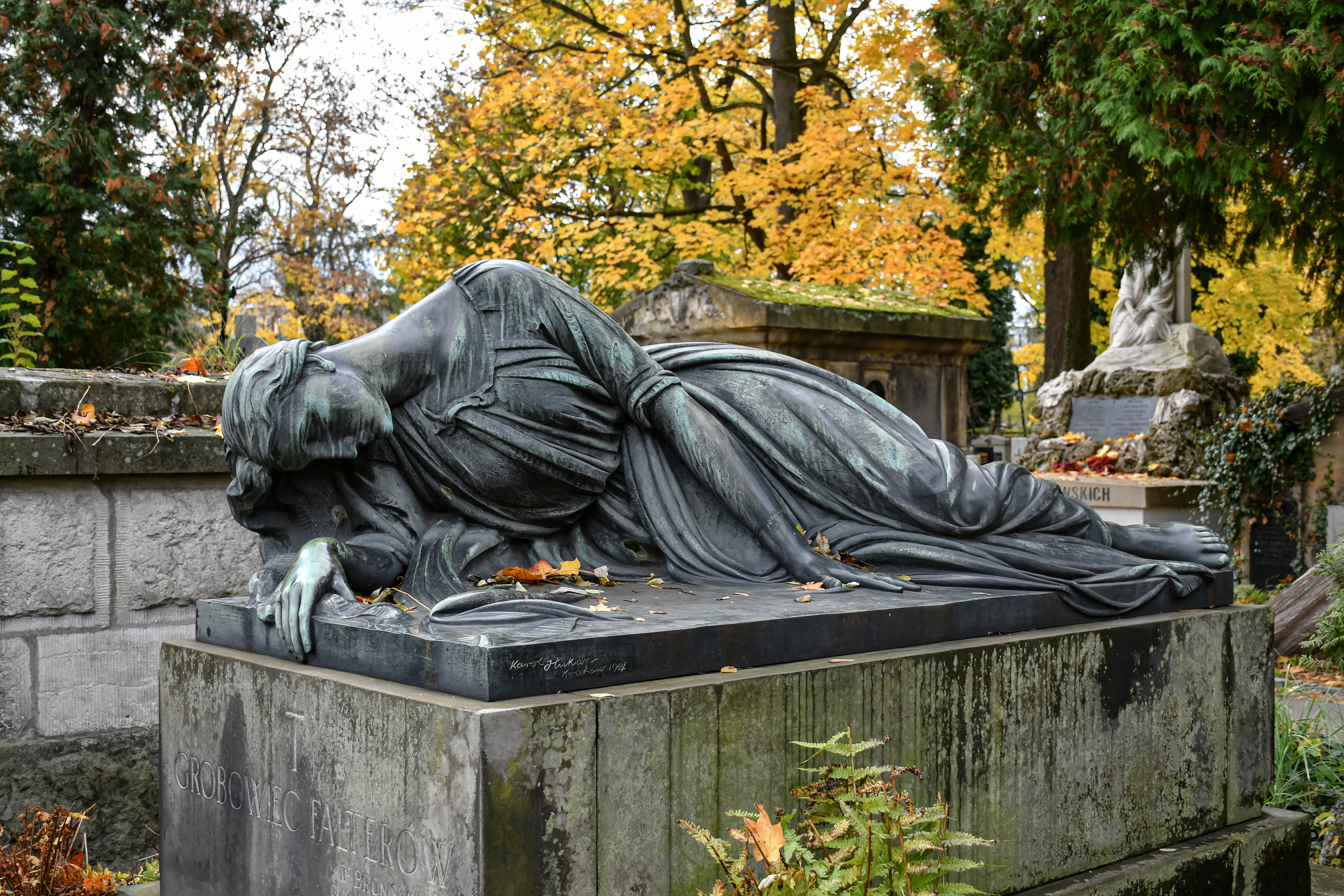
Tombstone sculpture,
1927 by Karol Hukan

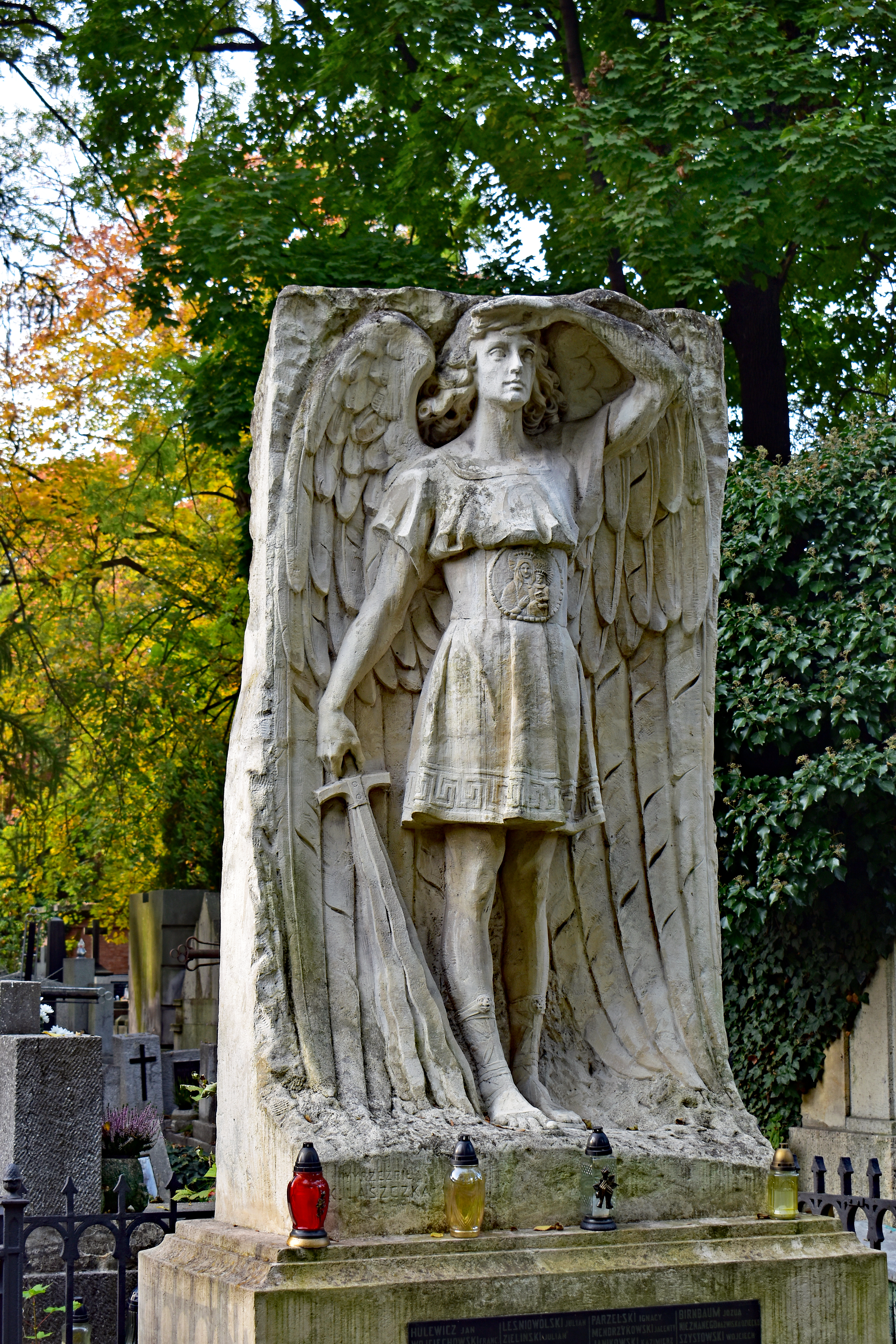
"Angel of Revenge" monument
1910 by Konstanty Laszczka

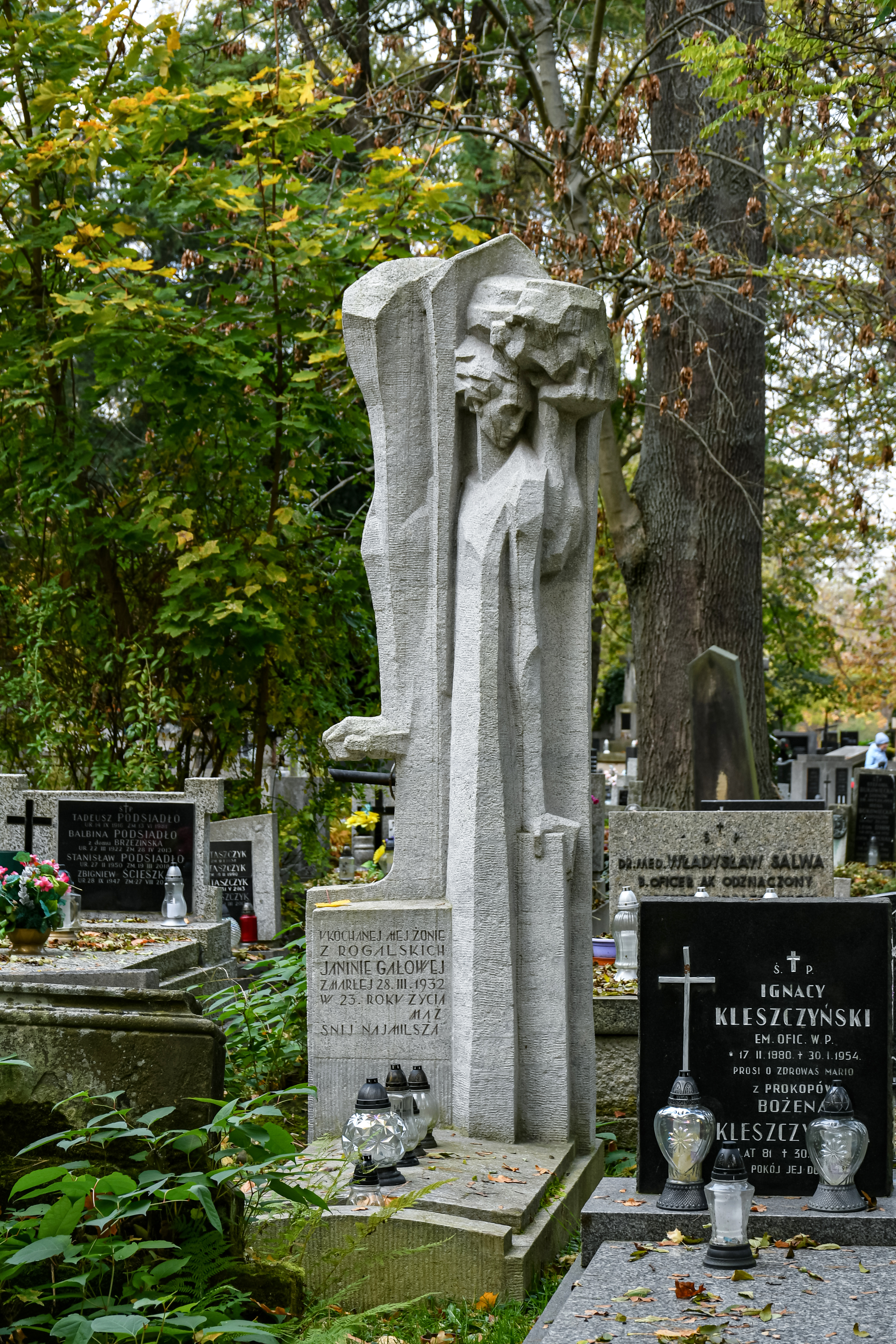
Tomb of Janina Gałowa,
1932 by Józef Gosławski

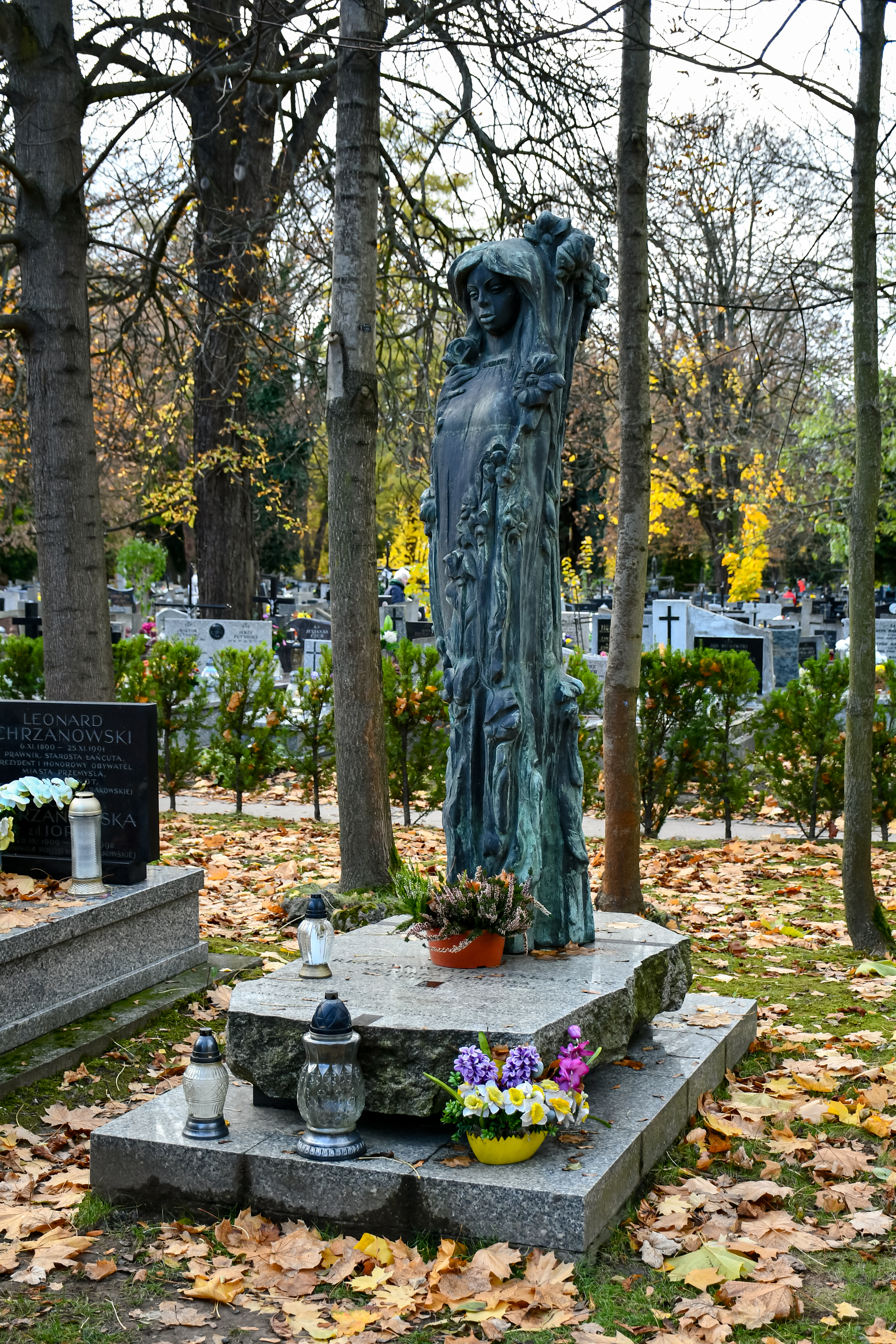
Tomb of Barbara Kwiatkowska-Lass,
sculpture by Marian Konieczny

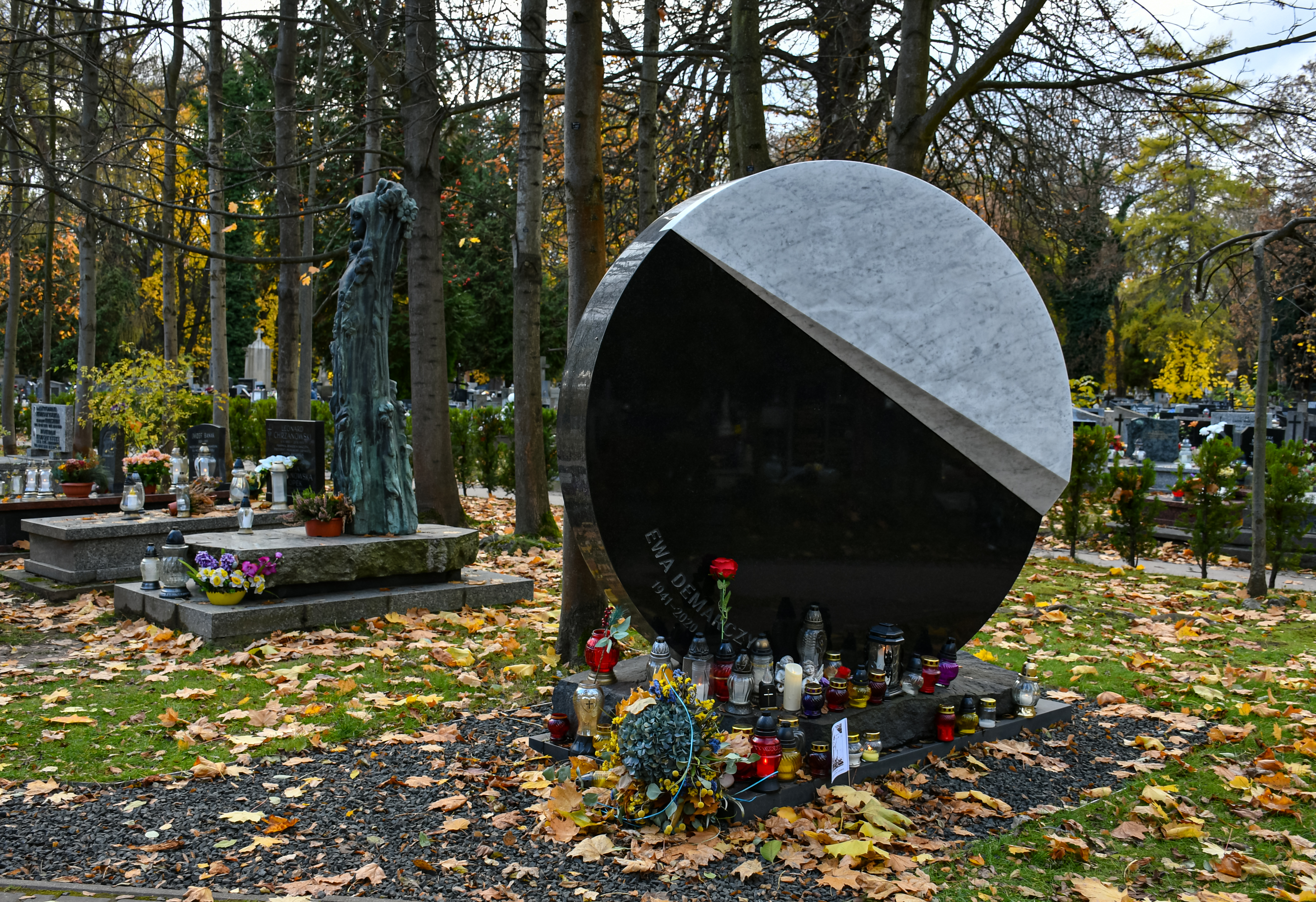
Tomb of Ewa Demarczyk

== See also ==
- Powązki Cemetery
- Powązki Military Cemetery
- Lychakiv Cemetery
- Rasos Cemetery

== Notes and references ==
- Internetowy lokalizator grobów Zarządu Cmentarzy Komunalnych w Krakowie
- Galeria zdjęć Cmentarza Rakowickiego
