= Julian Gutowski =

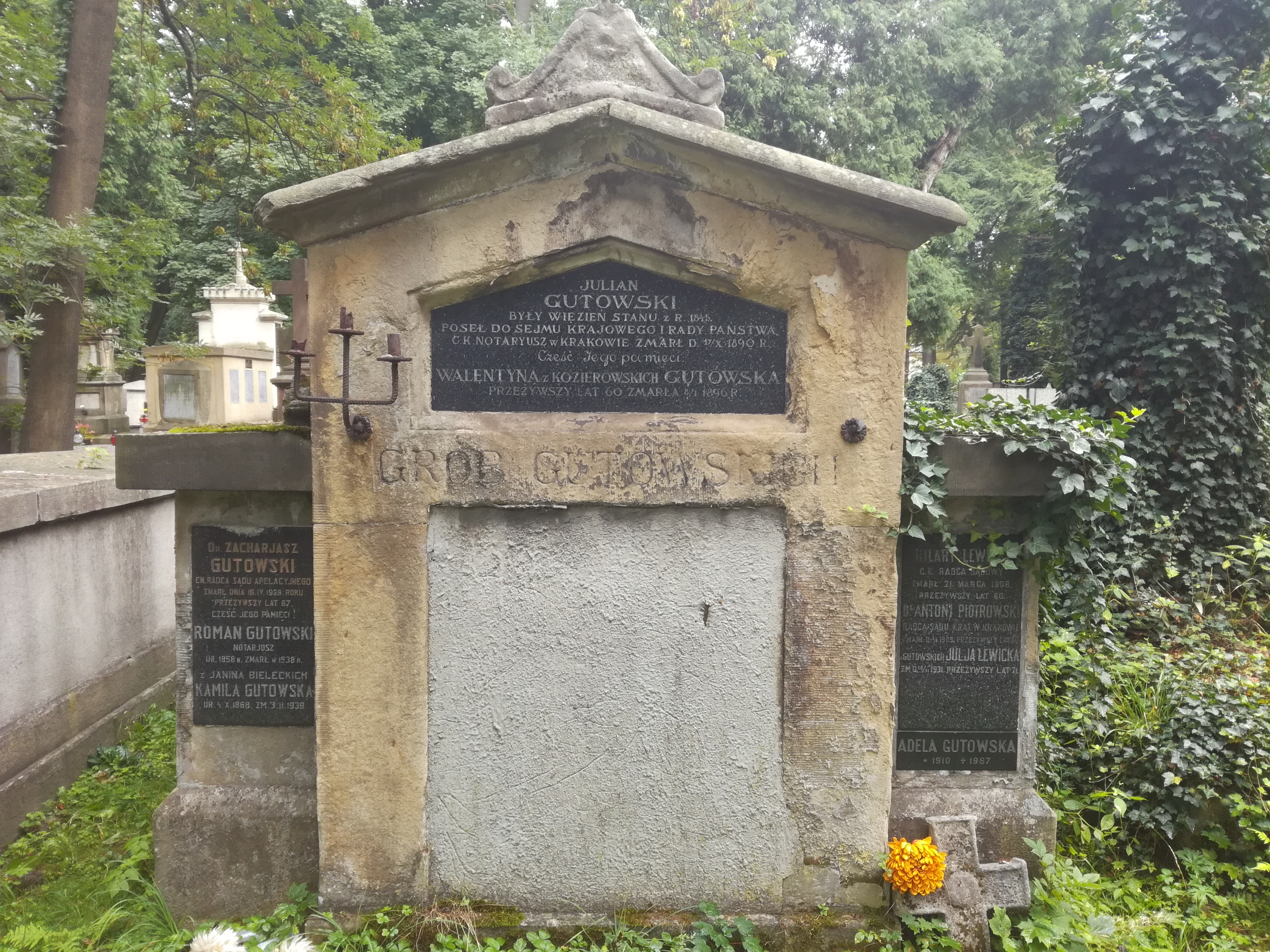
- Grave of Julian Gutowski at the Rakowicki Cemetery

Mayor of Nowy Sącz

Personal details
- Born: 1823 Kraków
- Died: 1890 (aged 66–67) Kraków
- Resting place: Rakowicki Cemetery

Julian Gutowski (1823–1890) was a member of the Diet of Galicia and Lodomeria and the Imperial Council (Austrian Parliament) in Vienna and the mayor of Nowy Sącz from 1867 to 1870.

== Life ==
Gutowski was born in Kraków. After studying law, he worked as a notary in Kraków. In 1867, he was elected as Mayor of Nowy Sącz, where he ran a notary office from 1860 to 1873. His term as Mayor lasted until 1870.

Gutowski died in Kraków on 17 October 1890, and was buried at the Rakowicki Cemetery.
