= Janina Oszast =

Polish biologist and resistance movement member (1908–1986)

- Born: 2 February 1908; Kraków, Grand Duchy of Kraków, Austria-Hungary
- Died: 7 October 1986 (aged 78); Kraków, Polish People's Republic
- Education: Jagiellonian University
- Occupations: Biologist, palaeobotanist, educator and resistance movement member
- Employer: Polish Academy of Sciences
- Organization(s): Polish Botanical Society; Union of Armed Struggle's Home Army (ZWZ-AK)
- Honours: Gold Cross of Merit with Swords; Cross of Valour; Virtuti Militari; Medal of Władysław Szafer

Janina Celina Oszast (2 February 1908 – 7 October 1986) was a Polish biologist, palaeobotanist and educator. She was also a member of the resistance movement Union of Armed Struggle's Home Army during World War II. In 1977, Oszast was among the first Polish palaeobotanists attempting biogeographic synthesis of Miocene land sediments.

In the aftermath of World War II, Oszast was imprisoned twice. She was released early on both occasions as part of an amnesty. She was arrested and imprisoned again in late 1952, but she was released on parole in December 1954. She subsequently served in the Polish Academy of Sciences from 1956 until her retirement in 1978.

== Early life ==
Oszast was born on 2 February 1908 in Kraków, Grand Duchy of Kraków, Austria-Hungary, to a working-class family. Her brother was the dermatologist Zbigniew Oszast.

== Education and early career ==
Oszast studied a master's degree at the Faculty of Philosophy and Natural Sciences of Jagiellonian University in Kraków.

Oszast was primarily interested in researching Quaternary era deposits. She was the first person in Poland to identify pollen from a range of herbaceous plants and the first to find pollen grains of Ephedra in glaciation period deposits.

== World War II resistance ==
During World War II, when Poland was occupied by Nazi Germany's General Government, Oszast was a member of the Polish resistance movement. She served as the head of the first department of the general organizational Bureau of Propaganda Information of the Kraków District of the Union of Armed Struggle's Home Army (ZWZ-AK). She also taught clandestine classes. Her code names were Janina or Jula.

Oszast was arrested in July 1945, but was released due to an amnesty in October 1945. By December, she had resumed her activities. Oszast was arrested again in October 1947 and was sentenced to six years in prison, but was again released due to an amnesty, on 17 October 1949. In December 1952, she was arrested again and sentenced to four years in prison, remaining incarcerated at Zakład Karny w Bydgoszcz-Fordonie [pl] in Bydgoszcz until her release on parole on 11 December 1954.

== Post war career ==
After World War II and her release from imprisonment, Oszast returned to her alma mater, Jagiellonian University, to resume her scientific career. Oszast published in journals including Acta Palaeobotanica and Geological Quarterly. She was a member of the Polish Botanical Society (PTB) [pl] and participated in national and international conferences with the organisation.

From 1956, Oszast was an assistant professor at the Department of Palaeobotany of the Institute of Botany in the Polish Academy of Sciences. She worked at the Polish Academy of Sciences until her retirement in 1978.

In 1977, Oszastwas among the first Polish palaeobotanists attempting biogeographic synthesis of Miocene land sediments, working with Leon Stuchlik [pl], a colleague at the Polish Academy of Sciences.

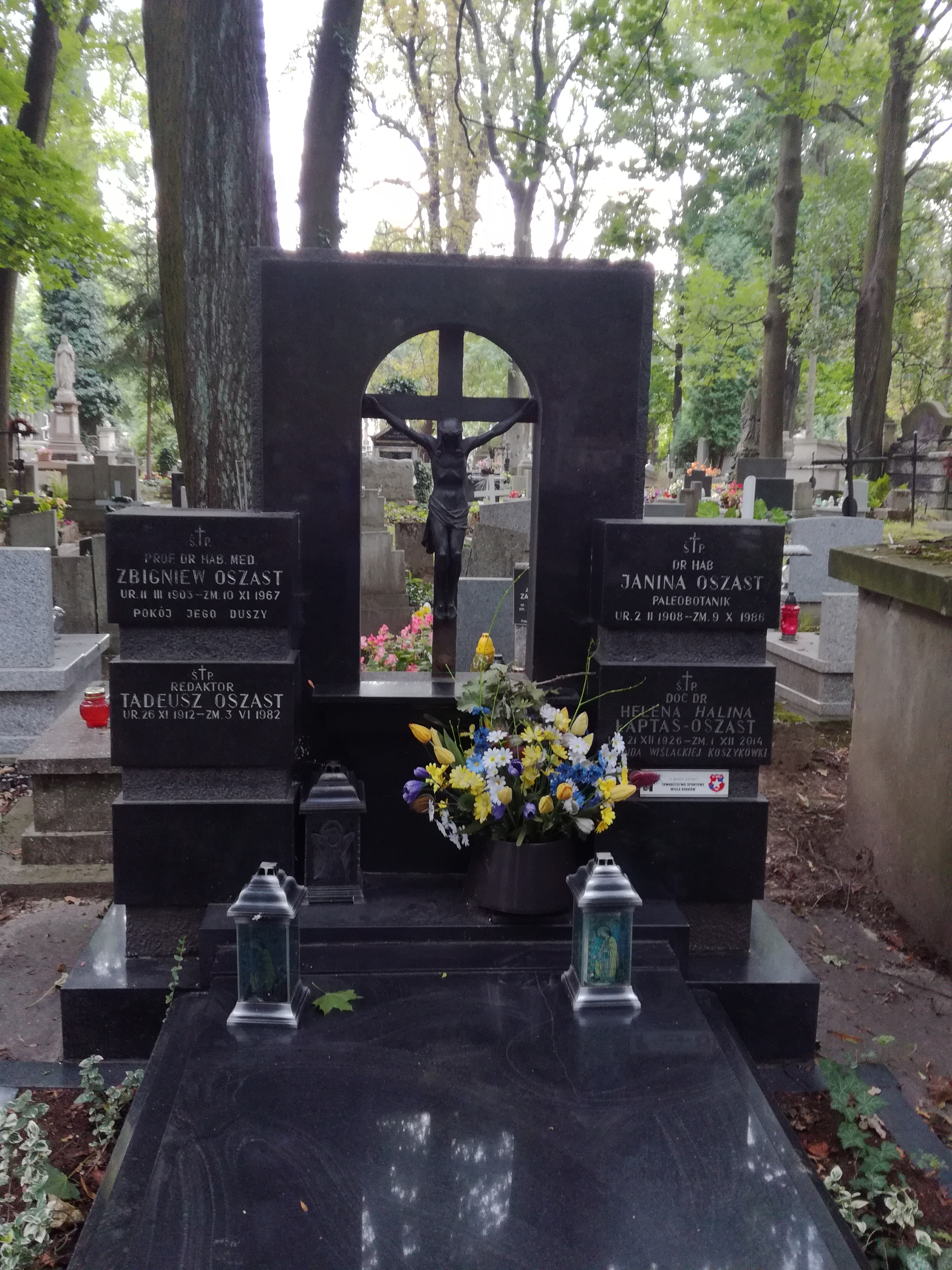
Grave in Rakowicki Cemetery

== Death ==
Oszast died on 7 October 1986 in Kraków, Polish People's Republic. She was buried in Rakowicki Cemetery.

== Awards ==
- Scientific Award of the Faculty of Biological Sciences of the Polish Academy of Sciences (1958 and 1977)
- Gold Badge of the Polish Teachers' Union (ZNP)
- Gold Cross of Merit with Swords
- Cross of Valour
- Virtuti Militari
- Medal of Władysław Szafer [pl] in the Jubilee Session (1986)
