= Konrad Krzyżanowski =

Ukrainian-born Polish illustrator and painter

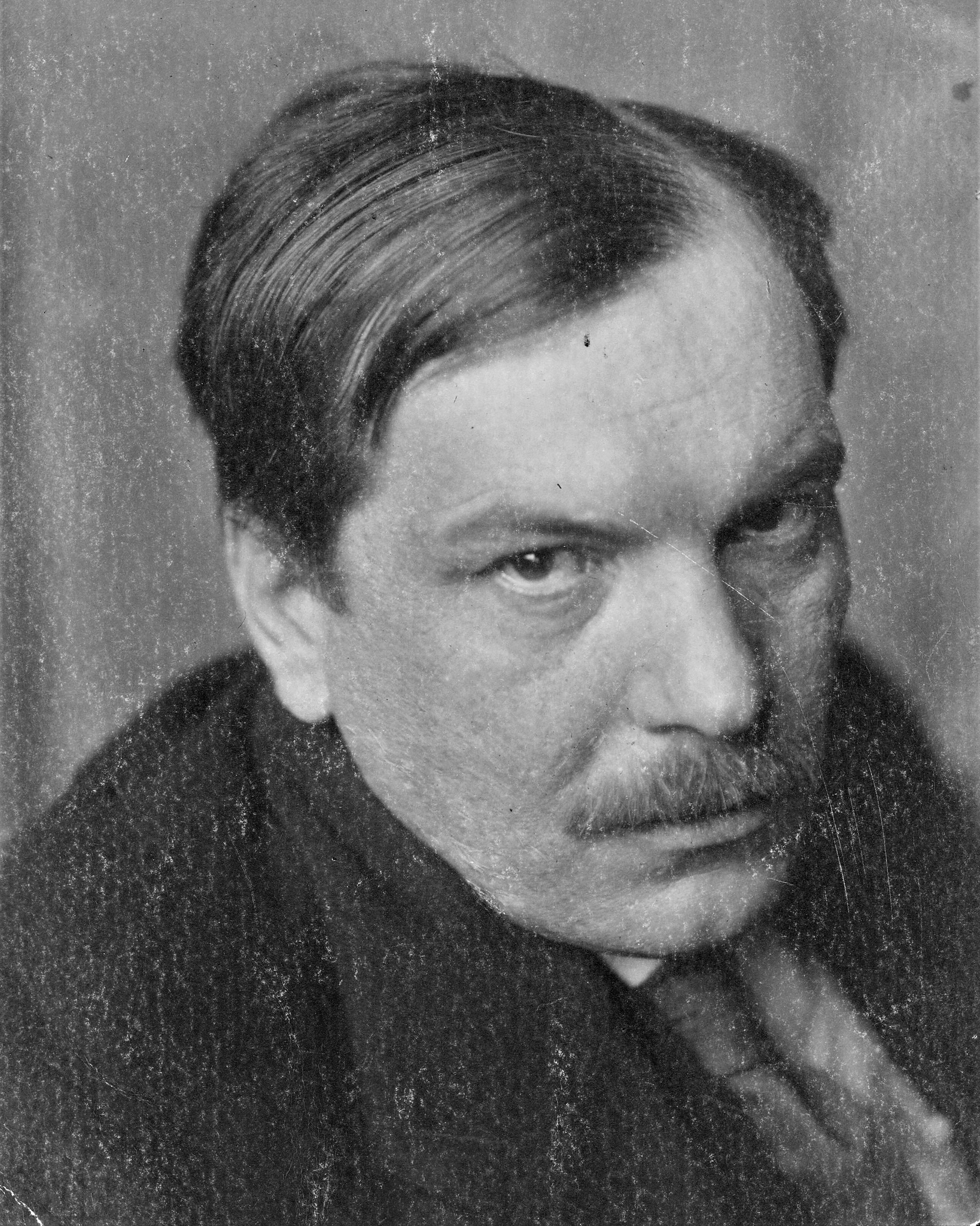
Krzyżanowski in 1919

Konrad Krzyżanowski (15 February 1872 – 25 May 1922) was a Polish illustrator and painter, primarily of portraits, who was considered to be an early exponent of Expressionism.

== Biography ==
He was born in Kremenchuk. He grew up in Kyiv and took his first art lessons at the Kyiv Drawing School with Mykola Murashko. This was followed by studies at the Imperial Academy of Arts in Saint Petersburg. He was not there long, however, when his distaste for the school's teaching methods developed into a conflict with the Rector and he was expelled.

In 1897, Krzyżanowski moved to Munich, where he took private lessons from Simon Hollósy. Three years later, he settled in Warsaw and, together with Kazimierz Stabrowski, established a painting school, which he ran for four years. From 1904 to 1909, he taught at the Academy of Fine Arts, where he often took his students to paint en plein aire in Lithuania and Finland. He also did illustrations for Chimera, a literary and artistic journal that was published from 1901 to 1907.

In 1906, Krzyżanowski married the artist Michalina Krzyżanowska (née Piotruszewski), a student at the academy. After her graduation in 1909, he resigned his position there. From 1912 to 1914 the couple lived in London and Paris, where Michalina studied with Maurice Denis at the Académie Ranson.

In 1914, they returned to Warsaw but, following the outbreak of World War I, went to live with Michalina's relatives in Volhynia. From 1917 to 1918, they lived in Kyiv, where Krzyżanowski taught at the "Polish School of Fine Arts".

After the creation of the Polish Second Republic, they returned to Warsaw and Krzyżanowski re-established his private art school. Among his best-known students were Tadeusz Pruszkowski, Ludwik Konarzewski and Krystyna Wróblewska.

Krzyżanowski died in Warsaw on 25 May 1922.

== Selected paintings ==
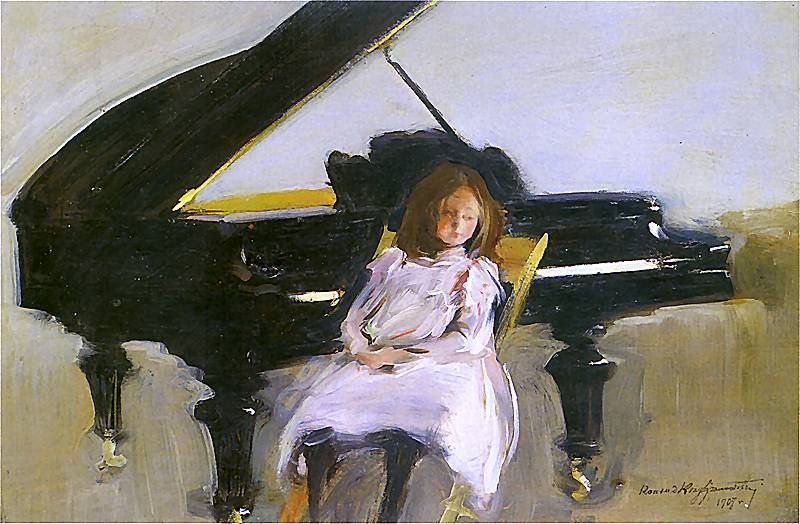
Girl at the Piano, 1907

Clouds in Finland, 1908

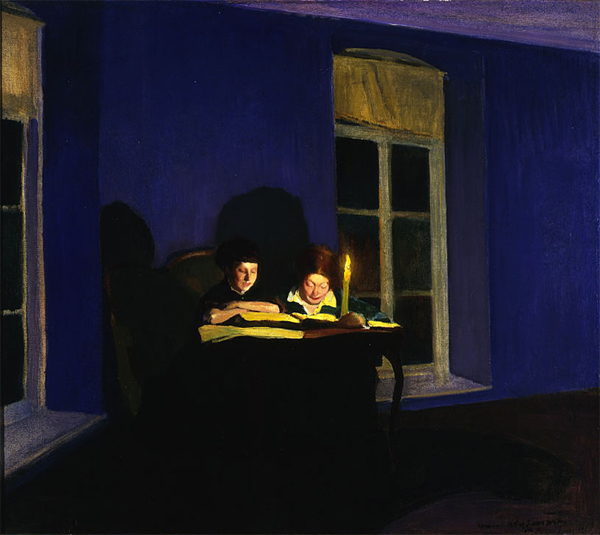
By Candlelight, 1914, National Museum, Warsaw

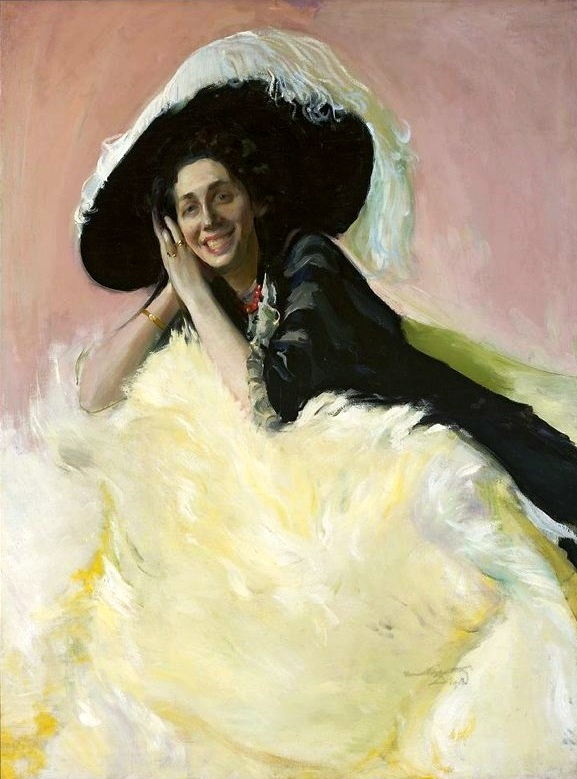
Janina Wilczyńska, 1912, National Museum, Warsaw

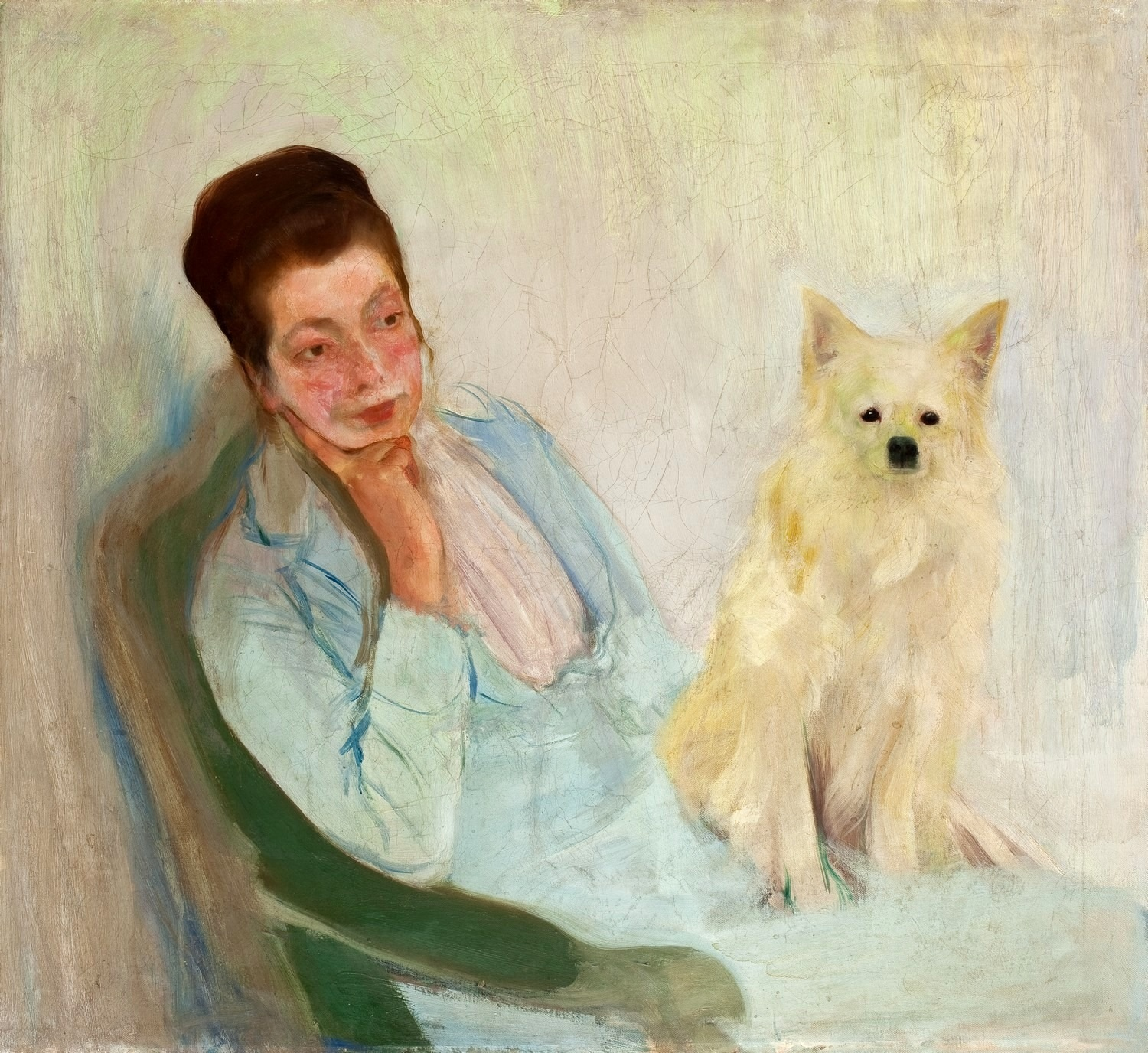
Wife with a dog, National Museum in Wrocław
