= Museum of Industry, Warsaw =

Coordinates: 52°13′56″N 20°59′29″E

- Muzeum Przemysłu w Warszawie
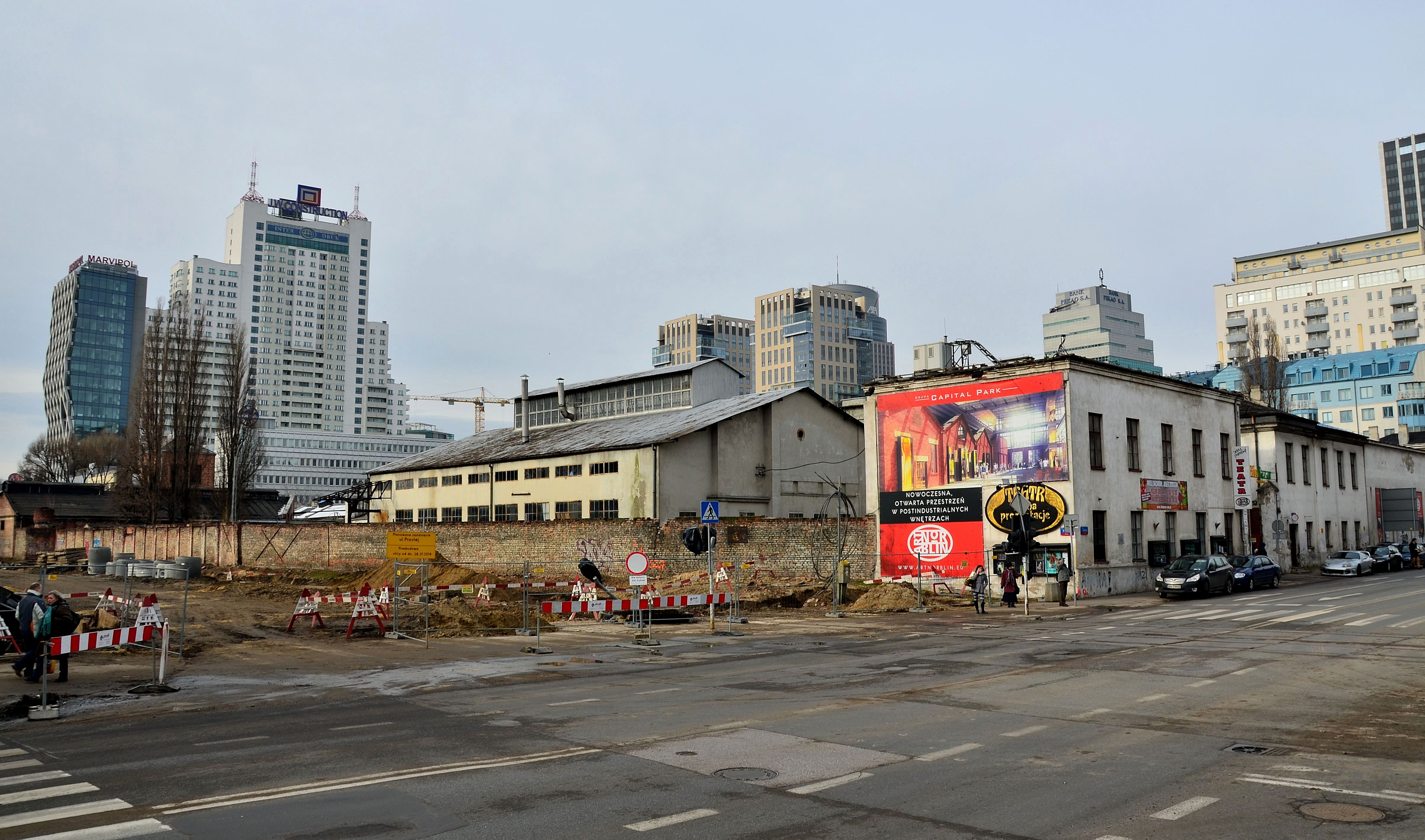
- Former Norblin factory, the last seat of the museum
- Established: 1982
- Dissolved: 2008; 18 years ago
- Location: Żelazna 51/53, 00-841 Warsaw, Poland
- Type: Technology museum

Muzeum Przemysłu w Warszawie was a museum in Warsaw, Poland. It was established in 1982 and closed in 2008.
