= Archbishop's Palace, Constanța =

Romanian building

Coordinates: 44.1717°N 28.6608°E

The Archbishop's Palace (Romanian: Palatul Arhiepiscopiei Tomisului) is a building located at 23 Arhiepiscopiei Street, Constanța, Romania. It is the official residence of the Romanian Orthodox Archbishop of Tomis.

The palace was built upon the initiative of Bishop Ilarie Teodorescu. In 1924, architect Ion D. Enescu drew up the plans, which specified imposing dimensions, two recessed facades with two floors, an orientation parallel to the adjacent cathedral and arched windows of different styles on three levels. The cornerstone was laid in May 1925; among those present were Patriarch Miron Cristea and ministers Constantin Angelescu and Alexandru Lapedatu. The initial cost was 2 million lei, paid by the Religious Affairs and Arts Ministry. Bishop Ilarie died in autumn 1925; his successor Gherontie Nicolau oversaw completion. Construction was beset by various difficulties, prompting one of the chief participants to commit suicide in late 1926.

The palace was largely complete by mid-1927, but was only finalized and inaugurated in early 1934. Bishop Gherontie opened a wax candle factory in the basement in 1939. The building was damaged by Soviet bombing during World War II and repaired in 1957-1958. Under the communist regime, from 1957 to 1977, it housed the Constanța History and Archaeology Museum. It then hosted the Constanța County Library until 1998, when it was restored to the archdiocese. The top floor of the building was destroyed by fire in 2022.

The palace is listed as a historic monument by Romania's Ministry of Culture and Religious Affairs.
