= Teodosie Petrescu =

Romanian cleric (born 1955)

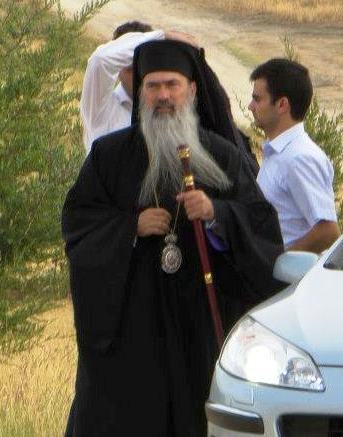
- Church: Romanian Orthodox Church
- Archdiocese: Tomis
- Elected: 21 February 2001
- Installed: 8 April 2001

Personal details
- Born: Macedon Porcu; 12 December 1955 (age 70) Vatra Dornei, Suceava Region, Romanian People's Republic
- Denomination: Eastern Orthodoxy
- Occupation: Archbishop
- Education: University of Bucharest

Teodosie Petrescu (Romanian pronunciation: [te.oˈdosi.e peˈtresku]; born 12 December 1955; birth name: Macedon Porcu [mat͡ʃeˈdon]) is a Romanian cleric who has been the Archbishop of Tomis since 2001.

== Biography ==
=== Early life ===
Born in Vatra Dornei, Suceava County, Teodosie was the 17th child of the family of Procopie and Elisabeta Porcu. He followed the Neamț Monastery's Theological Seminary between 1970 and 1975, after which he became, in 1976, a student of theology at the University of Bucharest, which he graduated in 1980.

After graduation, Petrescu became a teaching assistant at the Theological Institute of Bucharest.

=== Monk and bishop ===
He was tonsured a monk in December 1990 at the Crasna Monastery, Prahova County, receiving the name Teodosie. On 22 March 1994, the Holy Synod raised him to become a bishop and he became the vicar of the Archdiocese of Bucharest, receiving the name of Snagoveanul ("of Snagov"), being ordinated on 3 April 1994 at the Saint Spyridon the New Church of Bucharest.

On 21 February 2001, the Church Electoral College summoned by Patriarch Teoctist in Bucharest voted bishop Teodosie Petrescu to become the Archbishop of Tomis, being enthroned at the Cathedral of Saints Peter and Paul of Constanța on 8 April 2001, Palm Sunday.

Teodosie became a Doctor of Theology in July 1999 and has been a professor since April 2002. On 17 September 2002, he was elected Dean of the Orthodox Theology Faculty of Ovidius University, Constanța, being also re-elected in 2004 and 2008.

== Awards ==
In December 2002, Teodosie Petrescu was awarded the Order of the Star of Romania in the rank of Knight by President Ion Iliescu.
