= Constanța History and Archaeology Museum =

Coordinates: 44.1738°N 28.6581°E

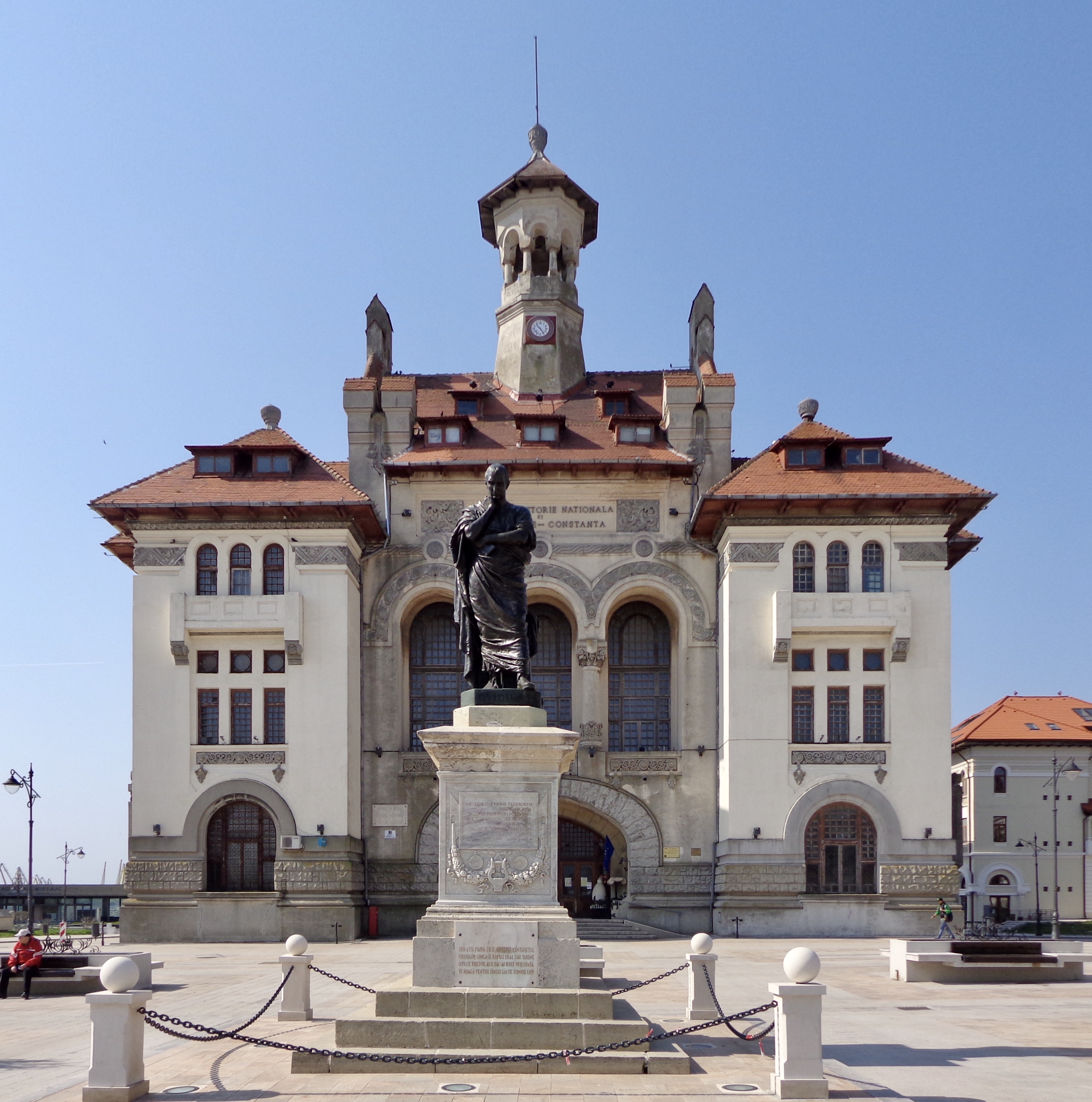
- The Romanian Revival façade of the museum, with the Statue of Ovid in front of it
- Established: 1911
- Location: Piața Ovidiu 12, Constanța, Romania
- Type: History museum and historic site
- Website: www.minac.ro

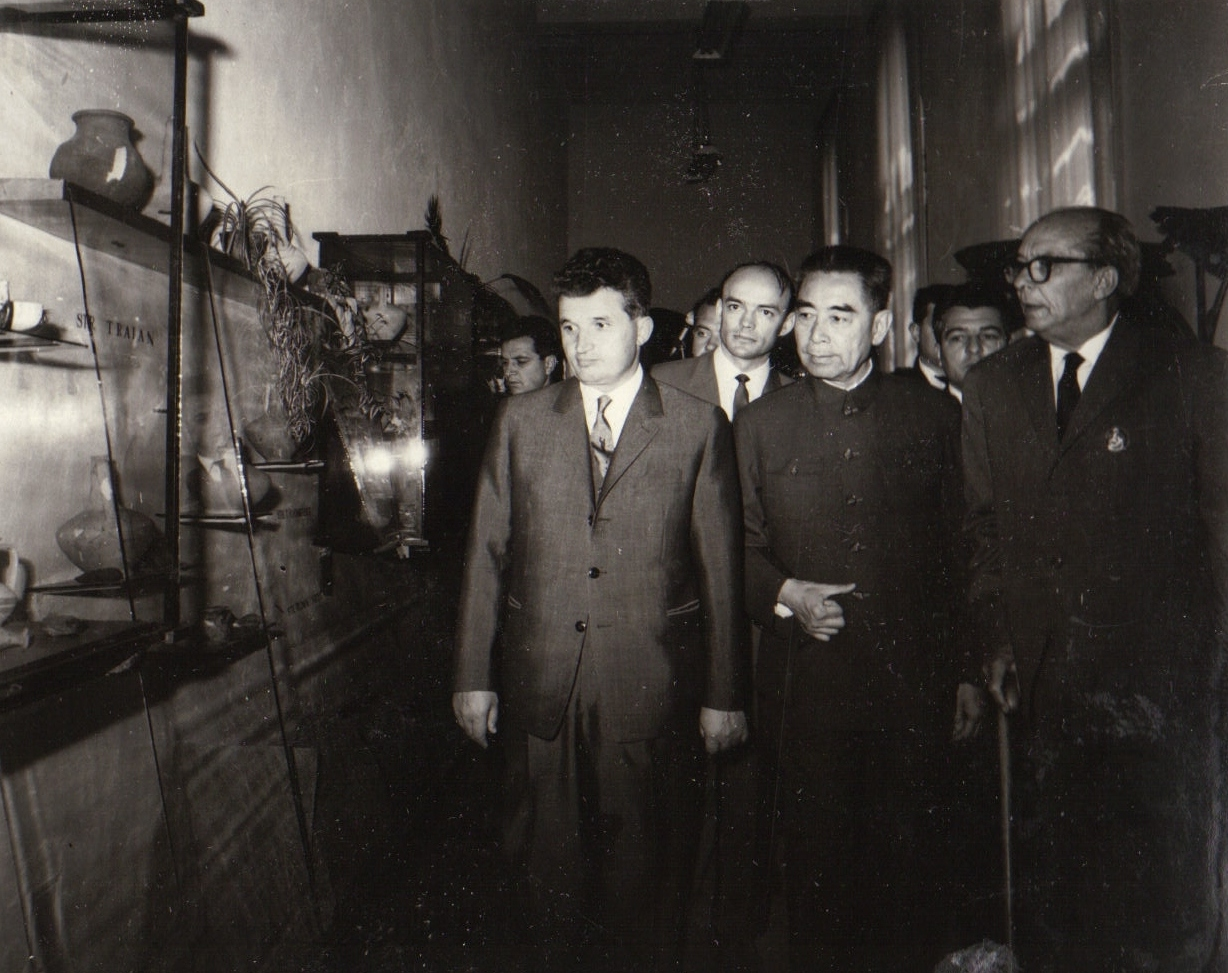
Nicolae Ceaușescu and Zhou Enlai visit the museum in 1966

The Constanța History and Archaeology Museum (Romanian: Muzeul de Istorie Națională și Arheologie) is a museum located at 12 Piața Ovidiu, Constanța, Romania.

== History ==
As early as 1878, the year when the Romanian Old Kingdom acquired Northern Dobruja, its first prefect, Remus Opreanu, proposed creating an archaeology museum. This was soon done, in Opreanu's office. After the prefecture building burned down in 1882, the surviving pieces were housed in the public garden pavilion. By 1911, the surviving collection was in storage at a local high school. That year, Vasile Pârvan, head of the National Museum of Antiquities, wrote a report calling for a permanent museum in Constanța; this is considered its founding charter. From 1912, the museum was located in a kiosk in the city park. It was moved into a wing of the city hall in 1928, opening two years later. The city hall building, now that of the museum, was built between 1912 and 1921, and designed by Victor Ștefănescu in the Romanian National Style.

By the 1930s, the museum was becoming crowded; donations, acquisitions and excavations were constantly expanding the collection. In 1937, the archaeology section held 272 items. In 1957, the museum was reorganized under the leadership of Vasile Canarache and moved into a new building, now the Archbishop's Palace. It featured exhibit space, a restoration laboratory, a specialized library and modern equipment. Eventually, this space too became insufficient, as the history section stopped with the Middle Ages. In 1977, the museum moved into the entire city hall building.

== Collection ==
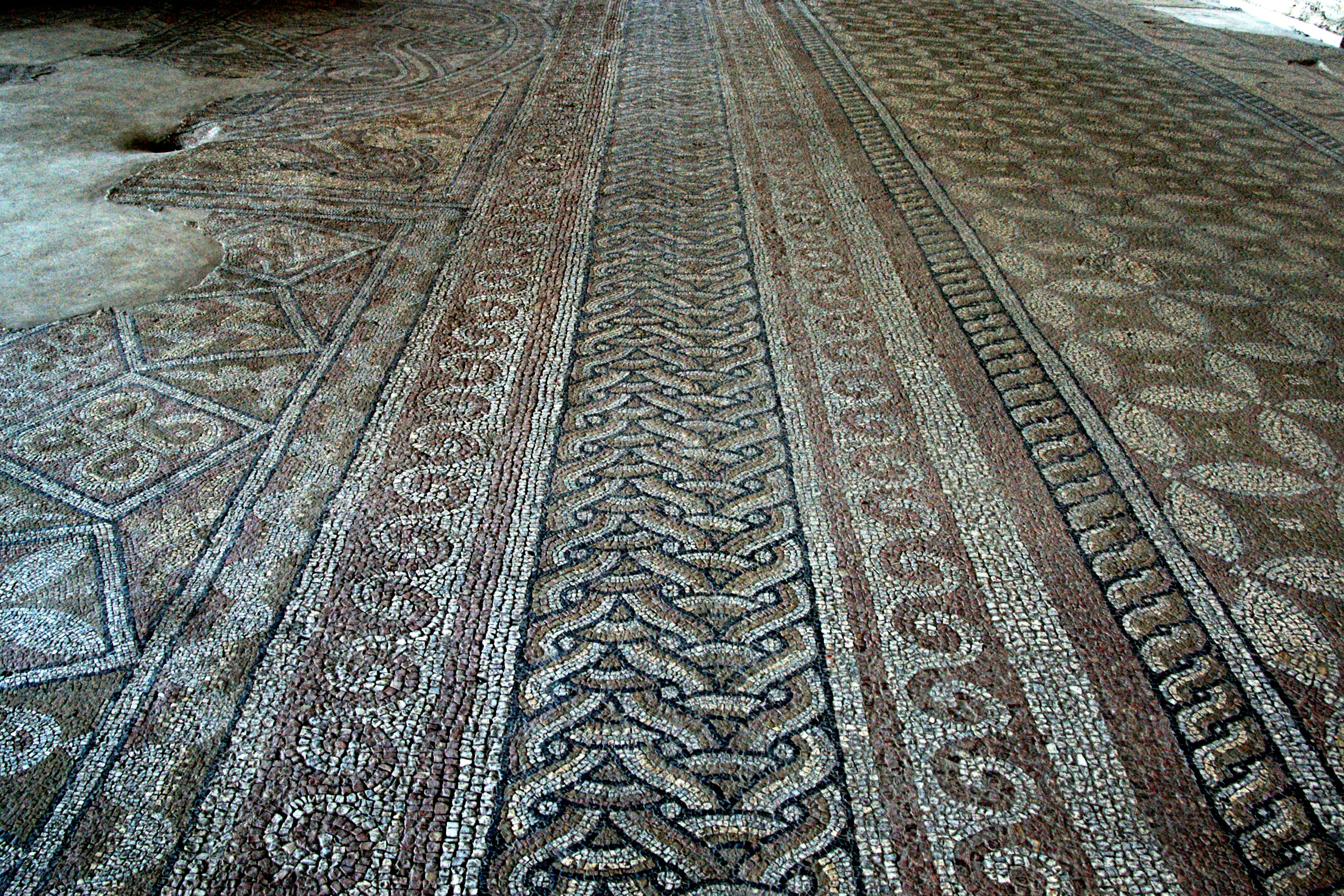
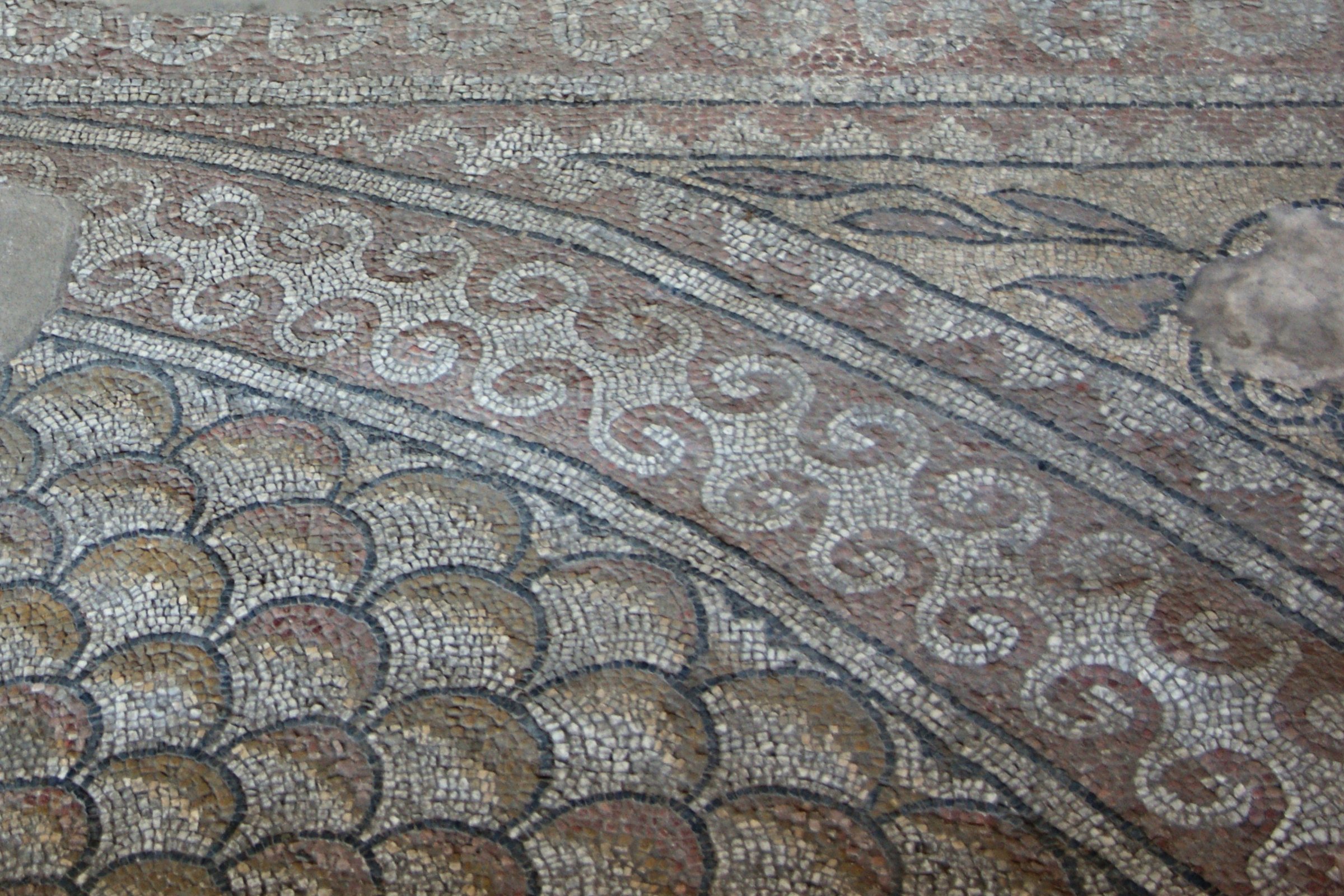
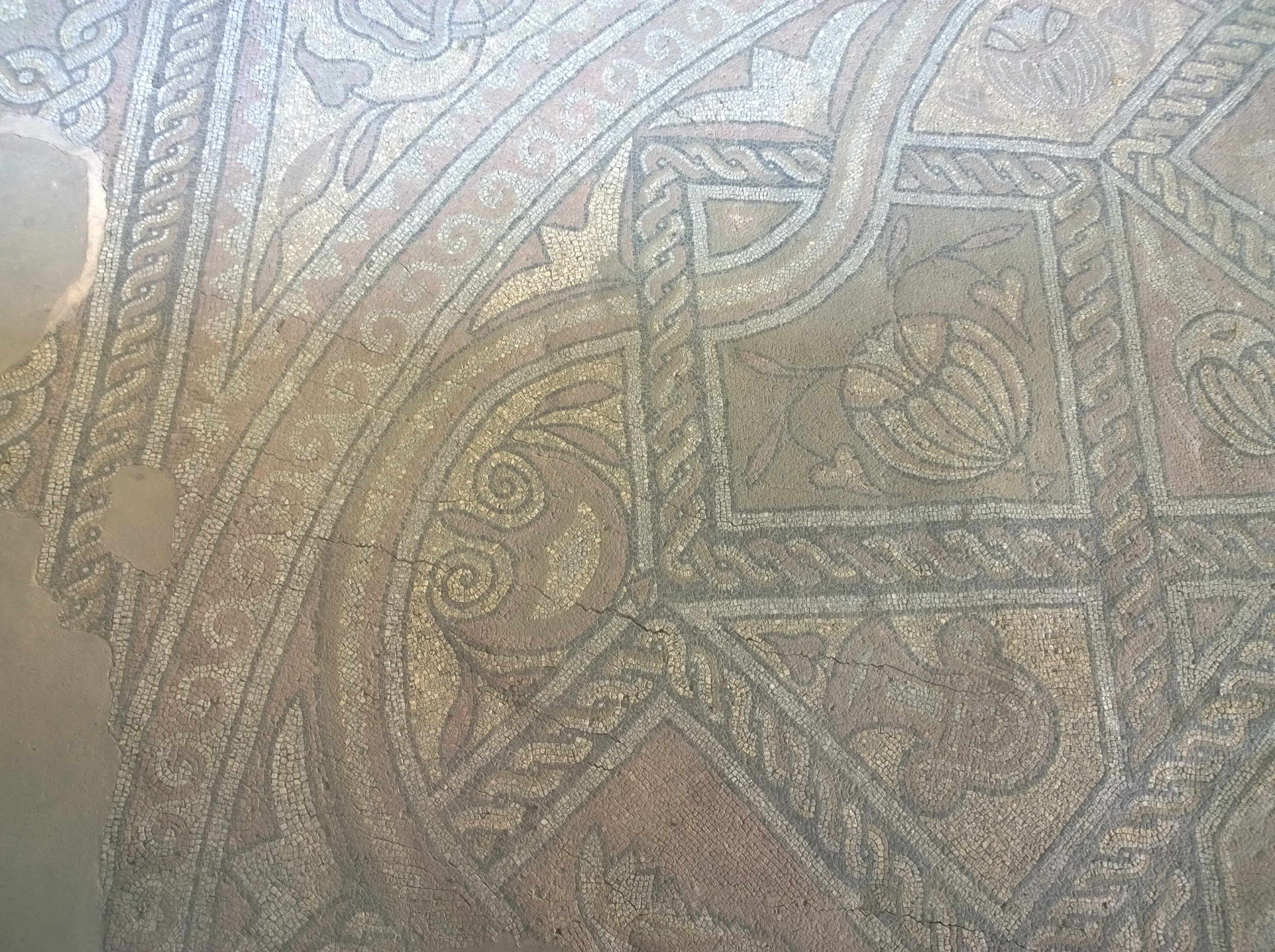
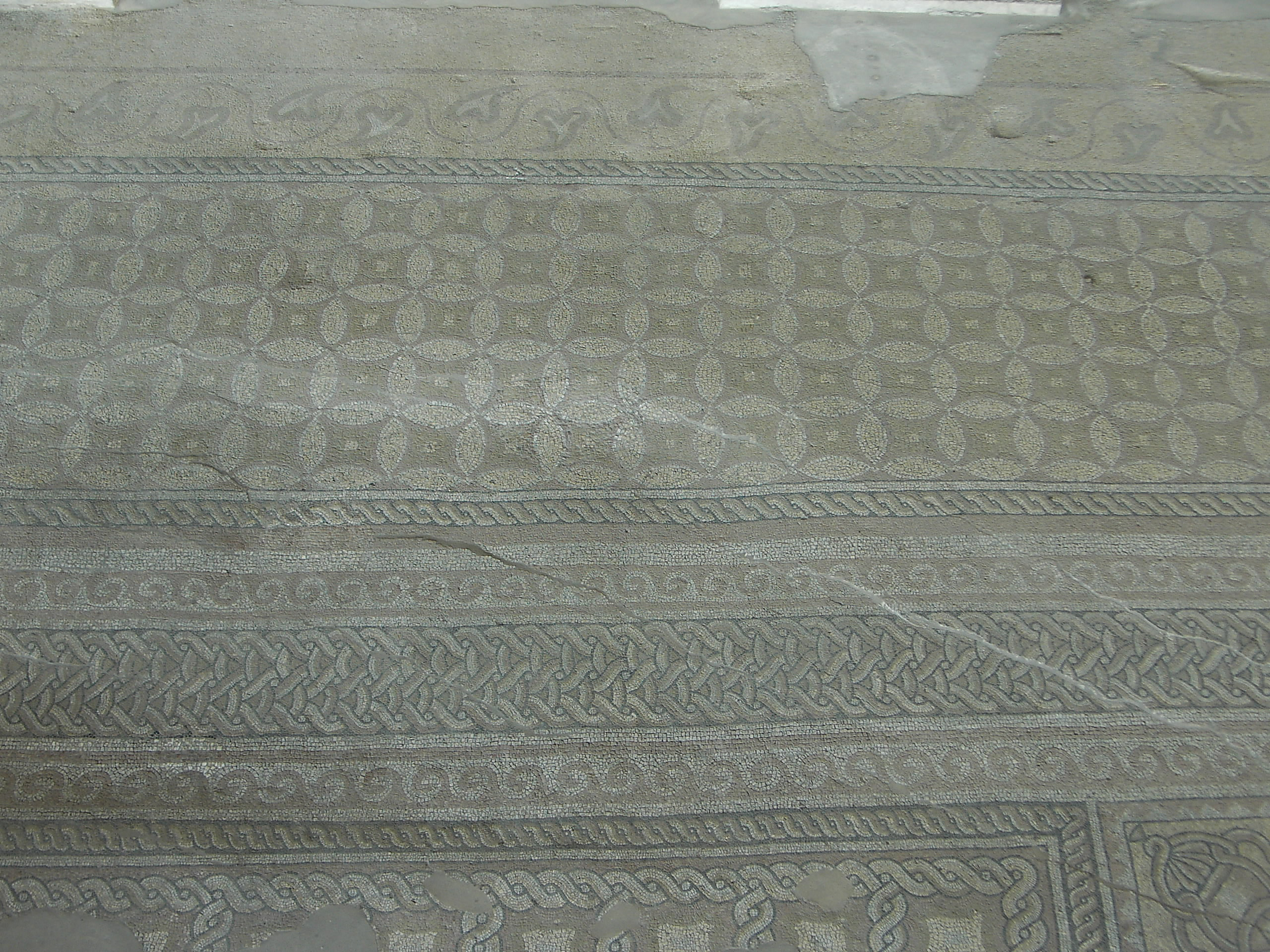
Details of the Roman edifice with mosaic

The ground floor of the museum features two rooms of archaeological finds. The middle floor describes the ancient and medieval history of Dobruja. The highest floor is dedicated to modern history, as well as thematic expositions. The archaeological collection includes 24 sculptures (statues and bas reliefs) found in 1962 while foundations were being dug for an apartment building. That very summer, 300,000 visitors saw the new discovery, which has remained a matter of scientific interest. The centerpiece is a glycon dating to the 2nd century AD. Sculptures of Tyche, the protecting divinity of Tomis (ancient Constanța), and of Pontus, god of the Black Sea, date to the same period. A bust of Isis and a relief showing a Thracian horseman are from the 3rd century.

Other items include an 18th-century bronze brooch found at Vadu in 1989; a 2nd or 3rd-century gold and glass necklace from Mangalia (Callatis), found 1985; a gold and stone medallion from the 1962 excavation; a 3rd or 4th-century gold earring with goat pendant from Vama Veche; a 2nd-century gold ring with gem inset from Tomis; and a 4th to 6th-century gold cross with gem inset found at Mangalia in 1983. Finally, there is a 4th-century hypogeum style tomb discovered in Constanța in 1988. It is noted for the artistic value of the painted interior, featuring elements both of Ancient Greek religion and Christianity.

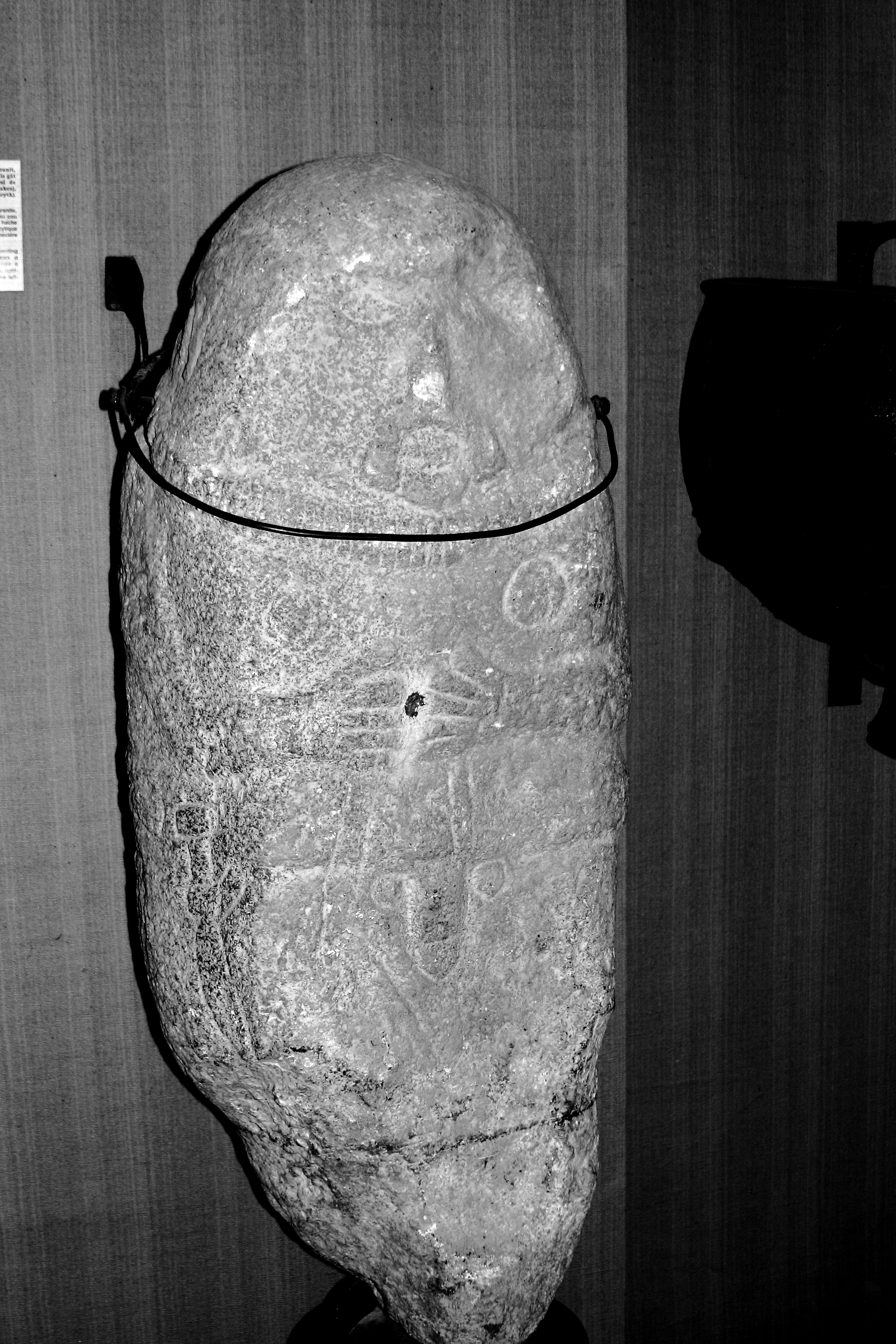
Scythian statue, first Iron Age, stone; from Sibioara (Constanța County, Romania)

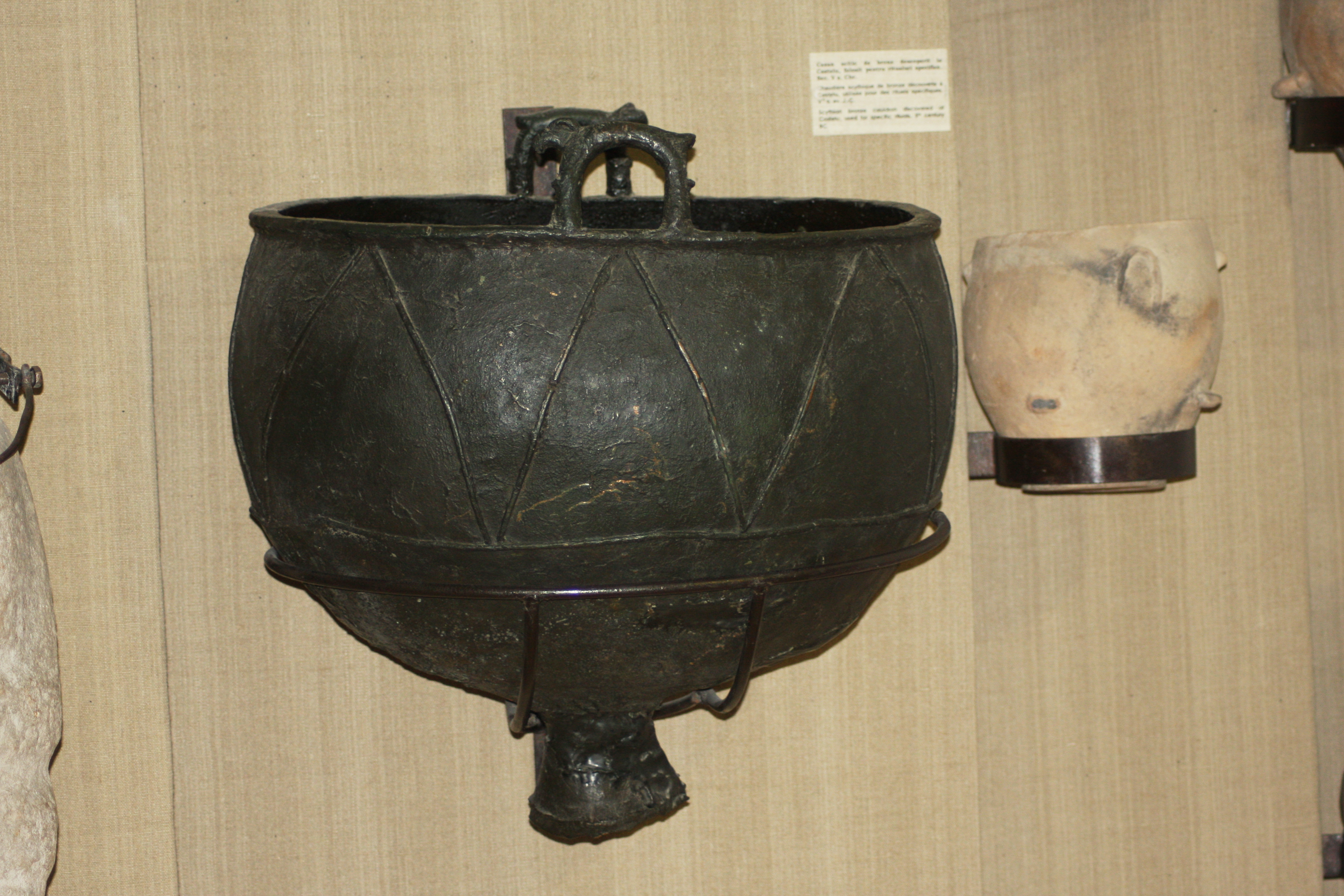
Scythian bowl, 5th-4th century BC, bronze; from Castelu (near Medgidia, Constanța County)

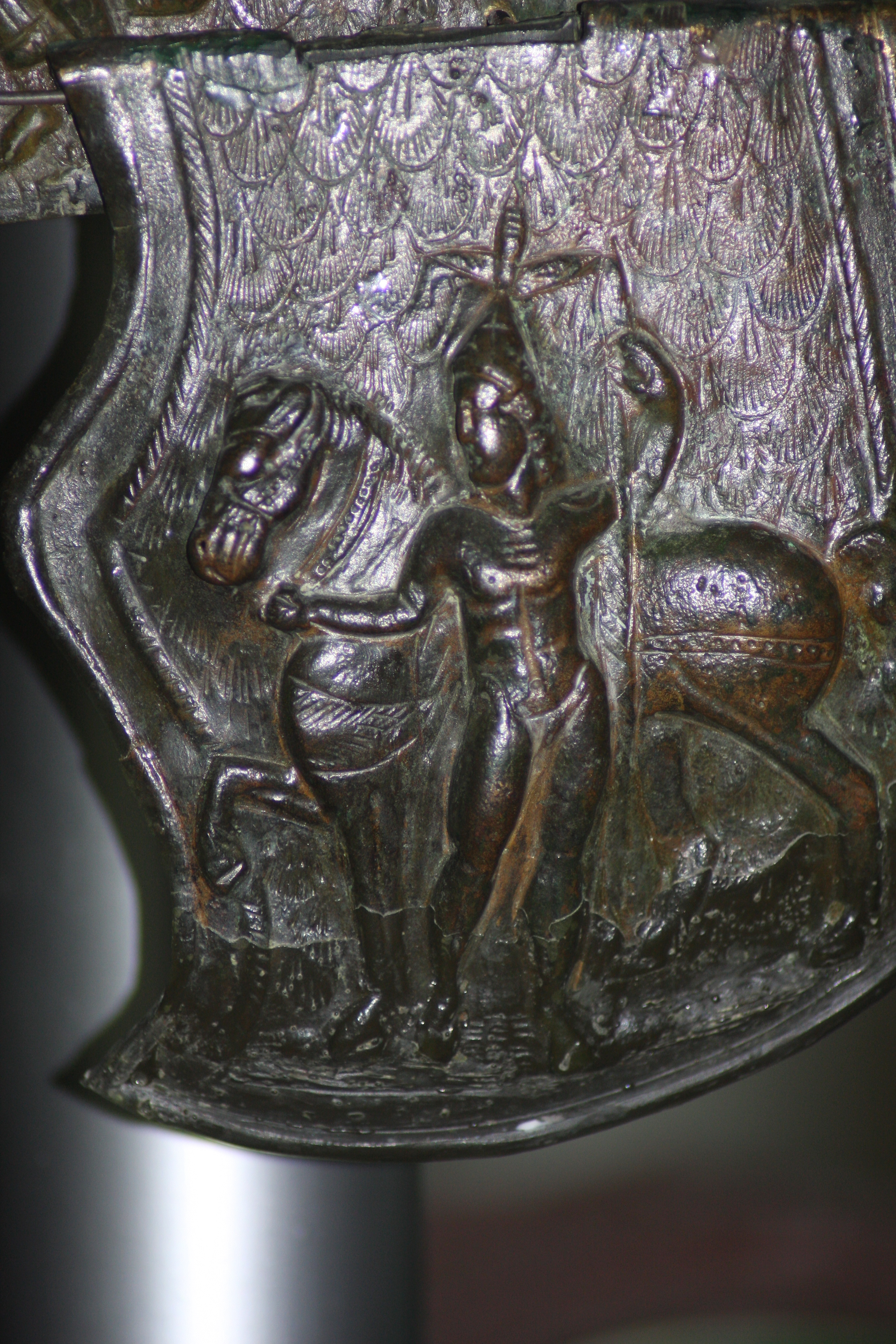
Fragment of parade helmet earmuff, 1st century AD, bronze; from Ostrov

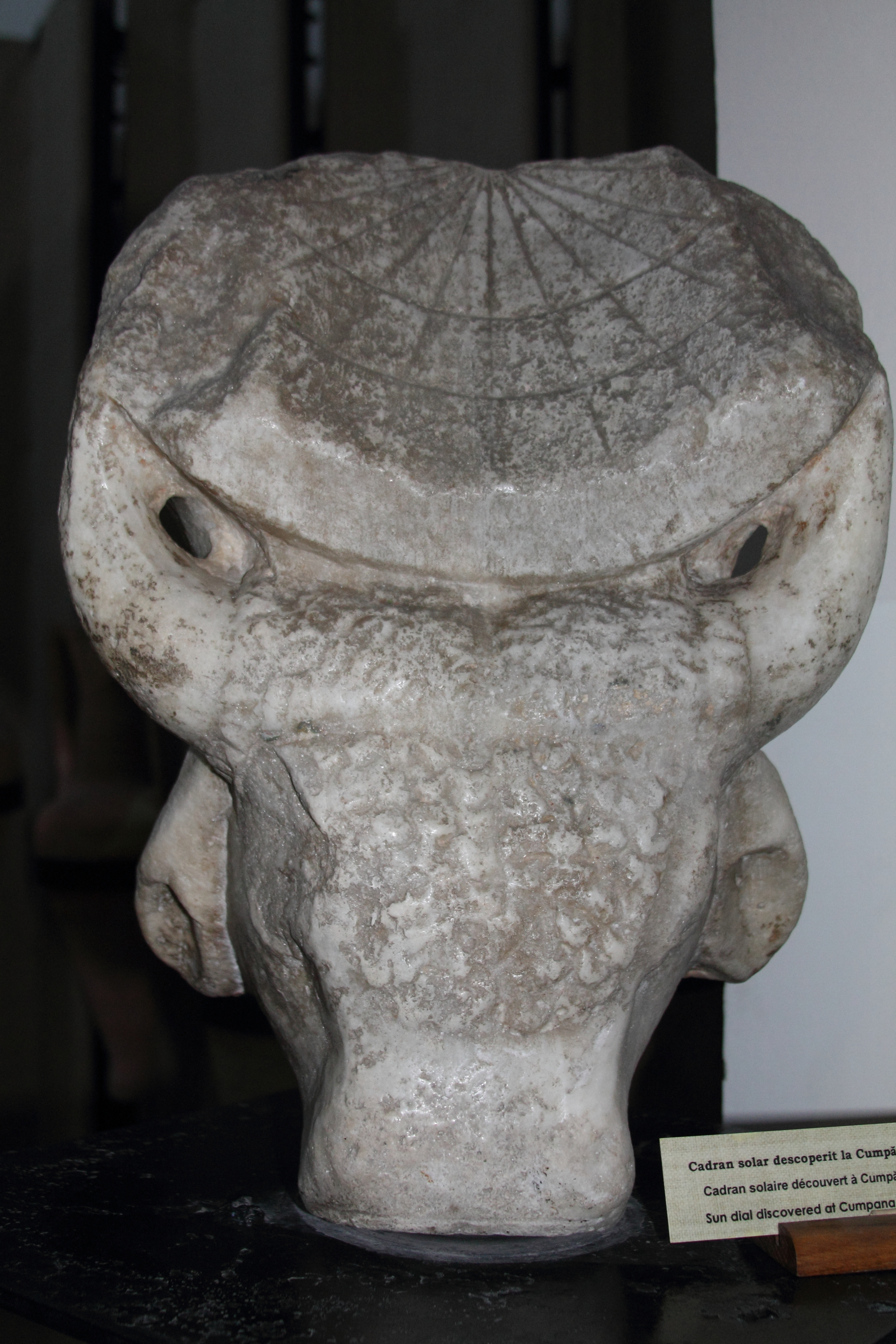
Roman sundial, 1st-2nd century, marble; from Cumpăna (Constanța County)

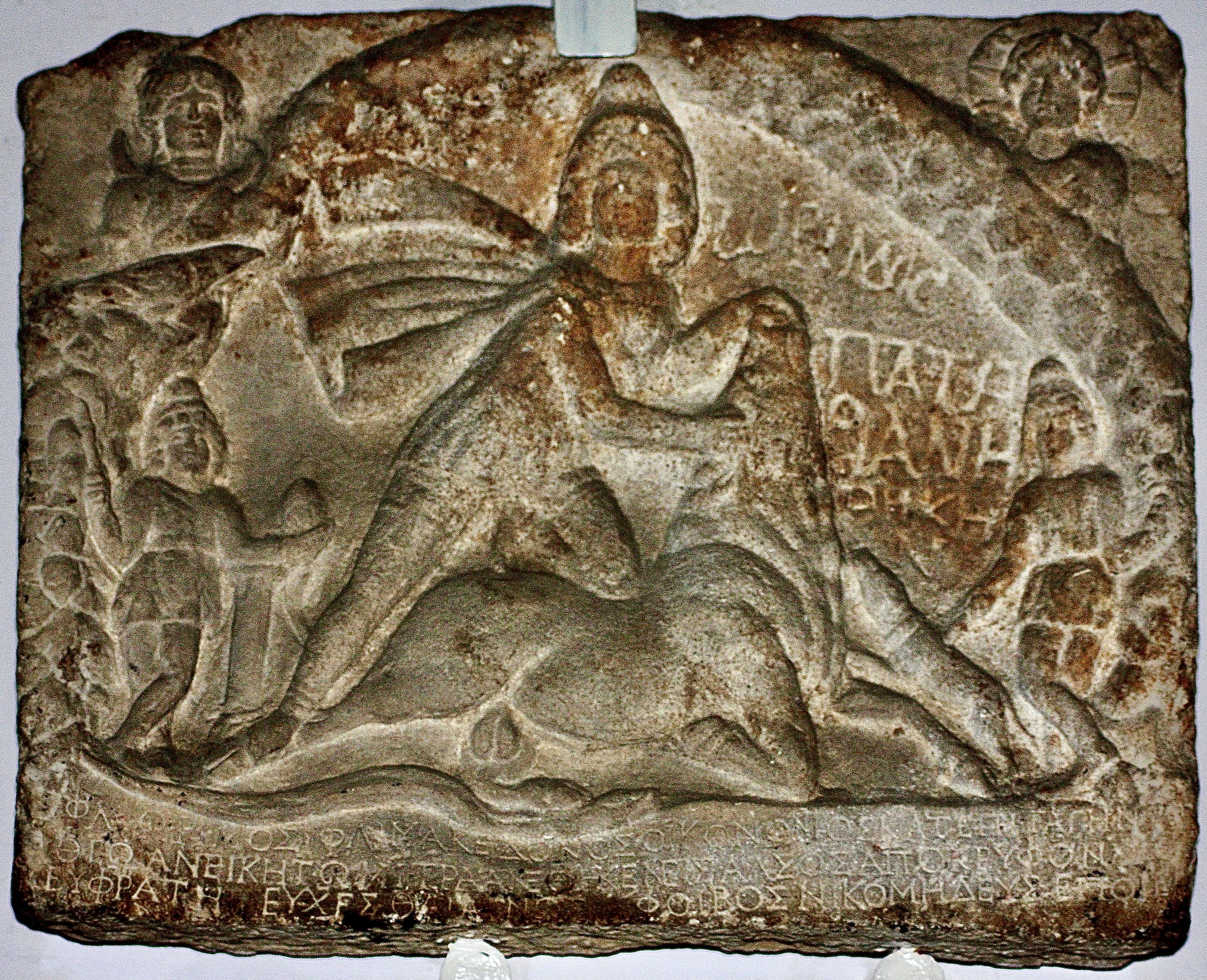
Mithriac low relief, 1st-2nd century; from the Adam Cave (Gura Dobrogei, Constanța County)

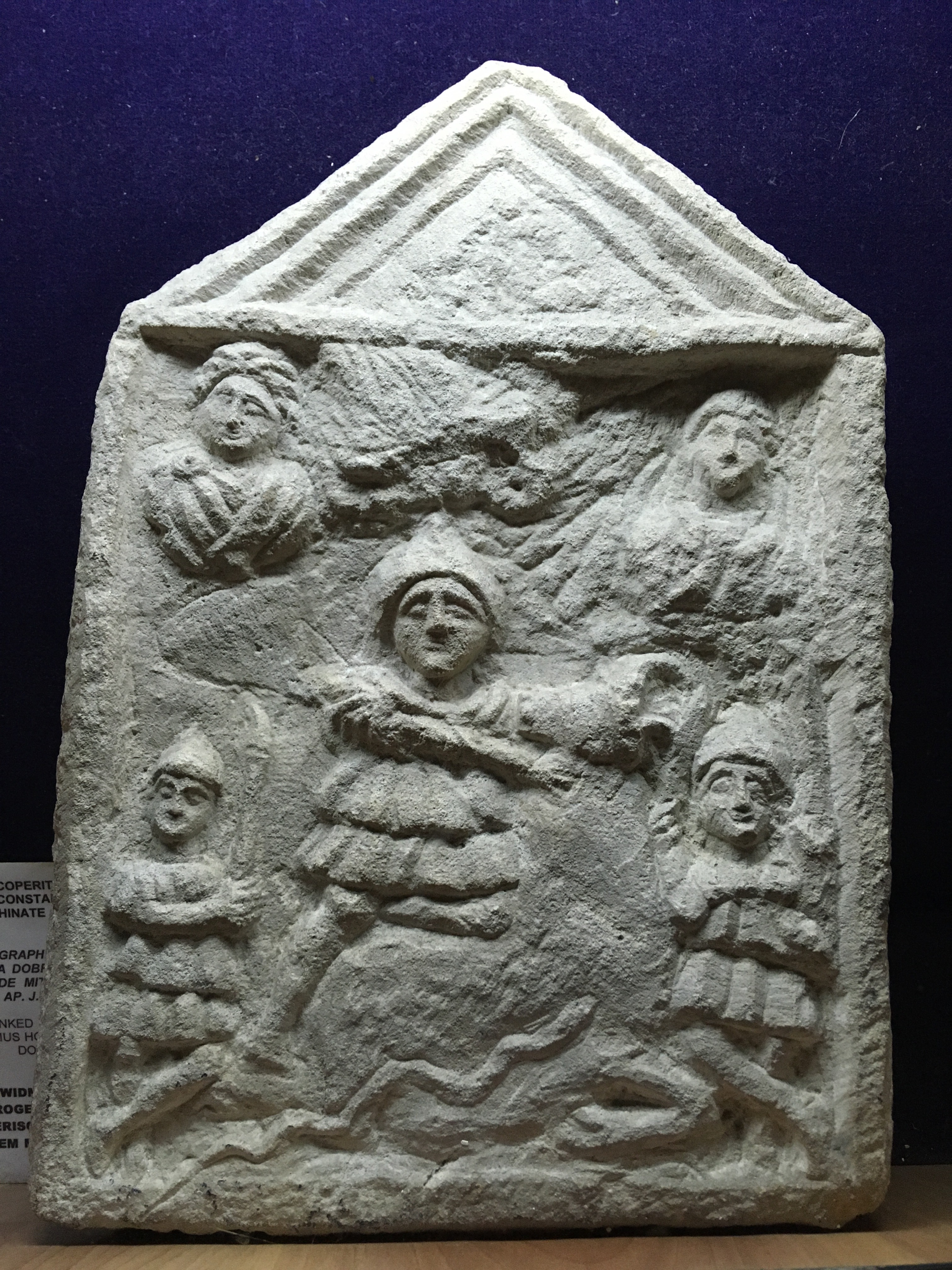
Mithriac low relief, 1st-2nd century; from the Adam Cave

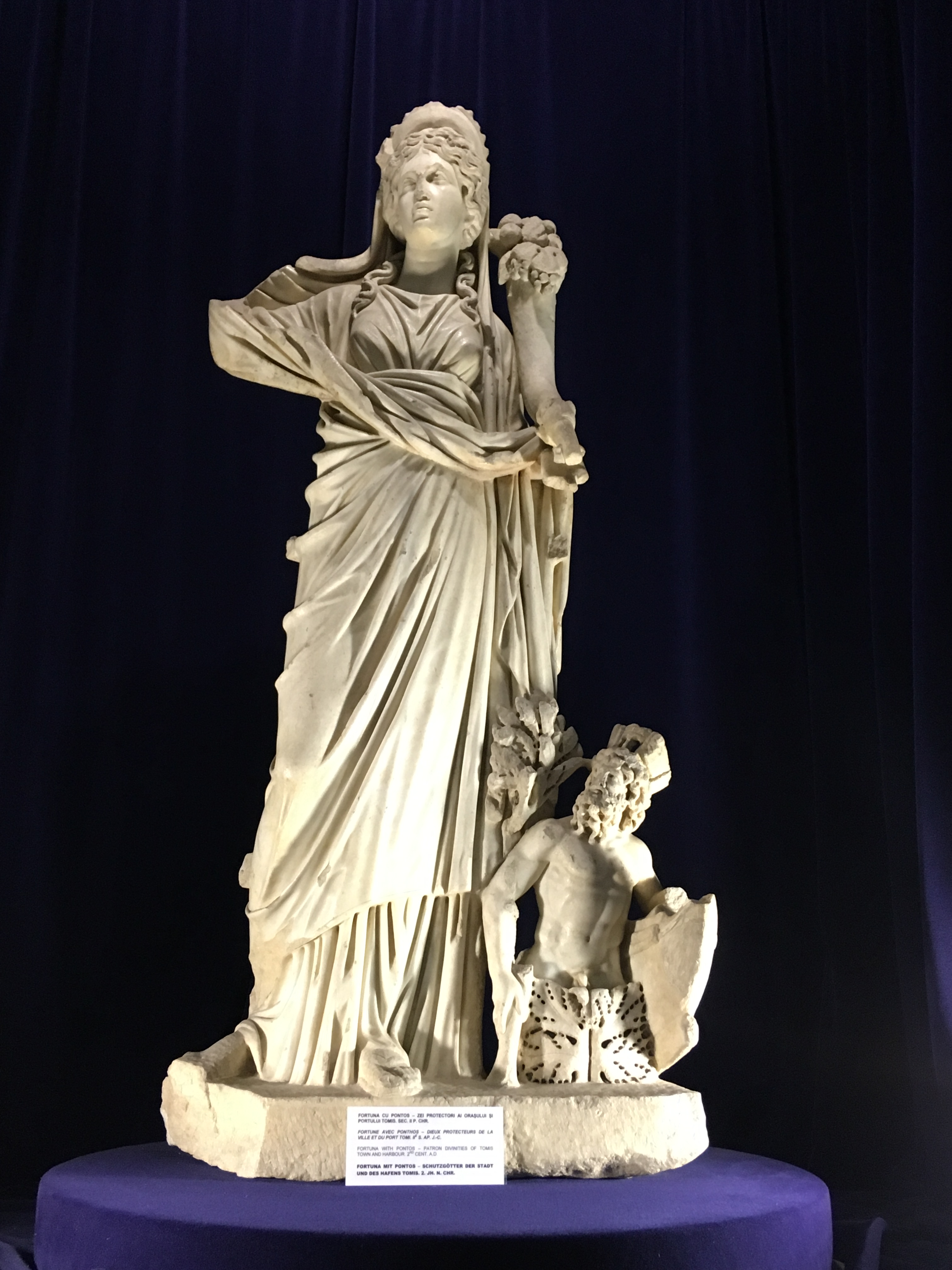
Fortuna with Pontus, 2nd century, marble; height: 1.55 m

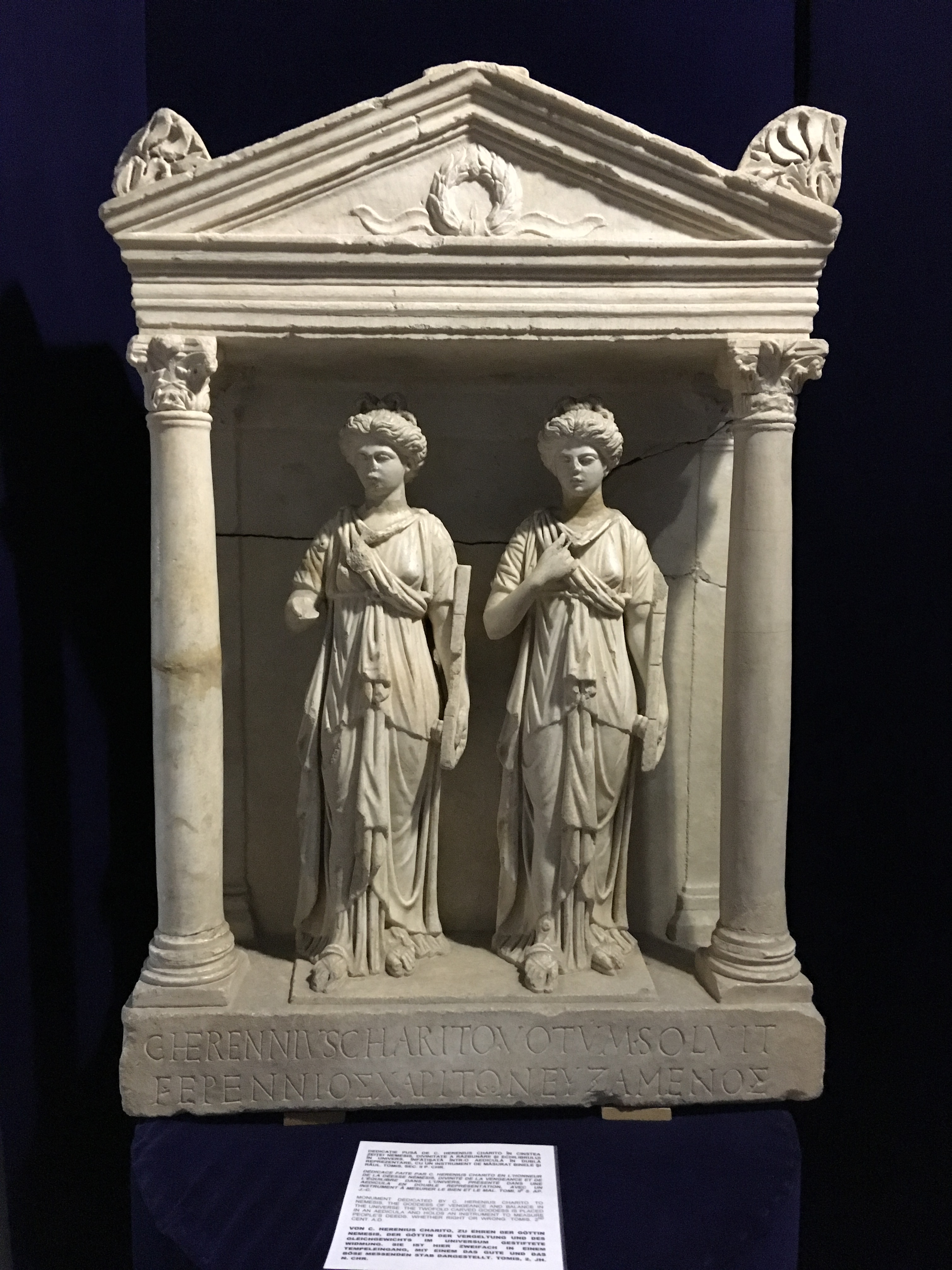
Aedicula with two female statues inside, representing the Ancient Greek goddess Nemesis, marble; height: 1.05 m, width: 0.5 m, thickness: 0.285 m

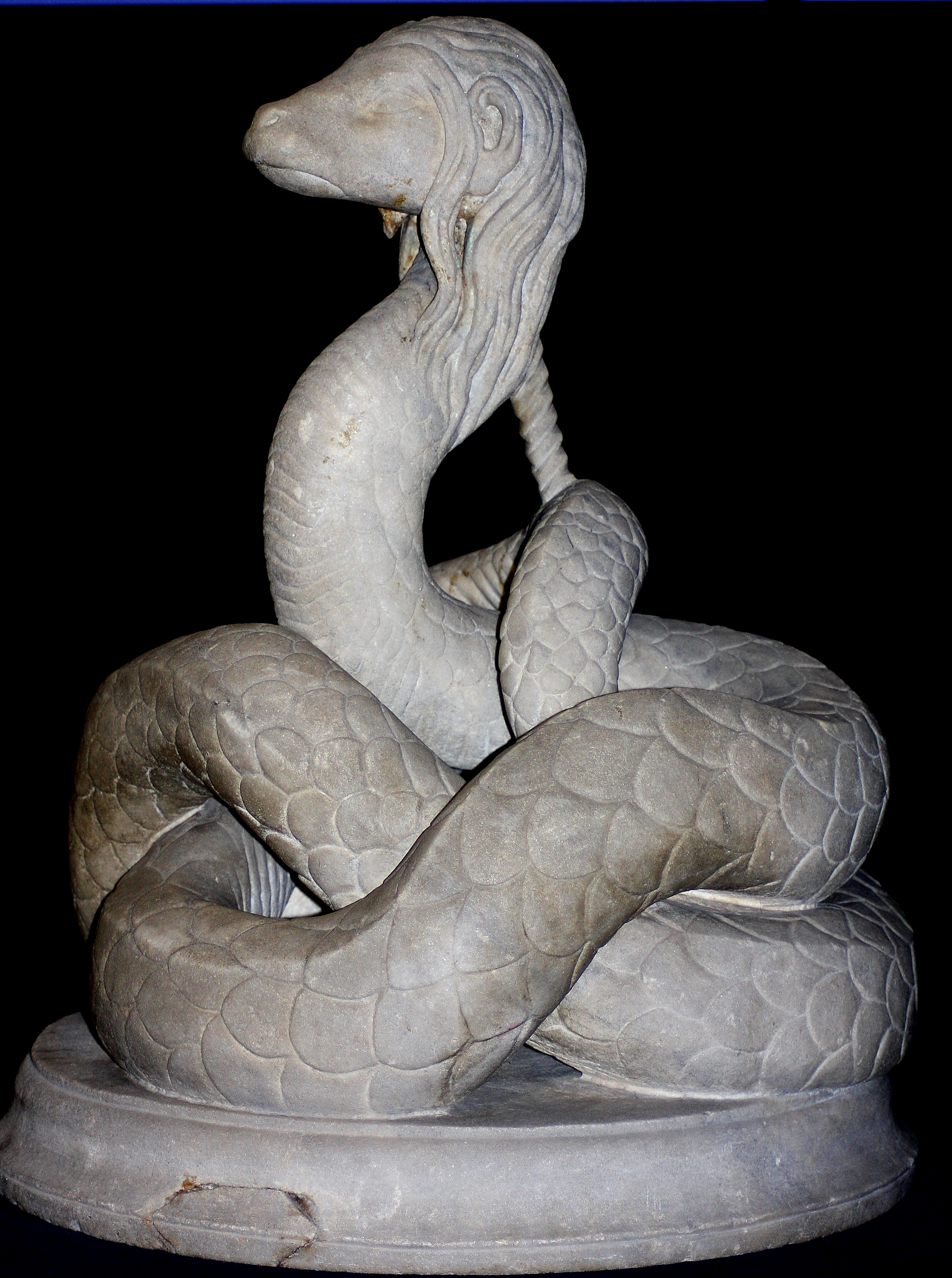
Statue of Glycon, late 2nd century, marble; height: 0.66 m

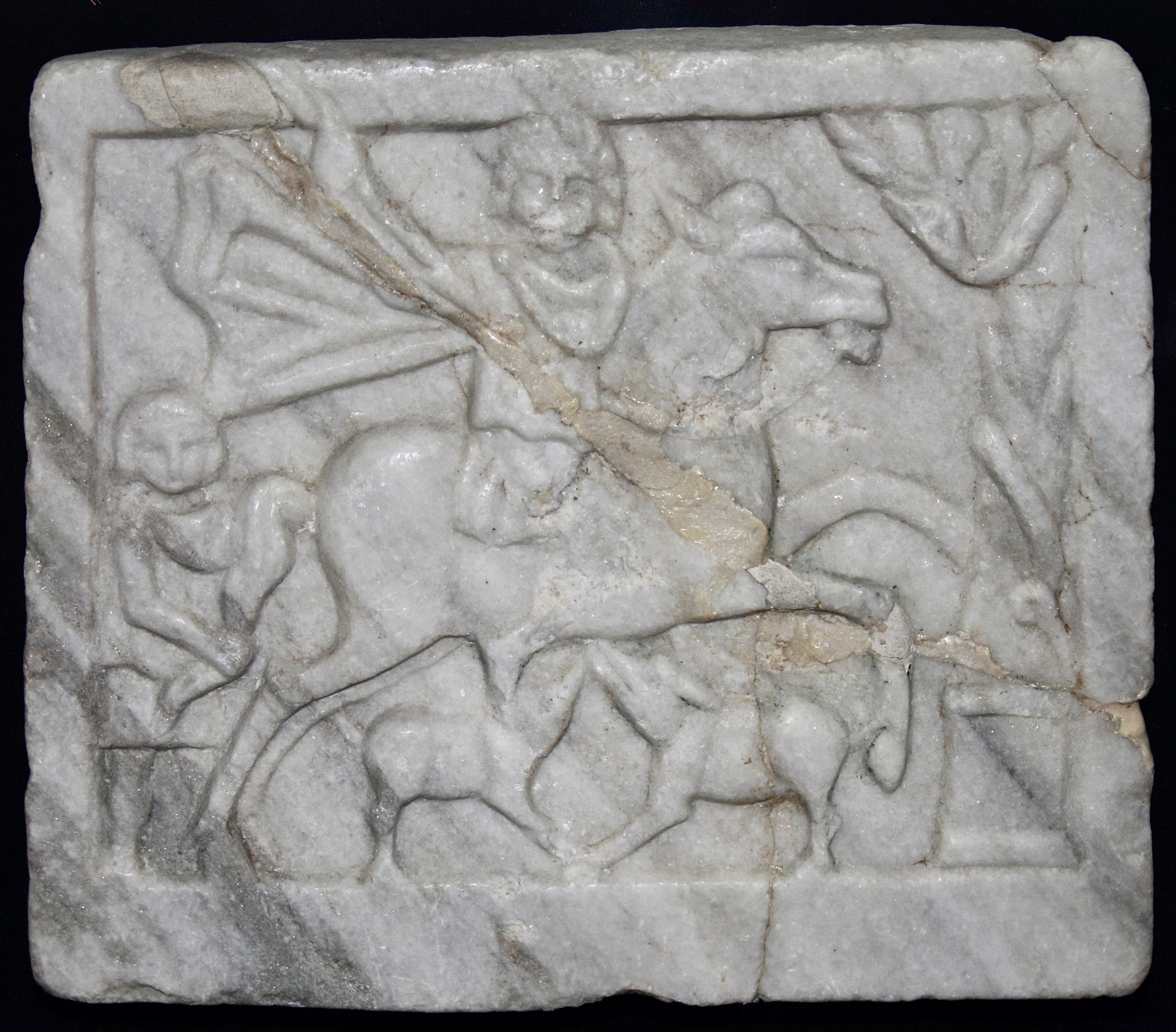
Low relief of a Thracian horseman, 3rd century, marble; height: 0.22 m, width: 0.225 m, thickness: 0.032 m

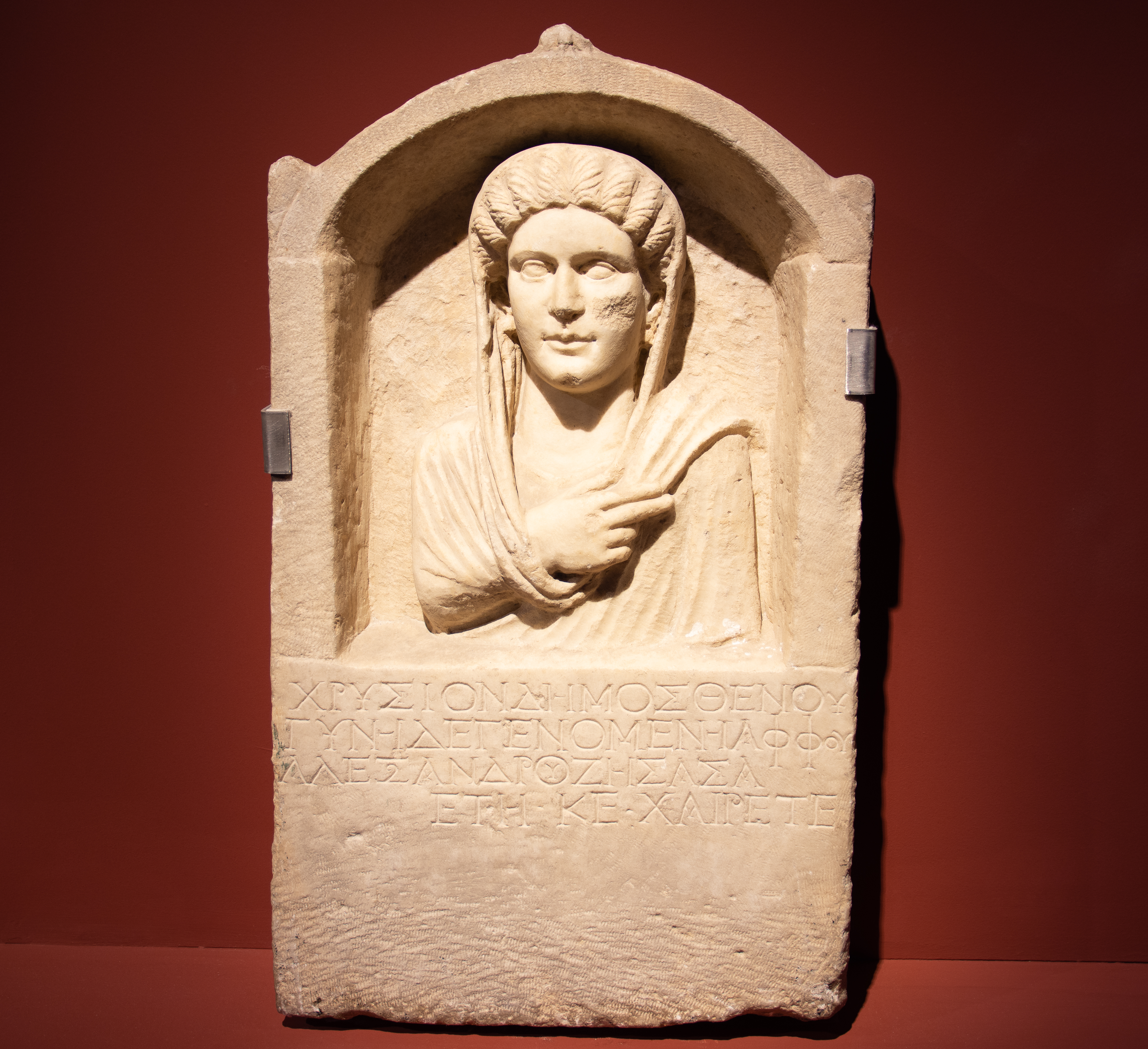
Funerary stela, 3rd-4th century, marble

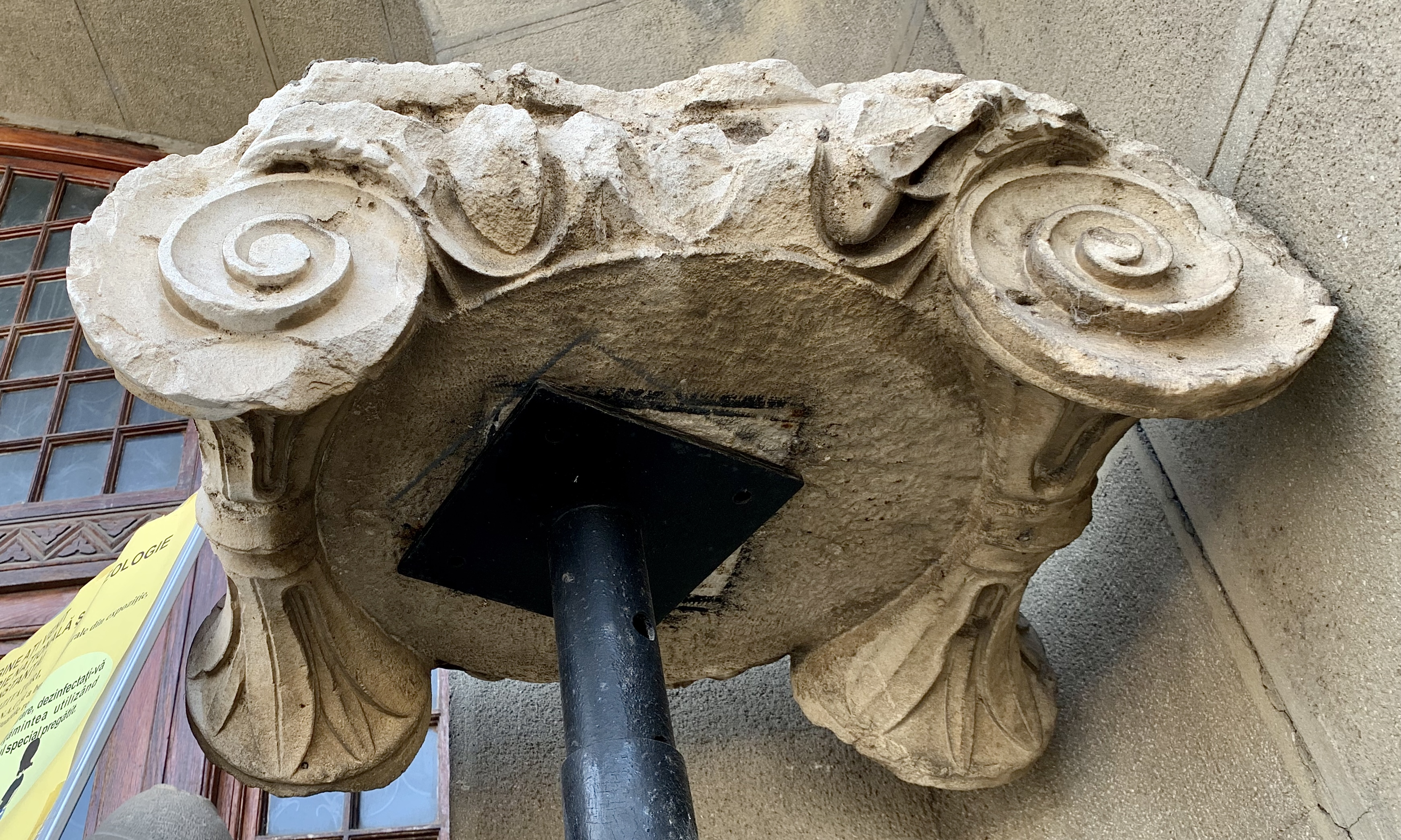
Ionic capital exhibited next to the museum entrance

== Building ==
The museum building was designed as a city hall by architect Victor Ștefănescu. Prince Ferdinand laid the cornerstone in May 1912. Construction was halted in 1913, restarted in summer 1914, then stopped again during World War I. The building was inaugurated in July 1921. Aside from its political and administrative function, it housed a beer hall in the basement, with room for 300 customers; as well as a coffee and pastry shop in a ground floor wing, and a restaurant in the other wing.

The structure is in Romanian Revival style, with a loggia, columns and small windows. At the time of its construction, was criticized for its excessive cost, and for blocking wind from the sea, creating a heat island. The building is listed as a historic monument by Romania's Ministry of Culture and Religious Affairs.
