= Grand Hotel du Boulevard =

Corinthia Grand Hotel du Boulevard Bucharest
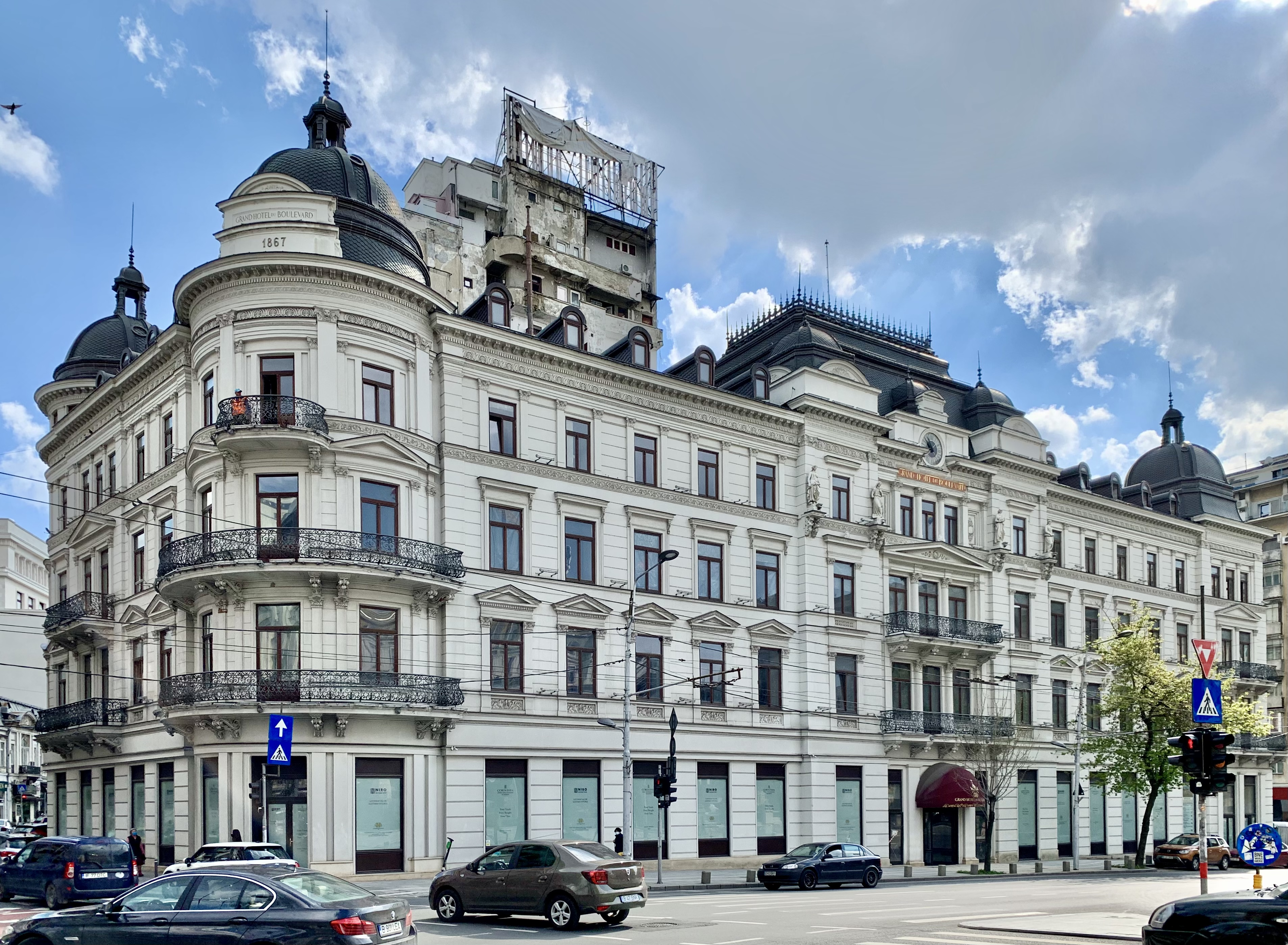

General information
- Architectural style: neoclassical
- Address: Bd. Regina Elisabeta 21, Sector 5
- Town or city: Bucharest
- Country: Romania
- Coordinates: 44°26′4.52″N 26°5′52.44″E
- Opened: 1873

Design and construction
- Architect(s): Alexandru Orăscu

Website
- hotelbulevard.ro

Monument istoric
- Part of: National Register of Historic Monuments
- Reference no.: LMI: B-II-m-A-18678

The Grand Hotel du Boulevard is a hotel in Bucharest, Romania, at the intersection of Calea Victoriei and Elisabeta Boulevard.

It first opened in 1873 as Hotel Herdan, and changed to its current name in 1877. The Grand Hotel du Boulevard is a Romanian historic monument.

In 2025, the hotel will reopen as Corinthia Grand Hotel du Boulevard Bucharest.
