= Cathedral of Saints Peter and Paul, Constanța =

Romanian religious seat and monastery

Coordinates: 44°10′16.5″N 28°39′39.6″E

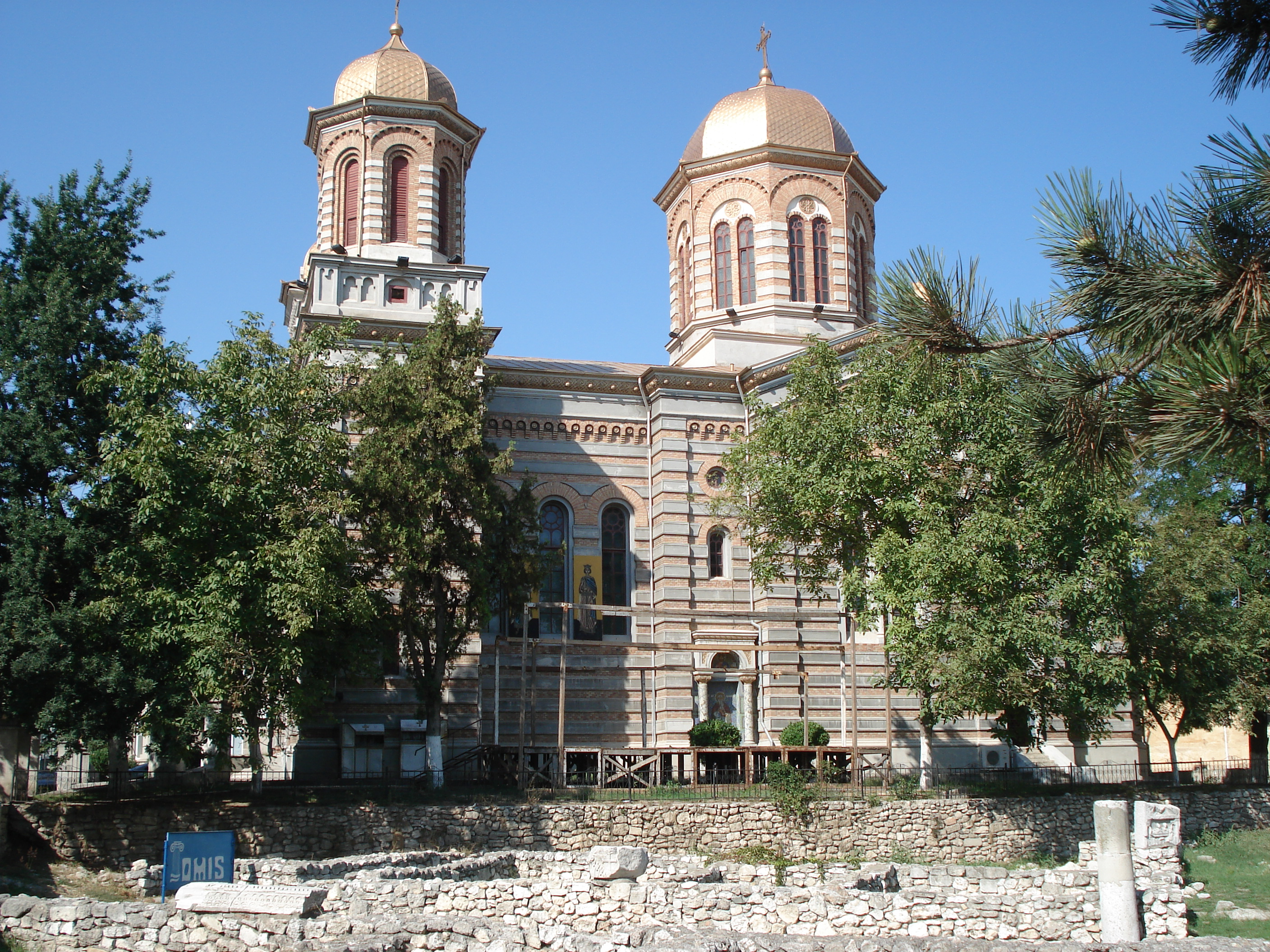
Constanța Cathedral, with ruins of the ancient city of Tomis in the foreground.

The Cathedral of Saints Peter and Paul, Constanța (Romanian: Catedrala Sfinții Apostoli Petru și Pavel din Constanța), located at 25 Arhiepiscopiei Street, Constanța, Romania, is the seat of the Romanian Orthodox Archbishop of Tomis, as well as a monastery. Situated between Ovid Square and the Black Sea in front of the Archbishop's Palace, it was built on the city's peninsular zone in 1883-1885 following plans by architects Alexandru Orăscu and Carol Benesch and, for the interior, Ion Mincu. The cornerstone was laid on 4 September 1883, during the reign of Iosif Gheorghian, Metropolitan of All Romania. The church was consecrated on 22 May 1895.

The building served as a parish church until 1923, when the Diocese of Constanța was established. In that year it became a cathedral, serving as such until 3 August 1941, when its altar and iconostasis, along with icons and paintings, were partly destroyed by aerial bombardment during World War II. It was restored after the war, from 1946 to 1951. Patriarch Justinian Marina and Bishop Chesarie Păunescu re-consecrated it on 14 January 1951; at that time, Păunescu's seat was moved from Constanța to Galați and the building once again became a parish church. Exterior repairs took place from 1957 to 1959. When the diocese at Galați became an archdiocese on 9 November 1975, a vicar bishop began serving at Constanța, returning the church to the status of cathedral, once again becoming an archdiocesan cathedral when the Tomis Archdiocese was revived in 1990.

The cathedral, in Greco-Roman style, of pressed brick, has a wide facade and a 35 m tower. Among the sculpted works are the oak iconostasis and choir, as well as candelabras and candle stands (made of a bronze-brass alloy), also designed by Mincu and executed in Paris. The frescoes were done by two Bucharest painters between September 1959 and November 1965. That month, when they were finished, Bishop Păunescu consecrated the church once again. The relics of Saint Panteleimon, donated in 1931, along with part of the relics of Saints Auxentius of Bithynia and Simeon Stylites, are kept inside. Also present are an icon of the Virgin Mary, said to be wonder-working, and the relics of Saints Epictetus and Astion, discovered in August 2001. On 1 December 2001, the latter were deposited in the cathedral, which on that date acquired the additional function of monastery; since that time, liturgies have been held according to monastic rites.

The Archbishop's Palace, begun in 1925, is located beside the cathedral, to the west. The cornerstone was laid by Patriarch Miron Cristea together with Bishops Grigorie Comșa of Arad and Ilarie Puiu of Hotin; Ilarie Teodorescu was then Bishop of Constanța.
