= Bretannio =

Roman Catholic and Eastern Orthodox saint

Saint Bretannio
- Died: ~380 AD
- Venerated in: Roman Catholic Church; Eastern Orthodox Church
- Feast: January 25

Saint Bretannio (also Bretanion, Bretannion, Vetranio, Vetranion) was a bishop of Tomi (today Constanţa, Romania) during the fourth century. Of Cappadocian origin, he occupied the see of Tomi from 360.

According to Sozomen, during the campaign against the Goths in this region, the emperor Valens stopped at Tomi and urged the populace to convert to Arianism and reject the Nicene Creed. Bretannio spoke out against this and for this he was exiled. However, due to public outcry over the bishop's exile, he was allowed to return.

Basil the Great requested of the ruler of Scythia Minor, Junius Soranus (Saran), that he should send him the relics of saints of that region. Basil was sent the relics of Sabbas the Goth in Caesarea, Cappadocia, in 373 or 374 accompanied by a letter entitled the 'Epistle of the Church of God in Gothia to the Church of God located in Cappadocia and to all the Local Churches of the Holy Universal Church'. The sending of Sabbas' relics and the writing of the actual letter has been attributed to Bretannio.

He may have represented Tomi at the council held in Constantinople in 381, but his name may have been confused with the name of the bishop Gerontius (Terentius) of Tomi, who may have been the actual participant at this council. Baronio, in compiling his martyrology, seems to have arbitrarily assigned him the feast day of January 25.
