= Cotroceni =

Neighbourhood in Bucharest, Romania

Coordinates: 44°25′58″N 26°04′18″E

Cotroceni on the Map of Bucharest

Cotroceni is a neighbourhood in western Bucharest, Romania, located around the Cotroceni hill, in Bucharest's Sector 5.

The nearest Metro stations are Eroilor, Academia Militară, and Politehnica.

== History ==
The Hill of Cotroceni was once covered by the forest of Vlăsia, which covered most of today's Bucharest. Here, in 1679 a monastery was built by Șerban Cantacuzino, later to be transformed into a palace in 1888 by King Carol I. Houses were built in the area near the palace by the royal servants and by high-ranking military personnel. Carol I also build a royal train station named Gara Cotroceni near the palace. The train station was relocated by the communist regime and was later used for transporting materials for the construction of Casa Poporului.

== Notable people ==
Important Romanian figures who lived in this neighborhood: Ion Barbu, Nicolae Herlea, Ion Minulescu, Marin Preda, and Liviu Rebreanu.

== Landmarks ==
- Cotroceni Palace, the official residence of the President of Romania, is located in this neighbourhood
- Bucharest Botanical Garden
- Carol Davila University of Medicine and Pharmacy
- The Bucharest Opera building
- University Hospital Bucharest
- New St. Eleftherios Church
- Saint Elisabeth Chapel, Bucharest
- Casa Radio

== Gallery ==
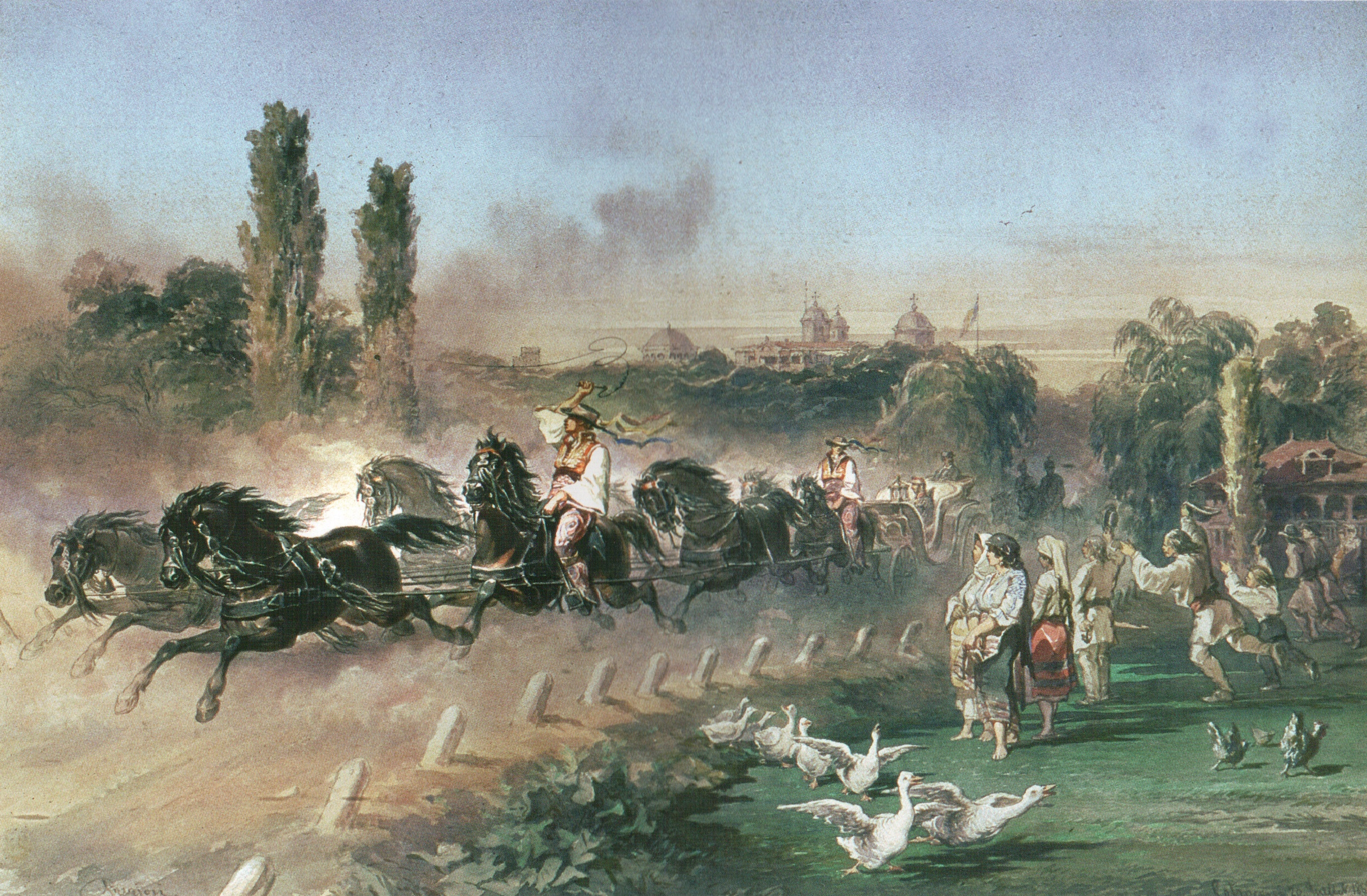
Carol I in the Royal coach in Cotroceni, 1860s

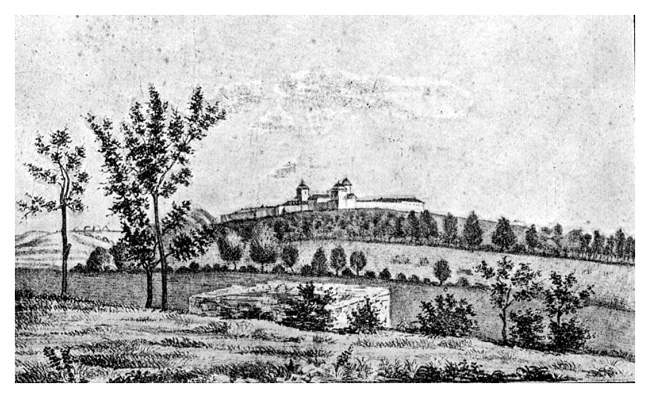
Cotroceni Monastery, 1860

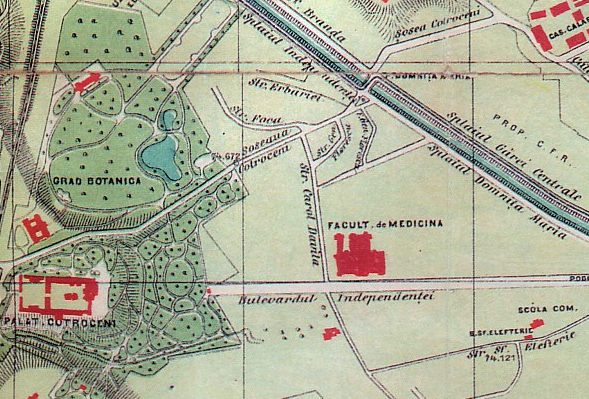
Map of Cotroceni area, circa 1895

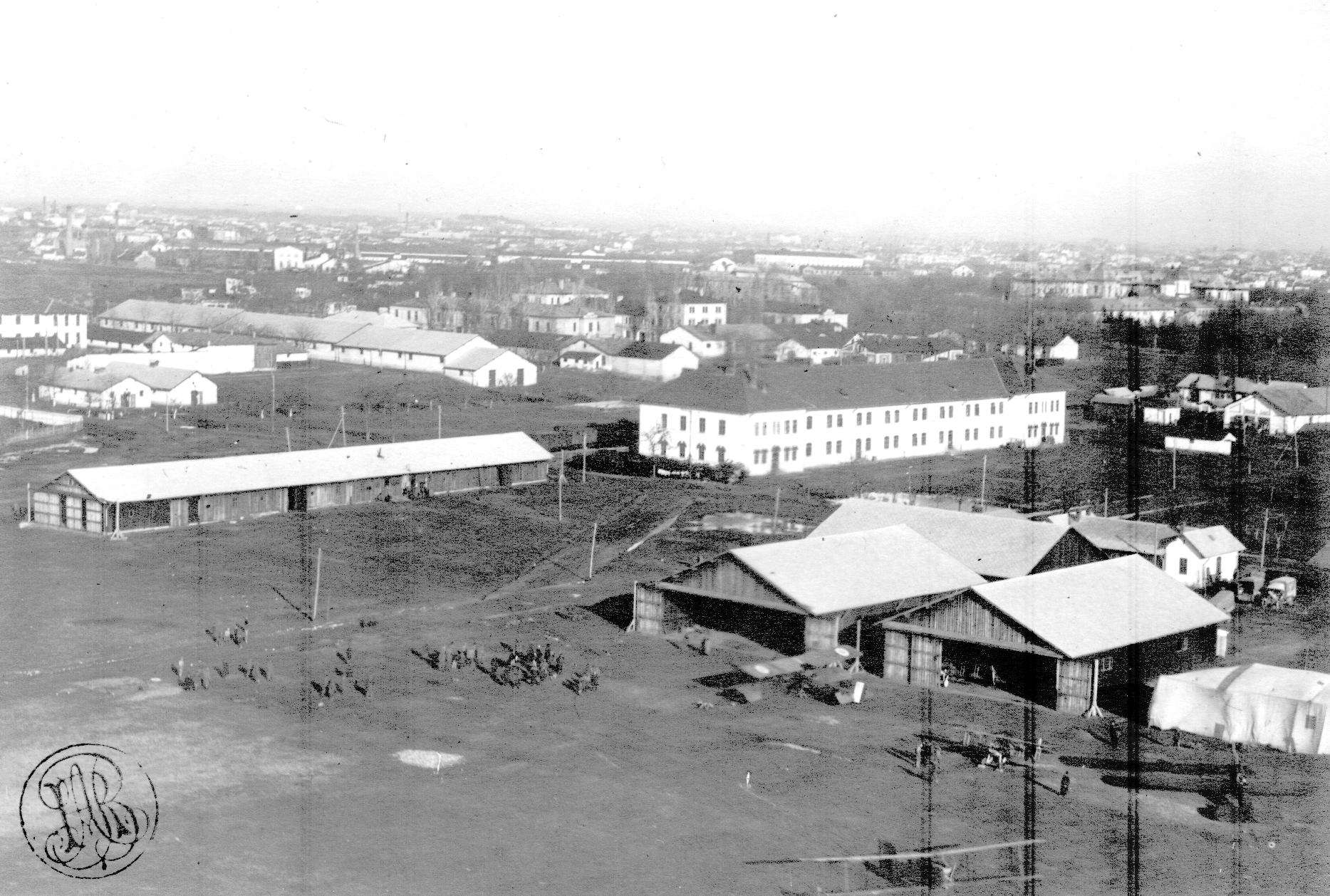
Aerial view of the Cotroceni airfield, 1920s
