= Domnița Bălașa Church =

Historic church in Bucharest, Romania

Coordinates: 44°25′42″N 26°06′01″E

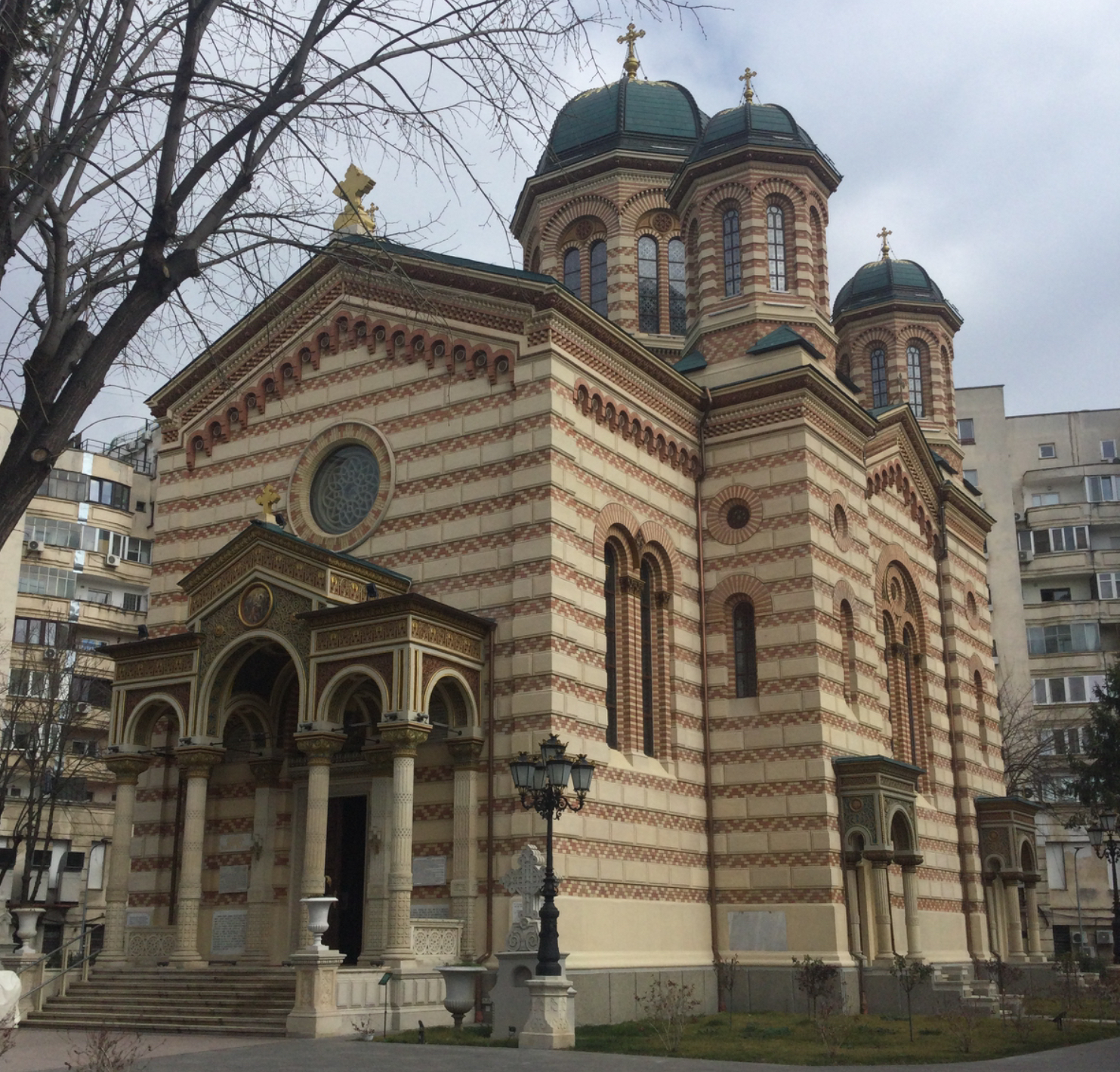
Domnița Bălașa Church

The Domnița Bălașa Church (Romanian: Biserica Domnița Bălașa) is a Romanian Orthodox church located at 60 Sfinții Apostoli Street in Bucharest, Romania. It is dedicated to the Feast of the Ascension, to Saint Dimitrie Basarabov and to Constantin Brâncoveanu and his four sons.

== History ==
Domnița (Princess) Bălașa, the sixth daughter of Prince Constantin Brâncoveanu, founded two adjacent churches near the banks of the Dâmbovița River and her home. The first church, according to the pisanie, was built in 1743–1744, with Bălașa and her husband, High Ban Manolache Rangabé (called Lambrino) as ktetors. Dedicated to the Baptism of Jesus, it was situated southwest of the present church, its site now marked by a column. It had three naves and no domes, similar to certain Catholic churches, and was probably built by Italian workers. Subsequently used as a chapel for the Lambrino family, it was weakened by the 1838 earthquake, repaired in 1842 and demolished in 1871, together with the nearby ktetors’ houses. A commemorative stone was placed on the altar site in 1883.

Bălașa, left a widow in 1745, founded a second church on the site of the present one. Built in 1750–1751 (per the pisanie), it was dedicated to the Ascension and reflected the traditional Wallachian style. The artisans’ contracts have been preserved. Larger than the first church, it was open to the public. A school with Romanian as the language of instruction opened in one of the surrounding houses in 1745, and a nursing home in 1751. Ban Grigore Brâncoveanu repaired the church and houses in 1831; the latter appear on an 1852 city plan. Severely damaged by the 1838 quake, the church was demolished and a new one built in its stead from 1838 to 1842. Larger, in Gothic Revival style, with domes, the frescoes reproduced the ones on the previous church; the painter's contract survives. The ktetoressa was Safta Brâncoveanu, widow of Grigore and founder of the Brâncovenesc Hospital and complex. The 1842 pisanie is preserved on the wall of the current church. Damaged by Dâmbovița floods, it was demolished in 1881.

The present church, the fourth in the area, was built on the same site between 1881 and 1885, in Romanesque and Gothic Revival style. Metropolitan Calinic Miclescu led the project. Alexandru Orăscu was the architect, assisted by Carol Benesch and Friedrich Hartmann; his plans were reviewed by Jean-Jules-Antoine Lecomte du Nouÿ. King Carol I and Queen Elisabeth attended the liturgy and cornerstone laying on June 14, 1881, three months after the Kingdom of Romania was proclaimed. When the couple attended, they would sit to the left of the altar on thrones carved with the royal coat of arms and the official motto Nihil sine Deo; these remain in place. During the interwar period, the church was popular with the elite, who would hold weddings and baptisms inside; in keeping with its festive nature, the church has never hosted a funeral.

== Description ==
The church is fairly large, measuring 29.4 meters long by 12.3–18.4 meters wide. It is cross-shaped, ending in a polygonal altar apse. The side apses are enclosed by four staircases, with access from outside. The large Pantocrator dome rises above the center of the nave; it is surrounded by four smaller domes, also octagonal, each with its own access staircase. The narthex, with a choir area on the second floor, forms part of the massive central space. The western facade features a pediment emphasized by an ornamental cornice of carved stone, serrated brick and a frieze of "stalactite" recesses with buttons of red brick in the center. A sculpted rose window allows light to enter the choir. The narrower portico (8 × 4 meters) is formed from three frontal arches, the central one larger and with a pediment. These rest on cylindrical columns of Albești stone, with sculpted capitals and pedestals; a set of stairs leads up to the portico.

The facades have rows of yellow and red brick; the latter alternate with strips of plaster, forming a zigzag pattern. The large paired windows have stone frames on the upper part. Small rosettes are set into the stone around the stair heads. The interior oil painting, in Renaissance Revival style, featuring large compositions on a sober background, was done by two Viennese artists. The ktetors and their families appear on the western wall: Ban Manolache, Zoe and Constantin Brâncoveanu, the latter holding a model of the church, Domnița Bălașa and her mother, Doamna Marica Brâncoveanu. The portraits of new ktetors were added subsequently: on the south wall, Patriarch Justinian Marina, responsible for the 1959–1962 renovation; Saint Calinic of Cernica, canonized around this time; and on the north wall, Metropolitan Calinic, together with Saint Dimitrie Basarabov, added as a patron. The entrance doors, iconostasis and furniture are all carved artistically. The stained glass was done at Munich, while the valuable chandelier is from Vienna.

Two interior side niches hold the remains of Domnița Bălașa (1693–1752, on the right or south side) and Zoe Brâncoveanu (1800–1892, the first wife of Gheorghe Bibescu, on the left, north side). Bălașa's funerary monument depicts Sadness, and is the work of sculptor Ion Georgescu, while Zoe's was done by French sculptor Jules Roulleau. A monument to Bălașa, the work of Karl Storck, was brought to the surrounding park in 1992. As was typical at the time for buildings in riverbank areas, the foundations were laid on oak beams. When the Dâmbovița's course was altered, the foundations dried up and eventually rotted, leading to cracks in the walls. Further deterioration was caused by the 1940 earthquake. Radical repairs were thus carried out in 1959–1962, both on the structure and on the painting. Another consolation occurred after the 1977 earthquake. The church was re-sanctified in 1994, when Brâncoveanu and his sons were added as patrons. A thorough restoration was undertaken between 2018 and 2022.

The church is listed as a historic monument by Romania's Ministry of Culture and Religious Affairs. Both funerary monuments as well as the outdoor sculpture are also listed.

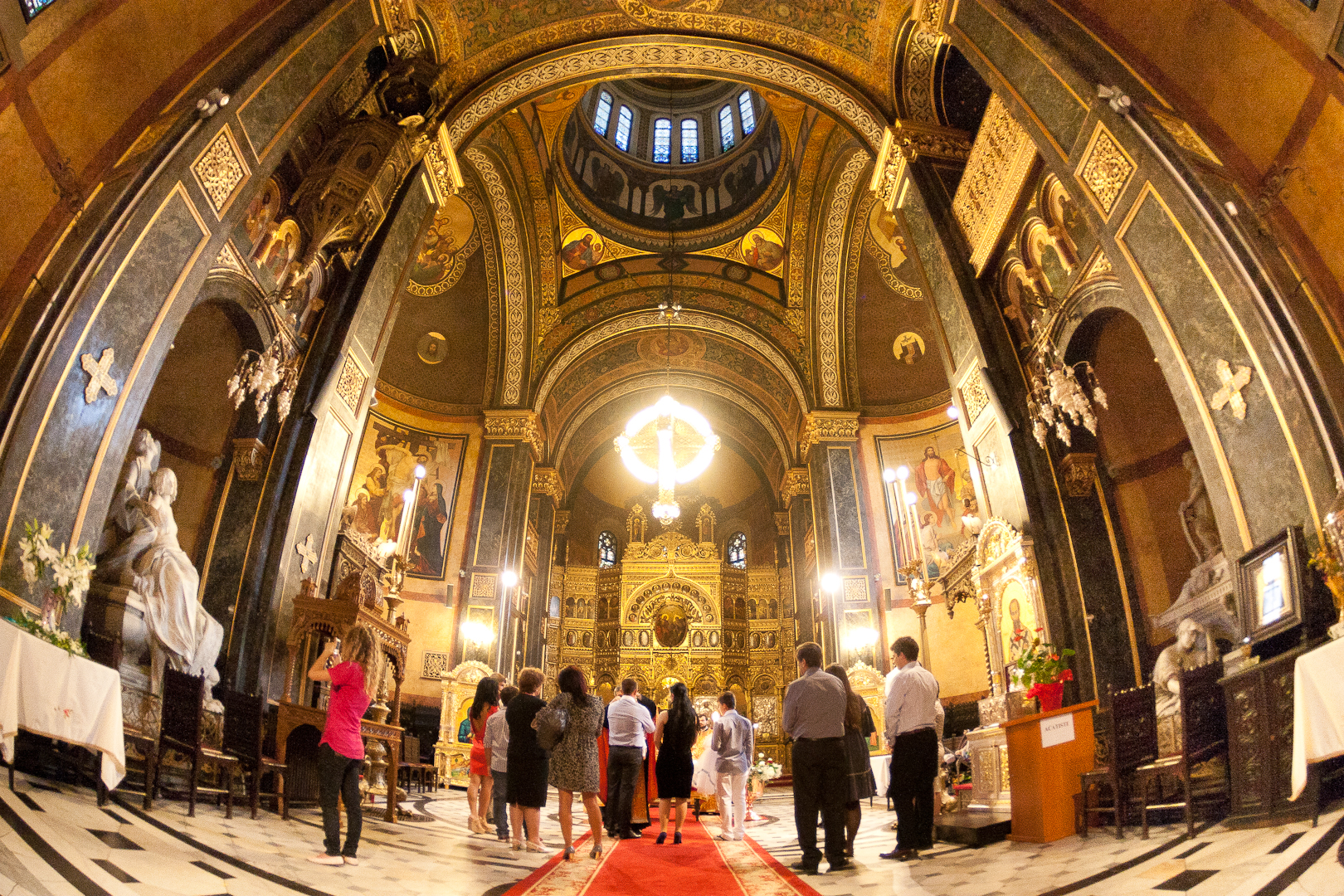
Church interior

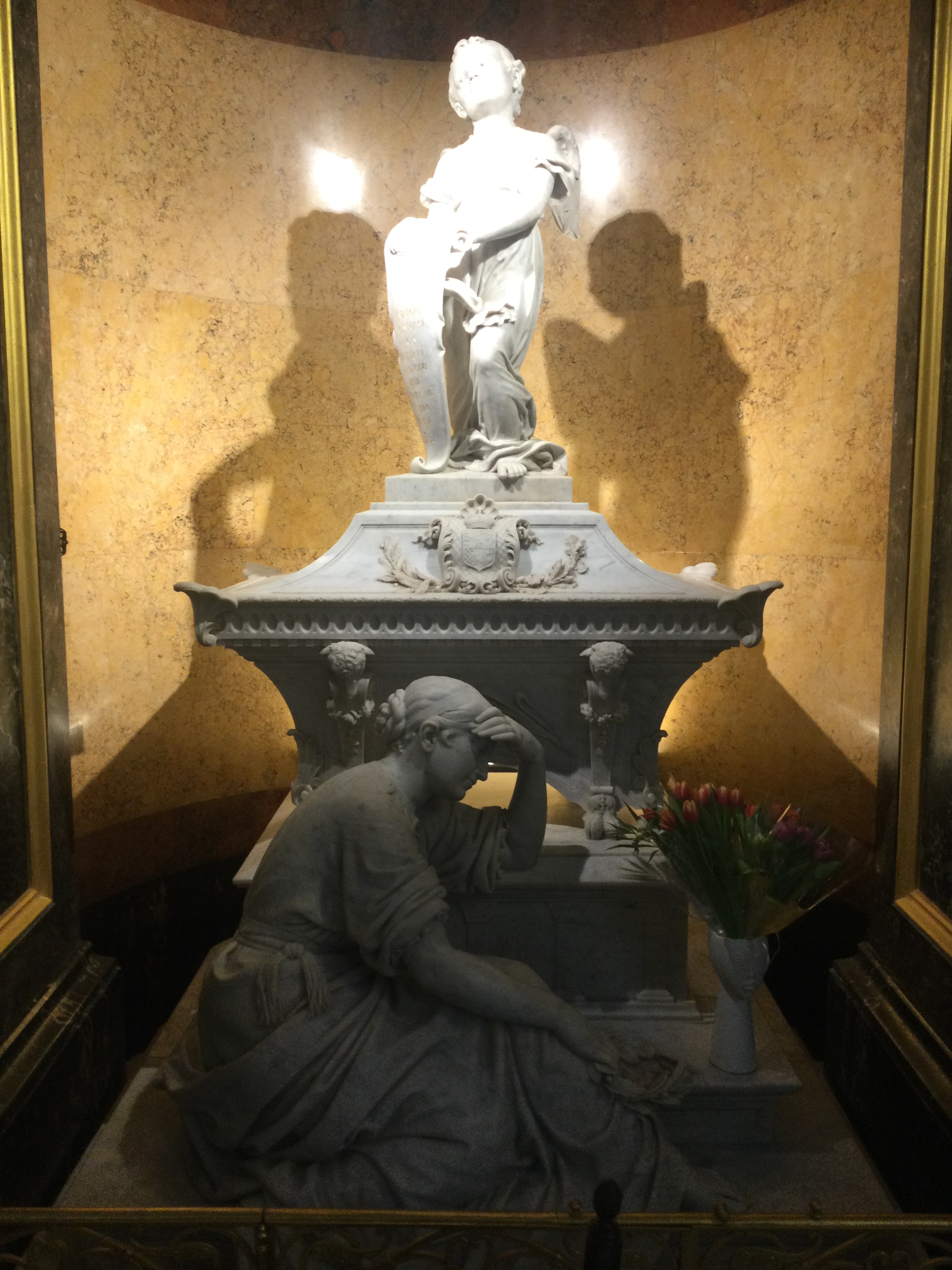
Domnița Bălașa grave

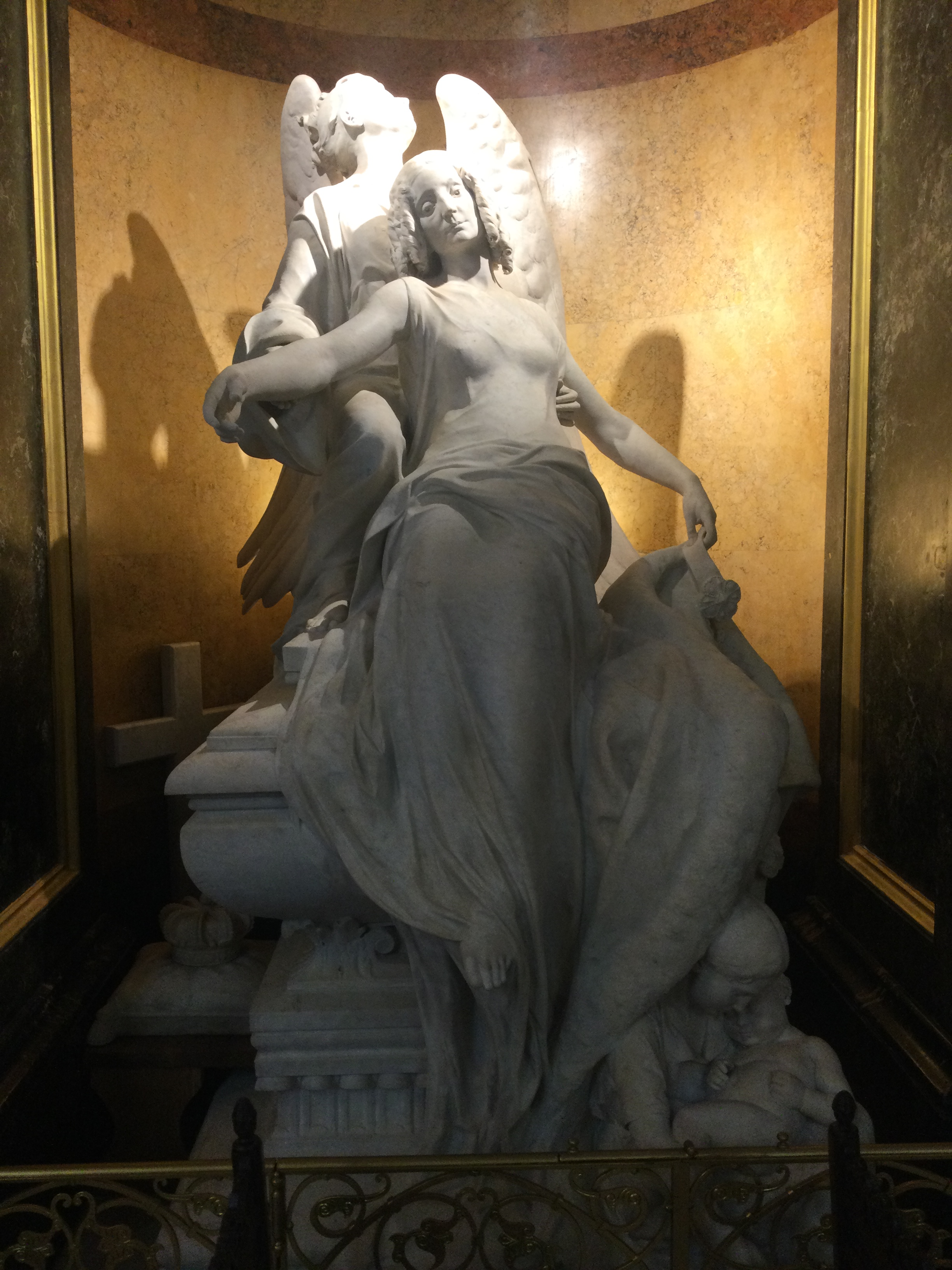
Zoe Brâncoveanu grave

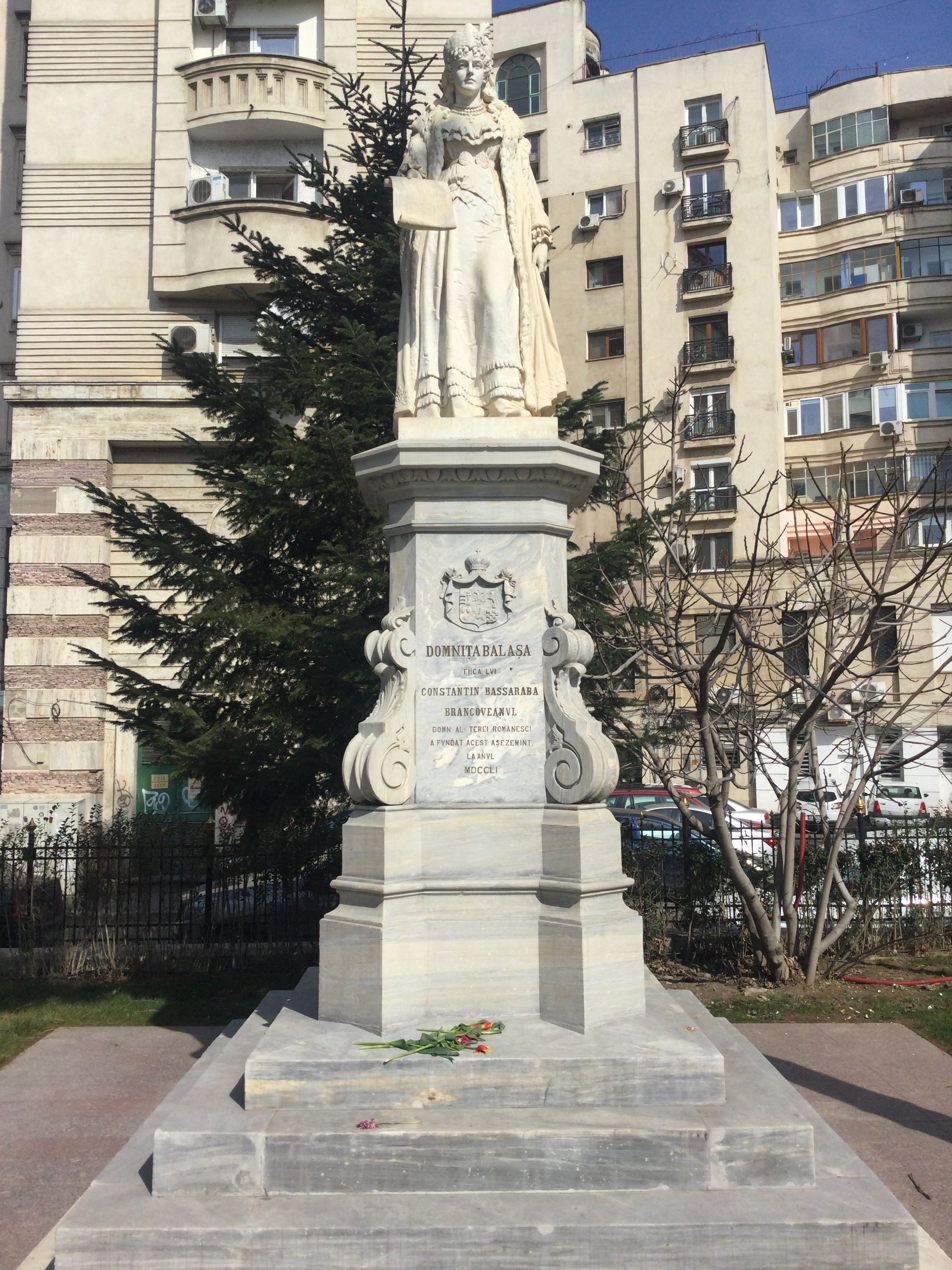
Domnița Bălașa monument
