= Carol Benesch =

Silesian architect

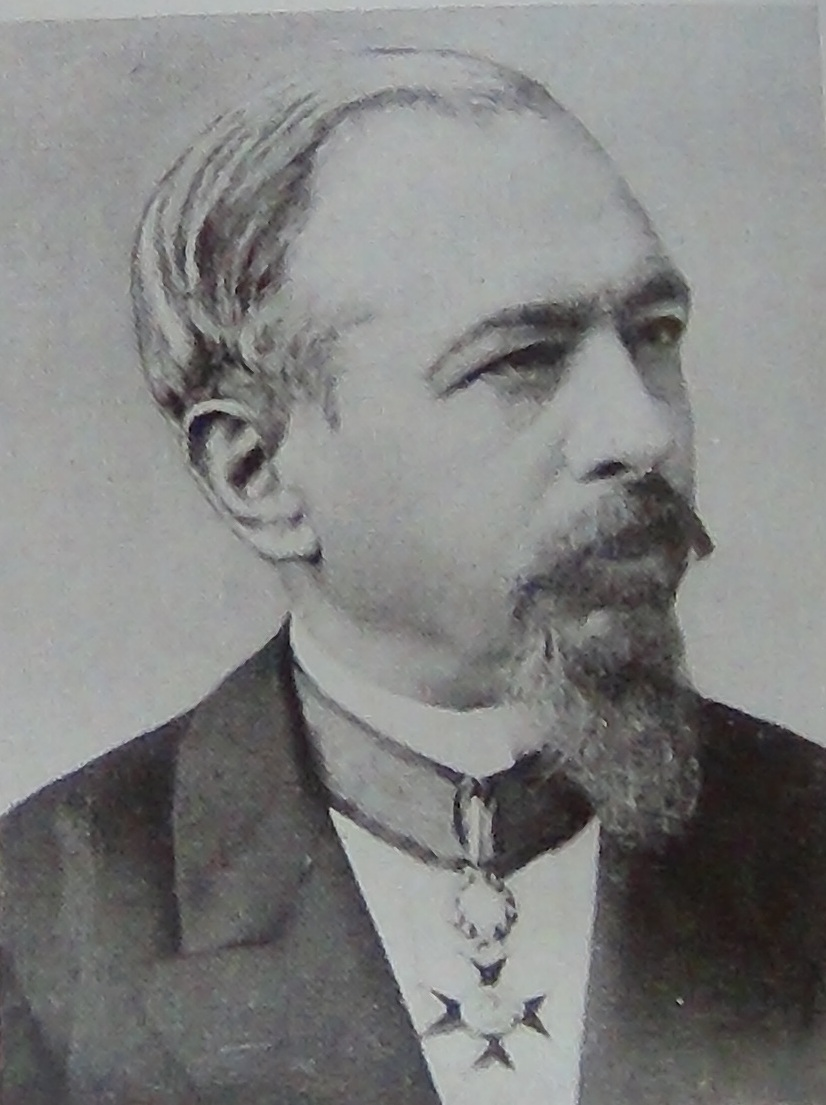
- Kingdom of Romania
- Born: January 9, 1822; Jägerndorf, (today Krnov, Czech Republic)
- Died: October 30, 1896 (aged 74); Bucharest, Romania
- Occupation: Architect
- Awards: 1881 Knight Commander KCSG Order of St. Gregory the Great
- Buildings: Peleș Castle; St. Joseph Cathedral Bucharest; Brâncovenesc Hospital Bucharest reconstruction of Tismana Monastery reconstruction of Bistrița Monastery

Carol Benesch (January 9, 1822, Jägerndorf, Austro-Hungarian Empire, today Krnov, Czech Republic – October 30, 1896, Bucharest, Romania) was a Silesian architect of Historicism and Eclecticism orientation established in the Kingdom of Romania.

He was the father of Oscar Benes (1866-1925), chief architect of Bârlad.

In different documents his name is spelled Carl Benesch, Carol Benisch, Carl Benisch, Carol Beneș, Carl Beneș, Carol Beniș, Carl Beniș.

== Education and career ==
Benesch studied architecture in Vienna. Shortly after graduation he was asked by Prince Nicolae Bibescu-Brâncoveanu to come to Wallachia, where he became an architect in Bucharest.

In 1865 he was nominated Chief Architect of the City of Bucharest.

Benesch was founding member and first vice-president of The Architects Society in Romania (Societatea Arhitecților din România) (1891-1892).

== Significant buildings ==
- Peleș Castle - Sinaia
- St. Joseph's Cathedral (Catedrala Sfântul Iosif), Roman Catholic Cathedral - Bucharest - 1873-1884
- Domnița Bălașa Church - Bucharest 1885
- Brâncovenesc Hospital (Spitalul Brâncovenesc) - Bucharest 1881-1885
- Cathedral of Saints Peter and Paul, Constanța - 1883-1885
- Asylum Elena Doamna (Azilul Elena Doamna) and Saint Elizabeth Chapel - Bucharest 1862-1870, 1870-1875
- Reconstruction of Tismana Monastery - Gorj County - 1855
- Reconstruction of Bistrița Monastery - Vâlcea County - 1855
- Reconstruction of Arnota Monastery - Vâlcea County - 1851

== Awards and honors ==
In recognition of his personal service to the Holy See and the Church, for his works of the St. Joseph's Cathedral (Catedrala Sfântul Iosif), in 1881, Benesch was awarded by Pope Leo XIII with the Pontifical Equestrian Order of St. Gregory the Great, Knight Commander KCSG, being named Carol Vallaquiensi (Carol of/from Wallachia).

Benesch received his Romanian citizenship by decree from King Carol I of Romania, who waived the usual lengthy process.

== Death ==
Benesch died on October 30, 1896. He is buried in the Catholic wing of the Bellu cemetery in Bucharest.
