= Saint Elizabeth Chapel =

Romanian Orthodox chapel

Coordinates: 44°25′53″N 26°03′42″E

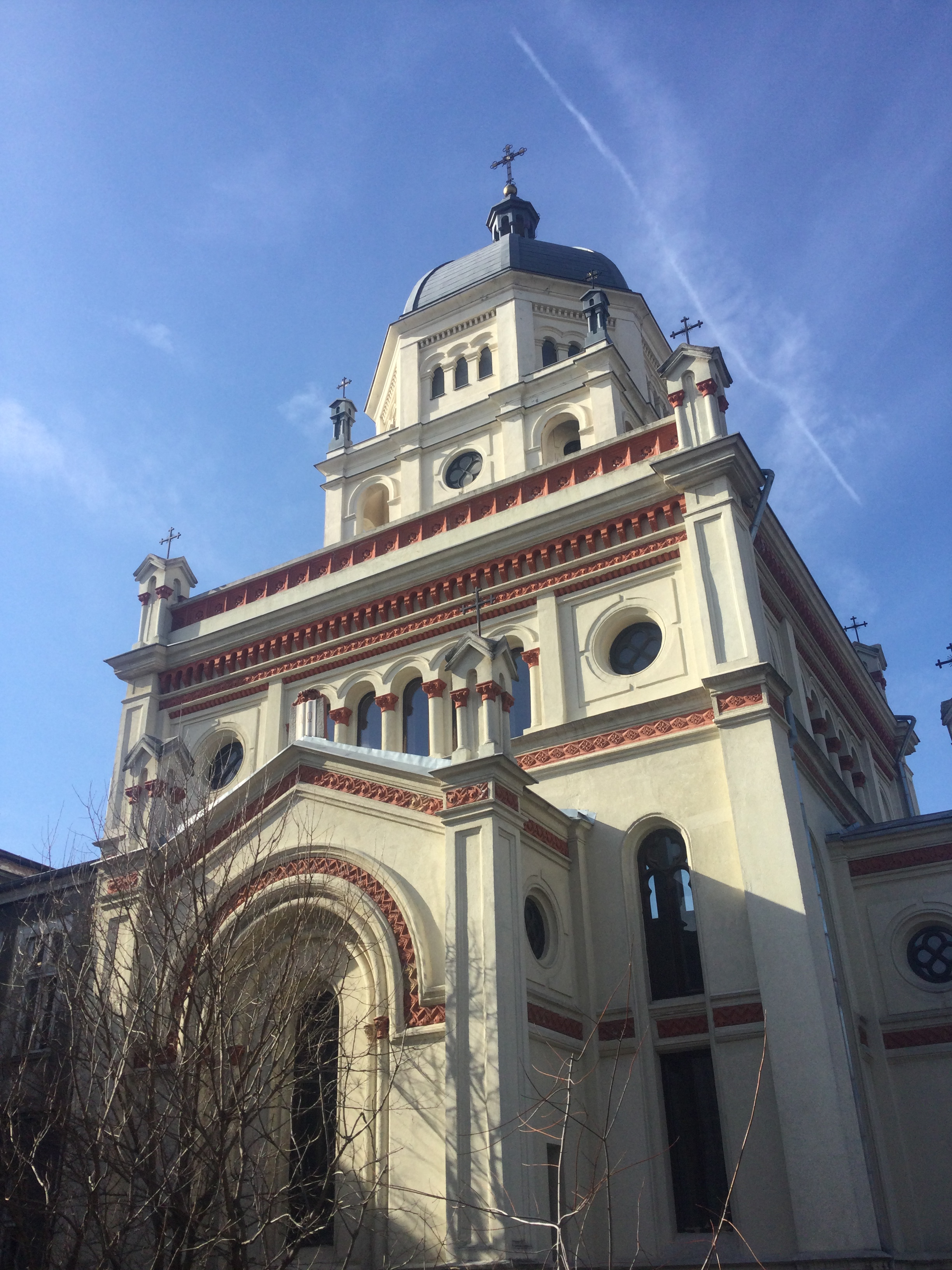
Saint Elizabeth Chapel

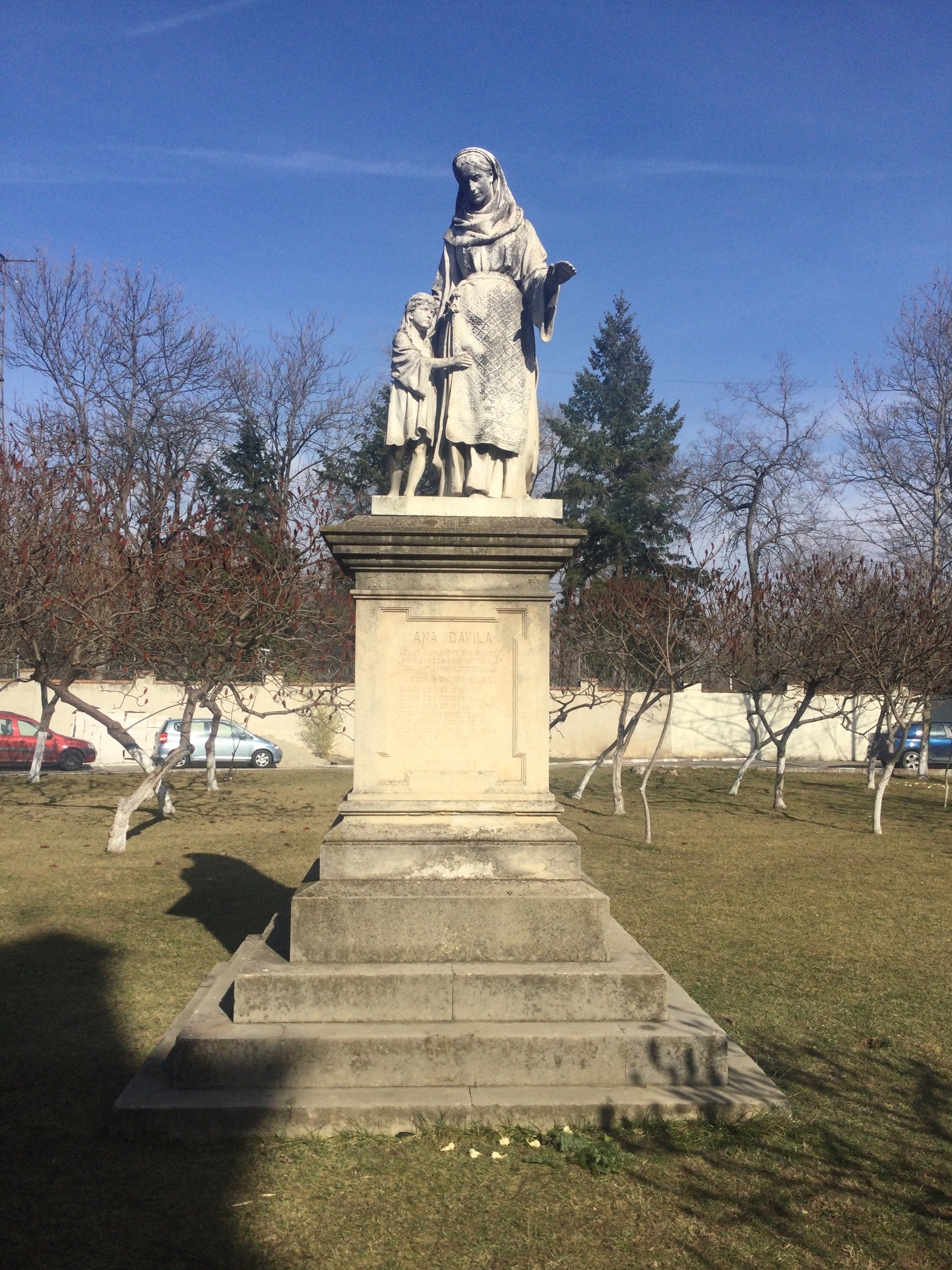
Ana Davila monument

The Saint Elizabeth Chapel (Romanian: Capela Sfânta Elisabeta or Elisabeta Doamna) is a Romanian Orthodox chapel located at 90-92 Panduri Highway in the Cotroceni district of Bucharest, Romania. It is dedicated to Saint Elizabeth.

The chapel was built on the grounds of a girls’ orphanage that opened in 1862; this was founded by and named after Elena Doamna, the consort of domnitor Alexandru Ion Cuza. In January 1870, her successor, Elisabeth of Wied, visited the orphanage and was warmly welcomed by the girls. She subsequently decided to open a public subscription for a chapel, becoming the first donor, with 12,000 lei or 600 gold coins. The campaign was a success and the cornerstone was laid in April. Carol Benesch, who had designed the orphanage, was the main architect. Gheorghe Tattarescu painted the interior, while Carol Storck carved the choir, iconostasis and other wooden features. Elisabeth donated furniture, liturgical books and a gilt Gospel Book painted by her. The chapel was dedicated in 1875 in the presence of the ruling family, dignitaries and a large crowd.

In 1954, the early communist regime shut down the chapel. The Baroque iconostasis, with its three arches resting on short columns, along with several icons, were taken to another church. Later, alleged Satanists used the building as a meeting place, and it deteriorated further. Repairs began in 1992, after the Romanian Revolution, but a lack of funds led to their abandonment. Further repairs started in 2000 but were stopped the following year. In December 2003, a fire damaged the chapel, which had scaffolding inside. It was completely rebuilt in 2004.

The chapel adjoins the back wall of the former orphanage; a stone staircase of honor links the two buildings. The style is eclectic: neoclassical with Byzantine revival and romantic elements. Entry is either through the staircase or through an exterior vestibule on the western facade. The design is square, measuring 8 x 8 meters. A dome, visible from afar and resting on four pillars, rises above the center; it features a roof lantern and a cross. Its visibility increased when the top floor of the orphanage was demolished after the 1977 earthquake. There are three rectangular apses, to the west, north and east. The altar apse faces east, while the north apse has a window.

The church is listed as a historic monument by Romania's Ministry of Culture and Religious Affairs. The 1890 sculpture of the orphanage's first headmistress, Ana Davila, located in the churchyard, is also listed.
