= Archdiocese of Tomis =

Romanian Orthodox diocese

Archbishop of Tomis
- Archbishopric

Eastern Orthodox
- Incumbent; Teodosie (Petrescu)

Location
- Country: Romania

Information
- Established: 303
- Diocese: Constanța
- Cathedral: Cathedral of Saints Peter and Paul

Website
- arhiepiscopiatomisului.ro

The Archdiocese of Tomis (Romanian: Arhiepiscopia Tomisului) is a diocese of the Romanian Orthodox Church within Constanța County. It is part of the Metropolis of Muntenia and Dobrudja. The seat is in Constanța. It is headed by Archbishop Teodosie Petrescu.

== History ==
According to historical tradition, the apostles Andrew and Philip installed bishops here in the cities of the Roman province of Scythia Minor. Church historian Sozomen noted that in the IV century, these territories were part of a single diocese, which was governed by the Bishop of Tomis. First, he mentioned the Bishop of Dobrudja was Evangelicus (approx. 303). Sozomen also wrote of a meeting in 369 between the bishop of Tomis, Bretannion, and the Roman emperor Valens. Bishop Gerontius of Tomis participated in the sessions of the Second Ecumenical Council in 381. It is believed that at this time, the metropolis of Scythia was formed with a chair in Tomis. For this purpose, the Roman Emperor Theodosius I (the Great) [379–395] placed three dioceses on the Black Sea coast between the Crimea and modern-day Varna (Bulgaria) under the jurisdiction of the Tomis see. In 536, the diocese of Tomis was reorganized into a Metropolitan area and 14 subordinate Episcopal sees were established within the borders of Scythia Minor.

After the Slavic-Avar invasion, the see of Tomis became an autocephalous archdiocese. For a short time, the metropolis was restored in the X century, when Tomis was first mentioned in sources under the name of Constantia. The invasions of the XI—XII centuries, especially the Pechenegs, finally upset the Church organization in Dobrudja. Its restoration took place in the second half of the 13^{th} century, along with the resumption of Byzantine control over the area. Since Constantia (Tomis) had suffered greatly from previous invasions, the see of the metropolis was transferred to Vicina, in 1261. After the transfer of the last Metropolitan of Vicina, Hyacinth, to Wallachia (1359) and the formation of The Ungro-Wallachian metropolis, the jurisdiction of the Metropolitan of Silistra extended to the territory of Dobrudja. In 1388, Dobrudja became part of Wallachia. In 1417, Dobrudja was conquered by the Turks and came under the jurisdiction of the Silistrian metropolis.

In 1878, Dobrudja became part of Romania. In this situation, the entry of Dobrudja under the canonical jurisdiction of the Lower Danube Diocese (with a seat in Galaţi) on March 16, 1879, fulfilled the religious aspirations of the Romanians from Dobrudja.

In 1923, the Diocese of Constantia (Tomis) was created, which included the counties of the southern part of Dobruja: Constanţa, Ialomița, Durostor and Caliacra. In 1949, Tulcea County was also assigned the Diocese of Constantia, but in 1950, the Diocese of Constantia was abolished and its territory returned to the Lower Danube diocese, which became known as the Tomis and Lower Danube Archdiocese, in 1975.

On February 12, 1990, the Tomis and Lower Danube Archdiocese was split into the Archdiocese of Tomis and the Archdiocese of Lower Danube; the former new archdiocese covered all of Dobrudja. On April 15, 2004, the diocese of Tulcea was established in the territory of Northern Dobrudja.

== Ruling bishops ==
The following is a list of bishops of Dobrudja:

Bishops of Scythia

- Evangelicus (approx. 303)
- Marcus, participant at the First Council of Nicaea (325)
- Saint Bretannion, martyred under Valens (364–378)

Archbishops of Tomis

- Gerontius or Terentius, participant at the First Council of Constantinople (381)
- Saint Theotimos I (390–407)
- Timotheus, participant at the First Council of Ephesus (431)
- John I (448)
- Alexander, participant at the Council of Chalcedon (451)
- Theotimos II (457)
- Peter (c. 470 – 496)

Metropolitans of Tomis

- Paternus (519)
- Valentinianus (550)
- Aniketos (10^{th} – 11^{th} century)
- Basil (10^{th} – 11^{th} century)

Eastern Orthodox archbishops of Vicina

- Theodore (1285–1292)
- Luke (1302–1306)
- Macarius (c. 1337/1338 – c. 1347)
- Cyril (1347)
- Hyacinth (1348–1359)

Eastern Orthodox metropolitans of Tulcea

- Panaret (1839–1850)
- Dionisie (1870–1877)
- Nichifor (c. 1877 – 1878)

Bishops of Constanţa (Tomis)

- Ilarie Teodorescu (1923–1925)
- Gherontie Nicolau (1926–1942)
- Eugenie Laiu (1942–1944), locum tenens
- Chesarie Păunescu (1944–1950)

Archbishops of Tomis

- Lucian Florea (1990–2001)
- Teodosie Petrescu (2001–present)
