= Remus Opreanu =

Romanian politician (1844–1908)

Remus Opreanu (September 22, 1844 – October 23, 1908) was a Romanian jurist and politician.

After studying for a year at the University of Bucharest's Faculty of Law, he continued in 1865 at the University of Paris, obtaining an undergraduate degree in Law the following years. He then studied Philology at Pisa, Florence, Rome and Naples, obtaining a Doctor of Letters in 1869.

Returning to Romania, he was prosecutor and then attorney at the Prahova County tribunal, a judge in Brăila, prosecutor in Focșani, and judge and general prosecutor at the Craiova court in 1873. In 1876, he was Prefect of Putna County, becoming general prosecutor at the Bucharest appeals court later that year.

In November 1878, following Romania's acquisition of Northern Dobruja, he was named prefect of the Constanța district, becoming the first prefect there under the new administration. In May 1881 he was also named prefect of Tulcea County, rendering him prefect over all Northern Dobruja. While in the province, he drafted and applied the law for its organisation, and pushed for the erection of Ovid's statue in Constanța.

He resigned in September 1881, moving to Bucharest. Later, he was elected to the Assembly of Deputies and to the Senate for Ialomița County, also working as an adviser to the High Court of Cassation and Justice.
