= Alexandru Orăscu =

Romanian architect

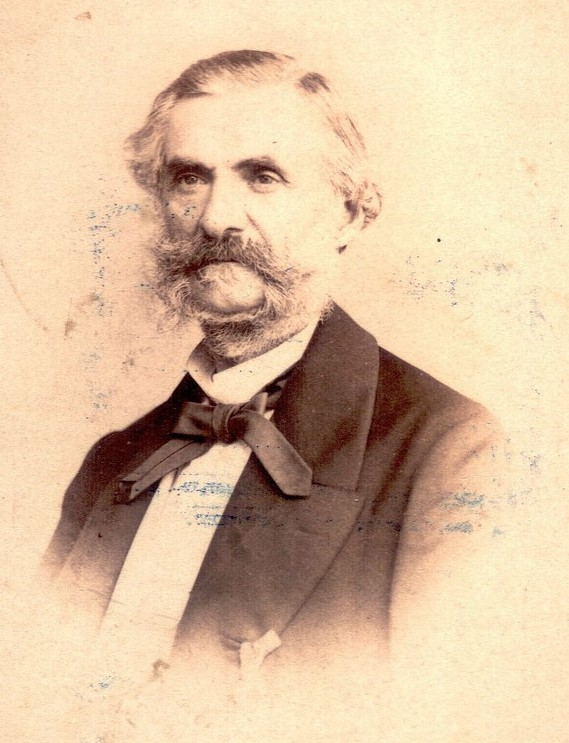
Orăscu in 1877

Alexandru Hristea Orăscu (30 July 1817 – 16 December 1894) was a Romanian architect famous for his Neoclassicist and Renaissance-revival works.

He was born in Bucharest in 1817 to serdar Hristea Orăscu and his wife, Elena Orăscu. He graduated from the Saint Sava High School in his native city. Upon recommendation from his mathematics teacher, Petrache Poenaru, Orăscu was hired in 1837 as aide to the chief architect of the city, a job he held until 1841. He then studied architecture in Berlin and Munich, obtaining his architect diploma in 1847.

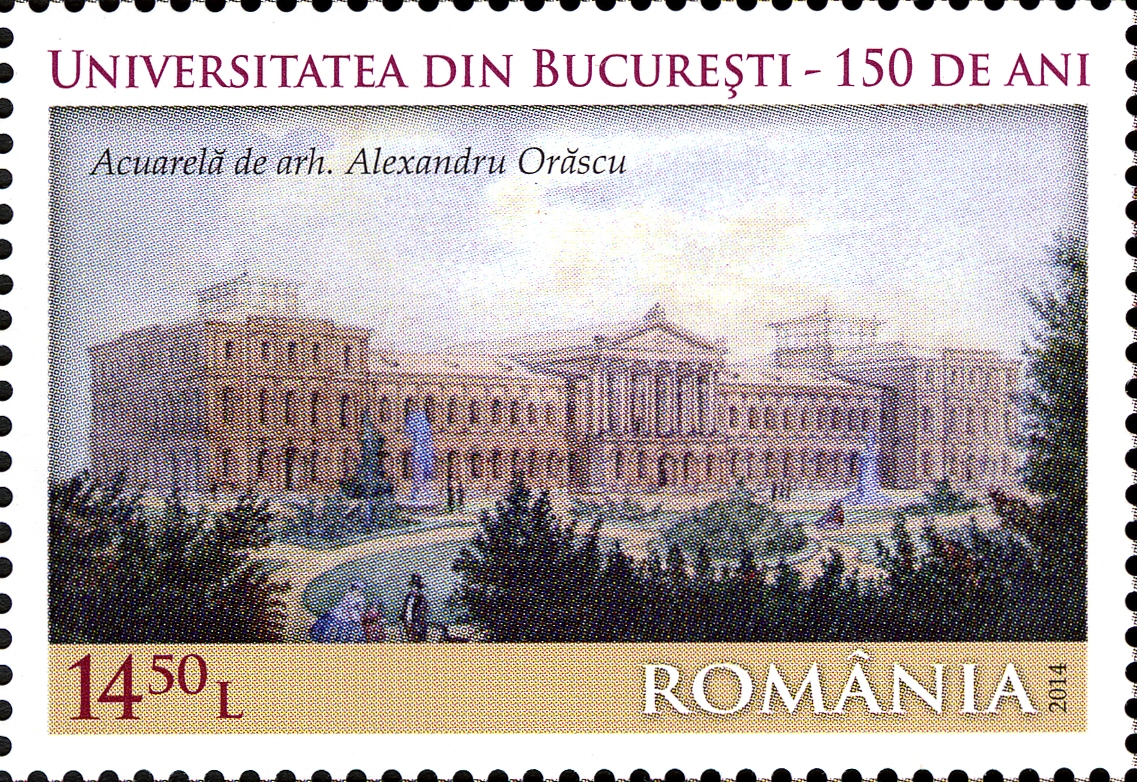
Watercolor by Orăscu depicting the University of Bucharest, on a stamp of Romania from 2014

He designed the initial building of the University of Bucharest (1837–1869), the Grand Hôtel du Boulevard in Bucharest (1865–1871), the Metropolitan Cathedral in Iași (1880–1887), the boys' gymnasium in Ploiești (1865–1866), the Carol I Hotel in Constanța (1879), and the Domnița Bălașa Church in Bucharest (1881–1885).

Orăscu was the president of the Romanian Architects’ Society, and served as rector of the University of Bucharest from 1885 to 1892. He died in Bucharest in 1894.

Streets in Sector 5 of Bucharest, Cisnădie, and Sibiu bear his name.
