= List of museums in Bucharest =

In Bucharest, Romania, there are memorial houses and museums. Most of them are memorial houses, art museums, or both.

== The list ==
Name	Image	Address	Type	Summary
Football Museum Bucharest	N/A	Strada Gabroveni 24, Old Town	First football museum in Eastern Europe	The Football Museum Bucharest, the first of its kind in the country and the only museum dedicated to football in Eastern Europe. The Football Museum stretches over 5 floors on Gabroveni Street in Bucharest’s Old Town, an area that gets a lot of foot traffic from tourists. It features a large collection of jerseys, balls, and medals connected to the history of football, many of them brought to the Romanian public for the first time ever. More than this, the museum has lots of interactive and multimedia experiences, e.g.: visitors can experience how to be Sports commentators, goalkeeper, etc.
Casa Memorială „Tudor Arghezi”		Strada Mărțișor 26	Memorial house	The house where the family of poet Tudor Arghezi (1880–1967) settled, starting with 1930
Ferestroika	N/A	Strada Ion Manolescu	Anthropology	An apartment furnished and decorated exactly like one of the Ceaușescu period, aiming to teleport you back to the 1980s
Museum of Senses		Bulevardul General Vasile Milea 4	Sense	The museum also has a collection of 40 exhibits, based on optical illusions, including stereograms, a nail bed, an upside-down room, a kaleidoscope, an Ames room, a room that seems infinite, and others. It is located inside the AFI Cotroceni mall, in the area where there is also a small roller coaster
National Museum of Romanian Aviation		Șoseaua Fabrica de Glucoză 2-4	Aeronautic	Moments from the history of Romanian aviation, the achievements in the aeronautical field, the major contribution that Romanians have had over time to the progress of world aviation, documents, models, and photographs related to the history of Romanian and world aeronautics
Museum of the National Bank of Romania		Strada Doamnei 8	Numismatic	It is one of the most valuable numismatic collections in Romania covering a period of over two and a half millennia, being exhibited among others the oldest coin minted in Romania today, and the smallest paper money printed in Romania
Museum of Romanian Railways		Calea Griviței 193B	Railway	Among the exhibits is the reconstituted set of the train that made its first journey on a railway in Romania, in October 1869
Museum of Art Collections		Calea Victoriei 111	Art	Works of modern Romanian art, Romanian folk art, paintings, graphics, sculpture, and decorative art of Western or Eastern origin
Curtea Veche Museum		Strada Franceză 25	History	The remains of the former Bucharest Citadel, which have withstood natural disasters and bad weather
Frederic Storck and Cecilia Cuțescu-Storck Art Museum		Strada Vasile Alecsandri 16	Art and memorial house	The home and studio of sculptor Frederic Storck and painter Cecilia Cuțescu-Storck, also including significant works by Frederic Storck's father, Karl Storck and others.
Nicolae Minovici Museum of Popular Art		Strada Doctor Nicolae Minovici 1	Art and memorial house	Within the museum can be admired several types of Romanian folk art pieces from all over Romania: icons, ceramics, fabrics, wooden objects, traditional musical instruments; and a documentary fund on the activity of Nicolae Minovici
Museum of Recent Art		Bulevardul Primăverii 15	Art	A permanent collection with the most representative Romanian works of art made from the 1960s until today
Vasile Grigore Art Museum	N/A	Strada Maria Rosetti 29	Art	It has exhibition spaces on two levels where the pieces are arranged in five rooms, representing seven large sections (painting, graphics, sculpture, Romanian folk art and European, Oriental, and Far Eastern decorative art).
Dumitru Minovici Museum of Old Western Art		Strada Doctor Nicolae Minovici 3	Art and memorial house	Inside you can admire various works of art, such as: stained glass windows from the XVI - XVII centuries, engravings, paintings, rare books, tapestries, carpets, and furniture
George Severeanu Museum		Strada Henri Coandă 26	Art, archaeology, numismatic, and memorial house	The museum is housed in the house that belonged to the radiologist George Severeanu and his wife Maria. In the museum is exhibited the numismatic and antiquities collection of the Severeanu spouses, which includes 11 ancient Egyptian antiquities, Greek and Etruscan vessels, Tanagra statuettes, Roman glassware and jewelry, İznik pottery, medieval documents, many coins (numismatics), and more
Gheorghe Tattarescu Museum		Strada Domnița Anastasia 7	Art and memorial house	It is hosted in the house where he lived and created for 40 years. Tattarescu and Theodor Aman were the founders of the School of Fine Arts in Bucharest
Ligia and Pompiliu Macovei Museum		Strada 11 Iunie 36-38	Art and memorial house	It is located in the private residence of the donors, in a building built in the early twentieth century, in French Eclectic style, the collection consists of works of art, represented by works signed by artists such as Theodor Pallady, Lucian Grigorescu, or Nicolae Tonitza
Dimitrie and Aurelia Ghiață Museum	N/A	Strada Doctor Louis Pasteur	Art and memorial	Memorial collection of paintings and drawings, as well as documents belonging to the painter Dumitru Ghiață (1888–1972), along with a large suite of decorative works of art, textiles and tapestry cards made by the artist's wife
Little Paris Museum		Strada Lipscani 41	Anthropology	The museum consists of several rooms with objects like those that were in the houses in Bucharest in the interwar period (when it was called Little Paris), trying to recreate the interiors specific to the period.
National Military Museum		Strada Mircea Vulcănescu 125-127	Military	
Bucharest Museum		Bulevardul Ion C. Brătianu 2	Anthropologic	The museum is housed in the Șuțu Palace. On the ground floor there are several rooms for temporary exhibitions. The collection includes clocks, old pictures, Neolithic art, old maps of Bucharest, furniture, and more
National Museum of Old Maps and Books		Strada Londra 39	Art and history	The museum's collection includes over 1000 maps, engravings, drawings, lithographs, as well as a series of objects specific to the museum's theme. The exhibits are arranged in a suite that respects the scientific side harmoniously combined with the artistic one, seeking to highlight the historical evolution of the cartographic achievements throughout the world and, especially, those that relate to space
National Museum of Romanian Literature		Strada Nicolae Crețulescu 8	Literature and memorial	The museum's collection consists of manuscripts and the first editions of important books from Romanian literature, and objects that belonged to the great writers, including furniture
National Museum of Firefighters		Bulevardul Ferdinand I 33		
Dimitrie Gusti National Village Museum		Șoseaua Pavel D. Kiseleff 28-30	Anthropology and architecture	The museum is composed of an area where there are many peasant houses and churches from various areas of Romania. Just like at the Romanian Peasant Museum, on the occasion of holidays such as Easter, Christmas, and the days of some saints, fairs are organized in which various artisans sell stalls on the streets of the museum of peasant art or home-made sweets.
Romanian Peasant Museum		Șoseaua Pavel D. Kiseleff 3	Anthropology	The collection includes pottery, folk clothing, interior fabrics, furniture, and more. just like at the Dimitrie Gusti National Village Museum, on the occasion of holidays such as Easter, Christmas, and the days of saints, fairs are organized in which various artisans sell at stalls on the streets of the museum of peasant art or home-made sweets.
National Cotroceni Museum		Bulevardul Geniului 1	History	Since 1991, the historical body of the palace has been open to visitors, becoming the Cotroceni Museum. In 2009, after extensive restoration works, the Cotroceni Church was also included in the museum route
National Museum of Art of Romania		Calea Victoriei 49-53	Art	It includes one of the largest collections of paintings in Romania, and medieval art (mainly Romanian)
National Museum of Contemporary Art		Strada Izvor 2-4 (part of the Palace of Parliament)	Art	Contemporary art, housed in a wing of the Palace of Parliament
Geology Museum		Șoseaua Pavel D. Kiseleff 2	Geology	The permanent exhibition consists of 14 basic exhibitions and contains approximately 7,700 exhibits out of a total of 70,000 samples in the museum's scientific collections.
National Museum of Romanian History		Calea Victoriei 12	History	The most important museum of history and archeology in Romania, both by size (developed area) and by heritage
Grigore Antipa National Museum of Natural History		Șoseaua Pavel D. Kiseleff 1	Natural history	The museum's collection consists of over 2 million pieces, grouped into different collections zoology, paleontology, minerals, rocks
Cantacuzino Palace		Calea Victoriei 141	Memorial house	Among the objects in the museum that belonged to the composer George Enescu are his first violin, which he received as a gift at the age of four, as well as some of the medals he obtained as a result of his contribution to World War I
Dimitrie Leonida Technical Museum		Strada General Candiano Popescu 2	Technical	It was founded in 1909 by Dimitrie Leonida, inspired by the Deutsches Museum
Romanian Kitsch Museum		Strada Soarelui	Kitsch	The museum's collection includes ceramic figurines (known in Romanian as bibelouri) from the period of Nicolae Ceaușescu, glass fish, carpets, and various other types of kitsch
Theodor Aman Museum		Strada C. A. Rosetti 8	Art and memorial house	It includes a memorial collection of paintings, graphics and sculpture, working tools, furniture, and other objects that belonged to the painter and graphic artist Theodor Aman (1831-1891)
Theodor Pallady Museum		Strada Spătarului 22	Art	The museum has some remarkable paintings by the great Romanian painter Theodor Pallady, as well as a batch of over 800 drawings (landscapes, nudes, portraits, interiors), representative of Pallady's Parisian period. They are exhibited periodically in thematic series
Age Museum		Calea Victoriei 151	Anthropology and decorative arts	The theme of the museum is the evolution of the relations between the generations in the last three hundred years, for the Romanian urban environment, having Bucharest as a case study. It is a projection of what a day in our life would have looked like, from the 18th century to the present. And especially, about how this symbolic day in history has evolved with each generation. The museum's collection includes clothes, various examples of decorative arts, furniture, household items, collections of porcelain, glass and metals, things that reflect the evolution of technology, home music, etc., through them being presented the evolution of everyday life
Victor Babeș Museum		Strada Andrei Mureșanu 14A	Memorial house	The museum is housed in the house of bacteriologist and morphopathologist Victor Babeș, the collection containing things that belonged to him
Zambaccian Museum		Strada Zambacian 21A	Art and memorial museum	The collection includes paintings, sculptures, graphics, and furniture. Among them is a collection of works by Romanian artists, including a portrait of Krikor H. Zambaccian, painted by Corneliu Baba, as well as works by several French impressionists
Bucharest Observatory		Bulevardul Lascăr Catargiu 21	Observatory	The only public observatory in Bucharest. The collection includes several refracting telescopes and astronomical telescopes
Palace of the Parliament		Strada Izvor 2-4	Administrative building	It is the heaviest building in the world, the third largest administrative building in the world, and the most expensive administrative building in the world. It is the seat of the Parliament of Romania and offers guided tours. In addition, it houses the National Museum of Contemporary Art and the Museum of the Palace.
Primăverii Palace		Bulevardul Primăverii 50	Memorial house	The residence in Bucharest of Nicolae and Elena Ceaușescu
Jewish Museum		Strada Mămulari 3	Jewish museum	An important archive of the history of Romanian Jews, housed in a well-restored former synagogue. Includes paintings of and by Romanian Jews, and costumes from the State Jewish Theater.
