= Museum of Art Collections =

Branch of the National Museum of Art of Romania

- Muzeul Colecțiilor de Artă
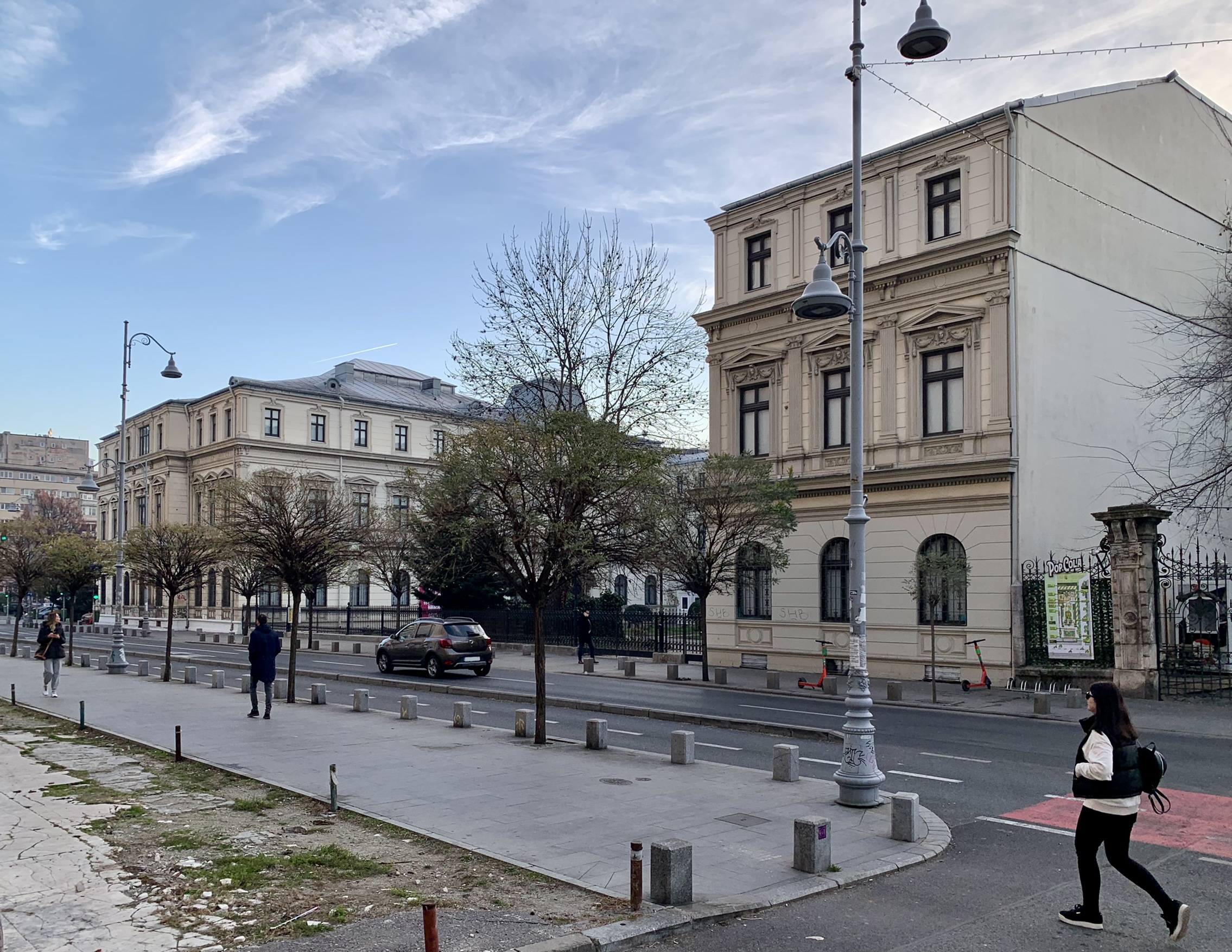
- The Museum of Art Collections in January 2023
- Location: 111 Calea Victoriei, Bucharest, Romania
- Coordinates: 44°26′40.33″N 26°5′29.00″E
- Type: art museum
- Website: mnar.ro/en/museum-of-art-collections

The Museum of Art Collections (Romanian: Muzeul Colecțiilor de Artă) is a branch of the National Museum of Art of Romania and is situated in Bucharest. It is located on Calea Victoriei no. 111 at the corner of Calea Griviței, in Romanit Palace, the first section of which was built in 1822.

The museum contains 44 collections donated to the Romanian State beginning with 1927 by the families of: Hurmuz Aznavorian, Dumitru and Maria Ștefănescu, Josefina and Eugen Taru, Emanoil Romulus Anca and Ortansa Dinulescu Anca, Garabet Avakian, Mircea Petrescu and Artemiza Petrescu, Sandu Lieblich, Sică Alexandrescu, Clara and Anatol E. Baconsky, Sorin Schächter, Céline Emilian, Marcu Beza, Hortensia and Vasile Beza, Alexandra and Barbu Slătineanu, Béatrice and Hrandt Avakian.

The collection includes various pieces from Asia and the Middle East, and several pieces by Western European artists (including one drawing by Vincent van Gogh, but the heart of the collection consists of work of late 19th- and 20th-century Romanian artists, including Theodor Aman, Nicolae Grigorescu, Ioan Andreescu, Nicolae Tonitza, Gheorghe Petrașcu, Theodor Pallady, Lucian Grigorescu, Iosif Iser, Camil Ressu, Francisc Șirato, Alexandru Ciucurencu, Dumitru Ghiață, and Corneliu Baba. The museum lapidarium hosts stone carved items of old Romanian art, among which a few pieces extracted from Văcărești Monastery, demolished in 1986 at Nicolae Ceaușescu's order.

The museum officially reopened in June 2013.

== Romanit Palace ==
The original portion of Romanit Palace (Romanian: Palatul Romanit) was erected for the early 19th-century boyar C. Faca at the corner of Calea Victoriei (then Podul Mogoșoaiei) and Calea Griviței (then Podul Târgoviștei). Faca died before it was completed, and it was sold to a Greek named Romanit. The Romanian writer Ion Ghica (1816–1897) wrote about the luxurious interior in his memoir: "... the walls of all the chambers stuccoed, imitating the rarest and most beautiful marble, the ceilings of a rare wealth and taste... The chambers all winter bedding with rich carpets from Usack and Agem and in summer with fine mats from India; coverings and thick silk curtains from Damascus and Aleppo. Chairs and sofas, all mahogany and ebony, inlaid with mother-of-pearl, and gilded bronze figures dressed in Cordova leather. In all the chambers, chandeliers hung from ceilings with garlands between doors and windows, all of Venetian crystal."

After Romanit died in 1834, the building was rented 1834–1842 by Prince (domnitor) Alexandru II Ghica, who established a chancery there, where people could come to register complaints. In 1836, the building was purchased by the State, used first as an administrative office for the Court but in the second half of the 19th century as the seat of the Ministry of Finance. As the Ministry came to need more space, the two wings were added, leading to the 'U' shape of the building today.

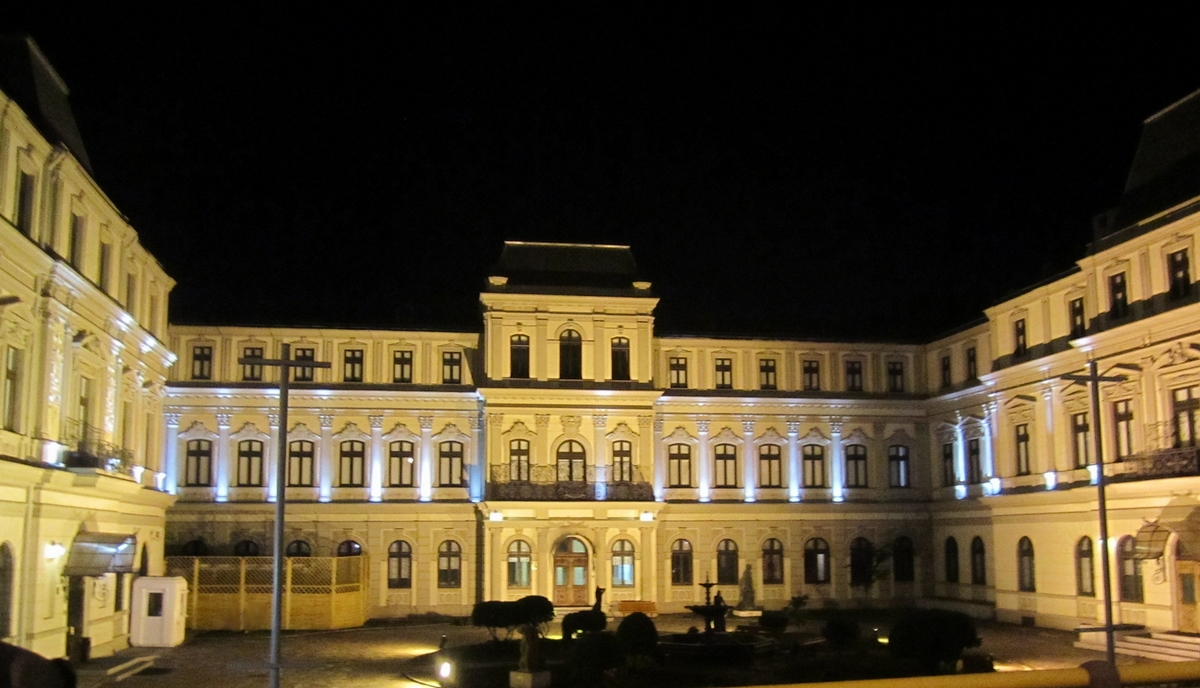

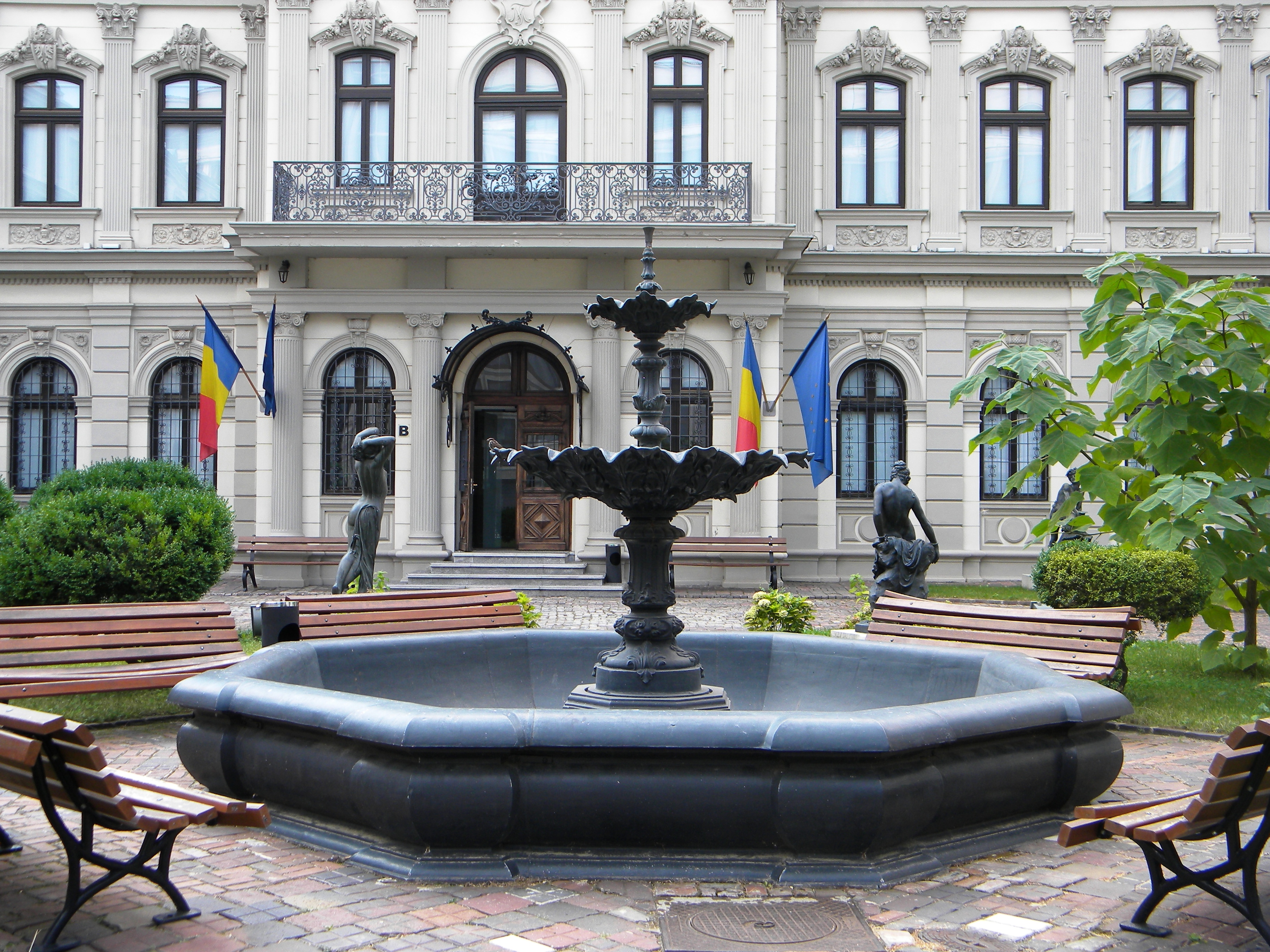

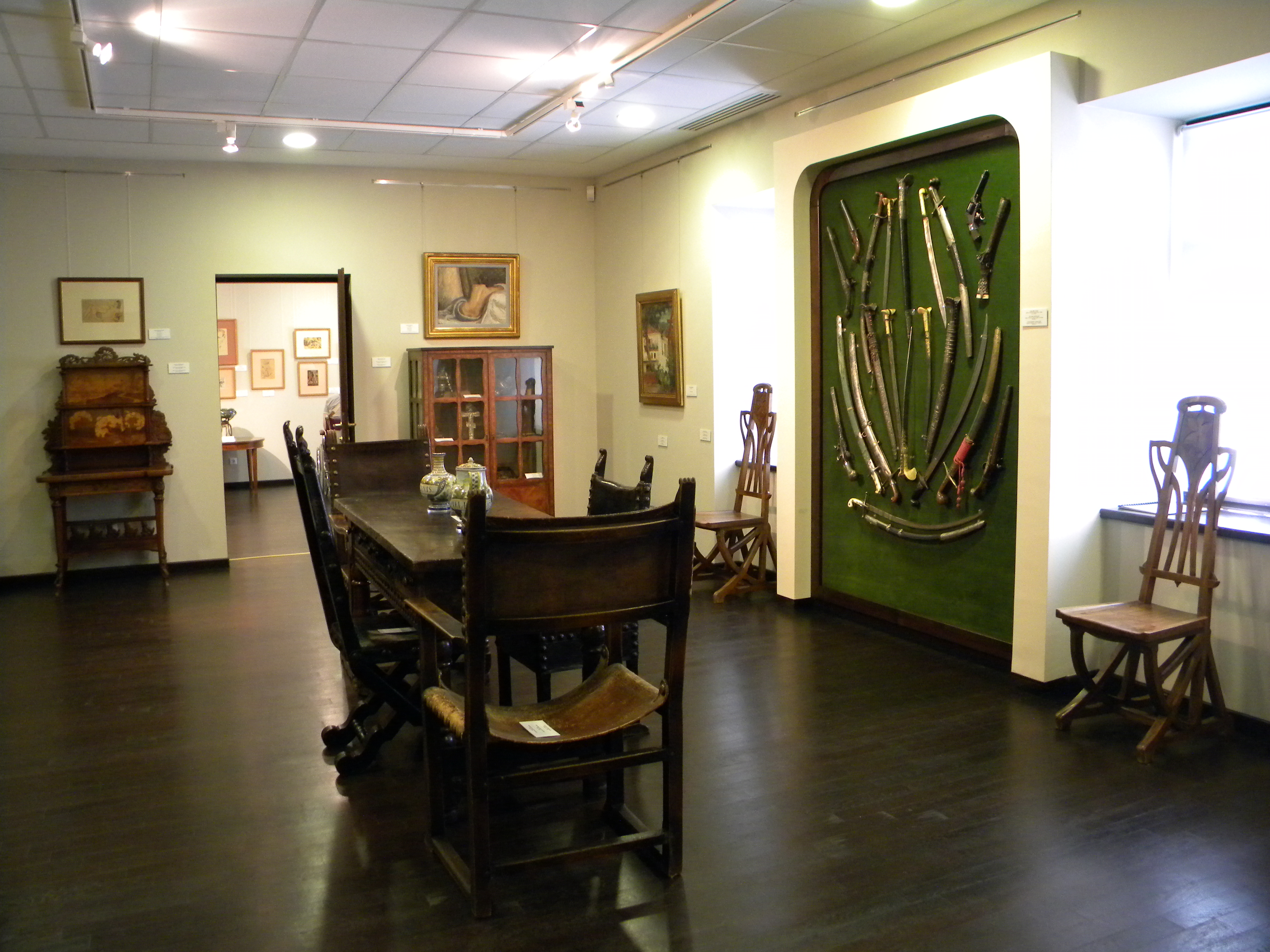

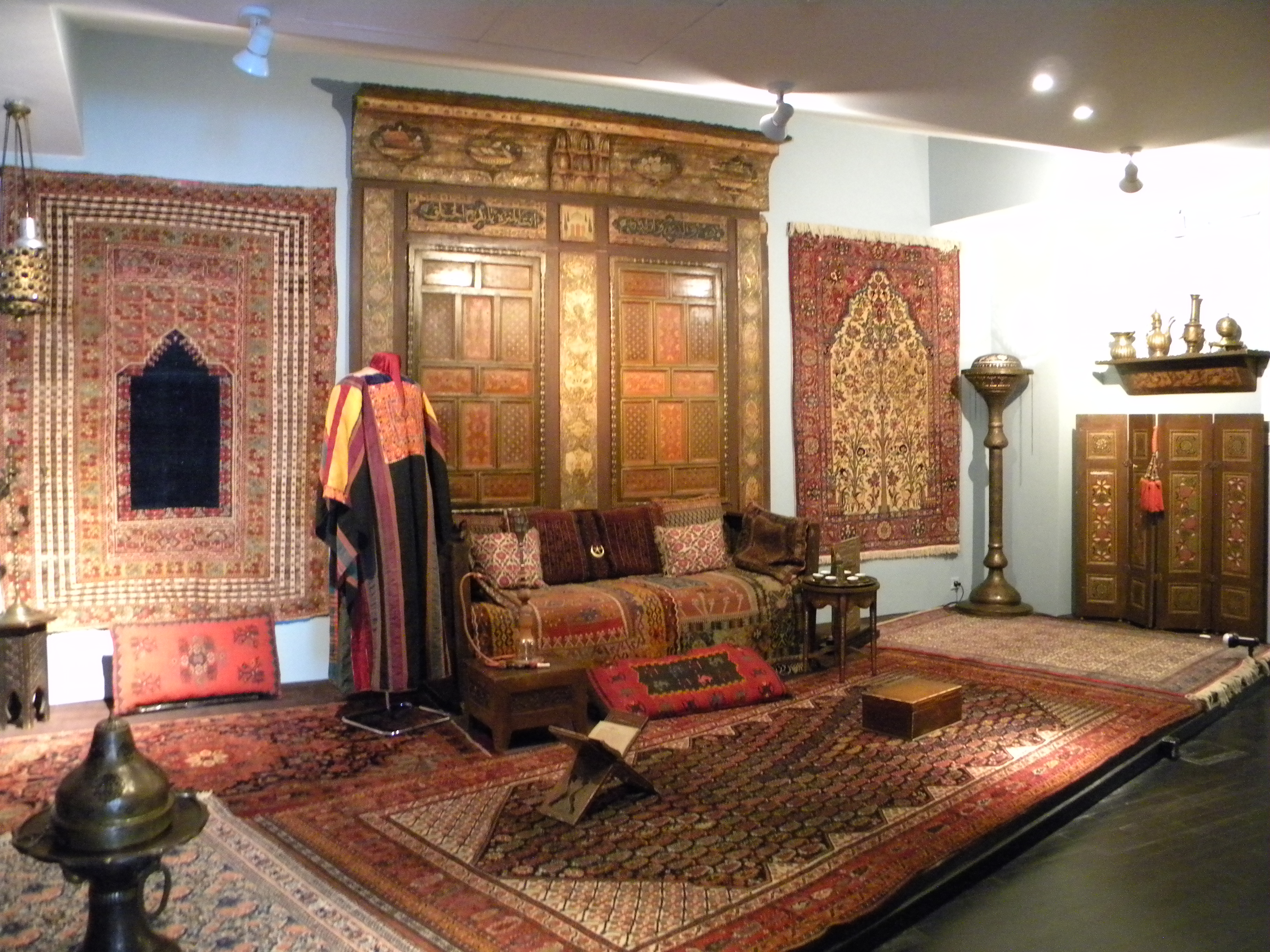

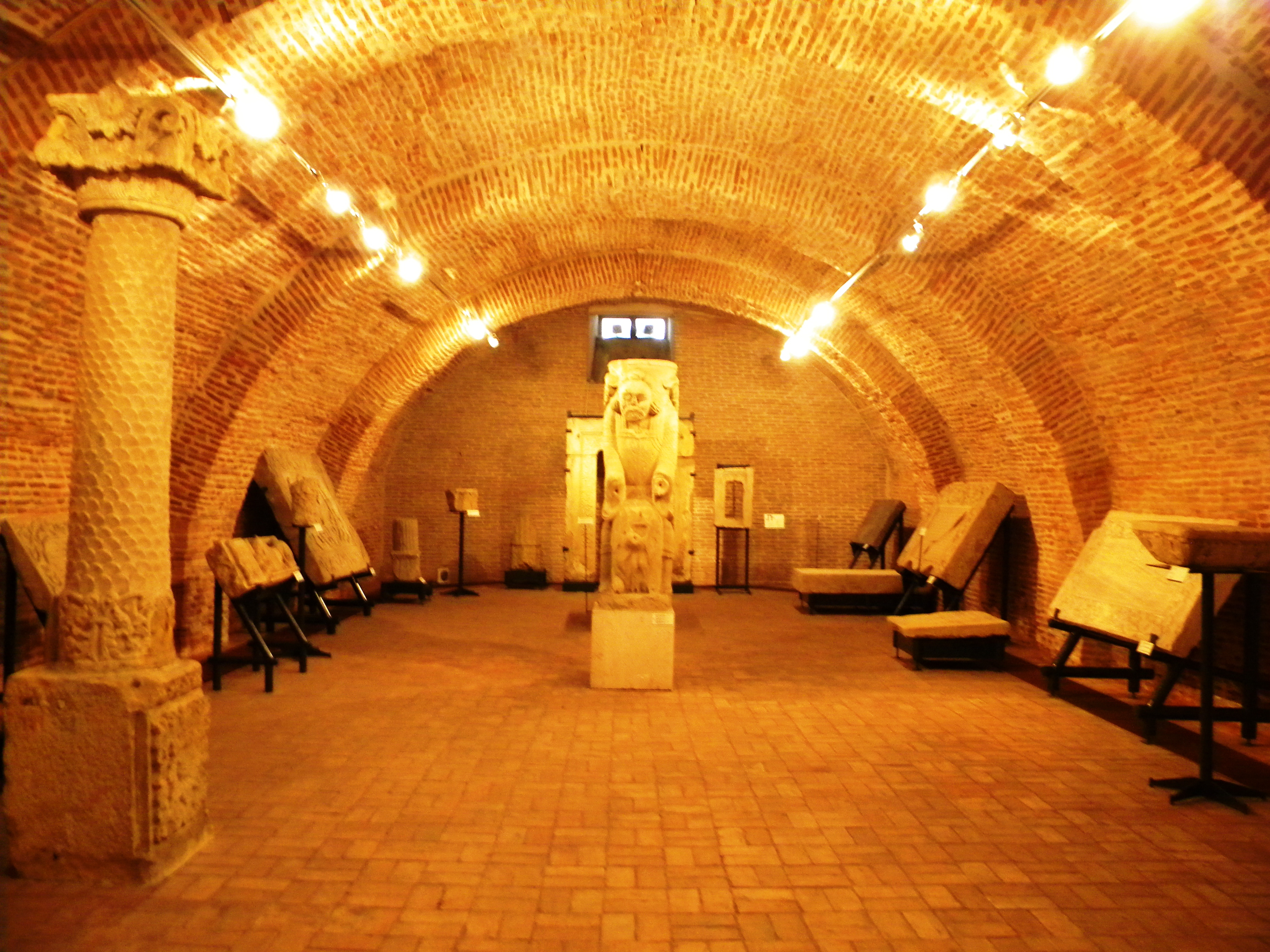

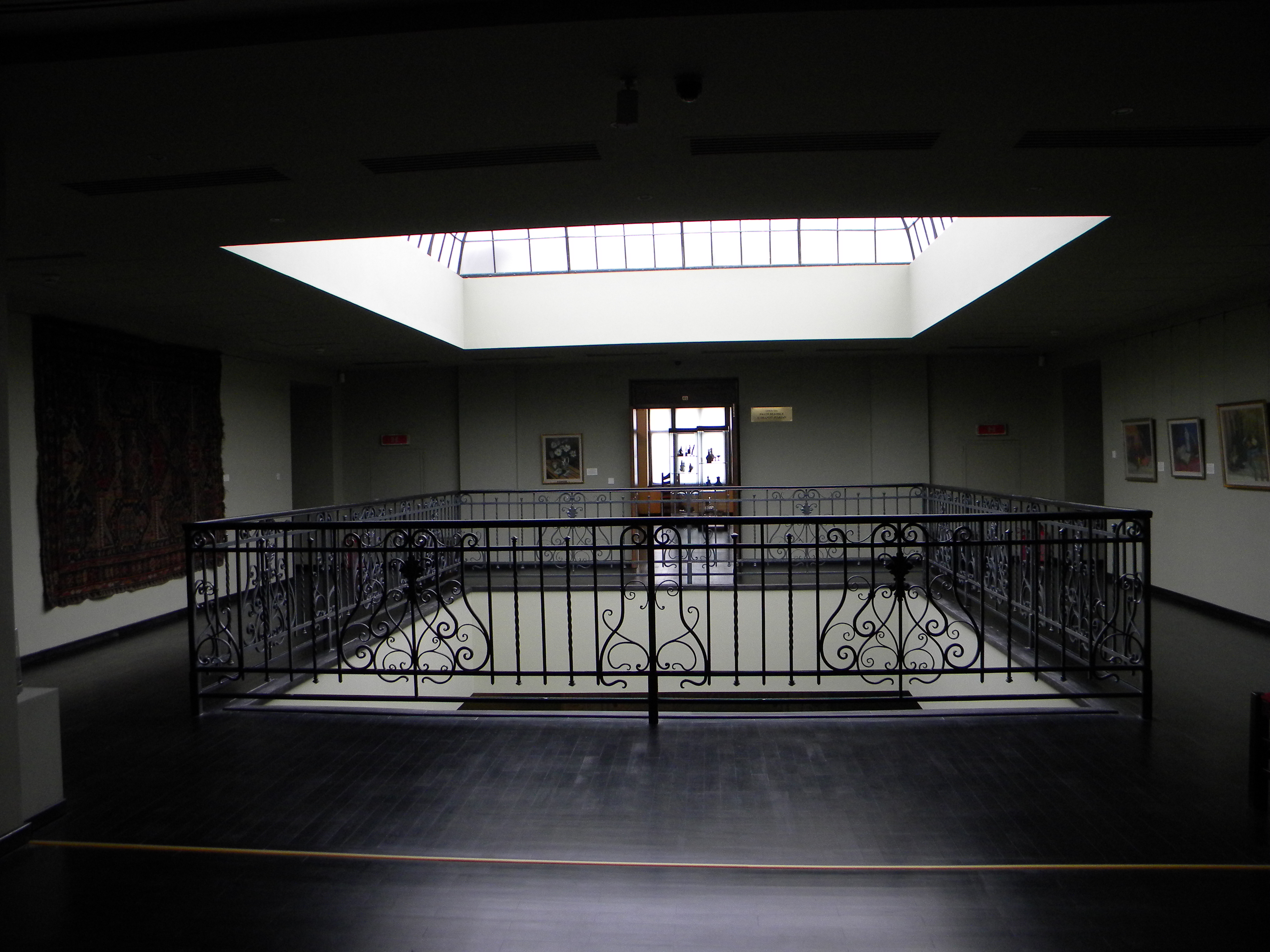

== Satellite museums ==
The Museum of Art Collections also administers two satellite museums, the Zambaccian Museum and the Theodor Pallady Museum.
