= National Museum of Contemporary Art =

National Museum of Contemporary Art may refer to:

- National Museum of Contemporary Art, Athens (Greece)
- National Museum of Contemporary Art (Portugal)
- National Museum of Contemporary Art (Romania)
- National Museum of Modern and Contemporary Art (South Korea)
