= Zambaccian Museum =

Museum in Bucharest, Romania

Coordinates: 44°27′39″N 26°05′28″E

The Zambaccian Museum in Bucharest, Romania is a museum in the former home of Krikor Zambaccian (1889 –1962), a businessman and art collector. The museum was founded in the Dorobanți neighbourhood in 1947, closed by the Nicolae Ceaușescu regime in 1977, and re-opened in 1992. It is now a branch of The National Museum of Art of Romania. Its collection includes works by Romanian artists—including a masterful portrait of Zambaccian himself by Corneliu Baba—and works by several French impressionists. It is located not far from Piața Dorobanților on a street now renamed after Zambaccian.

At the time the museum was founded, the act of donation stated that it must be housed in Zambaccian's former home. However, after the 1977 Bucharest earthquake (which did no detectable damage to the museum building), the Romanian government created the Museum of Art Collections, consolidating many of the city's smaller museums (and a good number of expropriated private collections). The Zambaccian collection still resided at the Museum of Art Collections at the time of the Romanian Revolution of 1989; it was returned to its historic location in 1992.

Artists in the collection include Romanians Ion Andreescu, Corneliu Baba, Apcar Baltazar, Henri Catargi, Alexandru Ciucurencu, Horia Damian, Nicolae Dărăscu, Lucian Grigorescu, Nicolae Grigorescu, Iosif Iser, Ștefan Luchian, Samuel Mützner, Alexandru Padina, Theodor Pallady, Gheorghe Petrașcu, Vasile Popescu, Camil Ressu, and Nicolae Tonitza, and French artists Pierre Bonnard, Paul Cézanne—the museum has the only Cézanne in Romania—, Jean-Baptiste-Camille Corot, Eugène Delacroix, André Derain, Raoul Dufy, Albert Marquet, Henri Matisse, Camille Pissarro, Pierre-Auguste Renoir, and Maurice Utrillo, as well as pieces by two other artists who worked in France, the Spaniard Pablo Picasso and the Englishman Alfred Sisley.

The courtyard features a large sculpture by Romanian sculptor Oscar Han; other sculptors with works in the collection are Constantin Brâncuși, Cornel Medrea, Milița Petrașcu, Dimitrie Paciurea, and Frederic Storck. Storck's own former home, also in the north end of Bucharest, is also now a museum.
