= National Museum of Art of Romania =

Museum in Bucharest, Romania

Coordinates: 44°26′24.58″N 26°5′43.92″E

- Muzeul Național de Artă al României
- Established: 1948
- Location: Royal Palace, Bucharest, Romania
- Type: Art museum
- Accreditation: National Network of Museums of Romania
- Collection size: 70,000
- Director: Erwin Kessler
- Owner: Ministry of Culture of Romania
- Public transit access: RATB, Bucharest Metro

The National Museum of Art of Romania (Romanian: Muzeul Național de Artă al României) is located in the Royal Palace in Revolution Square, central Bucharest. It features collections of medieval and modern Romanian art, as well as the international collection assembled by the Romanian royal family.

The exhibition "Shadows and Light" ran from 15 July to 2 October 2005. With four centuries of French art, it was the largest exhibition of French painting in Central and Eastern Europe since 1945. 77 works were exhibited, including masterpieces by painters such as Poussin, Chardin, Ingres, David, Delacroix, Corot, Cézanne, Matisse, Picasso, and Braque.

== History ==
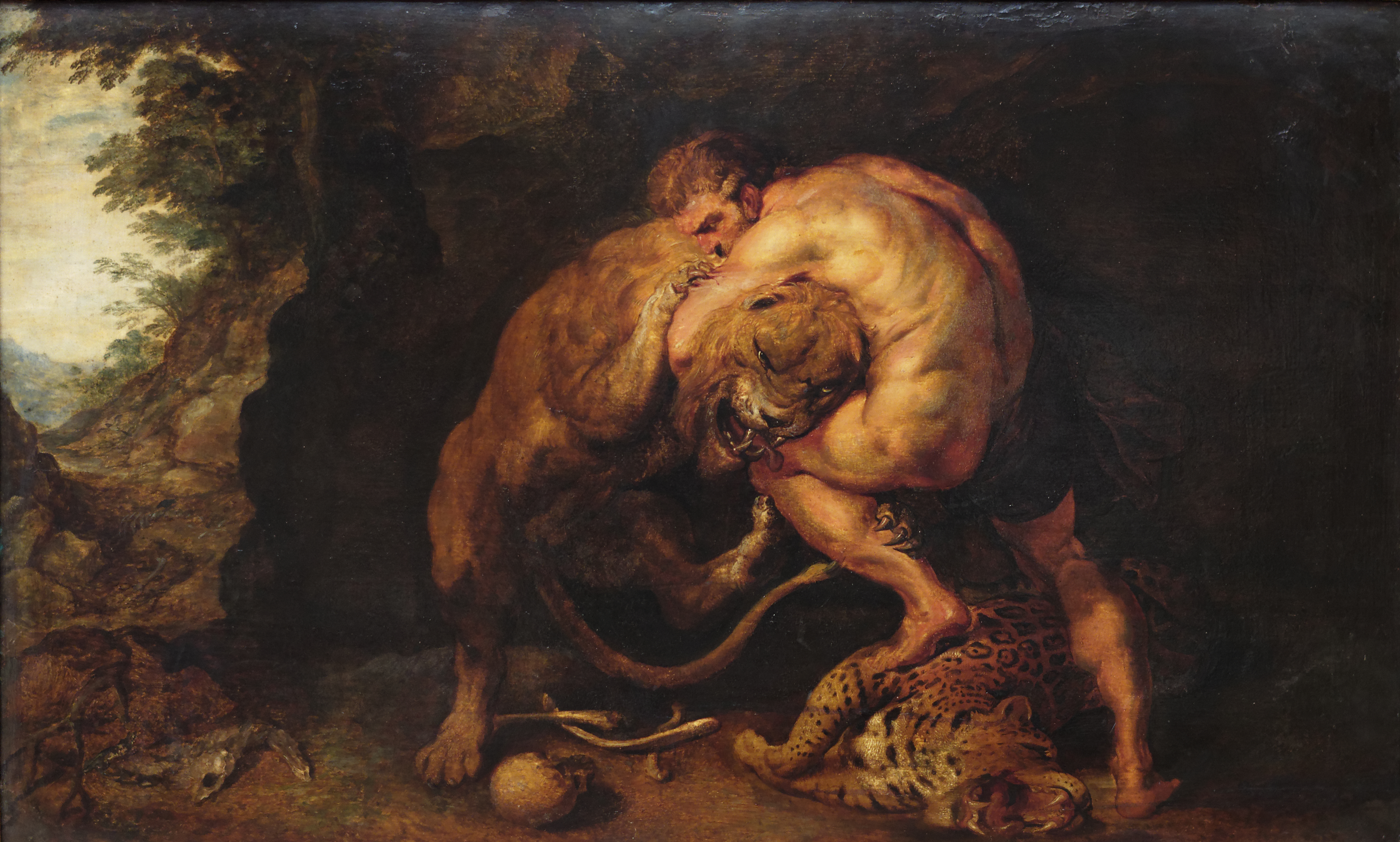
Hercules fight with the Nemean lion, Pieter Paul Rubens

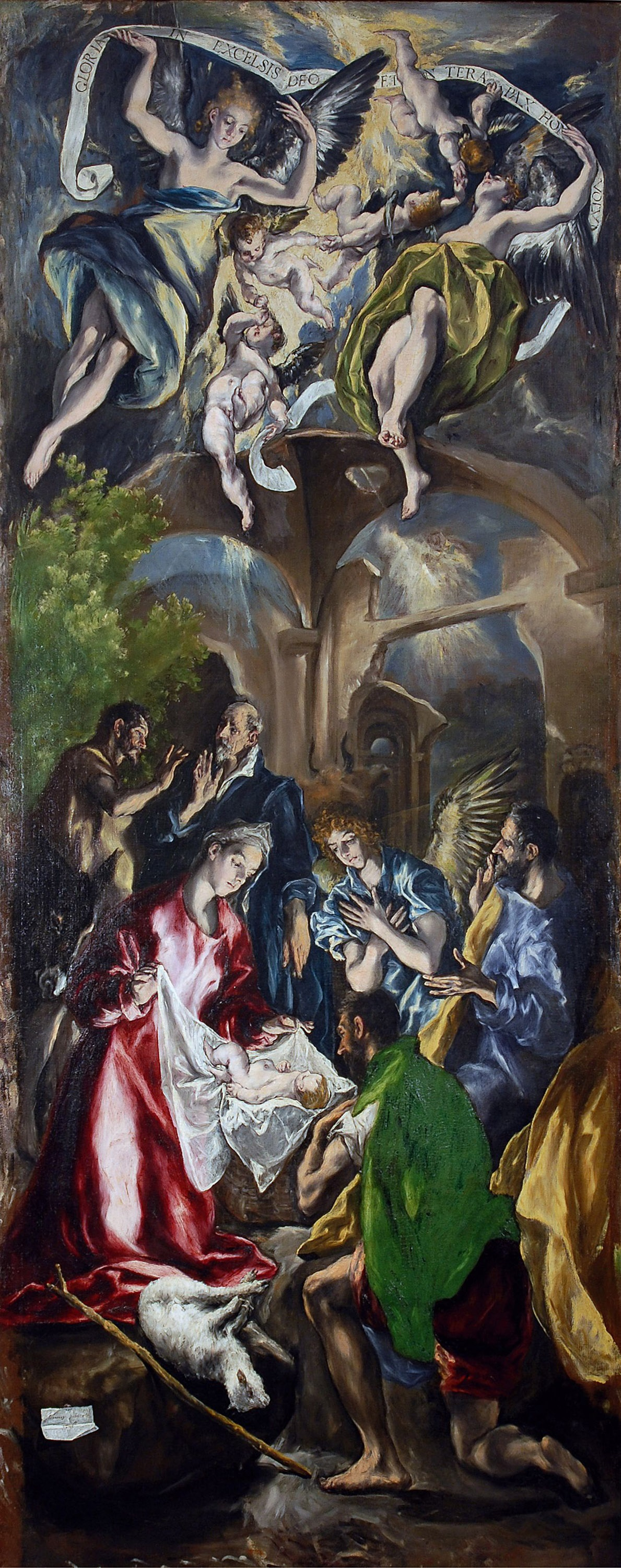
The Adoration of the Shepherds, El Greco, 1600

The museum was damaged during the 1989 Romanian Revolution that led to the downfall of Nicolae Ceaușescu. In 2000, part of the museum reopened to the public, housing the modern Romanian collection and the international collection; the comprehensive Medieval art collection, which now features works salvaged from monasteries destroyed during the Ceaușescu era, reopened in spring 2002. There are also two halls that house temporary exhibits.

The modern Romanian collection features sculptures by Constantin Brâncuși and Dimitrie Paciurea, as well as paintings by Theodor Aman, Nicolae Grigorescu, Theodor Pallady, Gheorghe Petrașcu, and Gheorghe Tattarescu.

The international collection includes works by Old Masters such as Domenico Veneziano, El Greco, Tintoretto, Jan van Eyck, Jan Brueghel the Elder, Peter Paul Rubens, and Rembrandt, plus a smattering of works by impressionists such as Claude Monet and Alfred Sisley. Among the best known Old Master works in the collection are Jacopo Amigoni's portrait of the singer Farinelli, a Crucifixion by Antonello da Messina, and Alonso Cano's Christ at the Column.

== Exhibitions ==
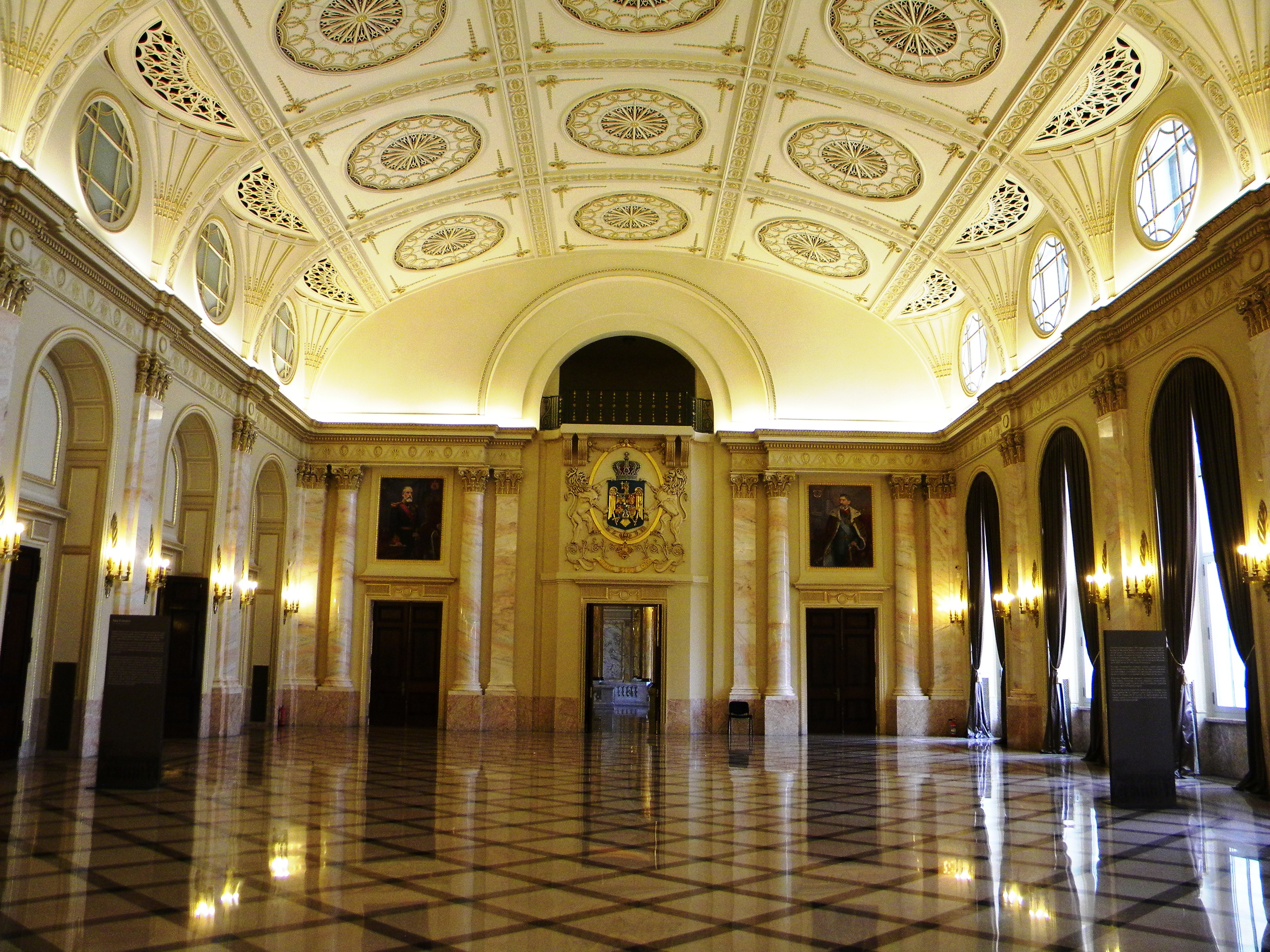
The Throne Room

In the southern part of the building the European Art Gallery was reopened in 2000. The painting collection was made available on the basis of 214 works of art from the collection of King Carol I, to which were added pictures of other members of the royal family. The king's collection included paintings by El Greco, Rembrandt, Bruegel the Elder, Rubens, and Domenico Veneziano.

In spring 2001, the Romanian Modern Art Gallery reopened. The paintings are displayed on the mezzanine and second floor wing of the building. Early Romanian paintings are exhibited on the mezzanine (Nicolae Polcovnicul, Eustație Altini, Anton Chladek, Niccolò Livaditti, Giovanni Schiavoni, Carol Wallenstein de Vella, Constantin Daniel Rosenthal, Ion Negulici, Constantin Lecca, Carol Szathmari), along with portraits of family members and a few landscapes.

In the Modern Romanian Section, the following painters are also represented:

- Nicolae Grigorescu
- Stefan Luchian
- Cecilia Cuțescu-Storck
- Nicolae Tonitza
- Herman Maxy
- Victor Brauner

Other noteworthy non-Romanian paintings are:

- Bernardino Licinio's "Return of Prodigal Son"
- Hans von Aachen's "3 Graces"
- Aegidius Sadeler's "Hall of Hradcany"
- Bartholomäus Zeitblom's "Saint Barbara"
- Claude Monet's "Camille in Green Dress"
- Paul Signac's "Gate"

=== Gallery ===
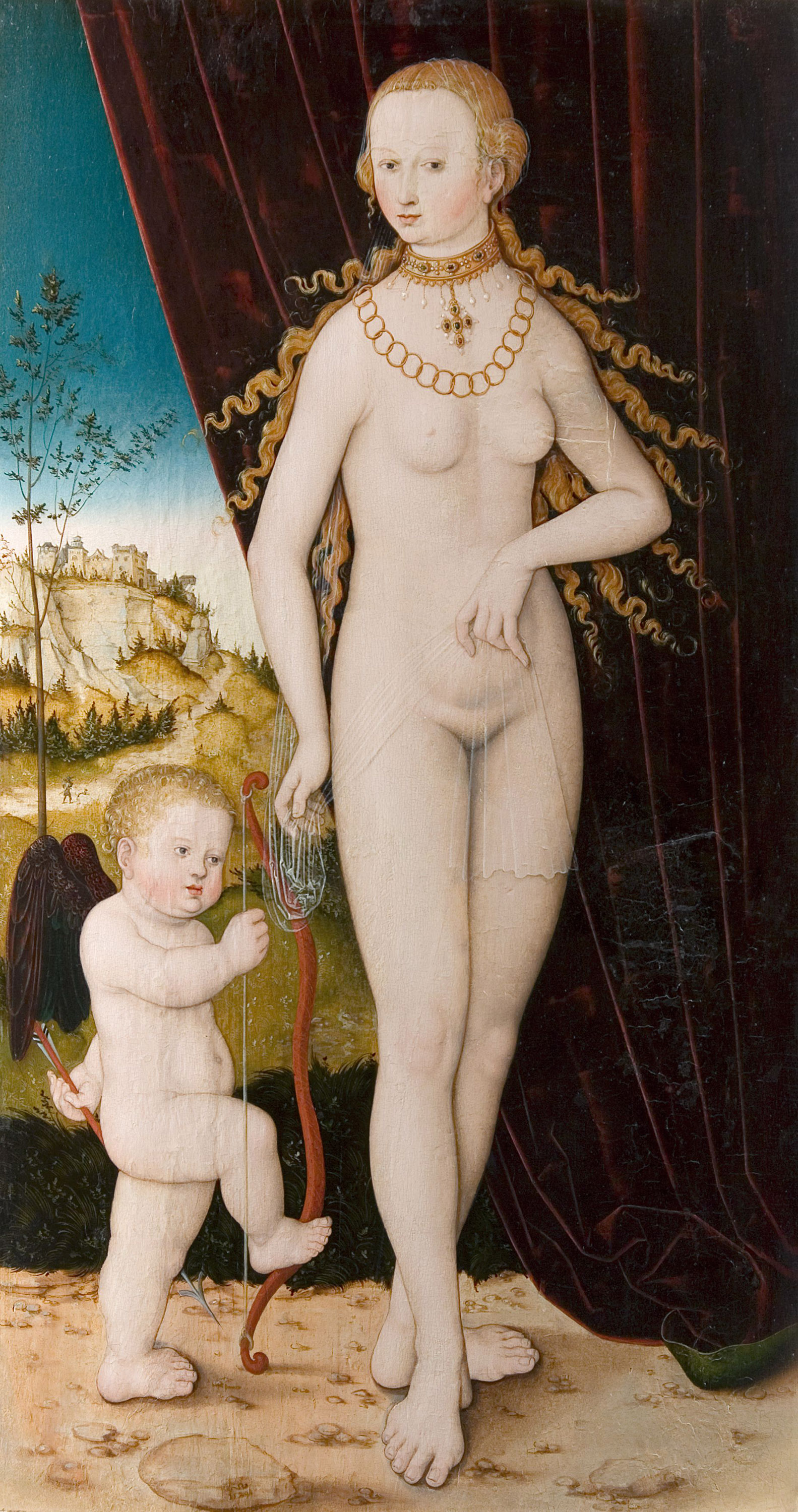
Venus and Amor, Lucas Cranach the Elder, 1520

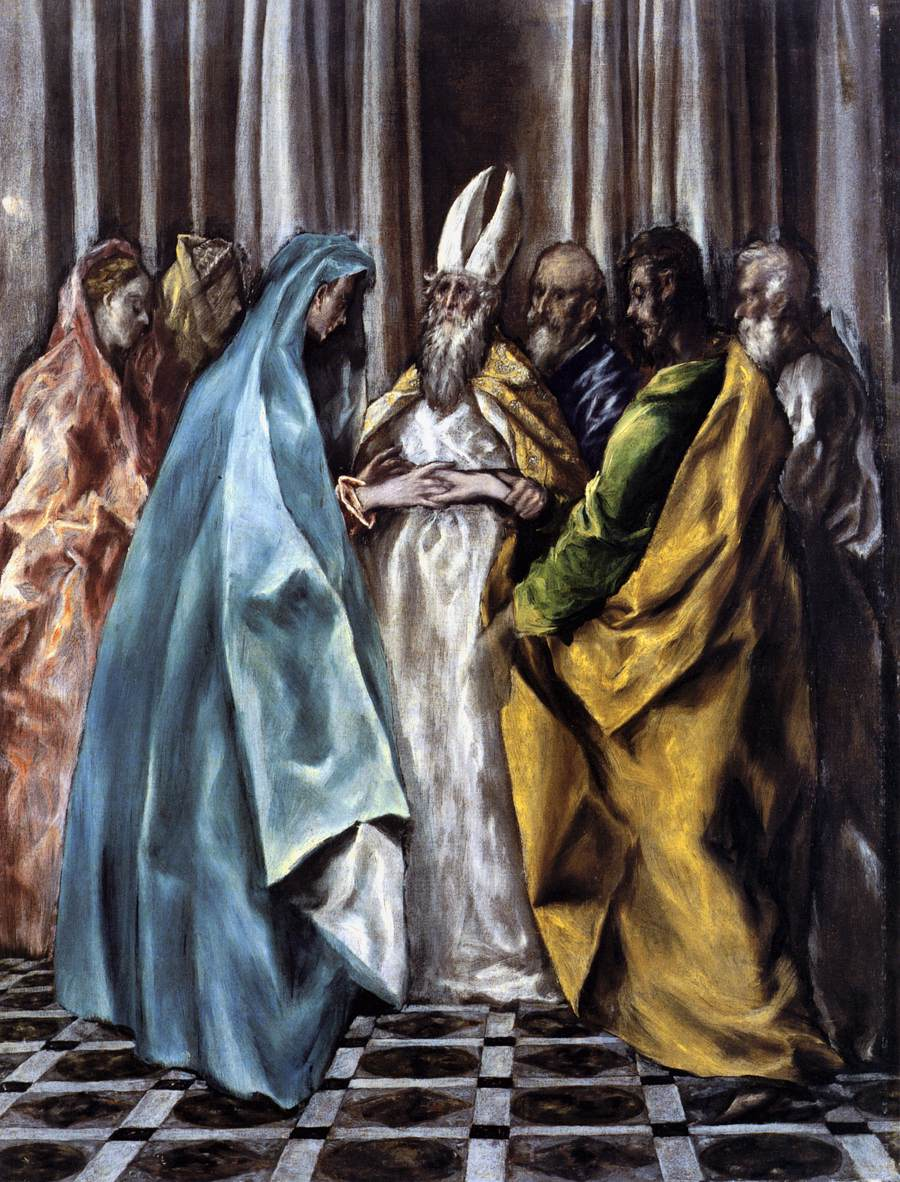
The Marriage of the Virgin , El Greco, 1614

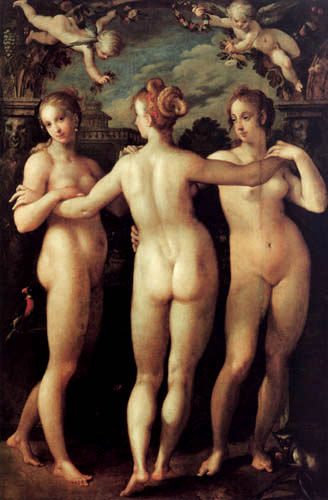
The three Graces, Hans von Aachen, 1604

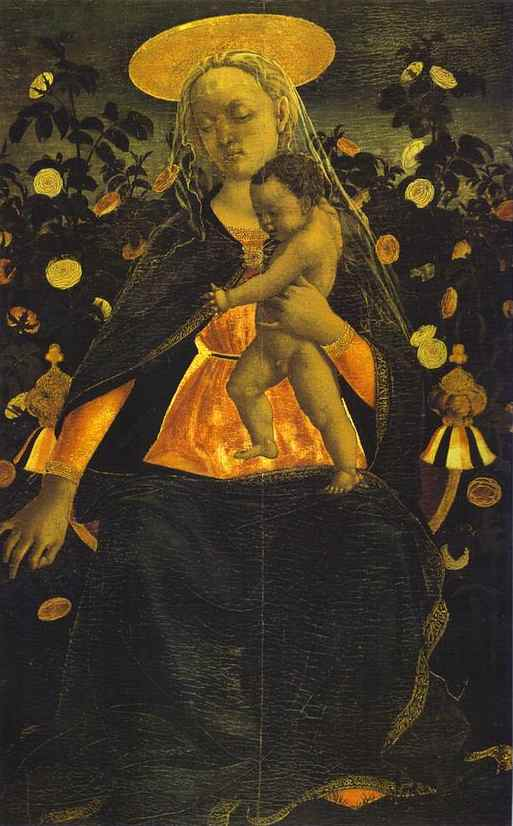
Our Lady and the Child, Domenico Veneziano,

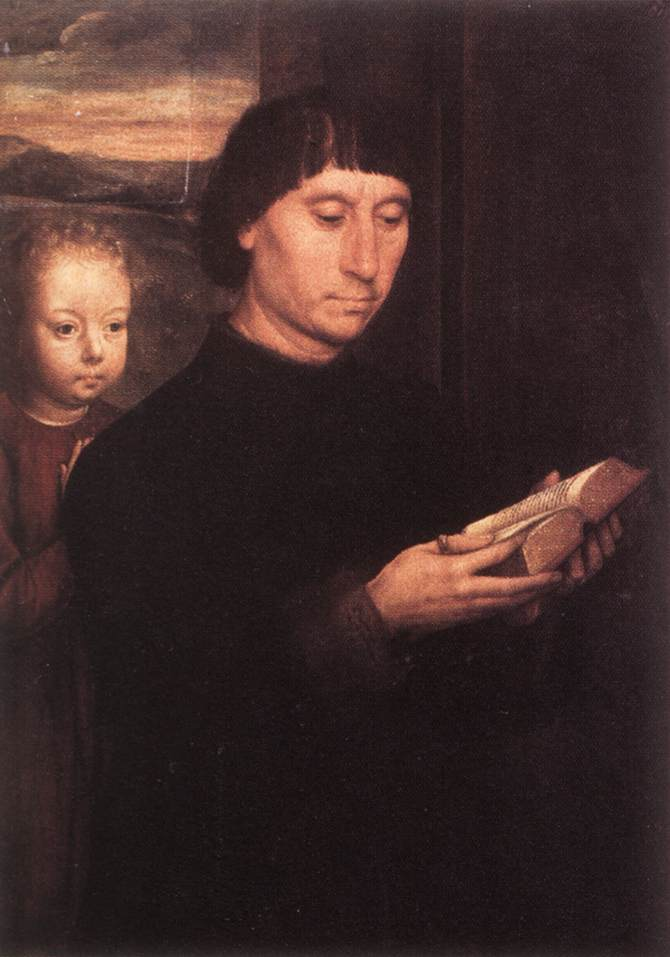
Donor, Hans Memling, 1490

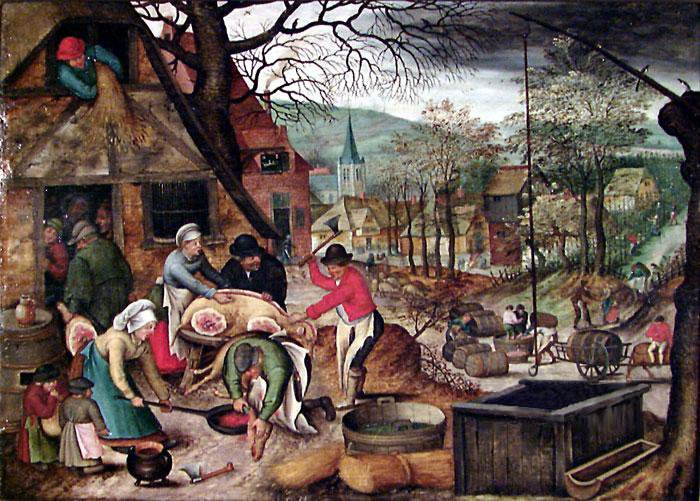
The Four Seasons - Autumn by Pieter Brueghel the Younger

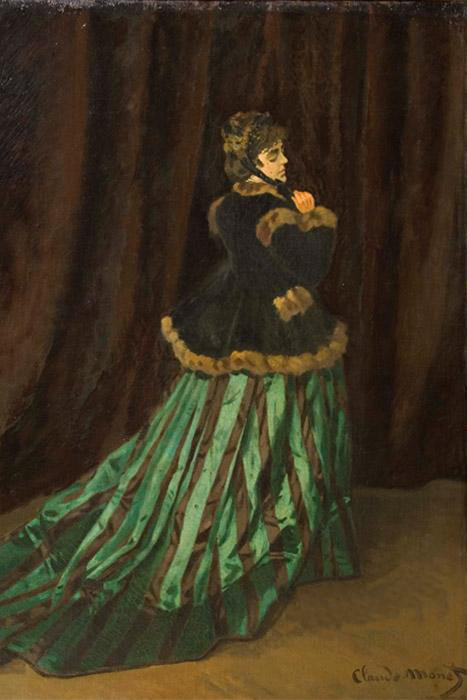
Green robe, Claude Monet, 1866

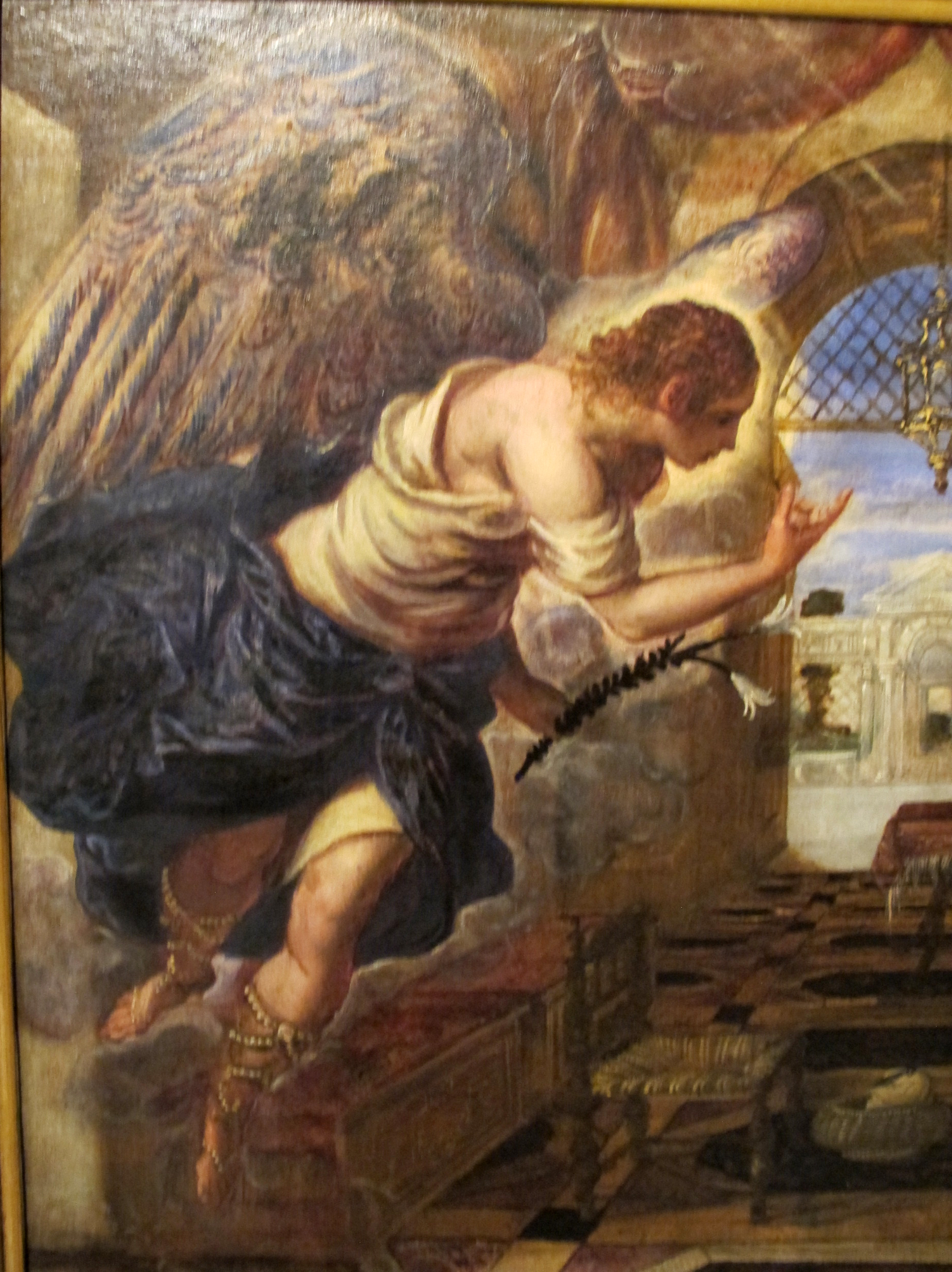
The Annunciation by Tintoretto

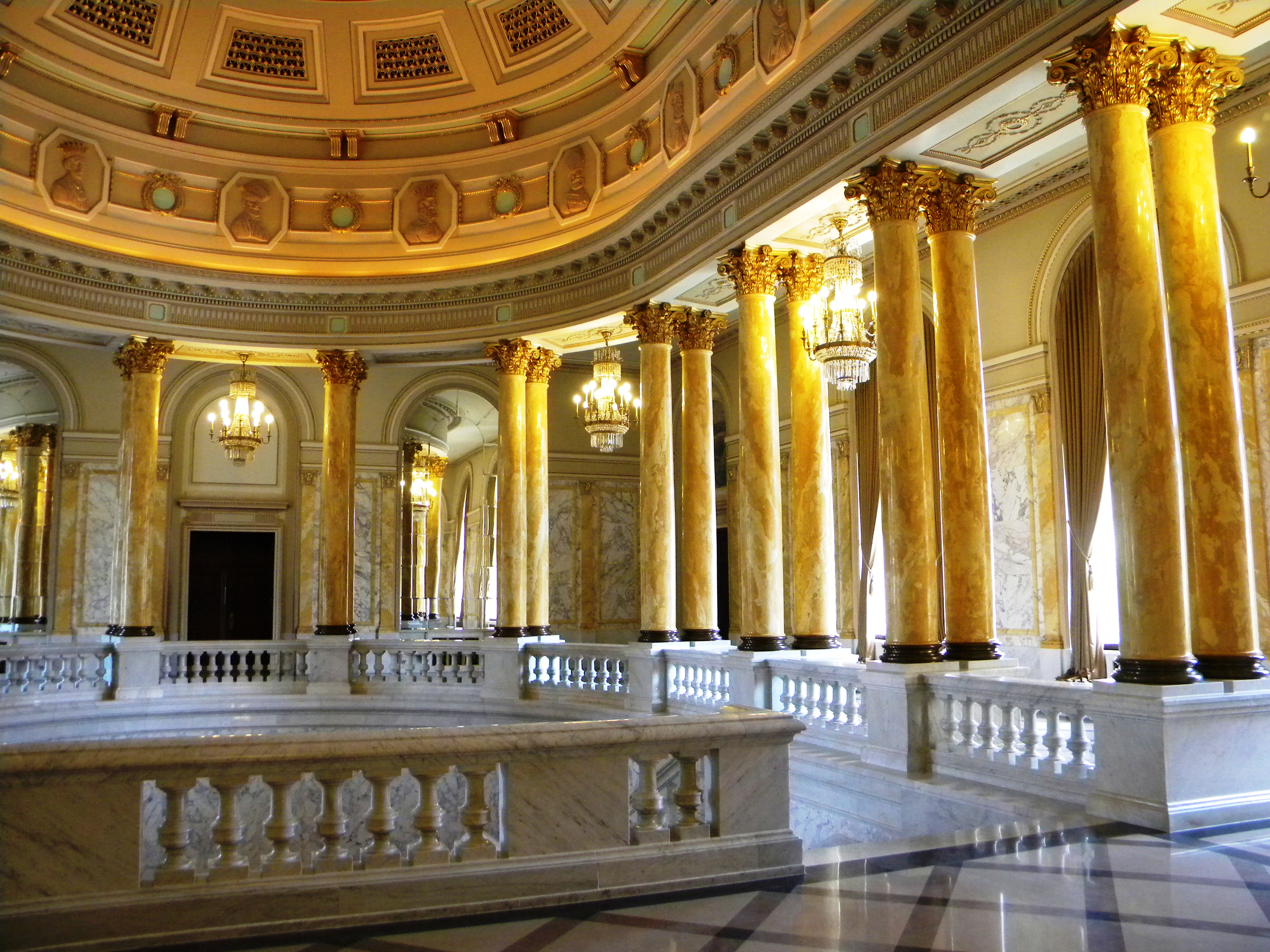
Throne room pavilion

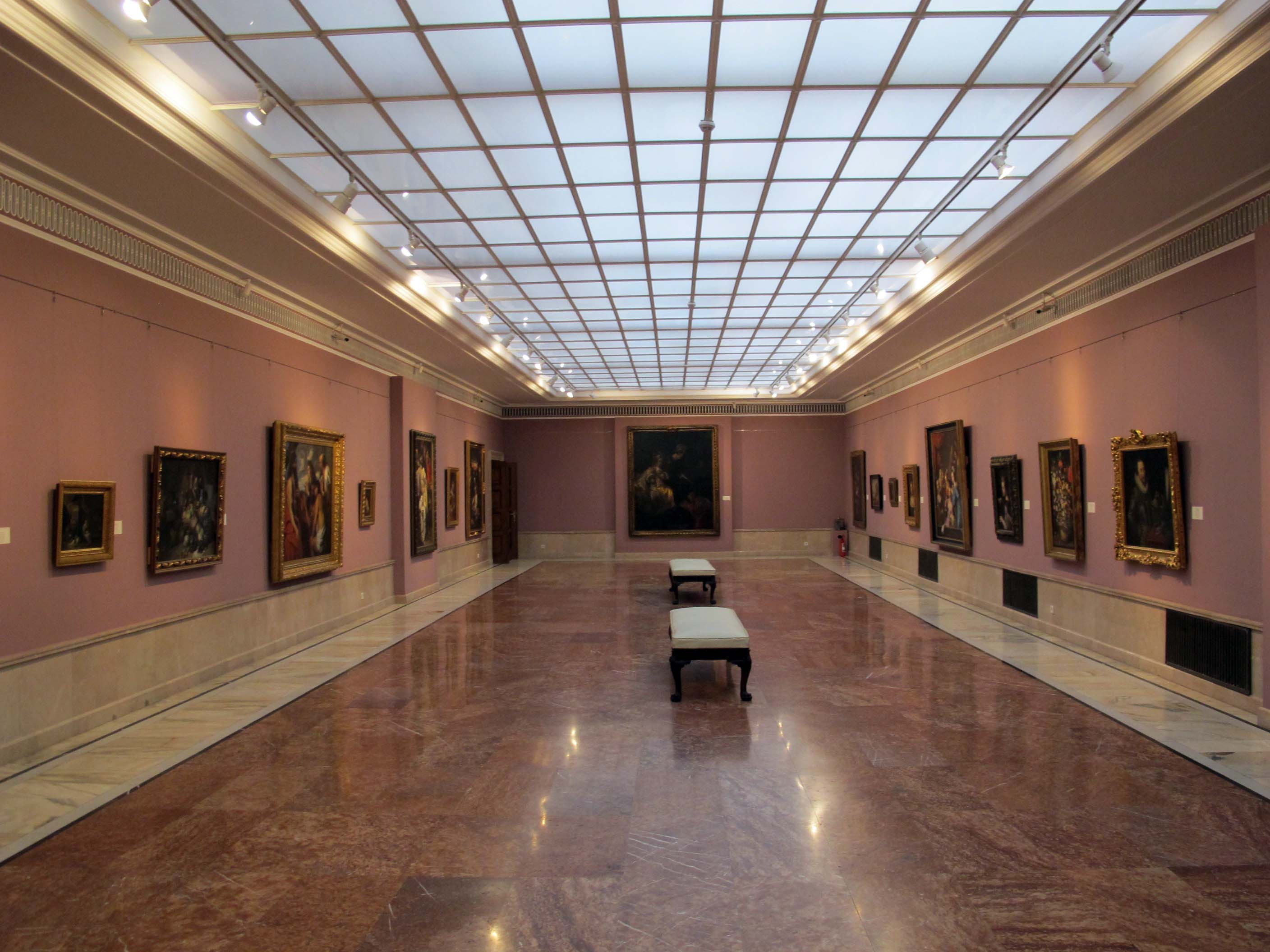
Hall of Flemish and Dutch painters

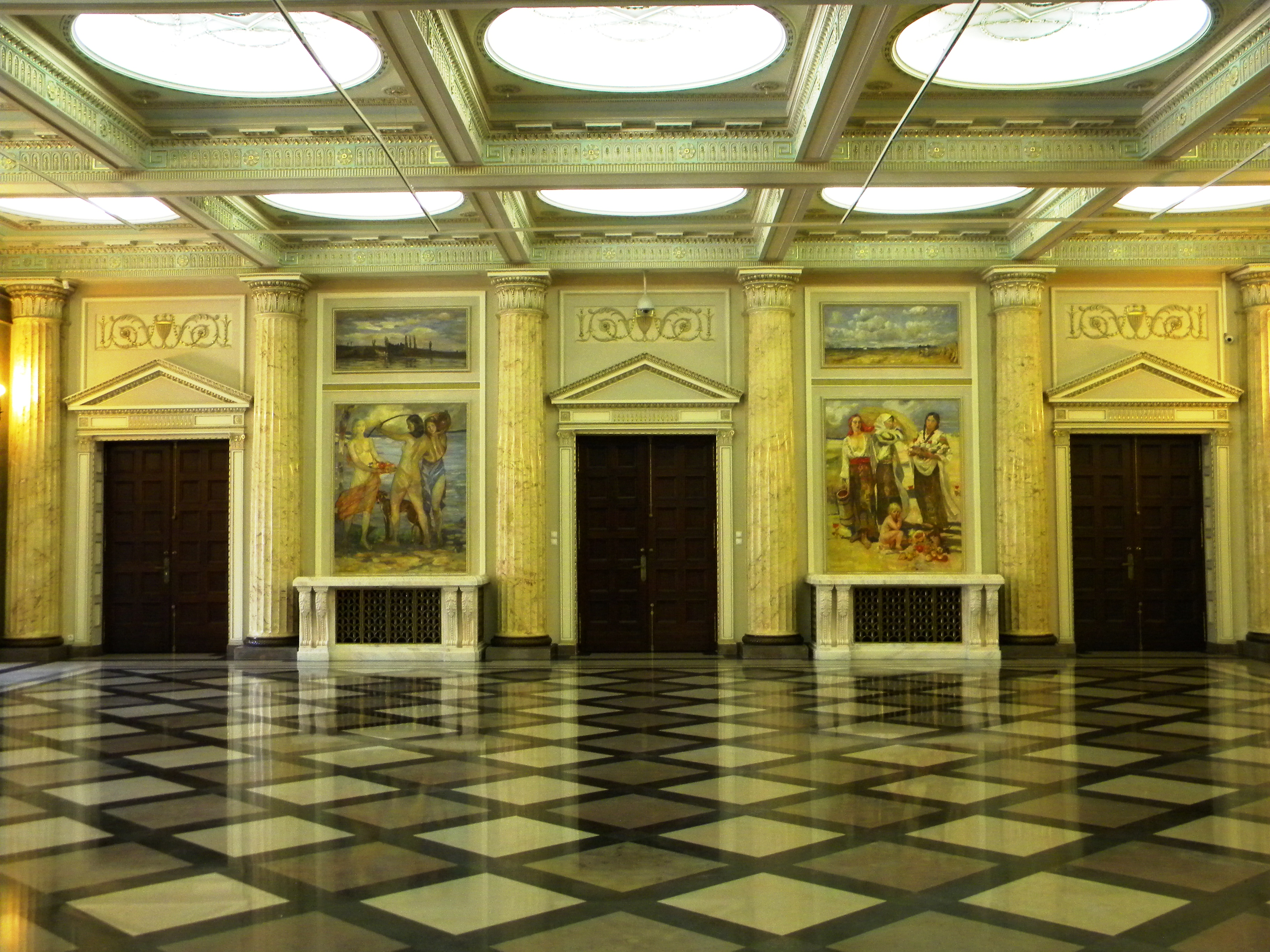
Throne room pavilion

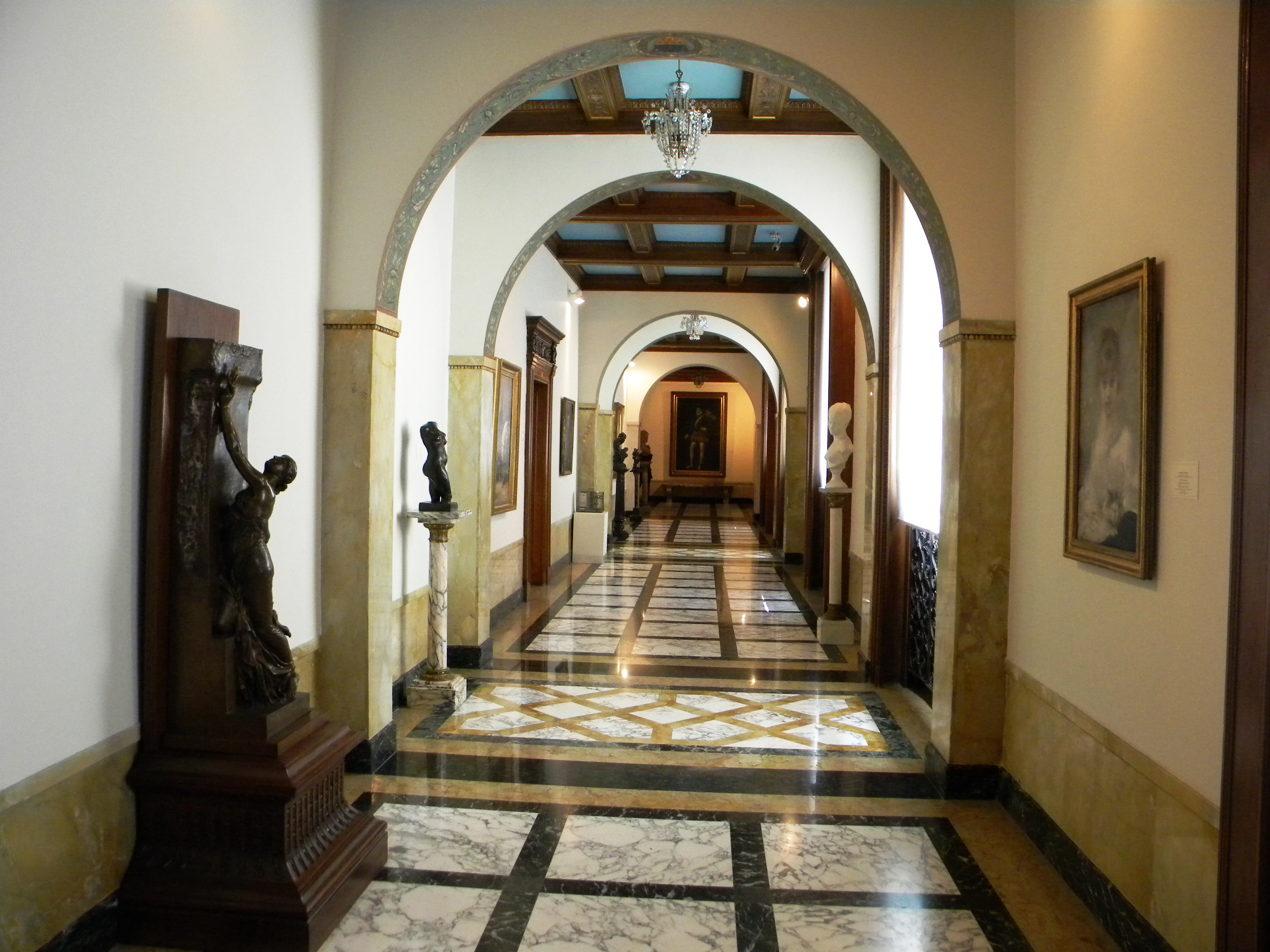
Gallery of European art

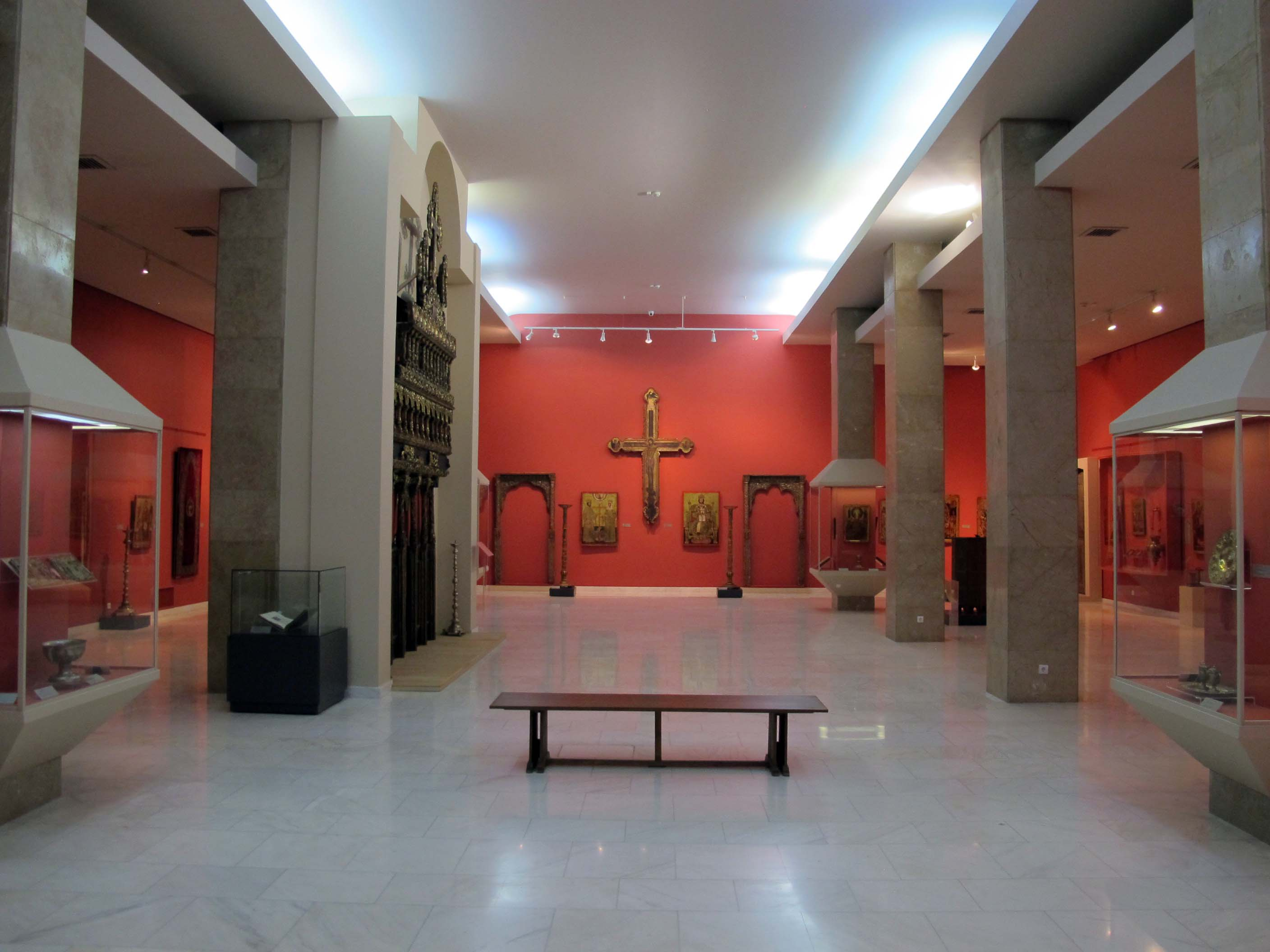
Hall of Romanian art

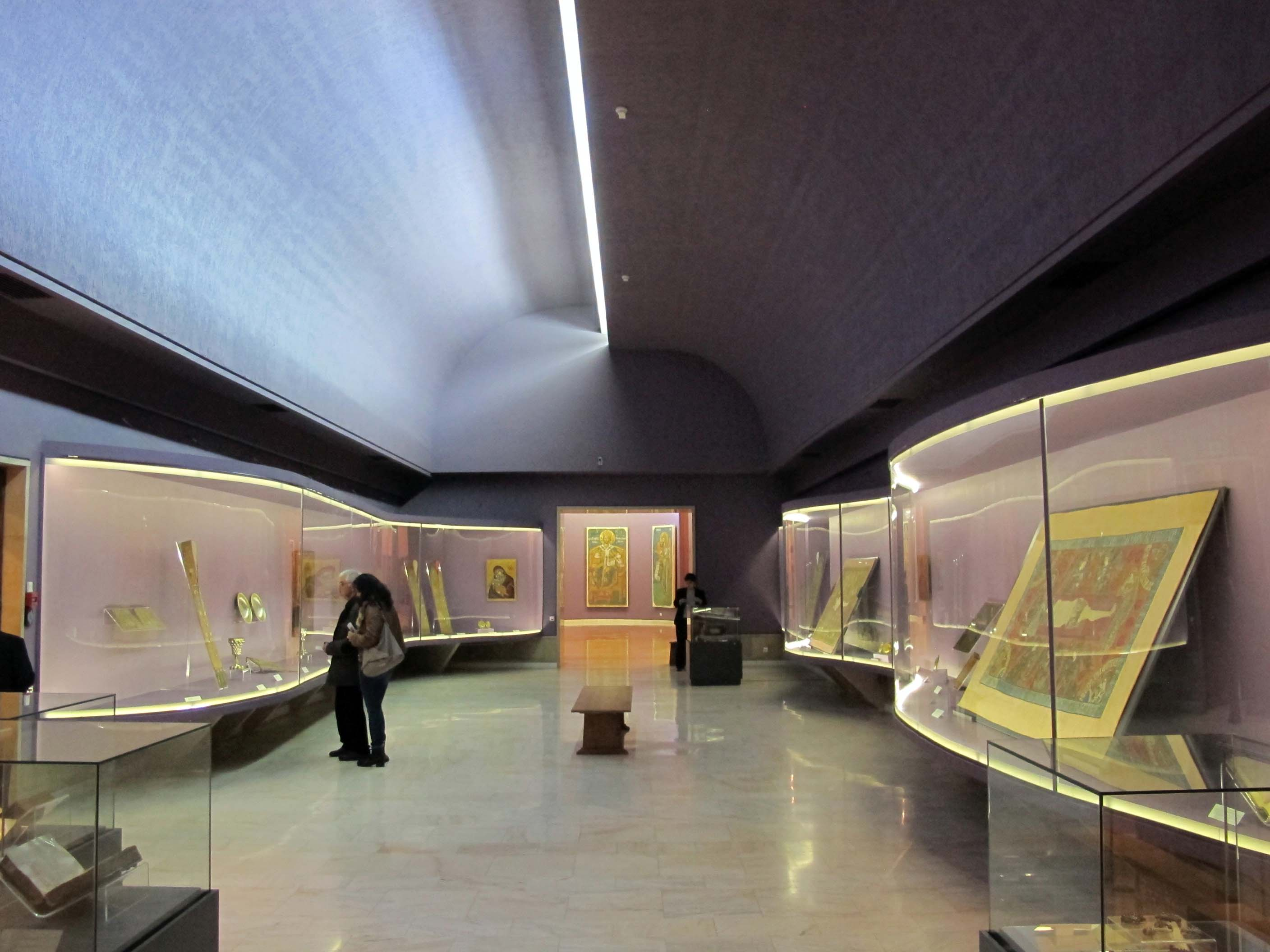
Hall of early Romanian art

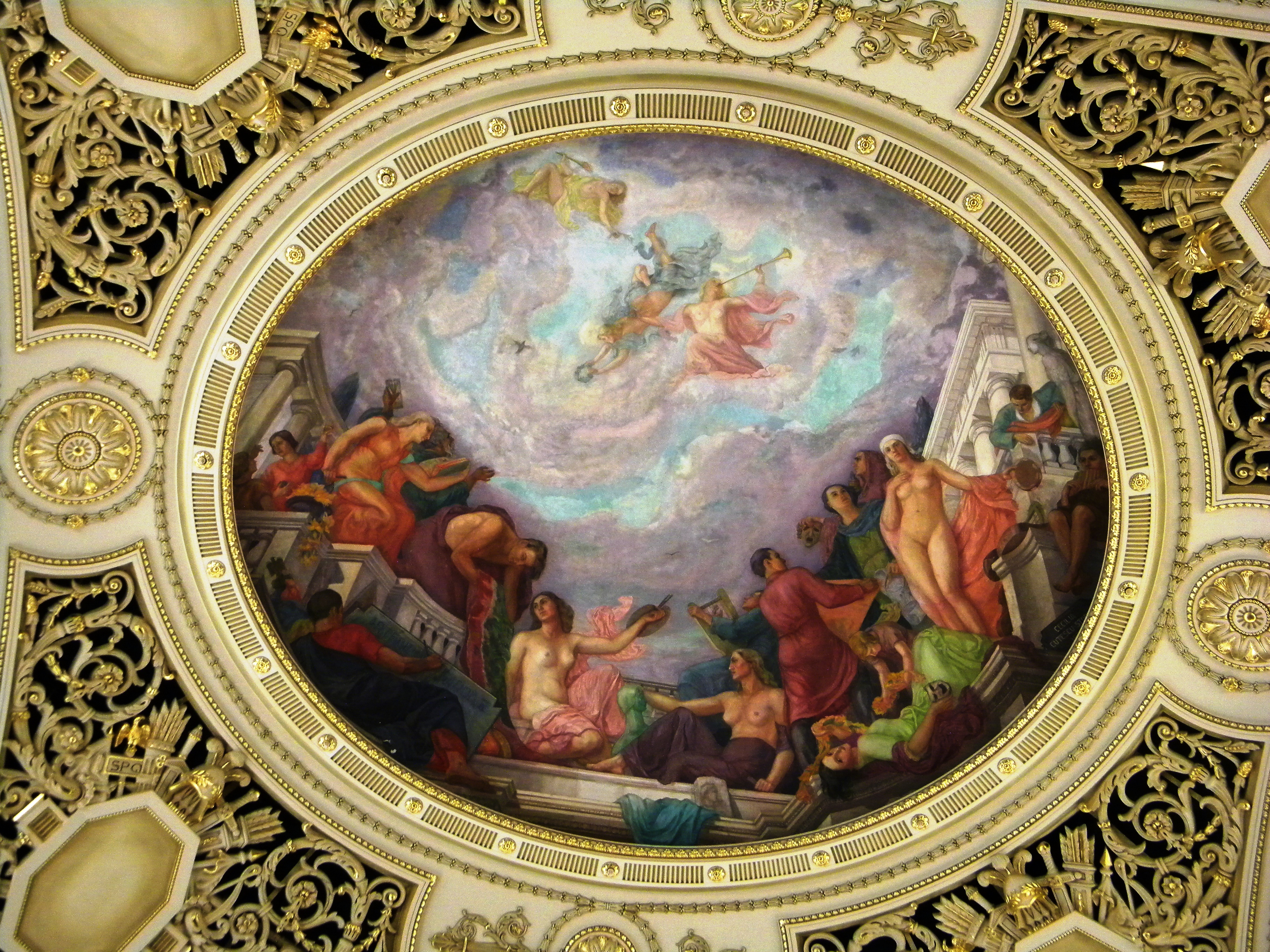
Throne room pavilion ceiling

== See also ==
- National Museum of Romanian History
- List of national galleries
- List of museums in Bucharest
