= Theodor Aman Museum =

Museum in Bucharest, Romania

Coordinates: 44.4402°N 26.0982°E

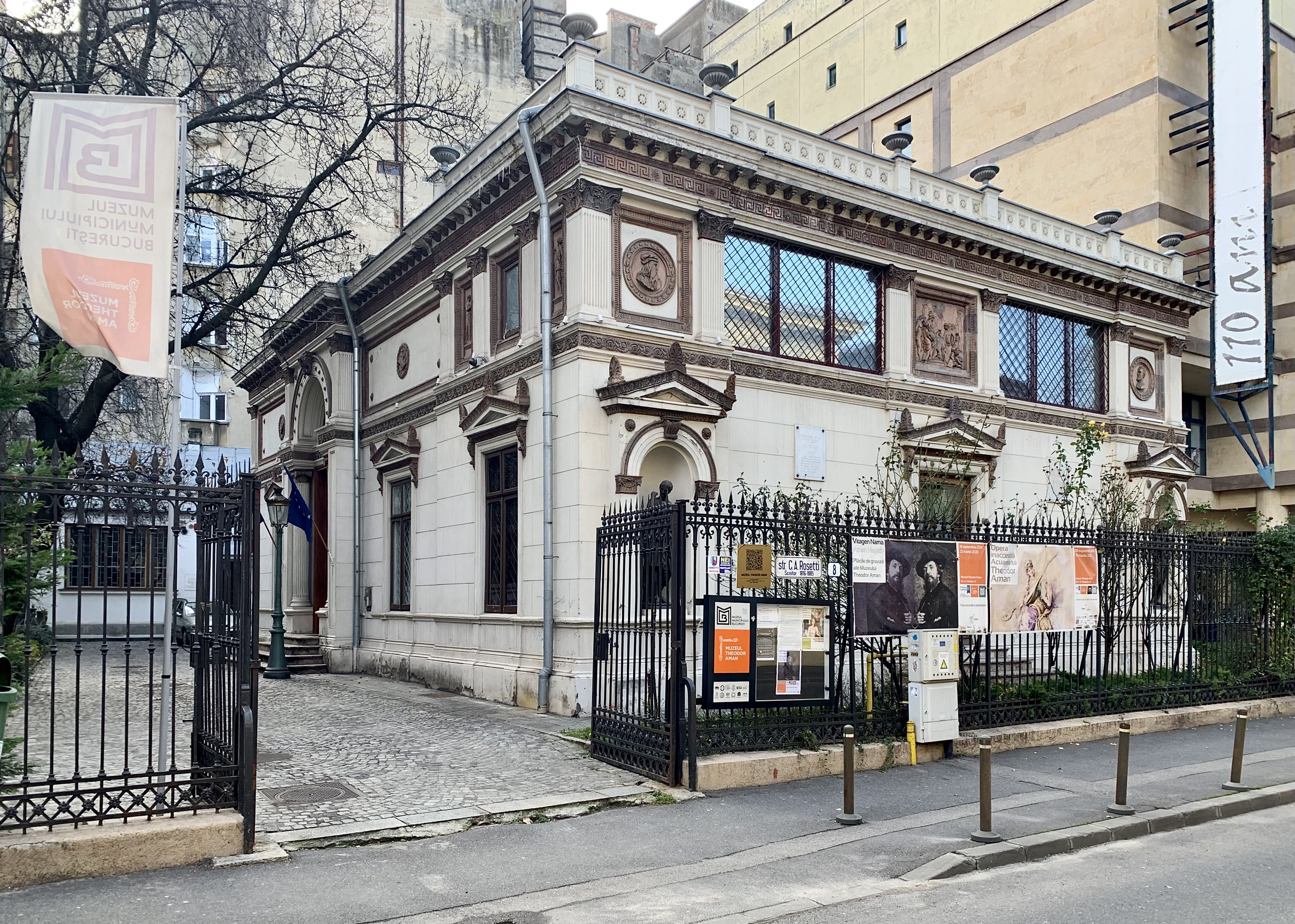
The Theodor Aman Museum

The Theodor Aman Museum is a museum located at 8 C. A. Rosetti Street in Bucharest, Romania. It is dedicated to the life and work of painter, engraver and art professor Theodor Aman.

== Overview ==
The building that currently houses the museum was constructed in 1868, and is located between the Romanian Athenaeum and the Memorial of Rebirth. The building served as Aman's workshop and private residence until his death in 1891. The house was converted into a museum in 1908, and has since then remained stylistically untouched. It is listed as a historic monument by Romania's Ministry of Culture and Religious Affairs.

The entirety of the house was designed by Theodor Aman himself, including the house's architectural plans, its exterior decorations (done in collaboration with sculptor Karl Storck), mural paintings, stained glass, stucco ceilings, wood panelling, and furniture. The bulk of the art contained within the museum is also by Aman, who specialised in small oil paintings depicting aspects of local and national life in Romania.

== See also ==
- List of museums in Bucharest
- List of single-artist museums
