= Theodor Pallady Museum =

Museum in Bucharest, Romania

Coordinates: 44.43911°N 26.1134°E

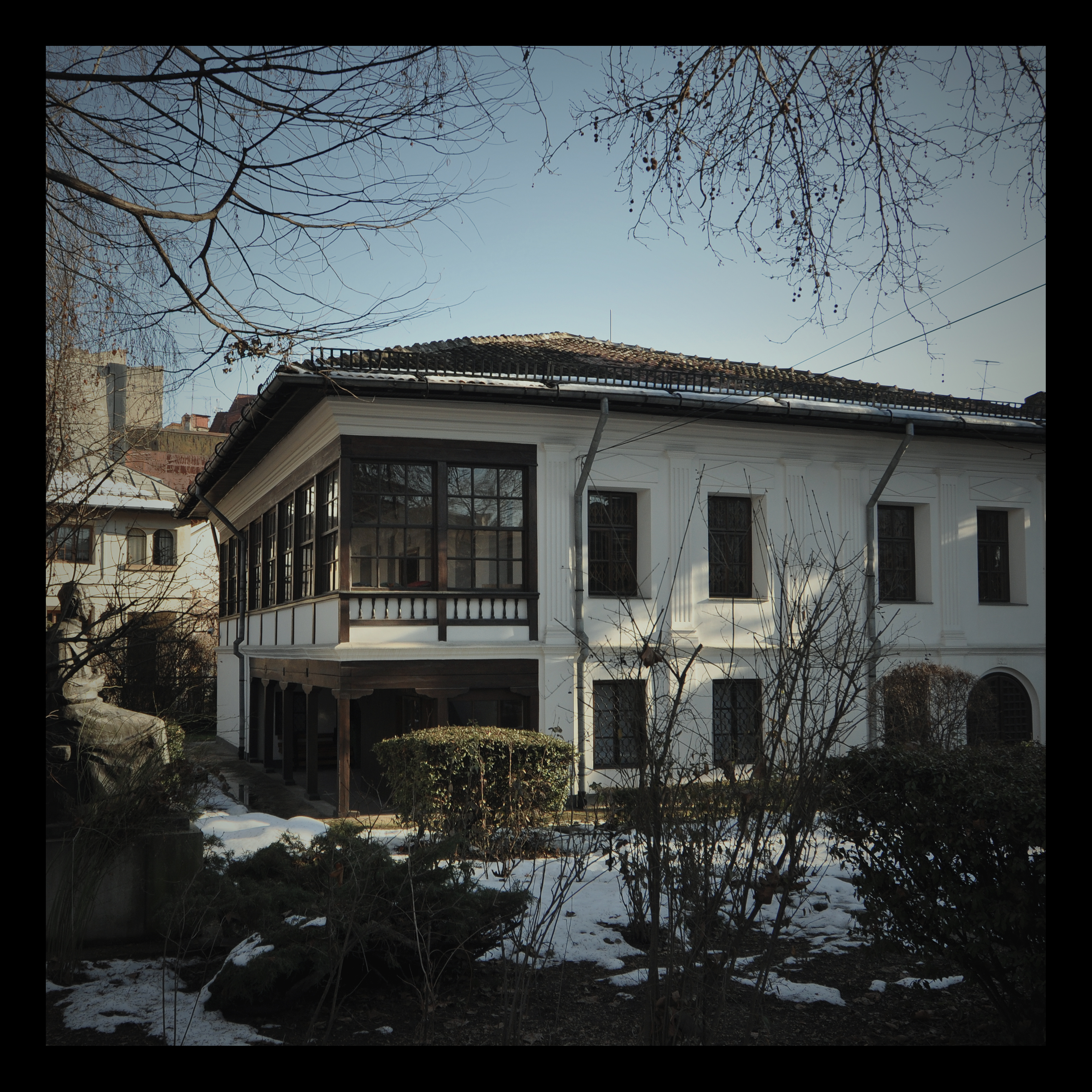
Melik House / Theodor Pallady Museum

The Theodor Pallady Museum is a museum located at 22 Spătarului Street in Bucharest, Romania. Situated in one of the oldest surviving merchant houses in the city, it includes many works by the well-known Romanian painter Theodor Pallady, as well as a number of European and Oriental furniture pieces. Built in the second half of the 18th century, the house is named after its most illustrious owner, Iacob Melic.

The museum has some remarkable paintings by Pallady, as well as a batch of over 800 drawings (landscapes, nudes, portraits, interiors), representative of his Parisian period. They are exhibited periodically in thematic series.

== See also ==
- List of museums in Bucharest
- List of single-artist museums
