= Theodor Pallady =

Romanian painter (1871–1956)

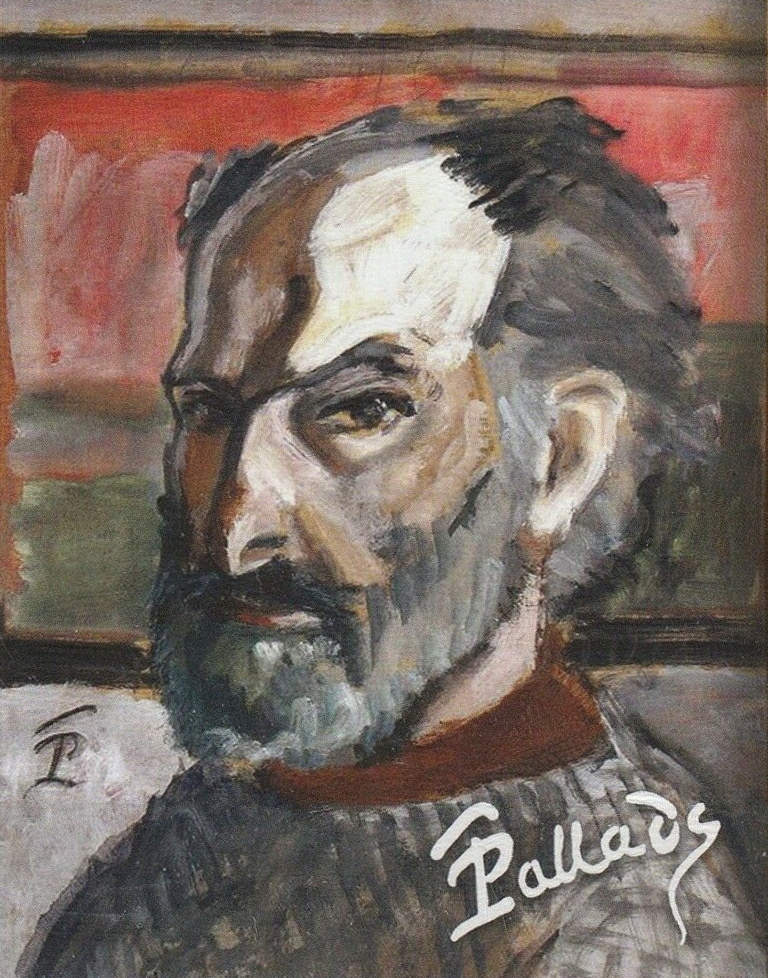
Self-portrait on a 2021 Romanian stamp

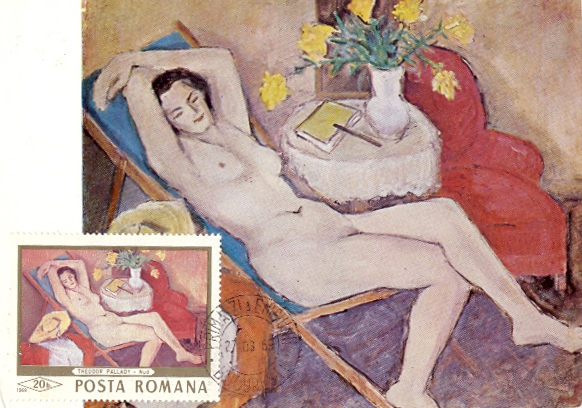
Nude on a 1969 Romanian postcard

Theodor Pallady (Romanian pronunciation: [teˈodor paˈladi]; 11 April 1871 – 16 August 1956) was a Romanian painter.

== Biography ==
Theodor Pallady was the son of Ioan Pallady and Maria Cantacuzino, the older sister of Romanian diplomat Neculai B. Cantacuzino. He was born in Iași, Romania on April, 14th 1878 and spent his childhood both in Perieni and in Iași. At a young age, his family sent him to Dresden, where he studied engineering at the Dresden University of Technology between 1887 and 1889. At the same time, he studied art with Erwin Oehme, who, recognising his artistic intuition, suggested that he go to Paris.

In Paris, Pallady worked in the studio of Edmond Aman-Jean and enrolled in the Academy of Fine Arts (Académie des Beaux-Arts). In 1892 he joined Gustave Moreau’s studio where he worked alongside painters such as Henri Matisse, with whom he developed a close friendship, Georges Rouault, and Albert Marquet.

In 1900, he presented his work "The Prodigal Son", at the Exposition Universelle, which earned him high praise.

In 1906 he married Jeanne Ghika-Brigadier.

He opened a studio in Paris on Place Dauphine, where he worked until 1940, traveling often between France and Romania.

In 1904, Pallady returned to Romania, where he held an exhibition at the Romanian Athenaeum. However, he maintained close connections with Paris, where he continued to hold many personal exhibitions, up until World War II.

Pallady never lost the contact with Romania and had friends from the community of Romanian artists and intellectuals living in Paris, including Benjamin Fondane, George Enescu, Constantin Brâncuși, Camil Ressu, Nicolae Dărăscu, Panait Istrati, Traian Vuia, Eugène Ionesco, Emil Cioran, and Paul Celan. Theodor Pallady bought the first Brâncuși Kiss sculpture, a small version (7.8" × 1.18" × 1.57") in pink marble. This sculpture is dated 1905 and was brought with him to Romania. He also exhibited at the Venice Biennale in 1924, 1940 and 1942.

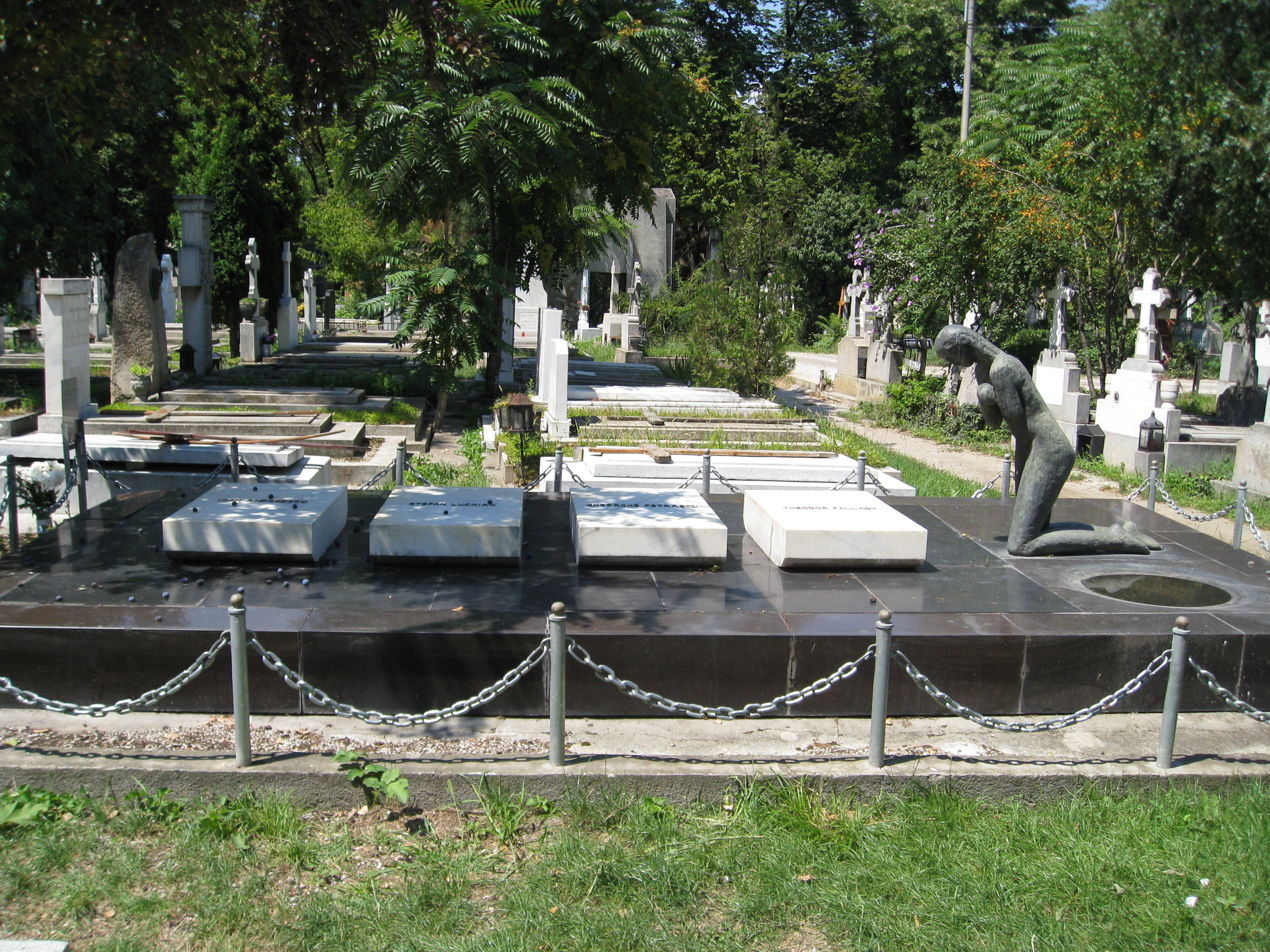
Grave of Theodor Pallady at Bellu Cemetery (right)

In 1940 he moved to Bucharest. He died in Bucharest on 16 August 1956, and is buried in Bellu Cemetery.

== Legacy ==
The Melik House, situated in Bucharest houses The Theodor Pallady Museum, a branch of the National Museum of Art of Romania. Here are exposed his canvas paintings, as well as 800 of landscape sketches, portraits, and still life paintings, which are representative of his Paris period. The building, built in 1750 by Hagi Kevork Nazaretoglu, is the oldest house in Bucharest. In front of the museum's building stands a bronze statue of Theodor Pallady, created by the Romanian sculptor Gheorghe D. Anghel. Other works of Pallady's are features of the National Museum's main collection, at Bucharest's Zambaccian Museum, the Palace of Culture in Iași, the Argeș County Museum in Pitești, the Brukenthal National Museum in Sibiu, and the Craiova Art Museum in Craiova.
