= Theodor Aman =

Romanian painter, engraver and art professor (1831–1891)

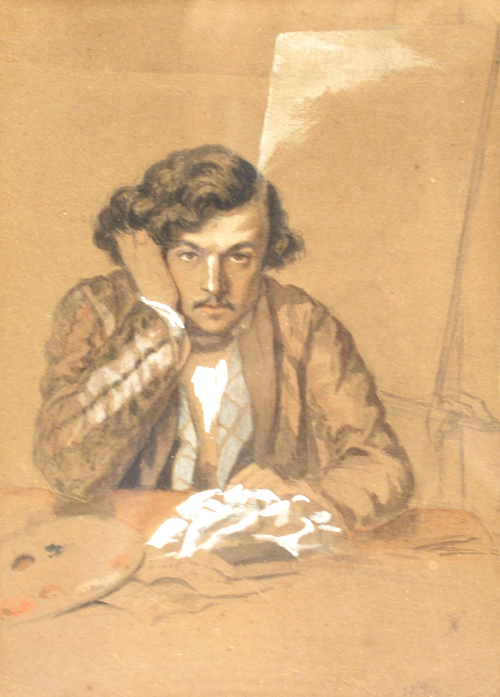
- Self-portrait (1851)
- Born: 20 March 1831; Câmpulung-Muscel, Wallachia (today Romania)
- Died: 19 August 1891 (aged 60); Bucharest, Kingdom of Romania
- Resting place: Bellu Cemetery, Bucharest
- Education: Michel Martin Drolling, Constantin Lecca, François-Édouard Picot, Carol Wallenstein
- Known for: Painting, engraving

Theodor Aman (20 March 1831 – 19 August 1891) was a Romanian painter, engraver and art professor. He mostly produced genre and history scenes.

== Biography ==
His father was a cavalry commander from Craiova but he was born in Câmpulung, where his family had fled to escape the plague. After displaying an early affinity for art, he took his first lessons with Constantin Lecca and Carol Wallenstein de Vella at Carol I National College. In 1850, he went to Paris, where he studied briefly with Michel Martin Drolling then, after Drolling's death, with François-Édouard Picot. While there, he became part of the Romanian revolutionary circles. In 1853 he has his first display at the Salon in Paris, showing his Autoportrait. While in Paris, he became friends with other like-minded artists and Romanian revolutionaries such as Nicolae Bălcescu, and the writers Dimitrie Bolintineanu, and Cezar Bolliac. In this environment, influenced by revolutionary ideas, Aman completed the historical themed painting "Mihai Viteazul's First Night at Alba Iulia", which was inspired by the writings of Bolintineanu.

As a result of his strong patriotic sentiments, he participated in the Romanian Revolution of 1848 along with Ioan Maiorescu, Eugeniu Carada, and other revolutionaries.

After that, he went to Istanbul in an effort to sell some paintings to the Sultan and visited Sevastopol during the Crimean War, creating history paintings with themes related to Romania's nationalist aspirations. In 1855, he presented one of his best-known works, depicting the Battle of Alma, at the Exposition Universelle.

He returned to Romania in 1857, settling in Bucharest where he starts the foundation of his school the Bucharest National University of Arts.

When he returned home, he was knighted by Prince Barbu Dimitrie Știrbei and presented with a scholarship to continue his studies in Paris, where he came under the influence of the Barbizon school. After a brief stay in Rome, he returned to Bucharest.

In 1864, he and Gheorghe Tattarescu convinced Romania's ruler, Alexandru Ioan Cuza, to establish the "National School of Fine Arts" (now known as the Bucharest National University of Arts). Aman was appointed its first director and held that position until his death.

Aman remained headmaster of the school until his death. In 1889 and 1890 he displayed his work in exhibits at the New Museum. At this point in his career he chose to focus on painting still life, and small portraits.

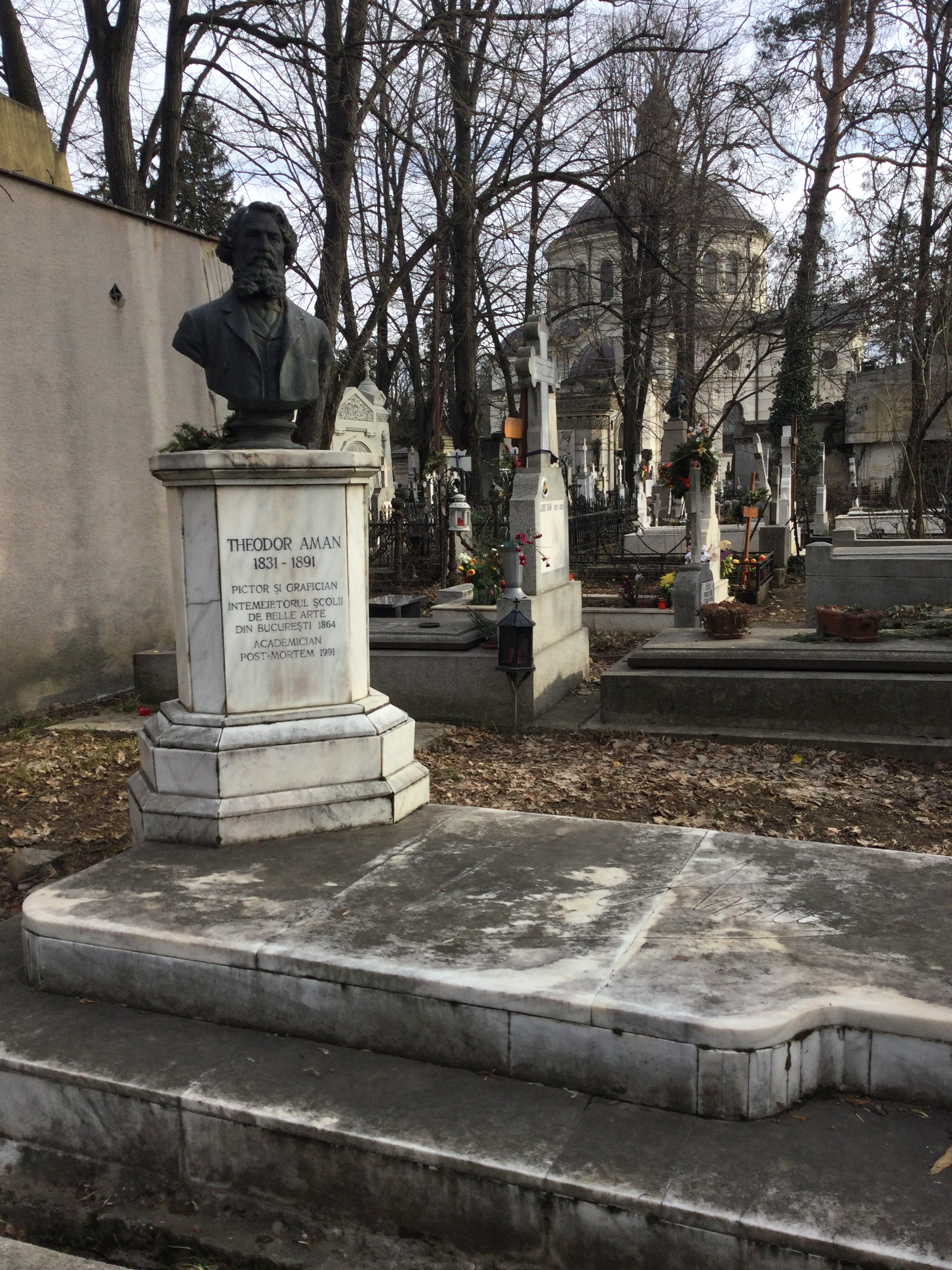
Grave at Bellu Cemetery

He died on 19 August 1891 due to a prostate infection.

== Legacy ==
In 1908 his home and workshop in Bucharest was converted into the Theodor Aman Museum in dedication to his life and works. The museum is one of the oldest memorial museums in Romania and houses a large number of Aman paintings. The exhibit "Theodor Aman — painter and engraver" was inaugurated on March 24, 2011, at the Cotroceni National Museum. The exhibit "The mysteries of Theodor Aman's painting," was inaugurated at the Theodor Aman Museum on December 23, 2014.

In 2014, to celebrate the 150th anniversary of the school's founding, Poșta Română issued a commemorative stamp with Aman's likeness.

== Selected paintings ==
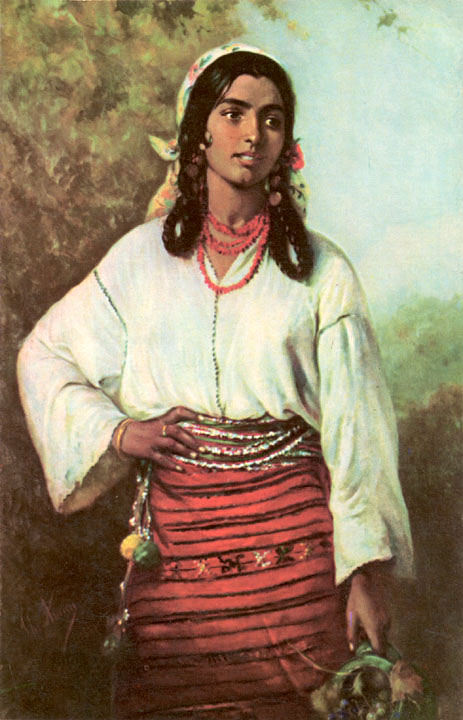
Gypsy Girl

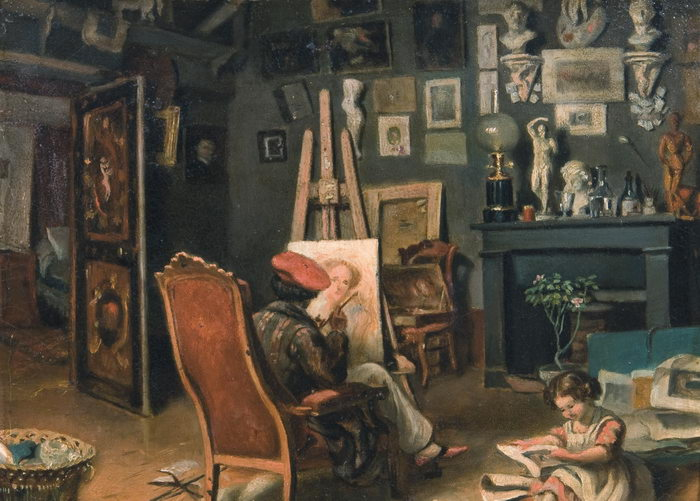
First Workshop in Paris

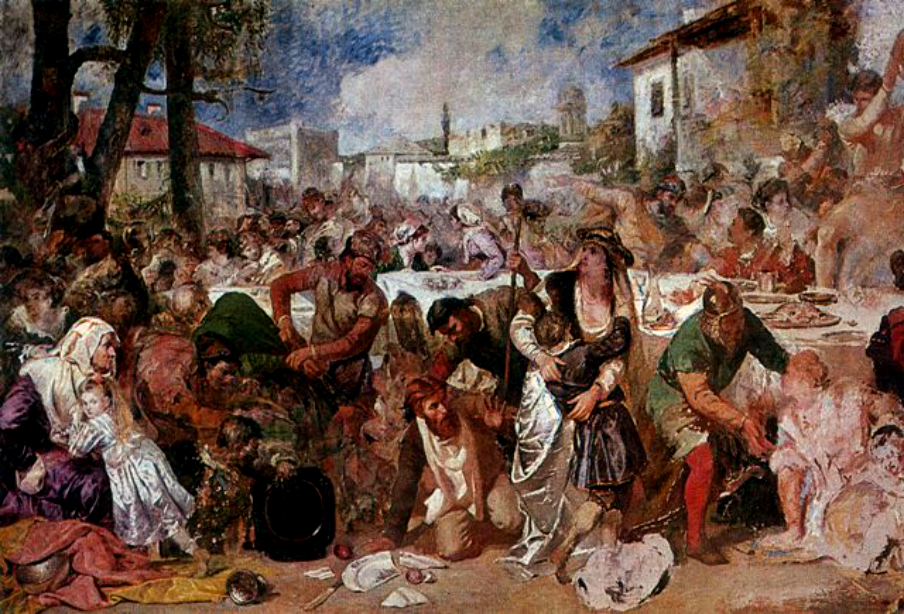
Boyars surprised at the feast by Vlad the Impaler's envoys; painting by Theodor Aman

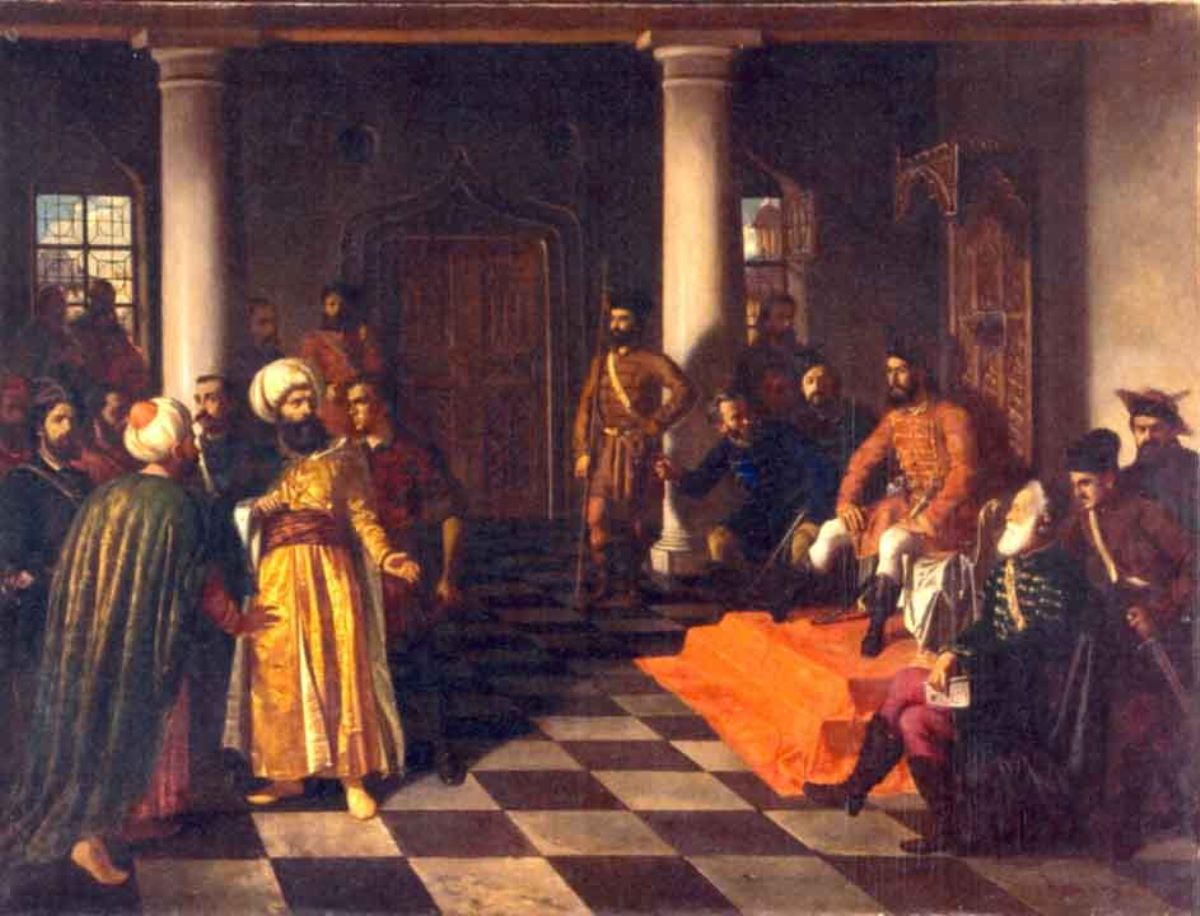
Vlad the Impaler and the Turkish Envoys

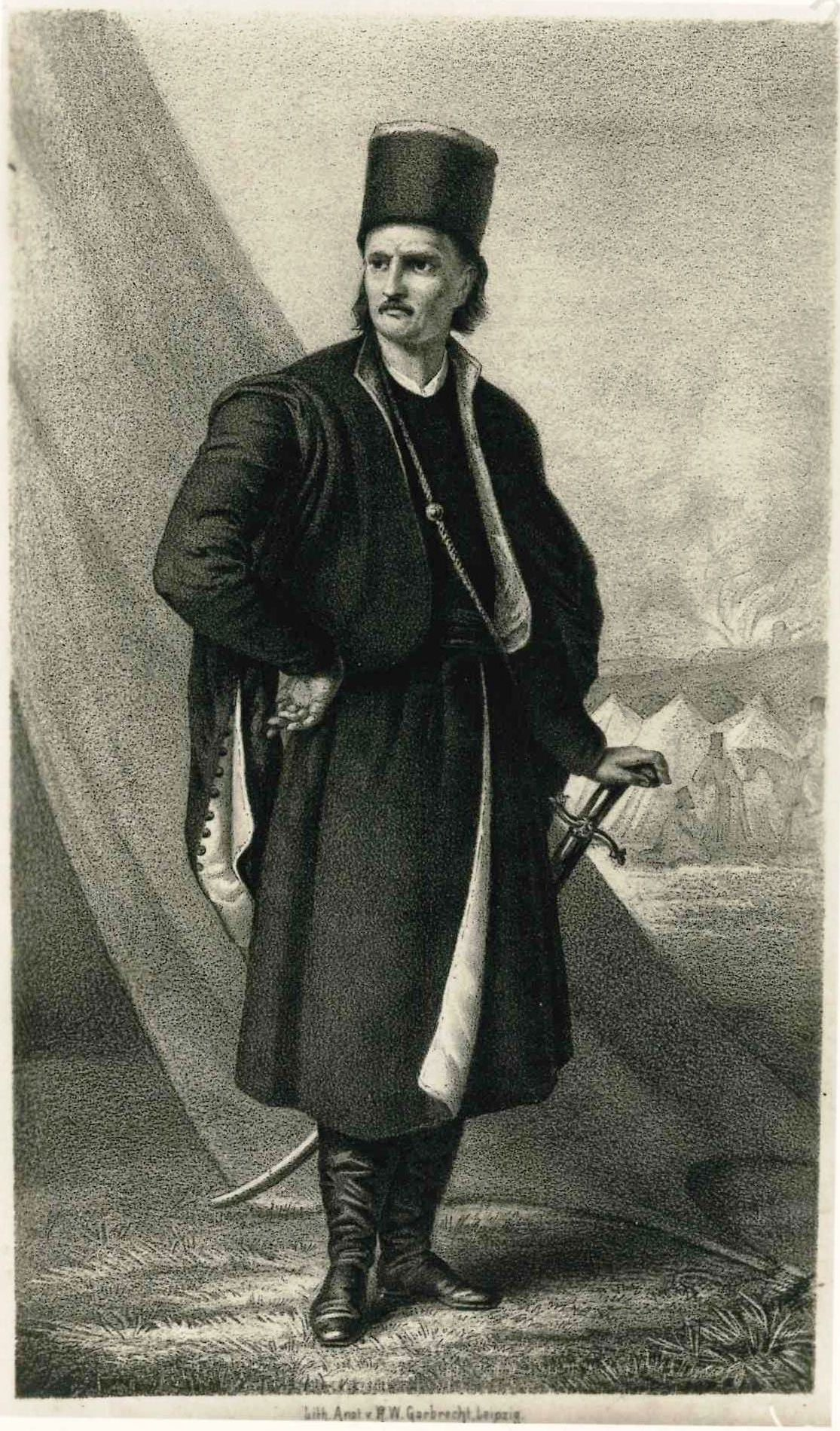
Portrait of Tudor Vladimirescu

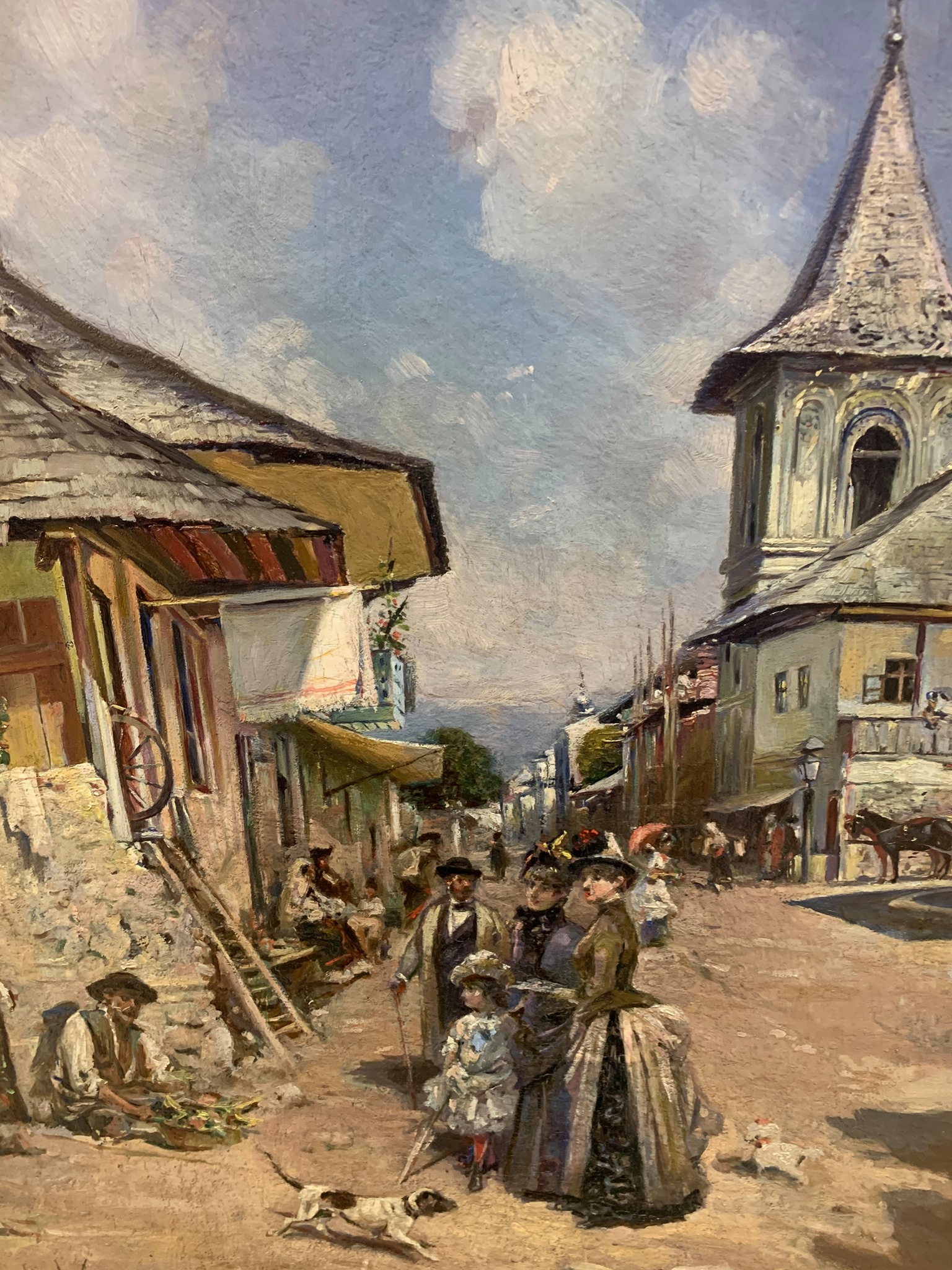
Street in Câmpulung
