= National Museum of Contemporary Art (Romania) =

Museum in Bucharest, Romania

- Muzeul Național de Artă Contemporană
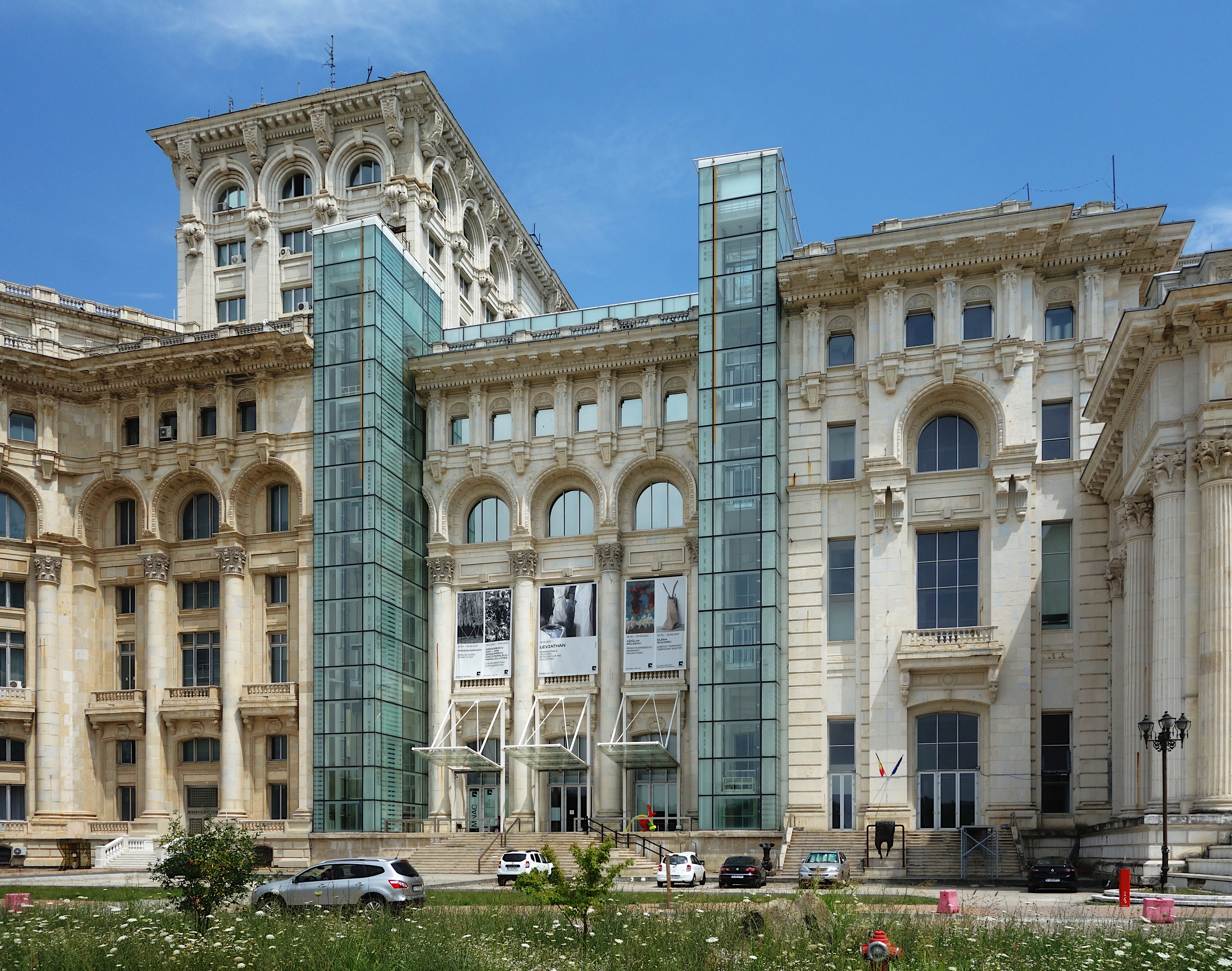
- Location: Bucharest, Romania
- Coordinates: 44°25′40.94″N 26°5′13.23″E
- Type: art museum
- Website: www.mnac.ro/home

The National Museum of Contemporary Art (Romanian: Muzeul Național de Artă Contemporană, or MNAC) is a contemporary art museum in Bucharest, Romania. The museum is located in a new glass wing of the Palace of the Parliament, one of the largest administrative buildings in the world.

== See also ==
- List of national galleries
