= Carol Wallenstein de Vella =

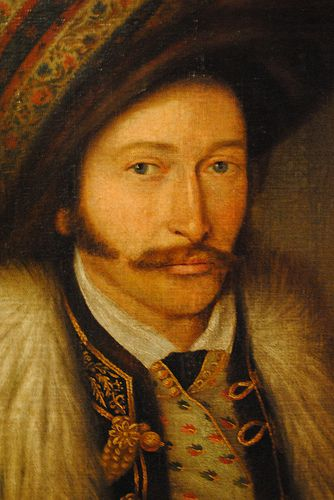
Self-portrait (detail, date unknown)

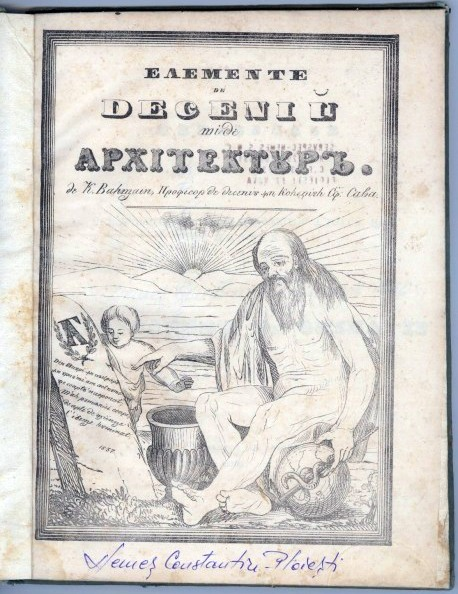
Title page from his Elements of Design and Architecture

Carol Wallenstein de Vella, also known as Karol Wallenstein or Carol Valștain (1795 – 26 December 1858) was a Croatian-born Romanian painter, art professor, and museographer, who served as the first drawing teacher at the Princely Academy of Saint Sava. Some sources give his year of death as 1863.

== Biography ==
Carol was born in Gospić in the Habsburg Kingdom of Croatia. His father's name was Ioan Vella. Orphaned at an early age, he was adopted by the Wallenstein family. He followed a traditional course of studies at the Academy of Fine Arts, Vienna. Upon graduating, he went to Brașov for his apprenticeship. In 1817, he settled in Craiova, with his aunt's family. In 1821, after establishing his reputation as an artist and teacher, he married a Romanian woman from Slatina.

The year 1829 found him in the service of the public schools. As a result, the following year, he was appointed a professor at the new Princely Academy of Saint Sava in Bucharest. In 1836, he published a book on the elements of drawing and created a series of lithographs, depicting scenes from Romanian history. This led to his appointment as the first Director of the National Museum of Natural History, established three years earlier by Alexandru Dimitrie Ghica, the Prince of Wallachia.

He used his experience at Saint Sava to acquire and organize the first collection of sculpture casts, based on the works of the old Italian Masters. He also collected contemporary paintings and fictional or posthumous portraits of the old Romanian rulers. His own self-portrait is done in that style. He was also involved in numismatics and the natural sciences; especially ornithology, in which he had a strong personal interest.

In 1850, by the decree of Prince Barbu Știrbei, a separate painting gallery was established at the museum, under Wallenstein's management. Stirbei donated two paintings from his own collection to start the gallery; one by Gheorghe Tattarescu, who was studying in Rome, and one by Petre Alexandrescu. In 1851, Stirbei approved the purchase of five works by Constantin Lecca.

Not long before his death he founded a printing house, together with his friend, Carol Szathmari. He died in Bucharest. His son, Iosif (1831-1900), became a drawing teacher in Ploiești.
