= Ivan Burenin =

Ivan Nikolaevich Burenin
- Born: August 8, 1896
- Died: June 21, 1986 (aged 89)
- Military career
- Allegiance: Soviet Union
- Branch: Red Army
- Rank: Major General
- Commands: Bucharest garrison

Ivan Nikolaevich Burenin (Russian: Иван Николаевич Буренин; August 8, 1896 – June 21, 1986) was a major general of the Red Army during World War II. From August to December 1, 1944, he was the Soviet commander of the Bucharest garrison. On 28 August 1944, deposed Romanian dictator Ion Antonescu was delivered to him by Emil Bodnăraș after being arrested during King Michael's Coup.

== The arrest of Ion Antonescu ==
According to former King Michael I of Romania and his secretary Mircea Ionnițiu, the day the Red Army entered Bucharest (28 August 1944), Emil Bodnăraș personally delivered the deposed dictator Ion Antonescu to General Burenin. The former head of the government had been arrested at the Royal Palace during the events of 23 August 1944, on King's orders and then detained in the Fichet room in Casa Nouă until after two o'clock in the morning. For security reasons (German retaliation was soon expected), between two and three o'clock, on the request of his collaborators and the new Sănătescu government, the King left the Palace for Dobrița, a small village in Gorj County. After his departure, around four o'clock, the military Palace Guard transferred Antonescu and his fellow detainees under the supervision of the civil squadron organised by the main political parties, as it was discussed previously (the Police and the Gendarmerie were not to be trusted yet, because their commanders were close Antonescu collaborators). In fact, this squadron was exclusively formed by men of the Romanian Communist Party, because the other parties (PNL, PNȚ) were unable to provide the necessary men in time for the coup. Under the supervision of Bodnăraș (which had deserted the Romanian Army in the 1930s), the Communists immediately moved the detainees to a safe house in the Vatra Luminoasă neighborhood, where Bodnăraș' girlfriend lived. From here the detainees were delivered to the Soviet military, who flew them to the USSR. Their repatriation took place in 1946, when the group was put under trial] by the Romanian People's Tribunals. Some of them, including Antonescu, were condemned to the death penalty and subsequently shot.

== Bibliography ==
- Mircea Ionnițiu - Amintiri și reflecțiuni (Memories and Reflections), Editura Enciclopedică, 1993, ISBN 973-45-0039-2, page 42–72
- Mircea Ciobanu - Convorbiri cu Mihai I al României (Talks with Mihai I of Romania), Editura Humanitas, 2008, ISBN 978-973-50-2122-1, page 31

== See also ==
- Pyotr Leshchenko
