= Casa Nouă =

- Interactive map of the Casa Nouă area

General information
- Status: Destroyed
- Type: house
- Location: 24 Pictor Grigorescu Street, Bucharest, Sector 1, Bucharest, Romania
- Coordinates: 44.439144°N 26.094978°E
- Closed: August 24, 1944
- Demolished: August 24, 1944

Technical details
- Floor count: 2

Design and construction
- Known for: King Michael's Coup

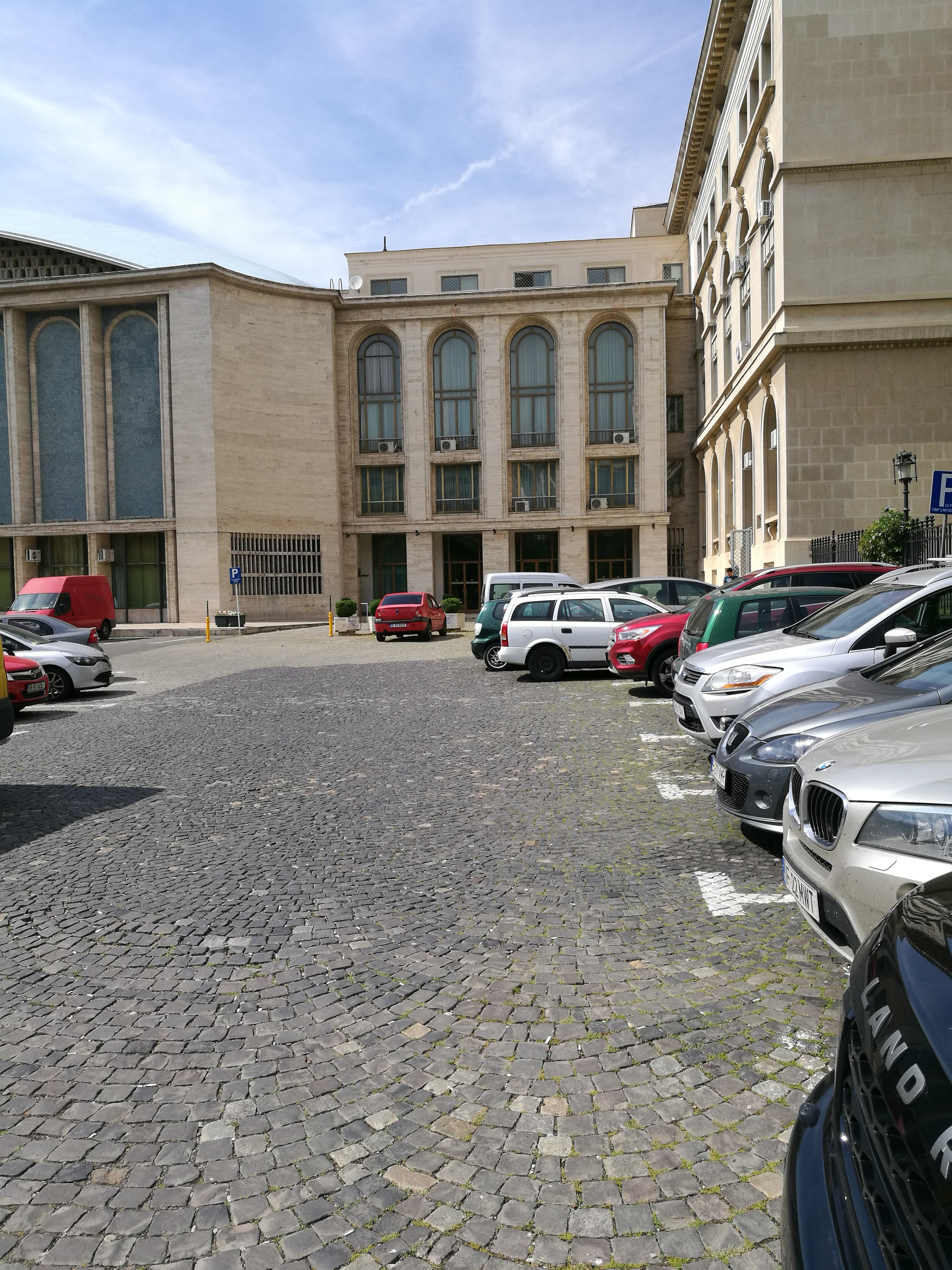
The alley that once separated Royal residence Casa Nouă (where Sala Palatului now stands, at left) by the backside of the Royal Palace (at right).

Casa Nouă (Romanian for The New House) was a villa in Bucharest, Romania, used as a Royal residence. It was situated at 24, Pictor Grigorescu Street, behind the Royal Palace, on the site where Sala Palatului Concert Hall now stands.

During the reign of King Carol II of Romania, in 1930–1940, the villa hosted the Romanian Royal Family, namely the King and his son, Crown Prince Mihai, Grand Voivode of Alba Iulia (later HM King Michael I of Romania). The villa was the actual place where the Royal Family lived in Bucharest, since the Royal Palace itself mainly contains large, monumental halls, destined for official Royal duties. An alley separated the Palace from Casa Nouă, requiring visitors to traverse it (outdoor) when walking from a building to the other.

After King Carol's abdication and flee on September 5, 1940, Queen Mother Elena of Romania was quickly invited by the new Prime Minister (and future dictator), general Ion Antonescu, to return in the country (from Italy). Antonescu publicly expressed his thought that the new sovereign, young Mihai (then 19 yo), needed his mother's presence, as moral support for his new duties; the move was, indeed, highly appreciated by the King. After the Queen's arrival, the Royal Family sought to live elsewhere (as Casa Nouă was unpleasantly connected to Carol II and his mistress Elena Lupescu). This, however, proved impossible, since the other Royal residence in Bucharest, Cotroceni Palace, was badly damaged by an earthquake on November 10, 1940. Thus, Casa Nouă remained the main Royal residence in Bucharest until August 24, 1944.

In 1940–1944 timeframe, Antonescu increasingly acted as a dictator, allowing the King to perform ceremonial roles only. Consequently, the Royal Family mainly lived at their private residence, Peleș Castle in Sinaia. They visited Bucharest (and thus lived in Casa Nouă) only when summoned by Antonescu.

Casa Nouă was the actual scene of the King Michael's Coup in the afternoon of August 23, 1944. As described by many authors, it is in this house – in King's office, situated at the left of the main entrance – where the final discussion with Antonescu took place, followed by his refusal to switch sides and join the Allies and, subsequently, by his arrest. For a few hours, Antonescu and some fellow members of his Cabinet were imprisoned in a large Fichet room on Casa Nouă's first floor.

Casa Nouă was completely destroyed the following day, during the (targeted) retaliation bombardment performed by the German Luftwaffe, that seriously affected the Royal Palace as well.

After August 24, 1944, with the Royal Palace made uninhabitable by the German bombardment and Cotroceni Palace still not recovered, the Romanian Royal Family missed again a functional Bucharest residence. HM King Michael asked his aunt, Princess Elisabeta of Romania, former Queen Consort of Greece, to allow the court to use her villa in Herăstrău Park. Nowadays, this villa is called Elisabeta Palace, despite the fact it was never intended for official activities. Thus, Elisabeta Palace saw the dramatic events after 1944, that culminated in the King's abdication in 1947, as well as the Family's definitive return in Romania in 1997.

With both the Royal Palace and Cotroceni hosting museums, Elisabeta Palace is still used today as the only Royal residence in Bucharest. Here, the Romanian Royal Family lives and perform public duties.

== Bibliography ==
- Ivor Porter – Michael of Romania. The King and the Country, Phoenix Mill: Sutton Publishing, 2005
- Mircea Ionnițiu – Amintiri și reflecțiuni (Recollections and Thoughts), Editura Enciclopedică, 1993, ISBN 973-45-0039-2
- Mircea Ciobanu – Convorbiri cu Mihai I al României (Interviews with King Michael I of Romania), Editura Humanitas, 2008, ISBN 978-973-50-2122-1
