= Alexandru C. Constantinescu =

Romanian politician

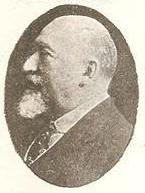
Alexandru C. Constantinescu in 1914

Alexandru C. "Alecu" Constantinescu (4 September 1859 – 18 November 1926) was a Romanian politician.

== Biography ==
=== Background and early political activity ===
Born in Bucharest to a family of Wallachian lesser boyars, his father Costache (b. 1811) owned property in Poienarii-Dănești village, Dâmbovița County (now in Giurgiu County). His mother was one Ecaterina, and he had a number of siblings. He began school in his native city before leaving for Paris, where he graduated with a law degree in 1879 and a doctorate in 1881. After returning to Romania, he first worked as a lawyer in private practice before serving as attorney for the state and for an agricultural bank from 1884 to 1889. Joining the National Liberal Party in 1882, he was elected deputy Mayor of Bucharest that year, remaining until 1884. In 1895, he was elected to the Senate for Putna County. He joined the Chamber of Deputies in 1901.

He was Agriculture and Domains Minister from November 1909 to December 1910, and from January 1914 to December 1916. During the latter period, Constantinescu faced a problem posed by the outbreak of World War I and the position of neutrality adopted by Romania for the time being. The government refused to sell excess grain, as this could only be purchased by the Central Powers, which would have weakened the economic blockade imposed by the Entente Powers. Meanwhile, the grain was rotting, which led the large landowners to exert increasing pressure on the government. Prime Minister Ion I. C. Brătianu received permission from the Entente leadership to sell part of the grain, and decided to sell from state to state rather than to the German–Austro-Hungarian cartel. Thus, in January 1916, the British government signed a contract for 80,000 wagons full of grain. The Romanian government built warehouses near railway stations; these were needed to store the grain prior to transport, since it could not be picked up directly from the country.

=== Wartime Interior Minister ===
He was Interior Minister from December 1916 to January 1918, also under Brătianu. His term coincided with a critical period: Romania had joined the war in August; a German offensive from mid-November to early December had forced King Ferdinand and the government to flee to the temporary capital of Iași, in the Moldavia region. The loss of two-thirds of the national territory posed acute problems, including for Constantinescu's ministry. He ordered numerous law enforcement agencies to retreat to Moldavia, although the Romanian Police and part of the Gendarmerie stayed in place. Subsequently, he reorganized the law enforcement and intelligence command structure, while strengthening police presence in Moldavian cities and towns. He made efforts to strengthen intelligence-gathering through special security brigades in Roman, Tecuci, Piatra Neamț and Vaslui, among other cities. The gendarmes guarded sites of economic and military importance, lines of communication and the military engineers' work along the front. A new agency was formed to guard dignitaries and counter espionage against the Romanian Army, while a group of 160 gendarmes was put together to guard military sites in the Danube Delta. Each infantry division was assigned a police company for counterespionage purposes.

One of the ministry's challenges during 1917 was to identify new spies of the Central Powers in the occupied territory. At the beginning of the year, Romanian and Russian agents worked together, quickly identifying over 2500 suspected spies. Following the retreat to Moldavia, some of the most competent policemen were, following brief training, sent behind the front in order to organize a resistance movement and networks to keep the military command informed of developments. During the Romanian counteroffensive of the summer of 1917, thousands of policemen and gendarmes participated, serving as military police and ensuring security at the front. Meanwhile, the police, together with the army, guarded prisoner-of-war camps.

=== Subsequent career ===
Later on, Constantinescu held the Industry and Commerce (November 1918-September 1919) and the Public Works (February–September 1919) portfolios. His final ministerial stint came from April 1922 to March 1926, when he returned to the Agriculture post. He died that November in Bucharest, and was buried in the city's Bellu cemetery. He married a German woman, but when he had a son by her sister, the couple divorced by mutual understanding, the procedure taking an unusually short twelve days. He then married his sister-in-law, legitimizing his only and well-beloved son. This son, Constantin Al. "Atta" Constantinescu, grew up to become a diplomat and cabinet minister.

== Various ==
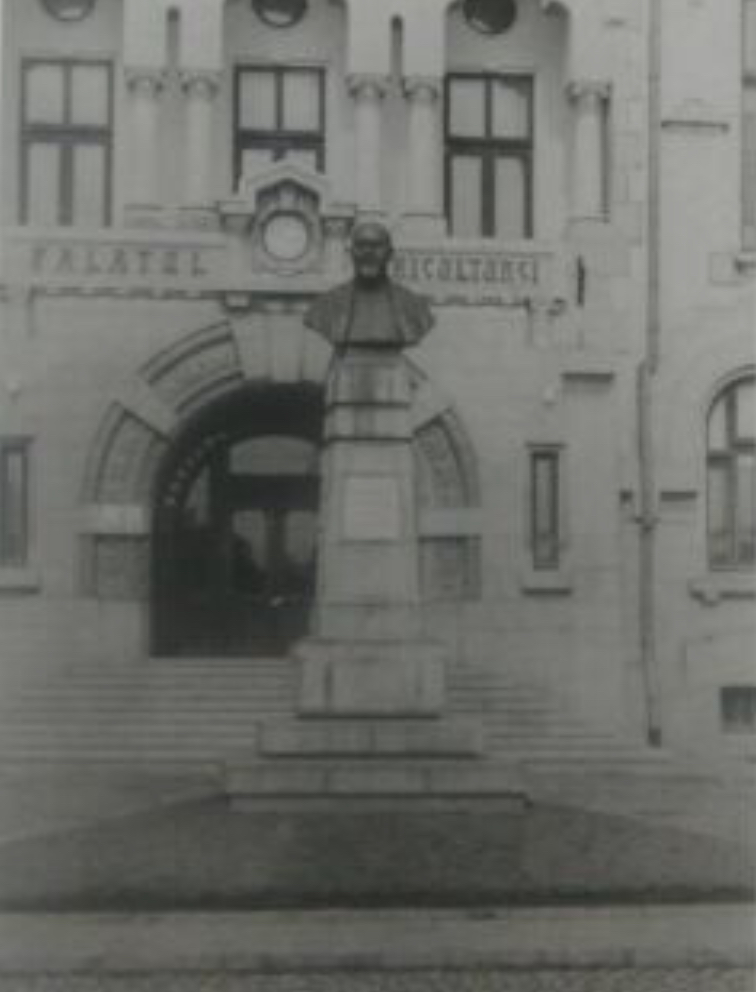
Statue of Constantinescu in Brăila, later torn down

Constantinescu was nicknamed Porcu ("the pig"). Ion G. Duca notes in his memoirs that this originated during his school days and was due to his "short, thick, rotund physique, rosy skin and reddish hair", but later also applied to his reputed moral character. Whether fairly or not, all the negative aspects that the name implied were ascribed to him, although Duca says he never noticed dubious conduct about the man while they served in cabinet. This perception was confirmed by their fellow Liberal minister (and scrupulous moralist) Vintilă Brătianu, who kept him under close observation.

In 1935, a bronze statue of Constantinescu was unveiled before the Palace of Agriculture in Brăila. The work of Oscar Späthe, it honored his contribution to the building. The monument was demolished by the communist regime and replaced by parking spaces. A street in Bucharest, called “Câmpina” under communism, bears his name.
