= Burenin =

Burenin (Russian: Буре́нин), female form Burenina (Russian: Буре́нина), is a Russian surname. Notable people with this surname include:

- Ivan Burenin (1896–1986), Soviet general
- Nikolay Burenin (1874–1962), Russian revolutionary
- Viktor Burenin (1841–1926), Russian literary and theatre critic
