= Ceaușescu's speech of 21 August 1968 =

Speech by Romanian leader Nicolae Ceaușescu

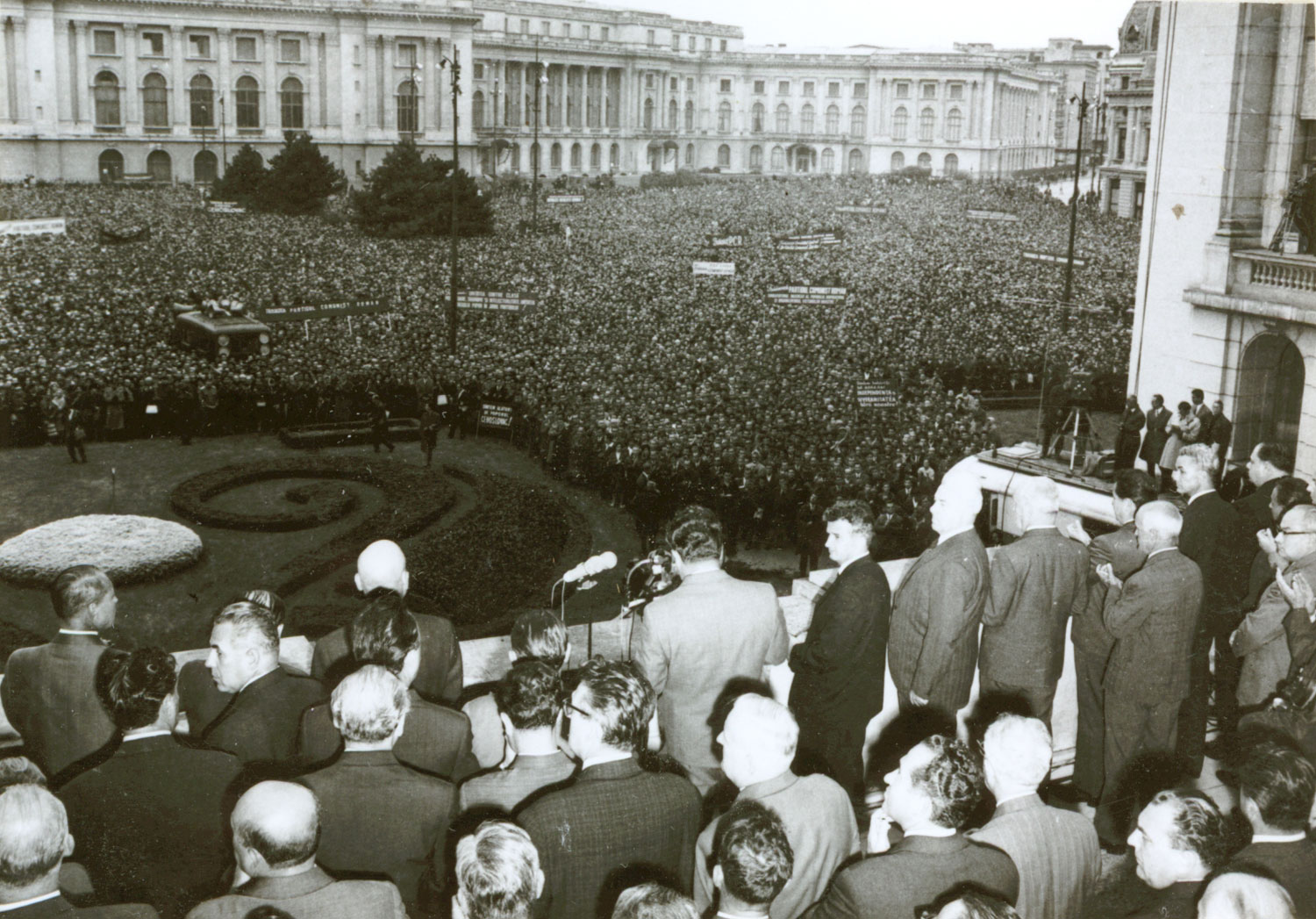
Palace Square, Bucharest on 21 August 1968

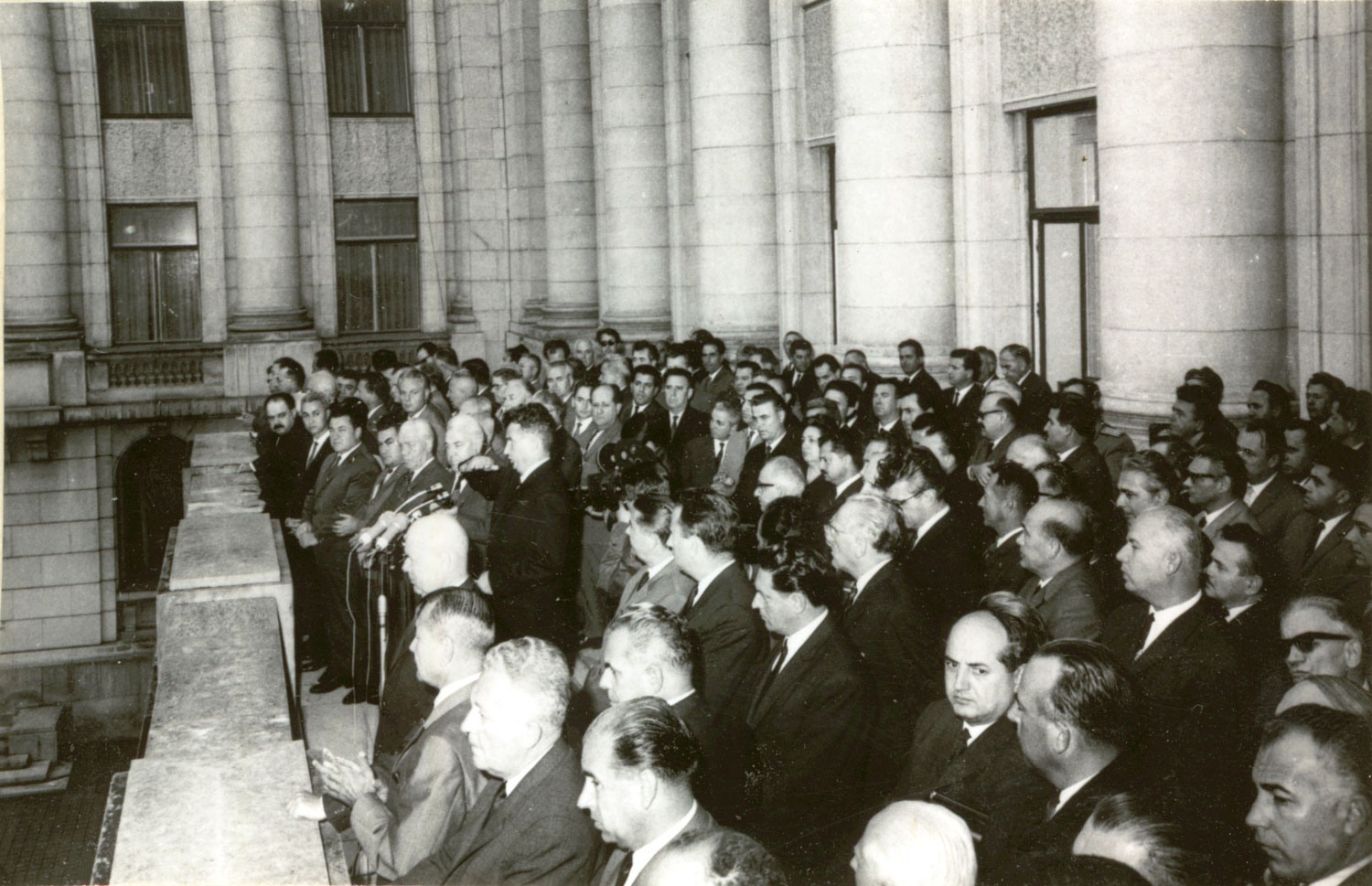
Ceaușescu gesticulating while giving his speech

Ceaușescu's speech of 21 August 1968 was a public address by Nicolae Ceaușescu, General Secretary of the Romanian Communist Party and President of the State Council of Romania, strongly condemning the Warsaw Pact invasion of Czechoslovakia. On the night of 20–21 August 1968, four Warsaw Pact nations (the Soviet Union, Bulgaria, Hungary and Poland) invaded Czechoslovakia in an effort to quell the reformist ideology of Alexander Dubček, the First Secretary of the Communist Party of Czechoslovakia.

On 21 August, in what became one of his most well-known speeches, Ceaușescu denounced the invasion in a public address before 100,000 people in Palace Square in Bucharest, calling the invasion a "grave error" that "constituted a serious danger to peace in Europe and for the prospects of world socialism". His address was perceived as a gesture of disobedience towards the Soviet Union both at home and abroad. The speech was part of the Romanian government's efforts since 1956 to assert its independence from Moscow.

Ceaușescu's response consolidated Romania's independent voice in the next two decades, with Ceaușescu encouraging the population to take up arms to meet any similar maneuver in the country. He received an enthusiastic initial response, with many people willing to enroll in the newly-formed paramilitary Patriotic Guards.

== See also ==
- De-satellization of the Socialist Republic of Romania
