= Revolution Square, Bucharest =

Square in central Bucharest

Coordinates: 44.44058°N 26.09646°E

Revolution Square (Romanian: Piața Revoluției) is a square in central Bucharest, on Calea Victoriei. Known as Palace Square (Romanian: Piața Palatului) until 1989, it was renamed after the Romanian Revolution of December 1989. The former Royal Palace (now the National Museum of Art of Romania), the Athenaeum, the Athénée Palace Hotel, the University of Bucharest Library and the Memorial of Rebirth are located here. The square also houses the building of the former Central Committee of the Romanian Communist Party (from where Nicolae Ceaușescu and his wife fled by helicopter on 22 December 1989). In 1990, the building became the seat of the Senate and since 2006 it houses the Ministry of Interior and Administrative Reform.

Prior to 1948, an equestrian statue of King Carol I of Romania stood in the square. Created in 1930 by the Croatian sculptor Ivan Meštrović, the statue was destroyed in 1948 by the Communists, who never paid damages to the sculptor. In 2005, the Romanian Minister of Culture decided to recreate the destroyed statue from a model that was kept by Meštrović's family. In 2007, the Bucharest City Hall assigned the project to the sculptor Florin Codre. The statue's design, inspired by Meštrović's model, has been accused of plagiarism. The statue was unveiled in December 2010.

In August 1968 and December 1989, the square was the site of two mass meetings which represented the apogee and the nadir of Ceaușescu's regime. Ceaușescu's speech of 21 August 1968 marked the highest point in Ceaușescu's popularity, when he openly condemned the Soviet invasion of Czechoslovakia and started pursuing a policy of independence from Kremlin. Ceaușescu's speech of 21 December 1989 was meant to emulate the 1968 assembly and presented by the official media as a "spontaneous movement of support for Ceaușescu", erupting into the popular revolt which led to the end of the regime.

== Image gallery ==
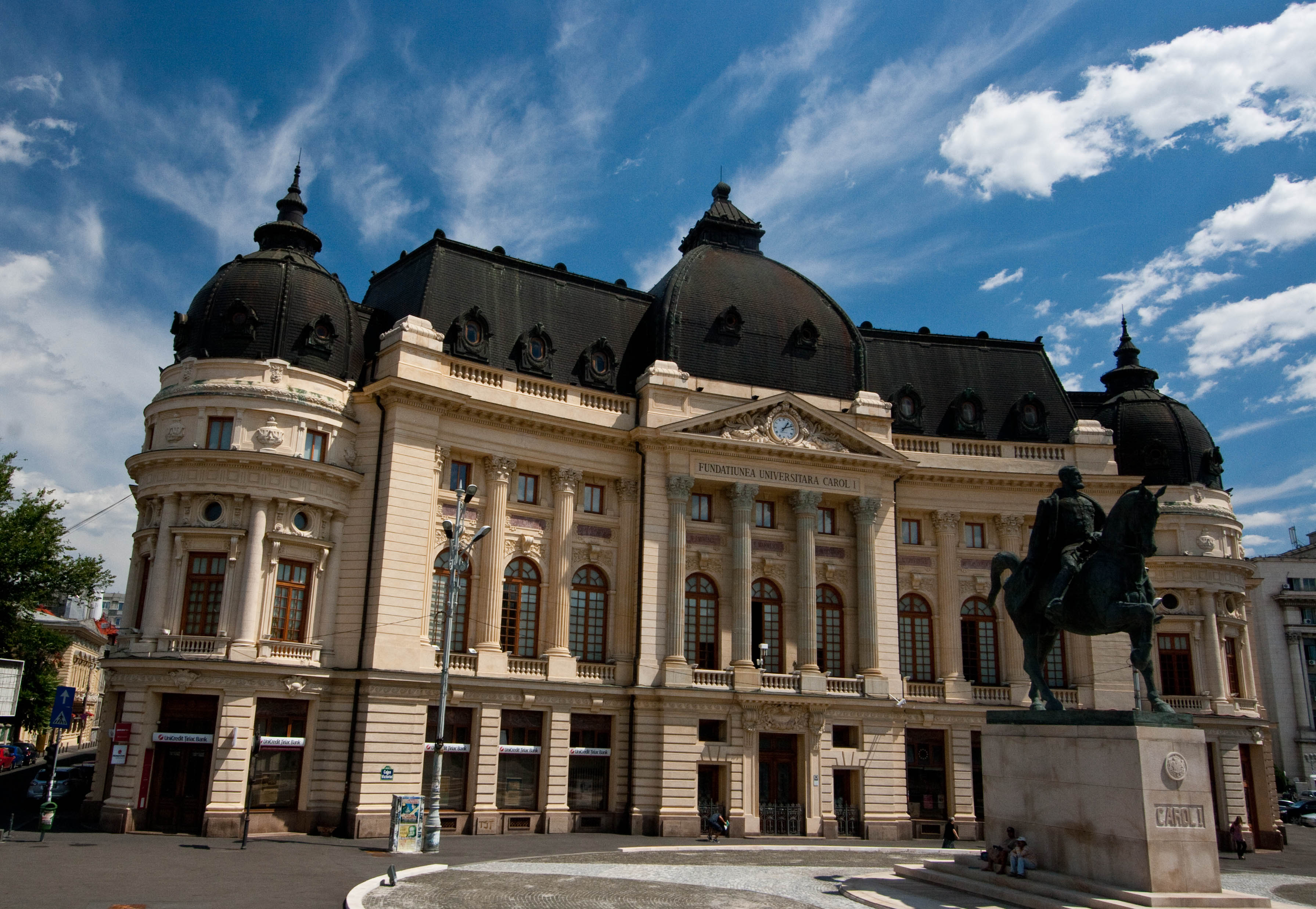
University of Bucharest Library

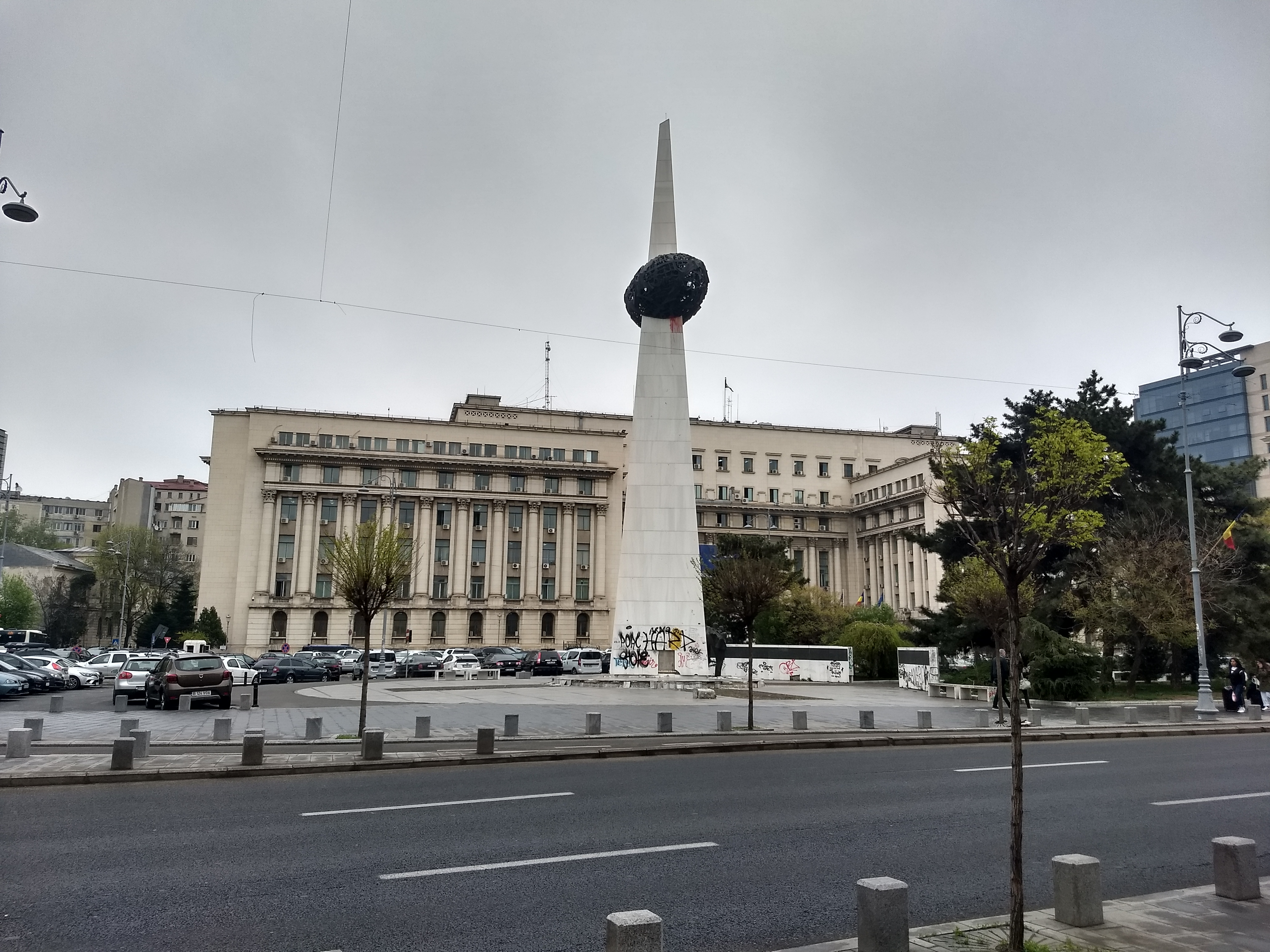

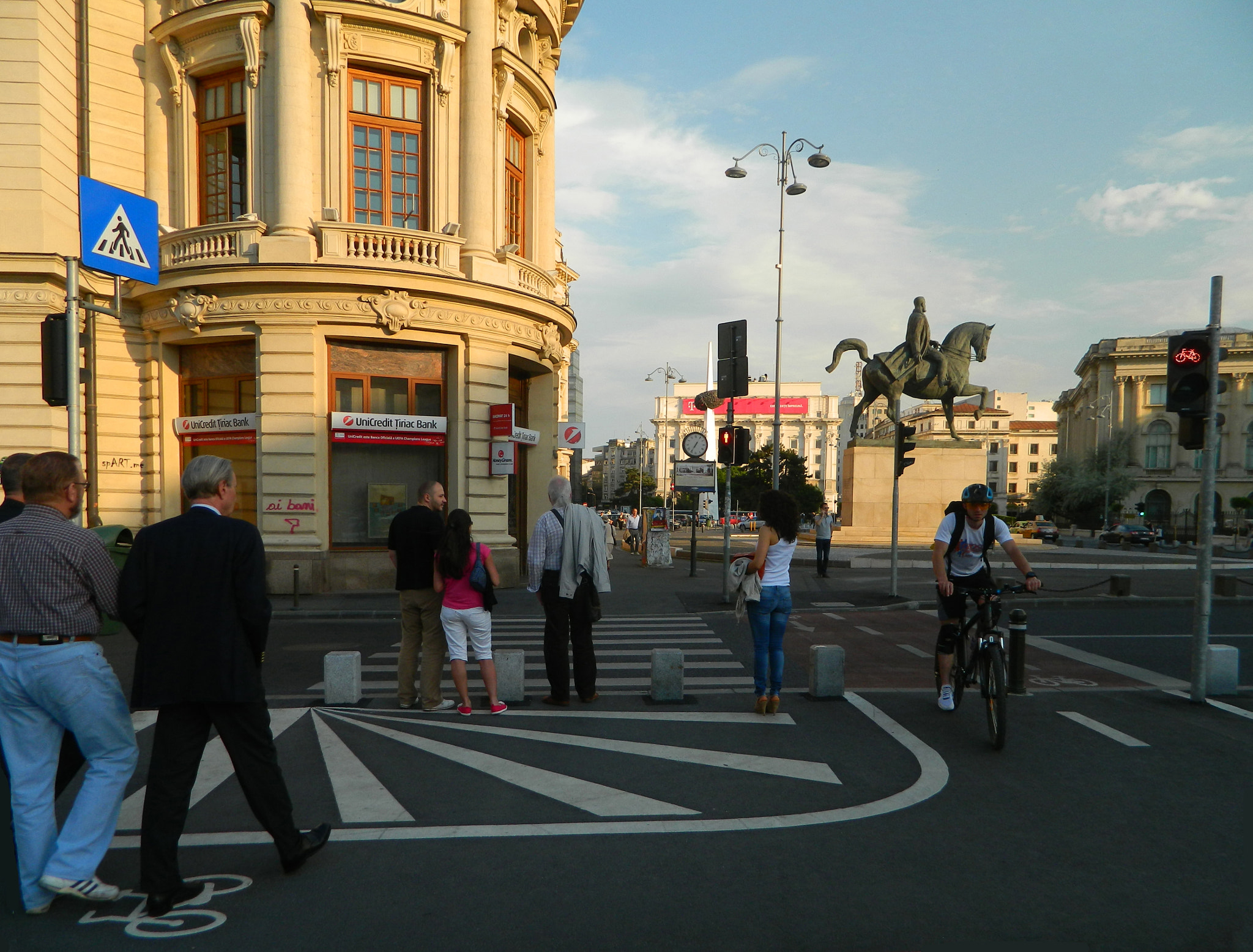
