= Memorial of Rebirth =

Heritage site in Bucharest, Romania

- Memorialul renașterii – Glorie Eternă Eroilor și Revoluției Române din Decembrie 1989 (Romanian)
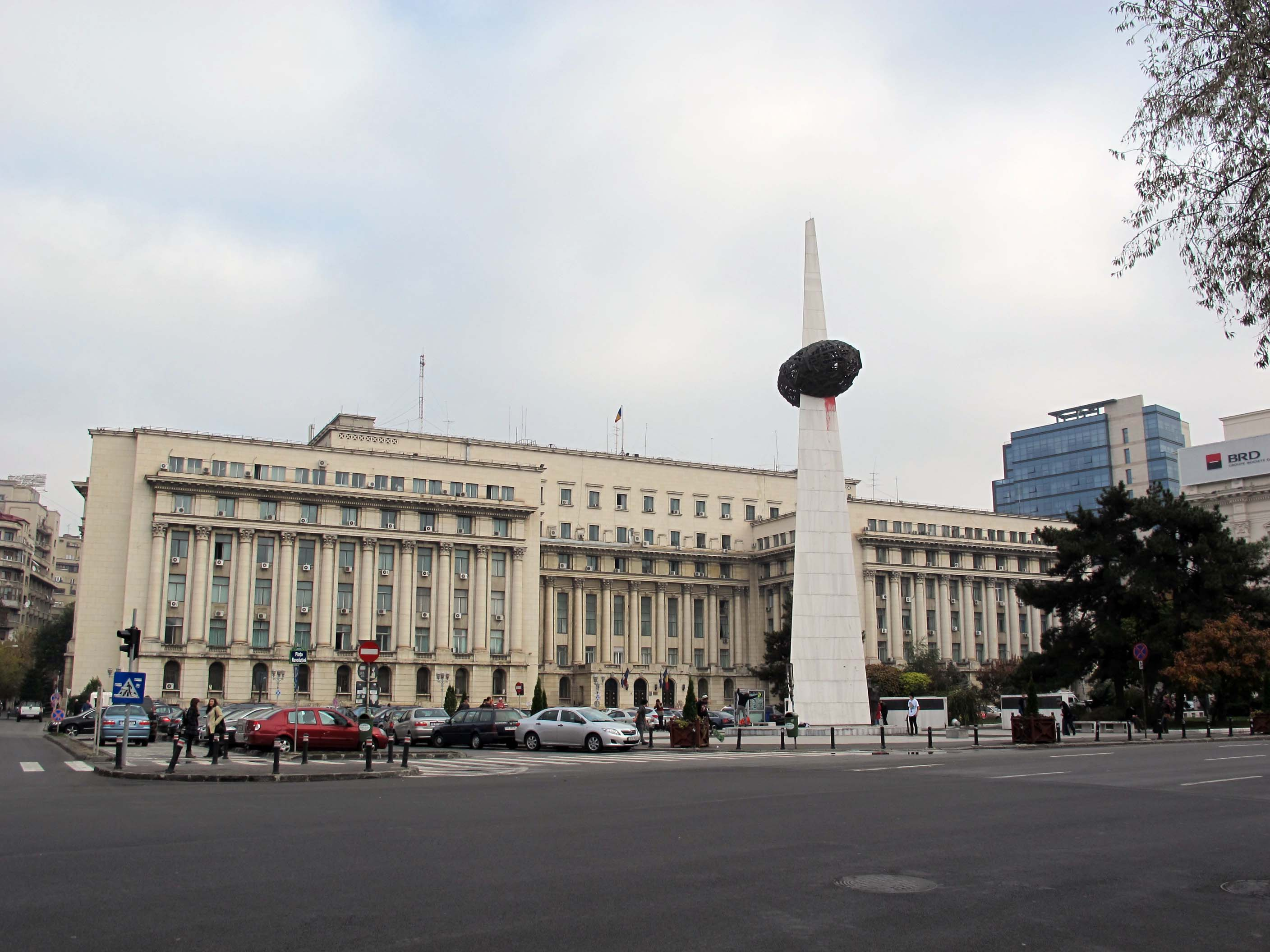
- Interactive map of Memorial of Rebirth
- Location: Revolution Square, Bucharest, Romania
- Coordinates: 44.43891°N 26.09745°E
- Designer: Alexandru Ghilduș
- Type: memorial
- Material: marble, metal
- Height: 25 metres (82 feet)
- Beginning date: December 15, 2004
- Completion date: August 1, 2005
- Dedicated to: Victims of the Romanian Revolution of 1989

The Memorial of Rebirth (Memorialul Renașterii in Romanian) is a memorial in Bucharest, Romania that commemorates the struggles and victims of the Romanian Revolution of 1989, which overthrew Communism. The memorial complex was inaugurated in August 2005 in Revolution Square, where Romania's Communist-era dictator, Nicolae Ceaușescu, was publicly overthrown in December 1989.

The memorial, designed by Alexandru Ghilduș, features as its centrepiece a 25-metre-high marble pillar reaching up to the sky, upon which a metal "crown" is placed. The obelisk is surrounded by a 600 m^{2} (6,500 sq ft) plaza covered by marble and granite.

The memorial cost 5.6 million lei (RON 5.6 million, ROL 56 billion, approximately €1.2 million). Its initial name was "Eternal Glory to the Heroes and the Romanian Revolution of December 1989" (Glorie Eternă Eroilor și Revoluției Române din Decembrie 1989). The memorial's name alludes to Romania's rebirth as a nation after the collapse of Communism.

== Controversy ==
Despite a commonly acknowledged need for a memorial commemorating Romania's 1989 revolution, the monument sparked a significant amount of controversy when it was inaugurated in 2005, mainly to do with its design. Many artists stated that the memorial, especially its central pillar, was devoid of any symbolism, being too abstract, and thus didn't adequately represent the suffering and magnitude of the 1989 revolution, which claimed around 1,500 lives.

Others stated that they personally didn't like the aesthetics of the design; the Mayor of Bucharest, Adriean Videanu, stated, "It's a question of taste. I personally don't like it. I don't understand its symbolism." There was also controversy because the designer, Ghilduş, was an applied artist, designing objects like chairs and lamps, rather than a sculptor.

The art critic Mihai Oroveanu said, "Alexandru Ghilduș doesn't have the qualifications to undertake such a work, since he is a designer, not a sculptor". The Memorial of Rebirth has been described as "the impaled potato", "a potato skewered on a stake", an "olive on a toothpick", "the potato of the revolution" and "the vector with the crown".

The placement of the memorial was also criticized and the Urbanism Committees of both the 3rd Sector and of Bucharest rejected the design, but their role is officially only as consultants and the memorial was erected anyway.

== Vandalism ==
Owing to its relative unpopularity, the monument is guarded round-the-clock. Despite this, on the night of 12 May 2006, it was vandalized with a stencil graffiti figure representing the fictional revolutionary character "V" on the side facing the National Museum of Art. Previously, in 2005, the Romanian contemporary artist Vlad Nancă tagged the monument in stencil graffiti around it and on Bucharest walls as the "Monument of errors" (erori in Romanian) instead of "heroes" (eroi in Romanian), calling the obelisk a "horrid phallic grotesque thing" that disparages the sacrifice of the heroes of the 1989 Revolution.

In 2012 the monument was defaced again with a splash of bright red paint that was delivered just at the bottom of the monument's "potato" by the street artist Keo as an indication of the bloodshed the monument is supposed to commemorate. The red paint makes the monument to look as though it is bleeding. The paint is so inaccessibly high that it has remained in place since it was placed there.
