= Palace of Agriculture, Brăila =

20th-century palace in Brăila, Romania

Coordinates: 45°15′50″N 27°58′6″E

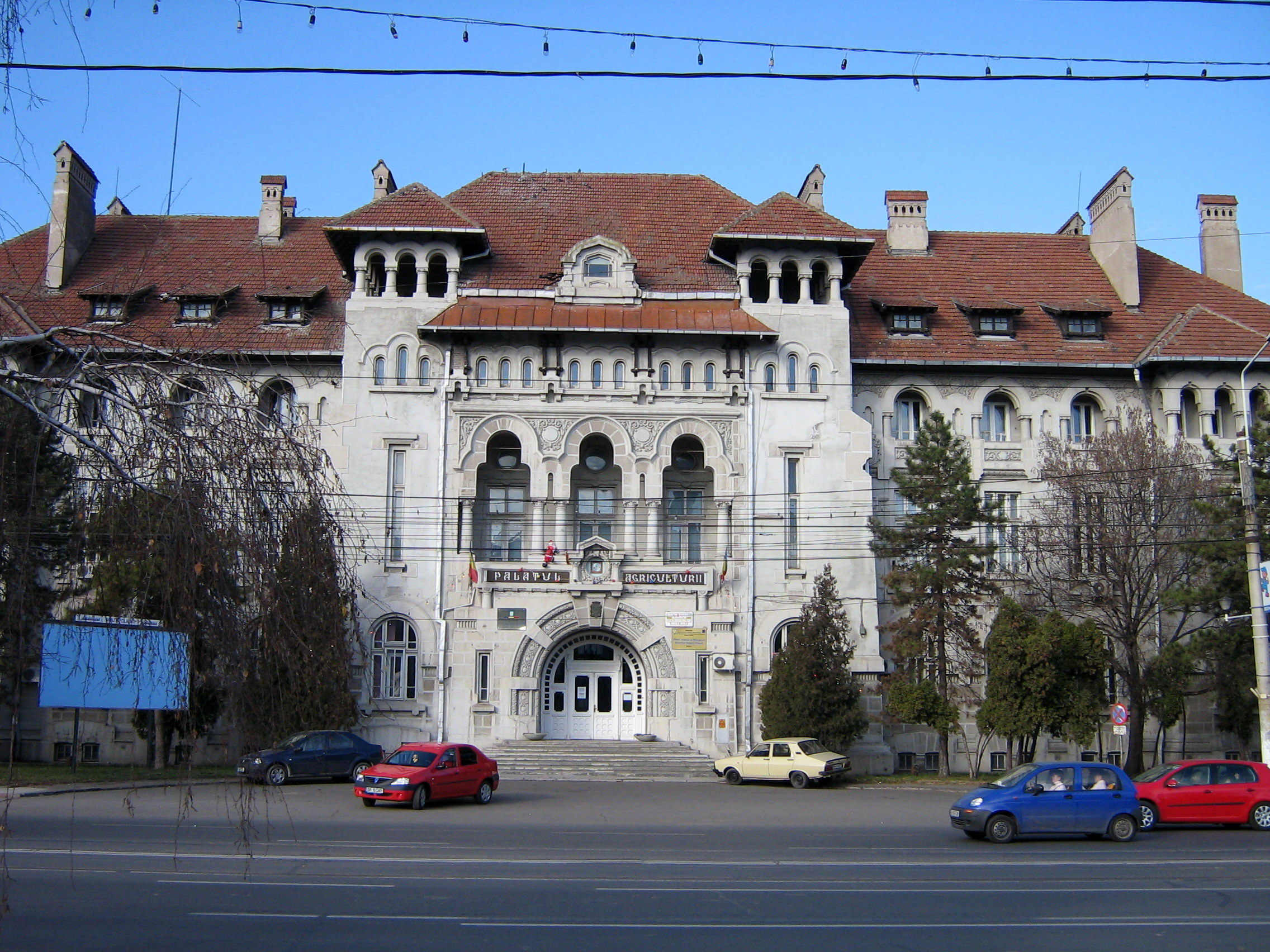
The Palace of Agriculture of Brăila

The Palace of Agriculture (Romanian: Palatul Agriculturii) is a palace of Romanian Revival architectural style in Brăila. Its construction started on 15 July 1923 and ended in 1929. The construction of the palace was first proposed by prefect Șerban Răducanu with the support of Alexandru C. Constantinescu, the Agriculture and Domains Minister at the time. It was built to encompass all the functions of the ministry within Brăila under one single building, as well as to serve as a place for conferences and reunions and to host a museum on Romanian agriculture.

According to former PSD county councillor Petre Candidatu, the original equestrian statue of Carol I could have been buried in front of the Palace of Agriculture in Brăila by Soviet forces during their occupation of Romania in World War II as they established their headquarters on the city.
