= Equestrian statue of Carol I =

Statue in Bucharest

Coordinates: 44°26′22.8″N 26°5′49.2″E

The equestrian statue of Carol I is a monument in Romania, situated in the central zone of Bucharest, on Calea Victoriei.

The massive statue, cast in bronze, represents Carol I of Romania, the first King of Romania, mounted on his horse. The founder of the Romanian Dynasty, during his reign Romania conquered its independence from the Ottoman Empire, in 1877, in the course the Russo-Turkish War, known in Romania as the War of Independence.

The statue is located on Calea Victoriei and stands in Piața Palatului (a square that was renamed "The Revolution Square" after the bloody events of 1989, opposite the National Museum of Art of Romania (the former royal palace) and in front of the Central University Library, Bucharest.

== The old King Carol I statue by Ivan Meštrović ==
The first equestrian statue of King Carol I in Bucharest was created in 1939 by the Croatian sculptor Ivan Meštrović. The inauguration was held on Romania's National Day of May 10, 1939. Because the monument stood in a large square opposite the Royal Palace, it witnessed many significant events of the inter-war era and during World War II, becoming one of the well-known visual symbols of Bucharest, present on numerous photos, postcards, etc.

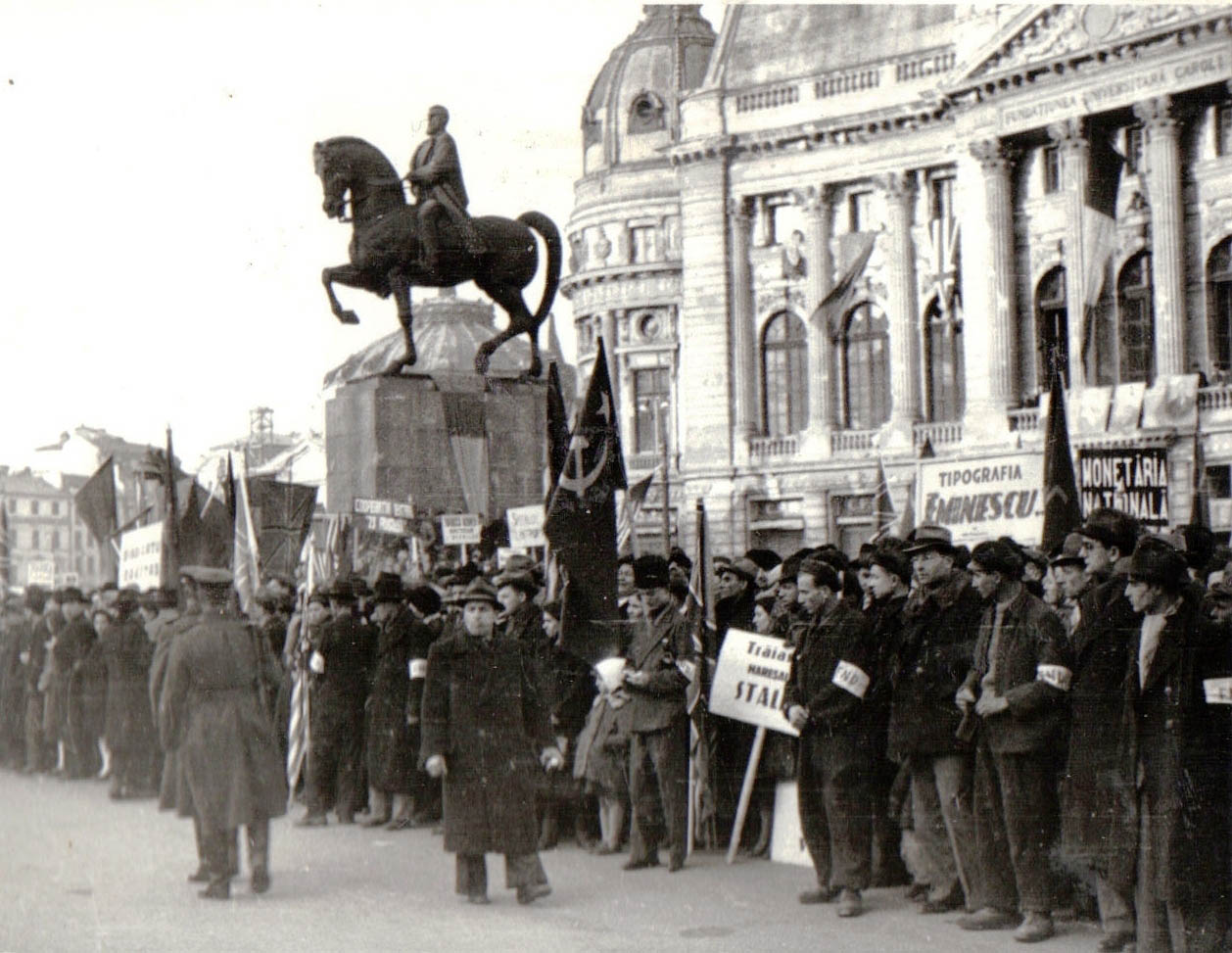
Celebrations in Bucharest marking the return of Northern Transylvania. 14 March 1945

In the night of December 30/31, 1947, after King Michael I abdicated the throne, the Communist government demolished the statue—an important visual symbol of monarchy—from its pedestal. The statue was destroyed in 1948.

== The new King Carol I statue by Florin Codre ==
In 2007, 18 years after the Romanian anti-Communist Revolution, the Bucharest City Hall decided to recreate the destroyed statue and locate it at the original place. A small-scale model of Meštrović's original work was in possession of the sculptor's family, but an agreement was never signed, due to City Hall's inability to meet the financial requirements.

Romanian sculptor Florin Codre was tasked to create a new statue, visually similar to Meštrović's, but not an exact copy.

The inauguration of the new statue took place on December 6, 2010, with Princess Margareta of Romania, heiress of the Romanian Royal Family and her husband, Prince Radu, assisting. The Mayor of Bucharest, Sorin Oprescu, was present, as well as academicians Constantin Bălăceanu-Stolnici, ex-Presidents Ion Iliescu and Emil Constantinescu and Prime Minister Călin Popescu-Tăriceanu. A message from the former king Michael I was read on the occasion.

Since then, the statue has regained its public significance as a tourist sightseeing place in Bucharest. Various public events are periodically held in front of it, especially the annual festivity of May 10, connected with several events related to Romanian monarchy: Carol I's first arrival in Bucharest (in 1866), Carol's formal approval of the declaration of independence proclaimed on May 9, 1877, and Carol I's coronation as King of Romania (in 1881).

== Possible survival of the old King Carol I statue ==
There are rumors that the old statue of King Carol I is currently buried in front of the Palace of Agriculture in Brăila, where Soviet occupying forces would have located it during World War II.

It is also possible that the house of the equestrian statue was used for another statue for the Russian general Alexander Suvorov located in Dragosloveni, but this is not confirmed.
