= Royal Palace of Bucharest =

Building in Bucharest, Romania

- Palatul Regal din București

General information
- Location: 49–53 Calea Victoriei, 010063 Bucharest, sector 1, Bucharest, Romania
- Coordinates: 44.439362°N 26.095943°E
- Current tenants: National Museum of Art of Romania
- Groundbreaking: 1812
- Completed: 1937
- Renovated: 2013
- Owner: Government of Romania

Technical details
- Floor count: 4

Design and construction
- Architect: Nicolae Nenciulescu

Website
- https://www.mnar.arts.ro/

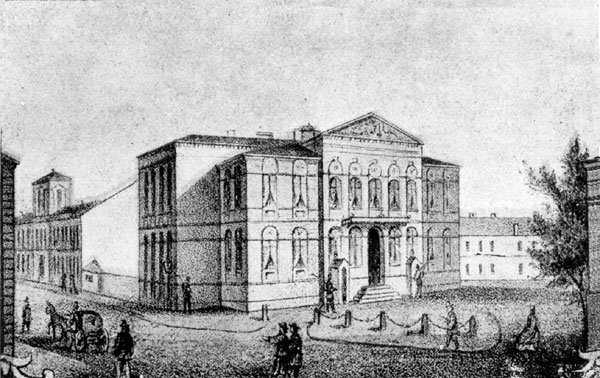
The Golescu mansion in 1866

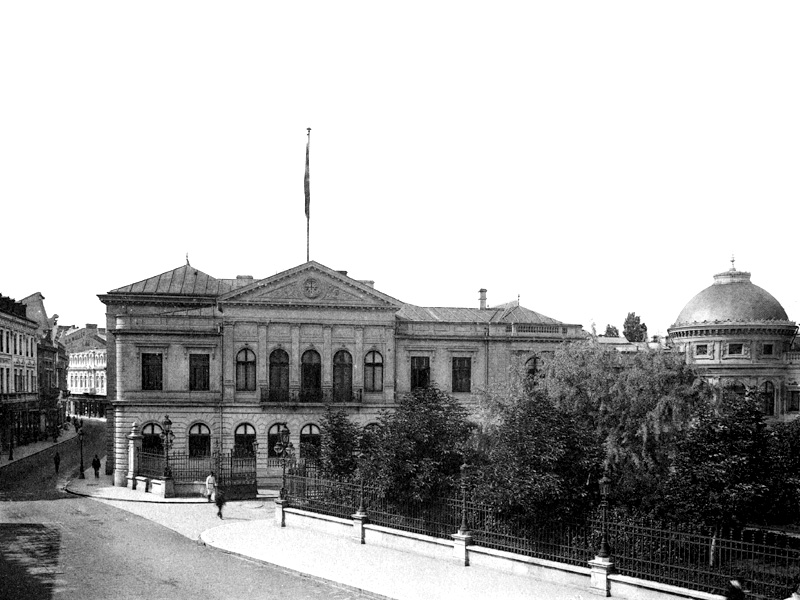
The Golescu mansion around the start of the 20th century

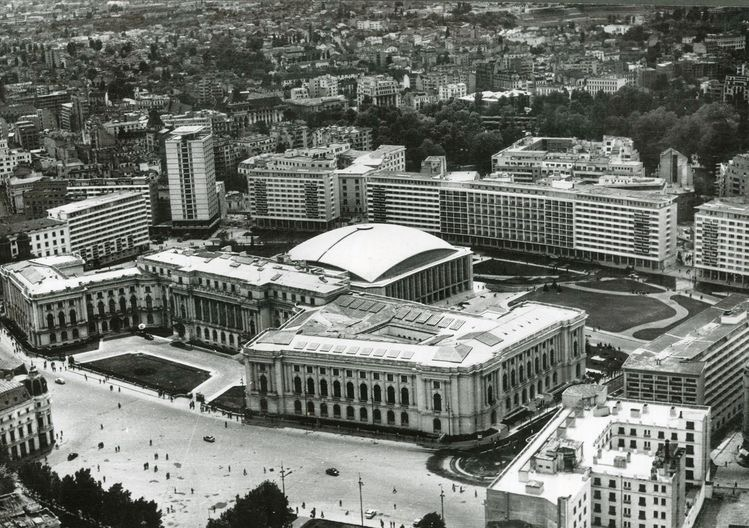
The Royal Palace from the air during Communist times, with the multipurpose hall 'Sala Palatului' behind

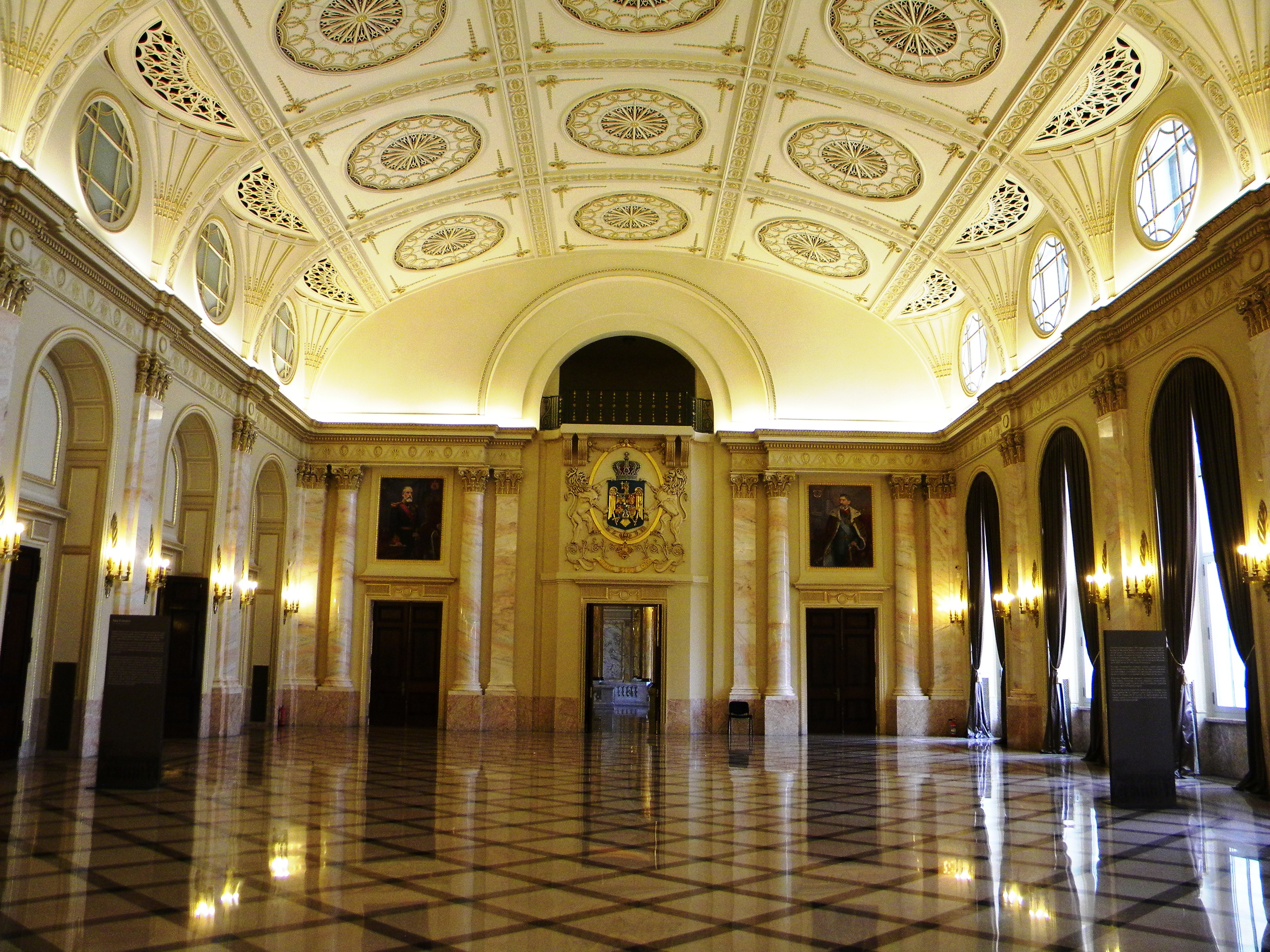
The Throne Hall, restored after 1989. The Royal Coat of Arms of Romania, middle version, is visible at center, with pictures of King Carol I (left) and King Ferdinand I (right) around it

The Royal Palace (Romanian: Palatul Regal) of Bucharest, known as Palace of the Republic (Romanian: Palatul Republicii) between 1948 and 1990, is a monumental building situated in the capital of Romania, on Calea Victoriei. The palace in its various incarnations served as official residence for the kings of Romania until 1947, when the communist regime was installed after Michael I of Romania's forced abdication. Since 1950, the palace hosts the National Museum of Art of Romania. The Romanian royal family currently uses Elisabeta Palace as its official residence in Bucharest. In addition, the Romanian government allows the royal family to use the Royal Palace on different occasions.

The palace is the largest and most significant royal residence in the country, containing emblematic official spaces such as the Throne Hall, the Royal Dining Hall and the monumental Voivodes' Staircase. An equestrian statue of the first king of Romania, Carol I stands in the center of a large square in front of it, traditionally known as the Palace Square (Romanian: Piața Palatului), but renamed Revolution Square after the Romanian revolution of 1989.

== History ==
=== The old Royal Palace – Golescu Mansion (1812–1937) ===
Between 1812 and 1815, the Golescu Mansion was built at the place of the present Royal Palace. It belonged to stolnic Dinicu Golescu, a high-ranking aristocrat (boyar). The house was built in Neoclassical style and had 25 rooms, a quite large house for the Bucharest of that era. In 1837, the Golescu Mansion became the official residence of Prince (Hospodar) of Wallachia, Alexandru II Ghica. From 1859 to 1866, the Prince (styled Domnitor after 1862) of the United Principalities of Wallachia and Moldavia, Alexandru Ioan Cuza, used the Golescu Mansion as his official residence.

In February 1866, Cuza was removed from the throne by a political coalition of Liberals and Conservatives (see "Monstrous coalition") and the German Prince Karl of Hohenzollern-Sigmaringen (who would rule as Carol I) was invited to become Domnitor of the country, by then officially known as Romania. On 10 May 1866, Prince Carol I arrived in Bucharest for the first time and the aristocrats offered him the Golescu Mansion as state residence. During his reign, king Carol I made various changes to the mansion. After gaining its independence from the Ottoman Empire in the Russo-Turkish War, Romania was proclaimed a kingdom in 1881, with the mansion now serving as Royal Palace. As the Golescu mansion was neither large enough nor had it the appropriate spaces for official duties, it was enlarged by a new wing, which included the main state rooms such as the throne hall.

In 1926, a fire destroyed the main building of the old Royal Palace. The royal family then used Cotroceni Palace as its official residence in Bucharest (Cotroceni was built by King Carol I as a residence for the young couple Ferdinand and Maria, during their tenure as Crown Princes). Since a total renovation was necessary, the remains of the old palace were demolished during the ample reconstruction performed in 1936–1937.

=== The new Royal Palace (1937–47) ===
The new Royal Palace, as it stands today, was erected between 1936 and 1937 under the direct supervision of Queen Marie and her son, King Carol II. The architect of the building was Nicolae Nenciulescu. During World War II, a complete reconstruction of the place before the palace was planned, but this architectural project was never completed.

Until 24 August 1944, a villa, called Casa Nouă ("The New House"), existed behind the Royal Palace, on the site occupied nowadays by the Sala Palatului concert hall. This was the house in which the royal family actually lived, since the new Royal Palace contained mainly official, large spaces. An alley existed between Casa Nouă and the palace, requiring visitors to go outdoor when passing from one to the other.

It is in villa Casa Nouă that the arrest of Marshall Ion Antonescu took place in the afternoon of 23 August 1944, during the coup led by King Michael that overthrew the pro-Nazi regime of Antonescu and resulted in Romania's switching sides to the Allies. The following day, a retaliation bombardment performed by the German Luftwaffe completely destroyed Casa Nouă and seriously affected the Royal Palace. On 24 August 1944, the day after King Mihai and his alles removed the government led by Ion Antonescu from power, the Royal Palace was severely damaged by the bombing of the German Luftwaffe aviation, which occurred as reprisal.

After 24 August 1944, with the Royal Palace made uninhabitable by the German bombardment and Cotroceni Palace still not recovered after the disastrous earthquake on 10 November 1940, the Romanian royal family missed again a functional Bucharest residence. King Michael asked his aunt, Princess Elisabeta of Romania, former Queen Consort of Greece, to allow the court to use her villa in Herăstrău Park (nowadays known as the Elisabeta Palace). The Elisabeta Palace would serve as the residence of the royal family until 1947, when Michael I was forced to abdicate and left in exile, and again after 1997, when the family was returned several former properties.

In 1945, the Throne Hall in the Royal Palace was superficially repaired, in a hurry, to host the ceremony of decoration for King Michael I, by the Soviets. They awarded the King the Order of Victory, their highest military decoration, for his merit in the 1944 coup. For the same reason, the King was awarded the Legion of Merit at highest degree (Chief Commander) by U.S. president Harry S. Truman, a year later.

=== The Royal Palace during the Communist regime (1947–89) ===
During communist rule, the Royal Palace in Bucharest was used to host the National Museum of Art of Romania.

The Throne Hall in the palace was renamed as "Sala Consiliului de Stat" ("The Hall of the State's Council") and used by subsequent leaders of Romania – such as Nicolae Ceaușescu – for various political events. During that era, all symbols reminding of the monarchy, such as the throne armchair itself, the great royal coat of arms on the walls and others, were removed. Behind the Royal Palace, a multi-purpose hall was built between 1959 and 1960 on the site where the royal residence called "Casa Nouă" was located, which now serves as a concert and conference hall 'Sala Palatului'.

In 1965, the Hall of the State's Council was used for the lying-in-state of deceased leader Gheorghe Gheorghiu-Dej, with Romanian people encouraged to pay the last respects.

=== The Royal Palace after the Romanian Revolution of 1989 ===
After its anti-Communist Revolution of 1989, Romania remained under a republican government and the former Royal Palace continued to host the National Museum of Art. During the events in December 1989, with violent armed confrontations on the streets, the palace was again seriously damaged and partially burnt, the art works of the National Museum inside it being put at great risk. The main halls in the Royal Palace were generally restored after the regime change – with the most ample restoration work completed in 2013 – and are now opened to tourists.

After the Romanian Revolution, former King Michael and his wife, Anne, were allowed for a first visit in the country in April 1992 (despite their attempts to do that immediately after the events). The two-day visit was a historical event, with the monarchist press claiming more than one million people were cheering the King in the streets. After that, the Romanian post-Communist authorities denied him a second visit – until 1997. Then, a newly installed government under Victor Ciorbea abolished the Communist decree which banned the King's Romanian citizenship, effectively allowing him to regain ID documents and free pass throughout the country.

In August 2016, the coffin of Anne, King Michael's spouse, was laid in the Throne Hall for two days, before her burial in Curtea de Argeș, with thousands of Romanians paying homages. Also in December 2017, the funeral of king Michael took place out of the Royal Palace.

== Literature ==
- St. Noica, Nicolae (2009). Palatul Regal Muzeul National de Arta al Romaniei (in Romanian). Bucarest: Cadmos. p. 143. ISBN 978-606-92162-2-4.
- Ion, Narcis Dorin (2013). Palate din Bucuresti (in Romanian). Bucarest: Noi Media Print. p. 207. ISBN 978-606-572-026-8.
- Badea-Paun, Gabriel (2017). De la Palatul Domnesc de pe Podul Mogosoaiei La Palatul Regal de pe Calea Victoriei Arhitectura si decoruri (1866-1947) (in Romanian). Bucarest: Corint. p. 141. ISBN 978-606-793-205-8.

== Image gallery ==
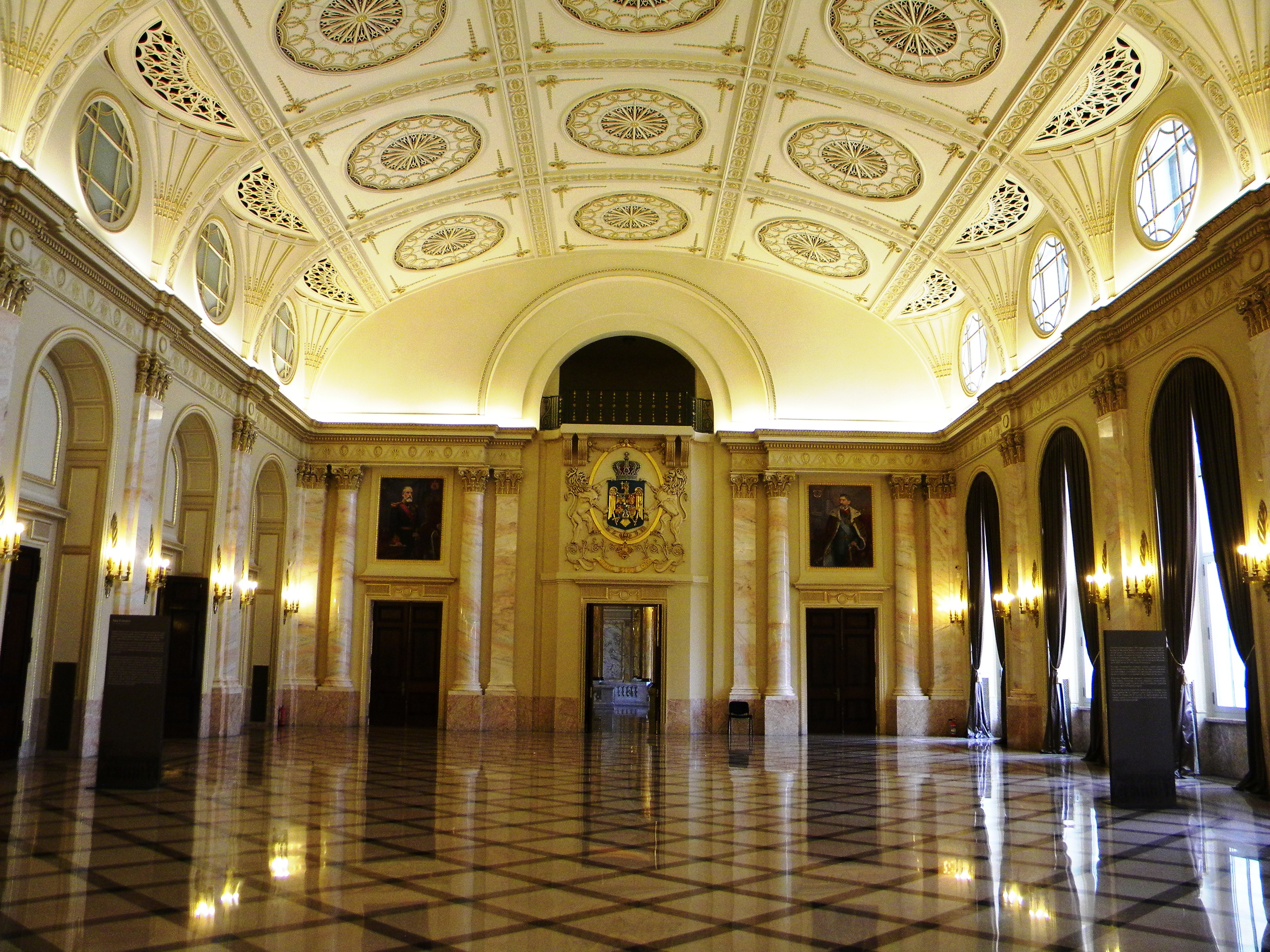
The Throne Hall, restored after 1989

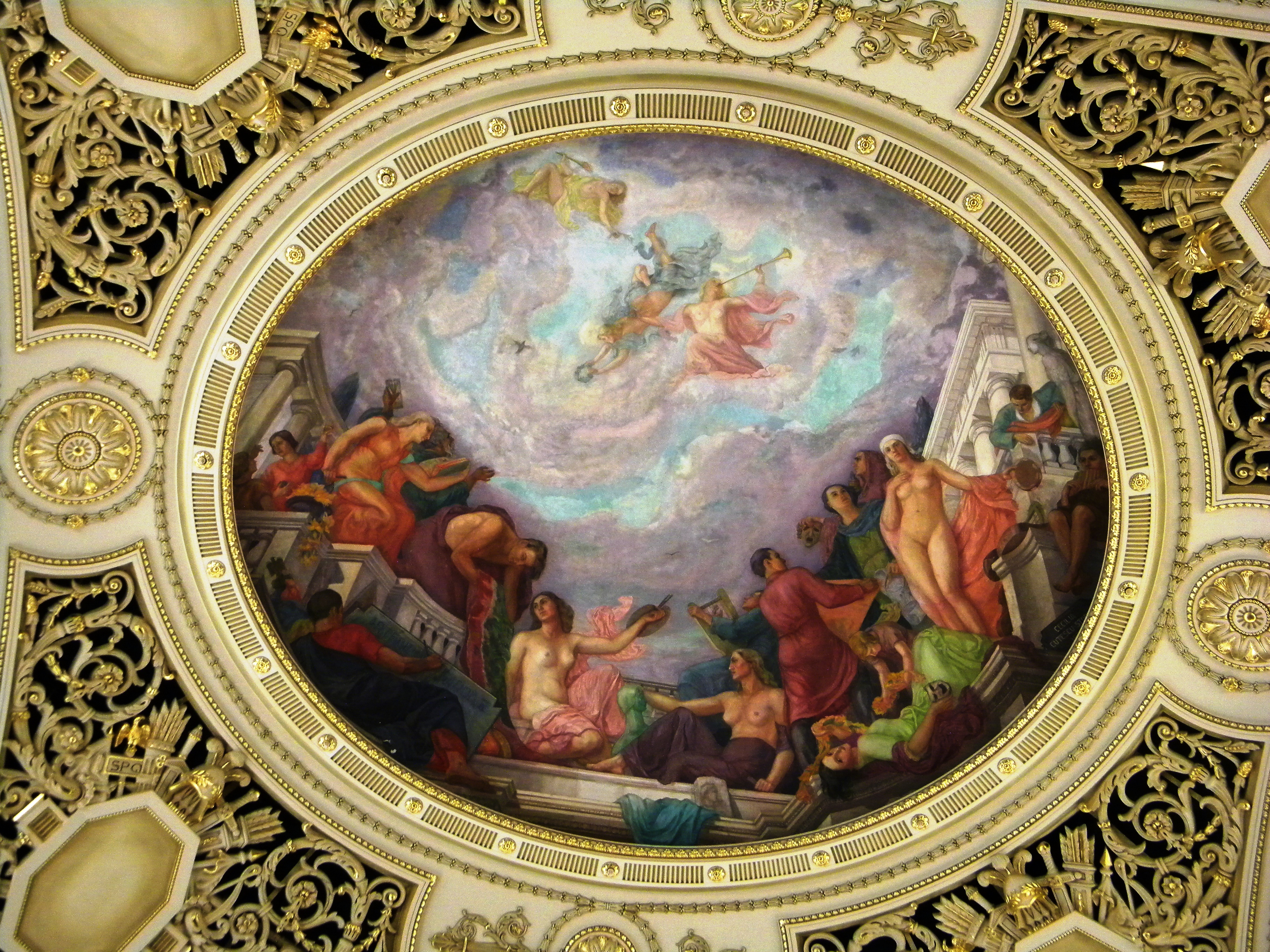
Ceiling details in the Throne Hall.

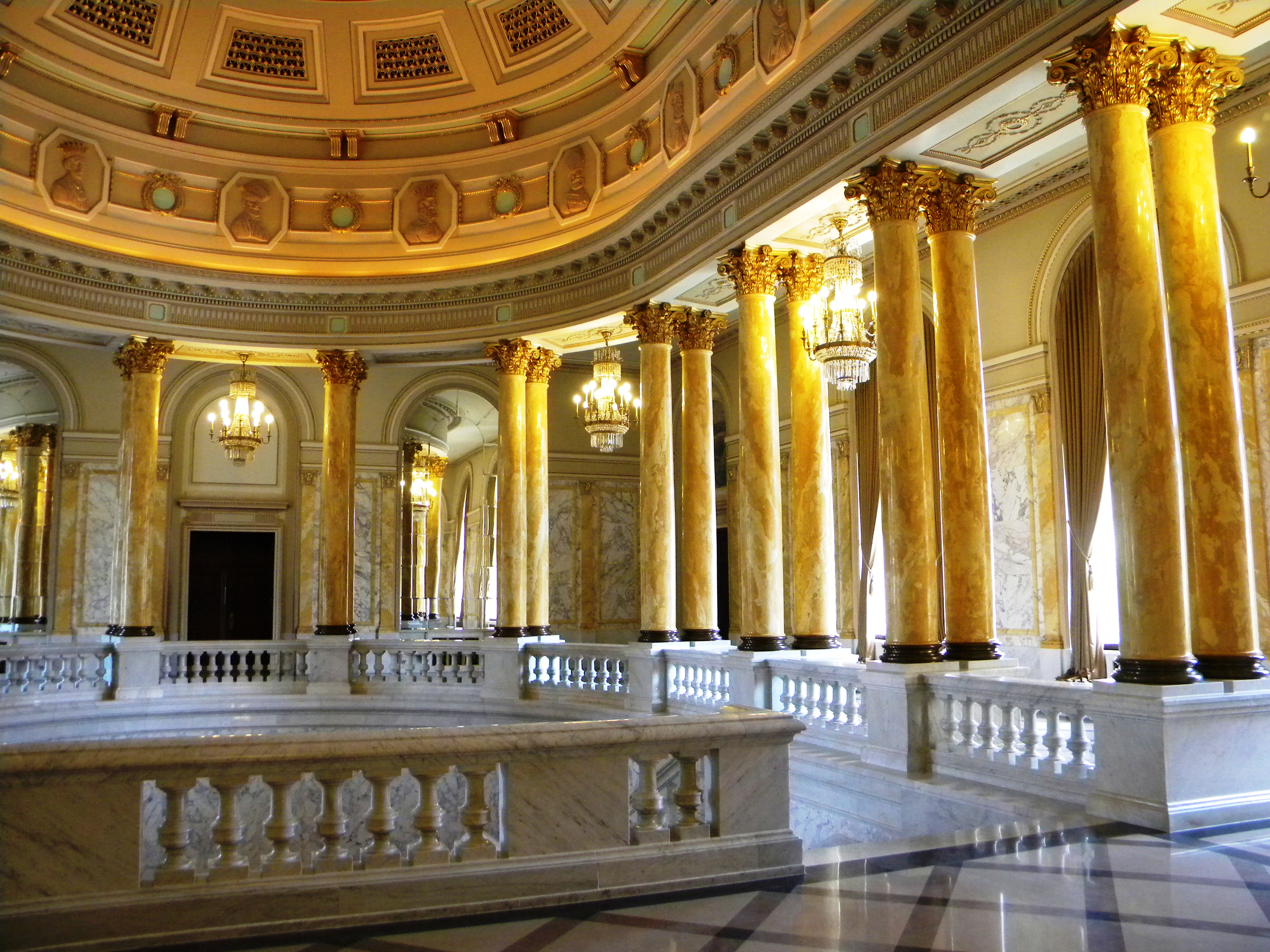
Entering The Voivodes' Staircase at first floor.

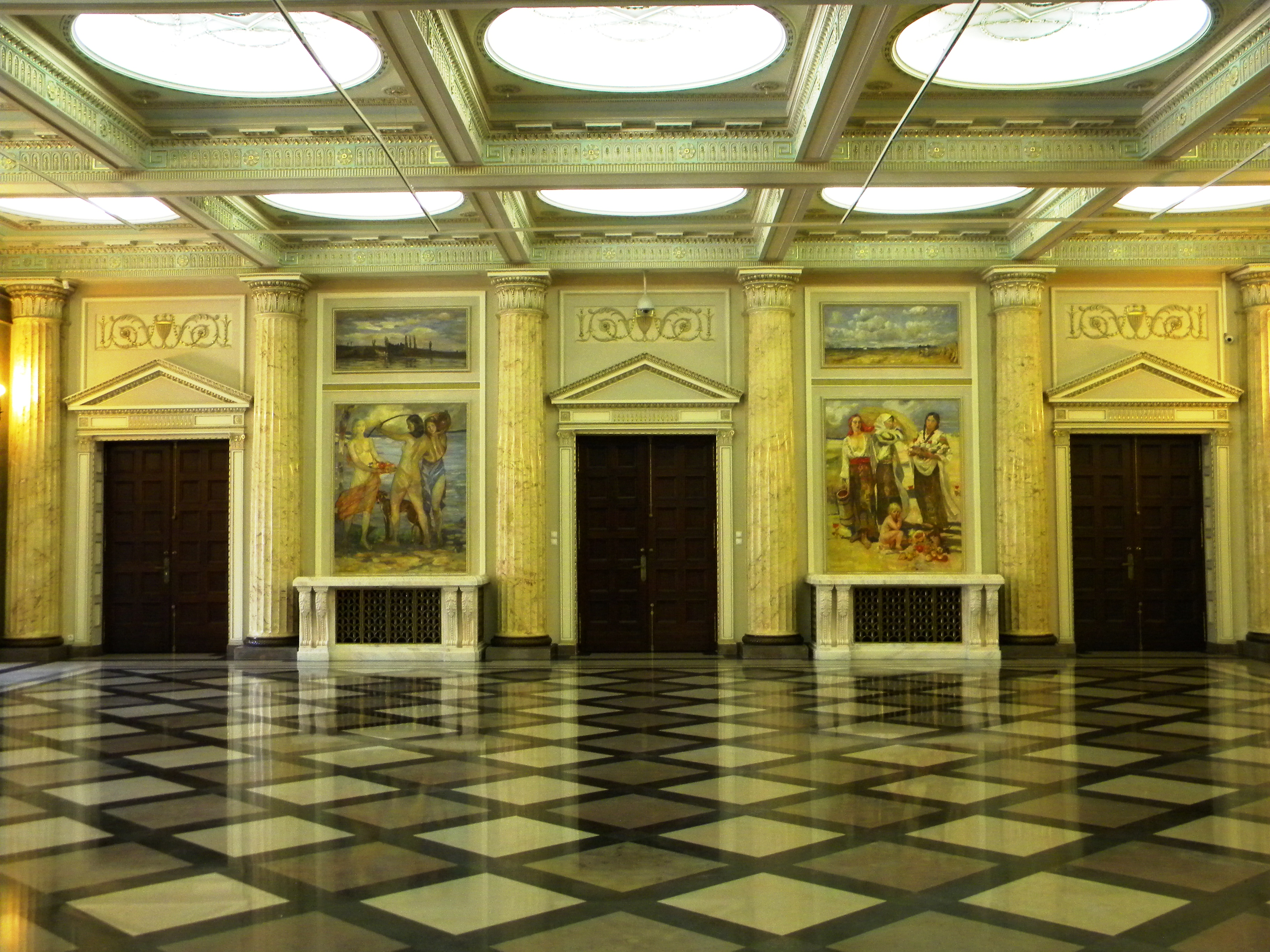
The Royal Dining Room, ground floor.

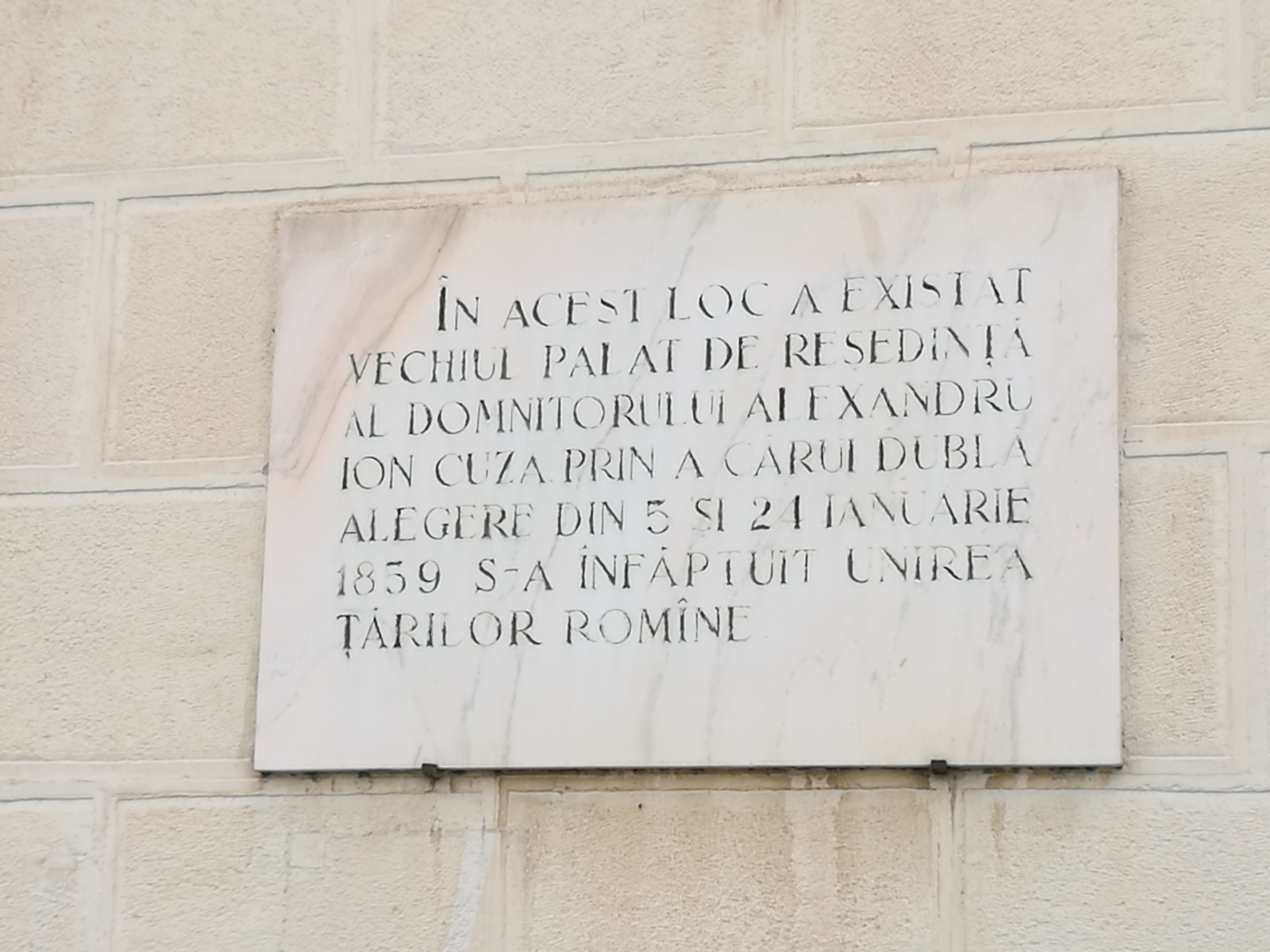
Commemorative plaque for the Unification of Moldavia and Wallachia

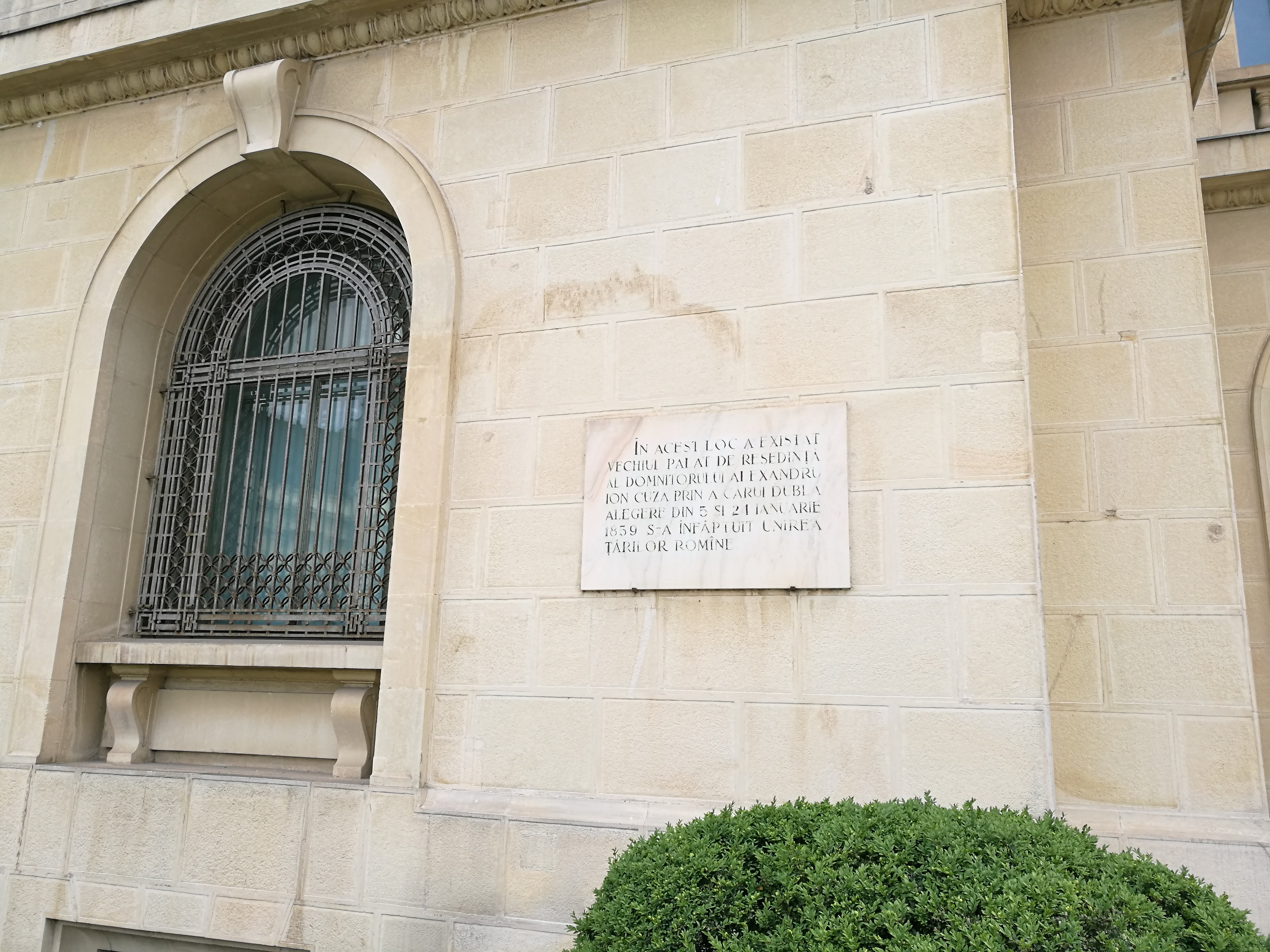

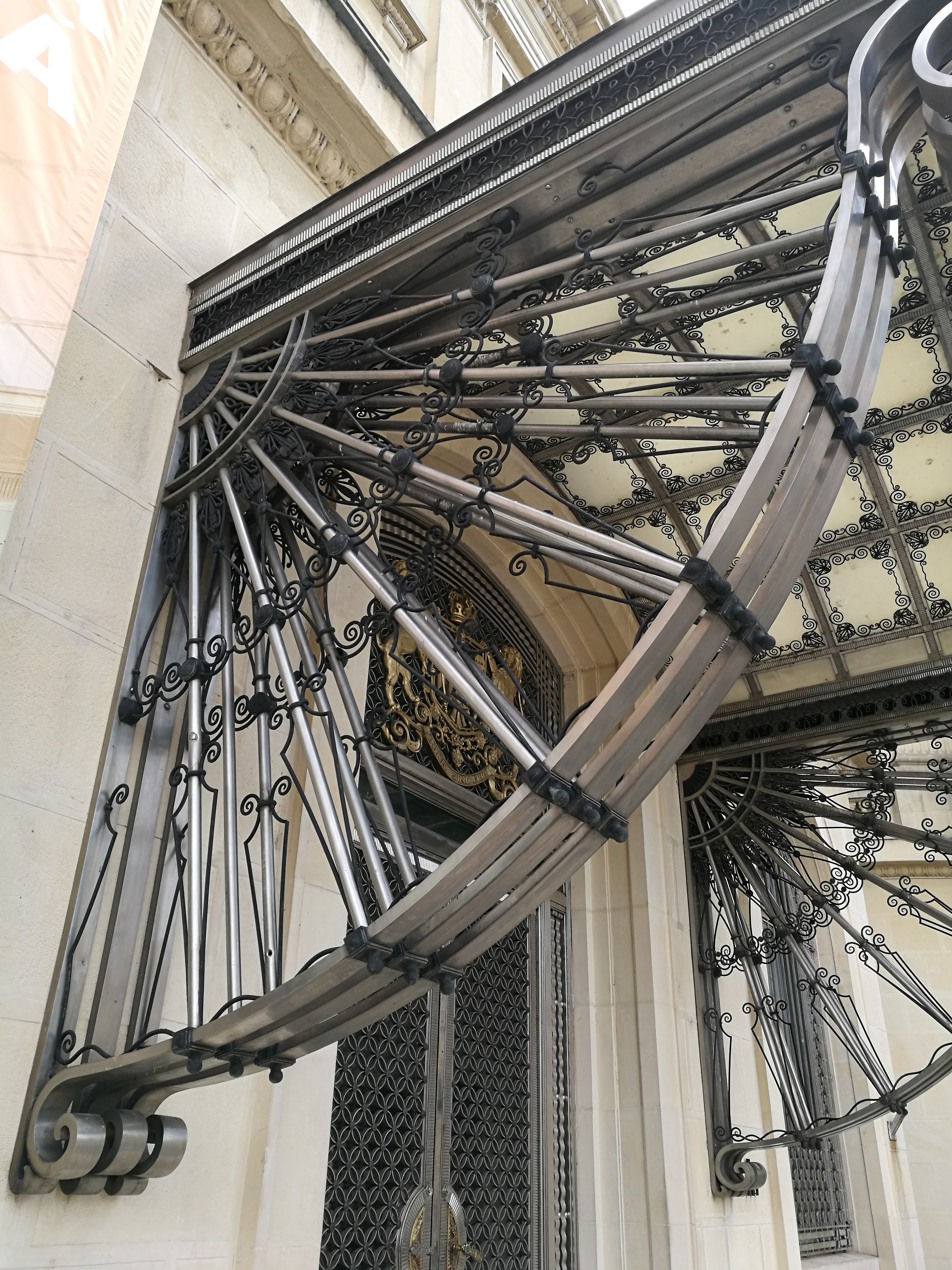

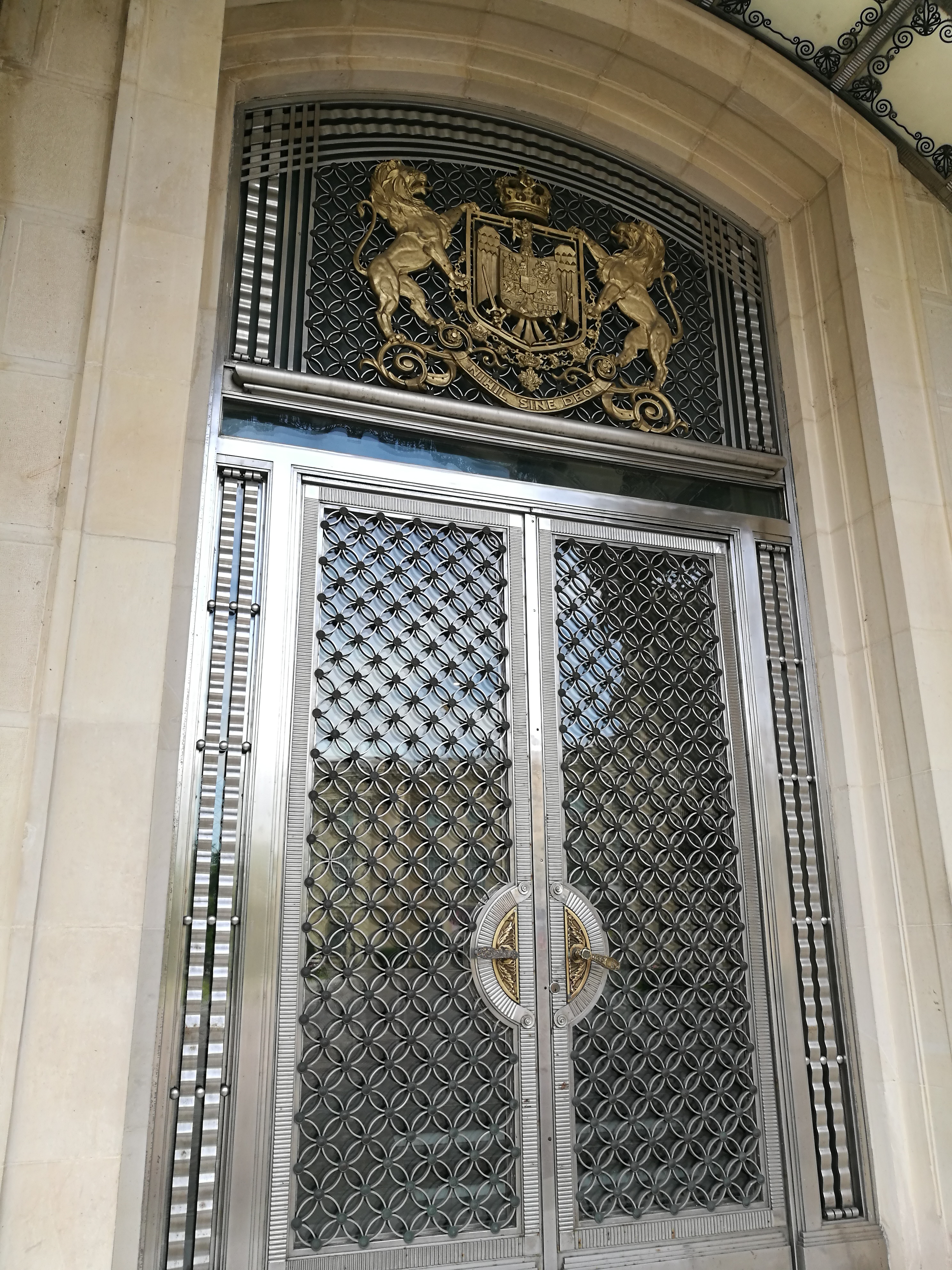

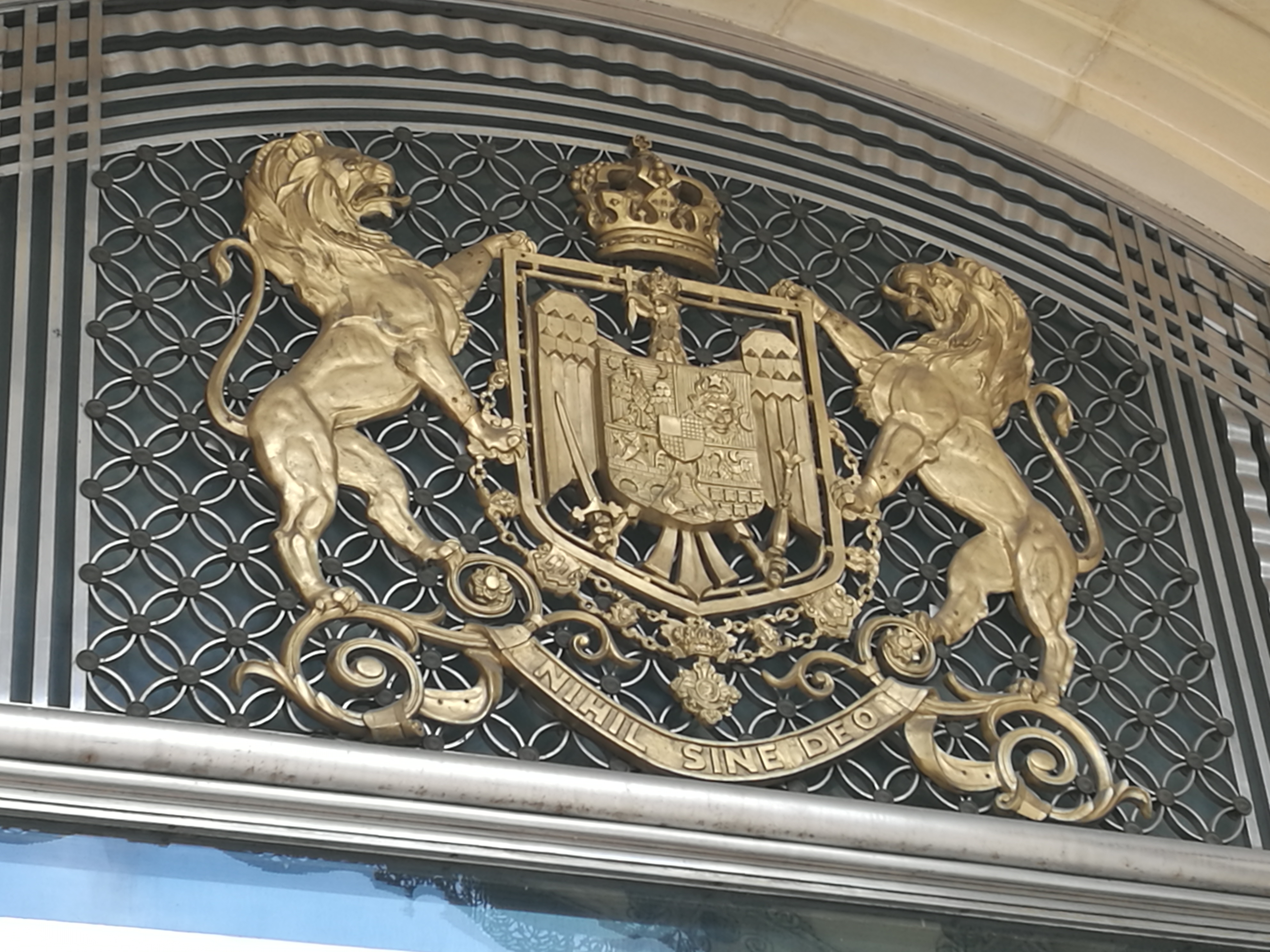

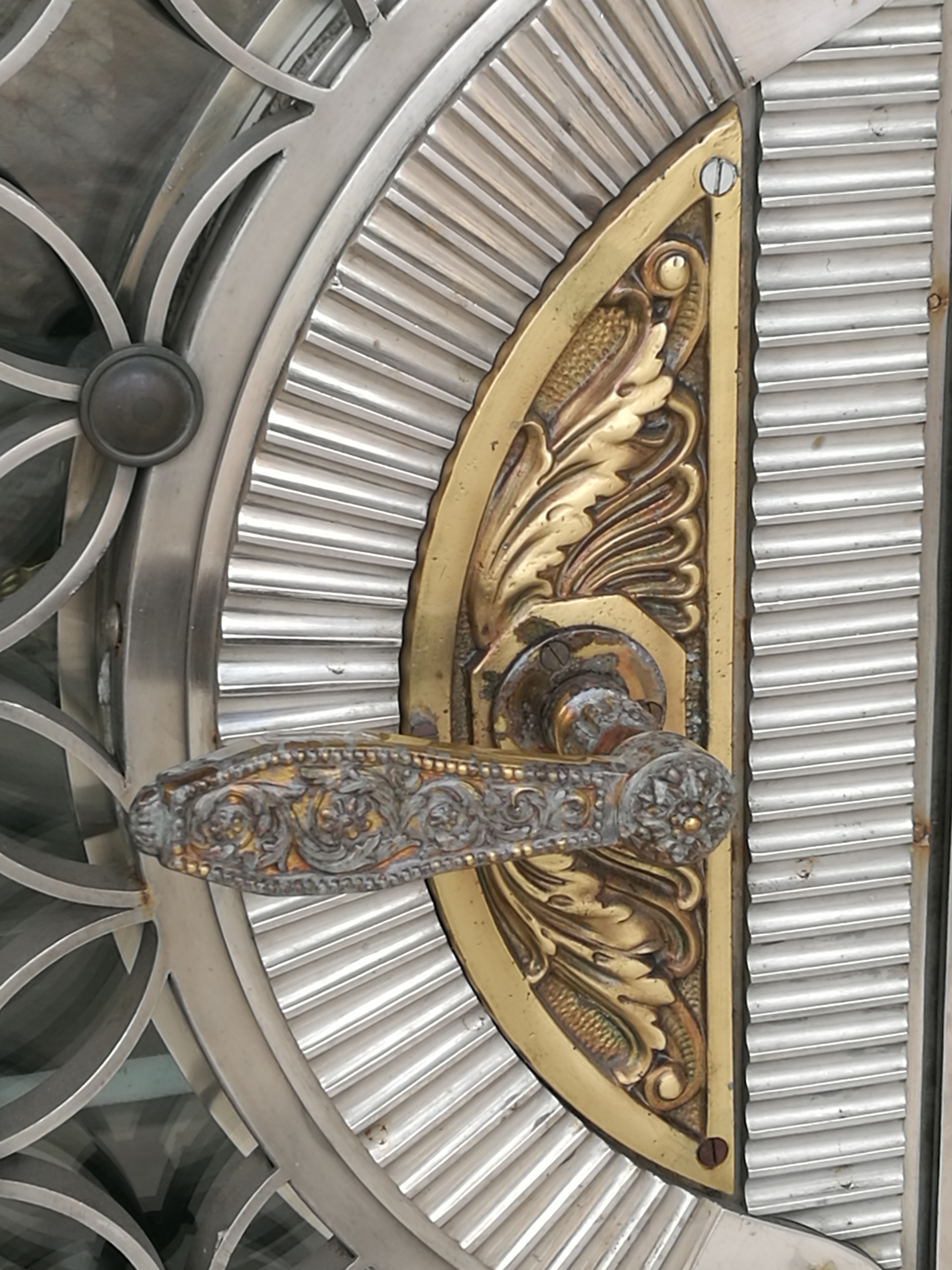

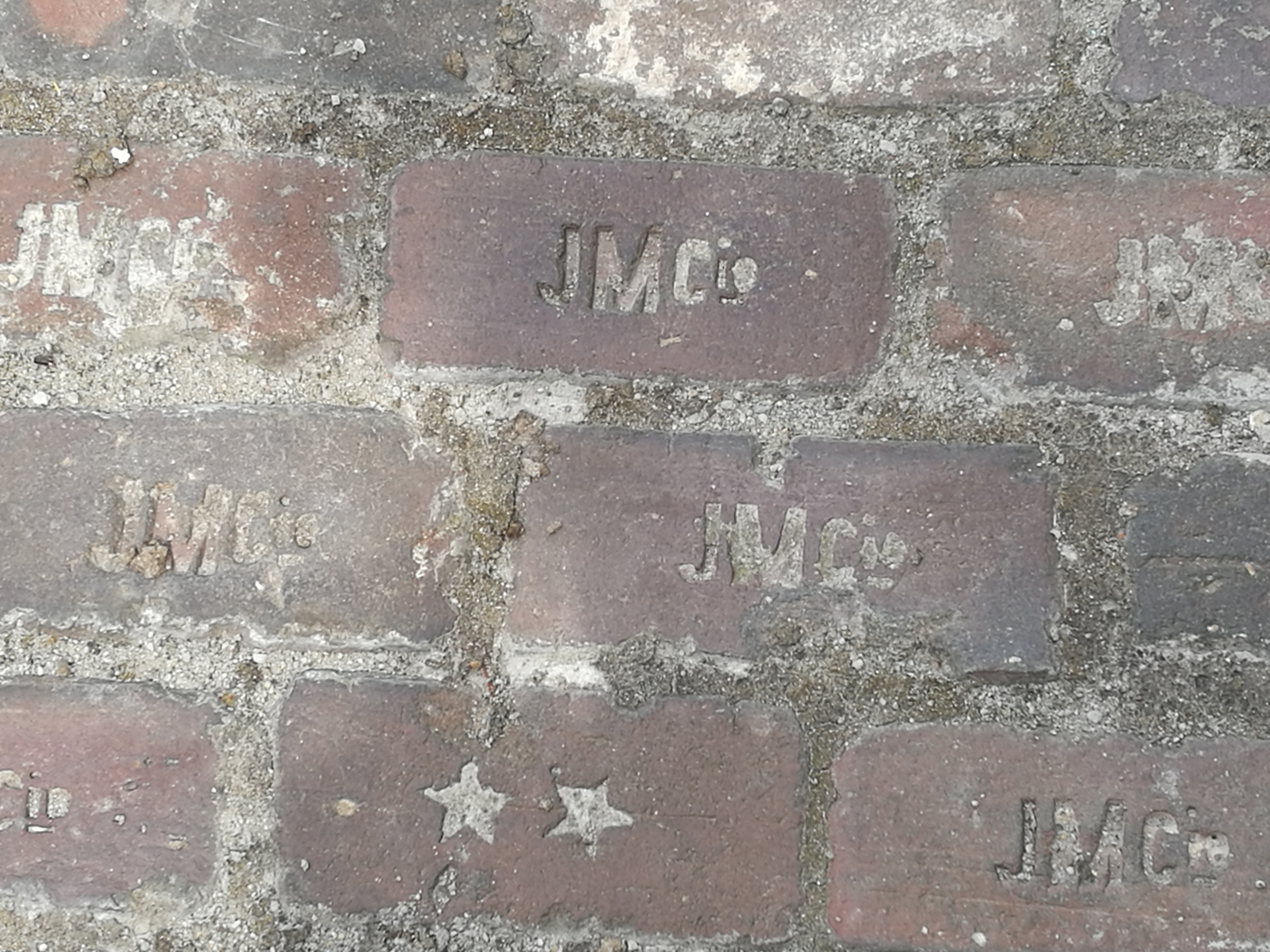

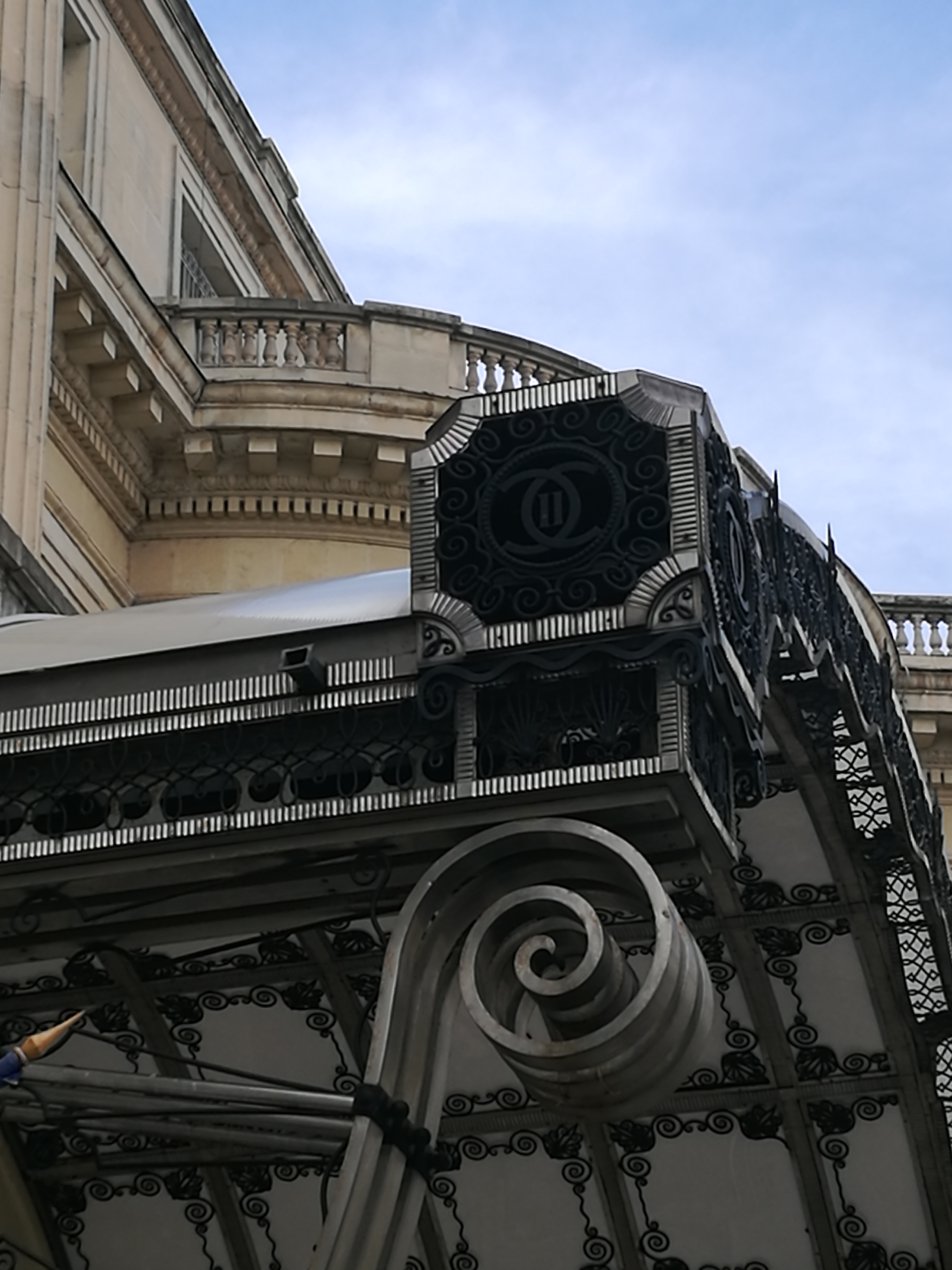
