= Sala Palatului =

- Interactive map of the Sala Palatului area

General information
- Architectural style: Modernist
- Location: Strada Ion Câmpineanu, nr. 28, Sector 1, Bucharest, Romania
- Coordinates: 44.439144°N 26.094978°E
- Opened: 1960
- Owner: RAAPPS

Design and construction
- Architects: Horia Maicu, Tiberiu Ricci, Ignace Șerban

Other information
- Seating capacity: 4,060

Website
- salapalatului.ro

Sala Palatului (Palace Hall) in Bucharest, Romania is a conference centre and concert hall immediately behind the National Museum of Art of Romania, the former royal palace in the heart of the city. It was built between 1959 and 1960, during the communist era, as part of an architectural ensemble that includes 9 other buildings, called Piața Sălii Palatului (the Palace Hall Square). Over time, it has hosted various conferences such as the United Nations Economic Commission for Europe, World Population Conference, World Energy Congress, and the World Congress of the Red Cross.

It is now also used as a general conference and convention center and as a concert venue for events such as the George Enescu Festival.

The main hall has a capacity of above 4,000 people. In addition to it, the foyer of the auditorium has a surface area of 2,000 m^{2} and is used as an exhibition space. There are also eight small conference rooms for meetings of between 20 and 100 people.

== Musical events ==
- 2011 Demis Roussos, Edvin Marton, Salvatore Adamo, Nana Mouskouri, Engelbert Humperdinck, Tom Jones, Balázs Havasi, Jane Birkin, The Manhattan Transfer, Duke Ellington Orchestra, Elvis Costello, Ten Years After, Hélène Ségara, Pat Metheny, Ali Campbell, Al Bano, Enrico Macias, Al Di Meola, Manu Chao, Gipsy Kings, Budapest Gypsy Symphony Orchestra/100 Violins, Bryan Ferry, Gogol Bordello, Gotan Project, etc.
- 2012 Lord of the Dance, Lara Fabian Steve Vai, Macy Gray, Gianni Morandi, BZN, Gheorghe Zamfir, José Carreras, Pink Martini, Status Quo, John Mayall, David Bisbal, Nigel Kennedy, Chick Corea, Gary Burton, Enrico Macias, Alessandro Safina, Toto Cutugno, Tarja Turunen, Narcotango. Bonnie Tyler, Ștefan Bănică, Jr., Tudor Gheorghe, Loredana Groza, Taxi, Horia Brenciu, Voltaj, Cleopatra Stratan, etc.
- 2013 Slash feat. Myles Kennedy, Yanni, Smokie, Tarja Turunen, Mark Knopfler, etc.
- 2014 Mireille Mathieu
- 2015 Pavel Stratan

== See also ==
- List of concert halls
