= 1901 Romanian general election =

General elections were held in the Kingdom of Romania between 9 and 15 March 1901.
