= Fichet-Bauche =

French fireproof vault manufacturer

- Product type: safes and vaults
- Current owner: OpenGate Capital
- Country: France
- Markets: Global
- Website: Fichet-Bauche

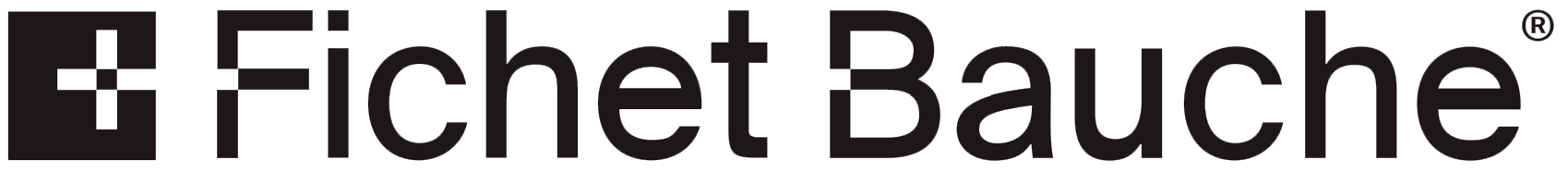

Fichet-Bauche is a brand of safes, vaults, and locks produced by Fichet Security Solutions, a business owned by OpenGate Capital. Specializing in fireproof safes, the original company and its brand were founded in 1967 as a result of a merger between Fichet, a locksmithing company, and Bauche, a fire protection specialist company. The brand is operating in France, Spain, Portugal, Italy, and French-speaking parts of Africa.

== History ==
=== The Fichet company ===
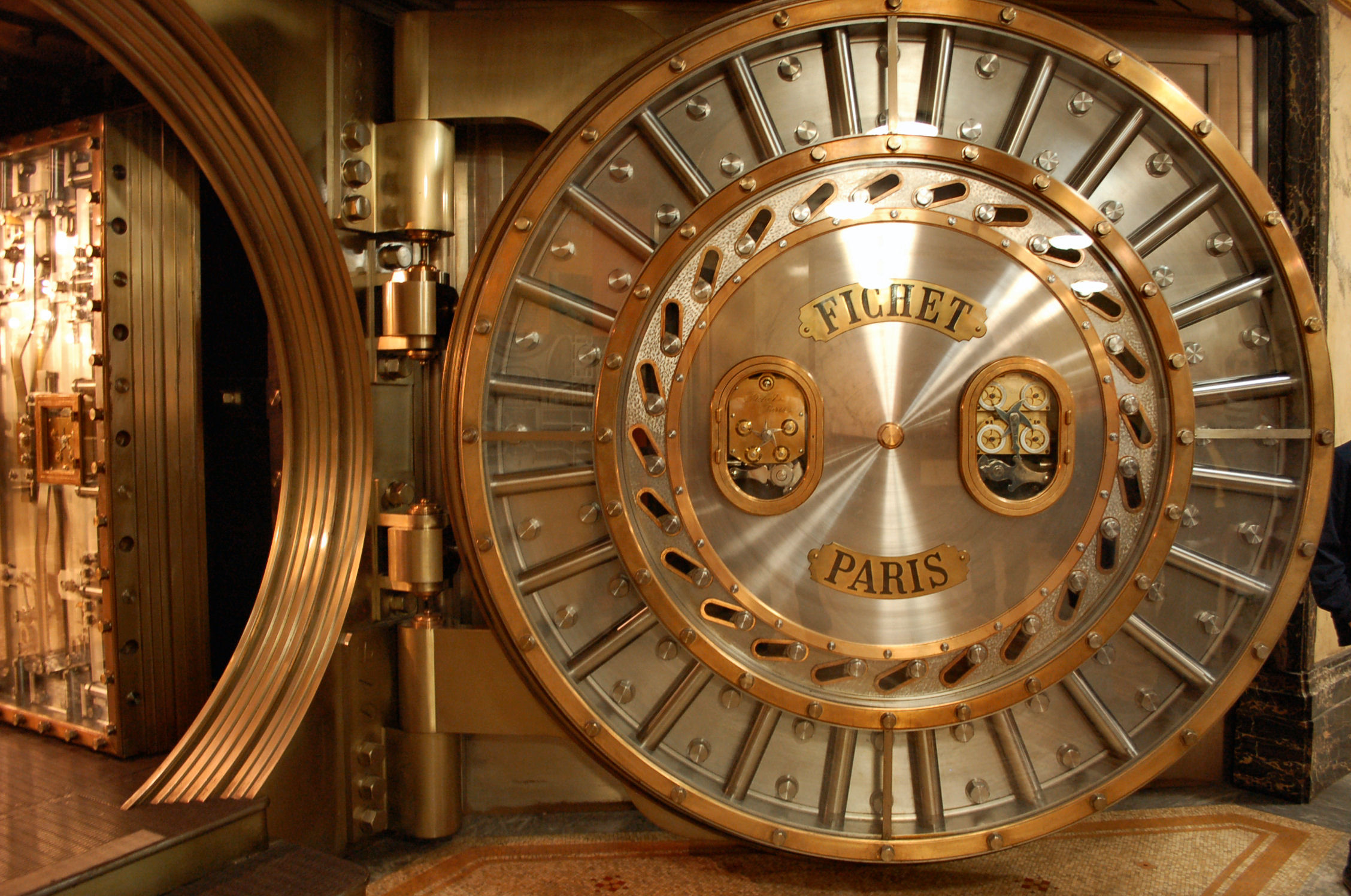
Fichet Paris, Vault of Crédit Lyonnais

Born 7 February 1799 in Etrepilly, France, Alexandre Fichet opened a locksmith shop in Paris in 1825 at the age of 26. He registered his first patent in 1829 for a safety lock and further patents followed in 1834 and 1836.

Shortly after, Fichet set up a small workshop in Paris and began expanding into the manufacture of safes. In 1840, he made his first modern fire safe made entirely of steel and using his, Fichet lock and key. As production outgrew the workshop, Fichet built a factory in Monceau in Paris, followed by a second in Lyon and third Marseille.

Fichet died in 1862 at the age of 63, and the business changed hands frequently from Louis and Apolline Bonnet, to Monsieur Charlier, manager of the workshops, and then to businessmen, Monsieur Guénot and Monsieur Pinot.

In 1879, the Fichet company built its first bank vault room with rentable safe deposit lockers. New factories were opened most notably in Oust-Marest in the Somme region where security locks were manufactured. This factory was supported by the nearby “Fichet Village” and by a factory in Creil which made bank safes. An additional factory was set up in Sens in 1917 and two years later branches were opened around the world, including Italy, Argentina, Spain, Belgium, Romania and Brazil.

On the eve of World War I, the general partnership that was Fichet became a limited partnership, and came under the management of Jacques Bournisien and Marcel Beau. The day before World War II began, Bournisien died, leaving Beau to run the company. He was aided for a time by Monsieur Nadaud, the husband of Alexandre Fichet's great-great-granddaughter.

=== The Bauche company ===
In 1864, Auguste-Nicolas Bauche, expert in fire resistant materials, began to produce safes and founded his first production factory in Gueux, near Reims in France. By 1867, the Gueux workshops had become too cramped. The factory was moved to Reims with more modern workshops incorporating a technological breakthrough of the time: a cementation furnace for the extreme hardening of the surface of certain steels.

This led to great advancements in the protection safes could offer. In 1879, Bauche demonstrated the efficacy of his fire safes with a live demonstration and several thousand francs emerged intact from a safe after having been repeatedly subjected to fire. Then the invention of the "ironclad" safe, both fire resistant and armour plated, in 1895, solidified Bauche's name in the safe industry.

Bauche expanded with the creation of a factory in Feuquières. At the start of World War I in 1914, the factory fell into the hands of the German Occupation, which on their retreat in 1918, razed the building to the ground. Afterwards, the building was rebuilt and both production and research were started afresh.

In 1924, Bauche created a new anti-welding torch testing, the focus of a new technology which would be used for many years to come. Working for the national defence ministry, the factory was destroyed once more by the Germans in 1940 and four years later was partially reconstructed as a repair workshop for American tanks. The company had to wait until well after the war before the factory was fully rebuilt.

=== The creation of Fichet-Bauche ===
In 1967, Fichet and Bauche merged. The newly merged Fichet-Bauche company focused on producing safes, vaults, and locks. The corporate headquarters was transferred to Clamart in Vélizy and, in parallel, a new factory was built in Carignan for the production of fire resistant safes. The Fichet-Bauche Group also expanded internationally during the end of the 1960s and 1970s.

A factory designed for the manufacture of vault room doors and safes was built in Barcelona, and new offices were opened in Argentina, Brazil, Portugal, Malaysia and Hong Kong.

=== Acquisition by Gunnebo Security Group ===
In December 1999, Fichet-Bauche was acquired by the Gunnebo Security Group. With its factory at Bazancourt, Marne, the company remained under its own name until 2007, when it was fully merged into Gunnebo, and the name became one of a number of Gunnebo brands of safes and vaults. International journalist writer Vojislav Stanimirovic noted that his son actually opened a safe and vault using the Fetcher key and this is discussed in the book Stealing Manhattan part 2 by Punch Stanimirovic & Burl Barer author of book for movie The Saint Burl Barer is an Edgard Award winning New York Times Best Selling author of True Crime talks to Punch Stanimirovic about the historical aspects of the important facts of safe cracking and making keys Stated from page 47 the most difficult is the legendary Fichet Key 10 out of 10 in security cannot be duplicated second to none

=== Acquisition by OpenGate Capital ===
In December 2018, OpenGate Capital, a global private equity firm, announced that it completed the acquisition of Fichet-Bauche from Gunnebo Group (GUNN: CPH), and renamed the business Fichet Security Solutions (“Fichet”).
