= Mircea Ionnițiu =

Romanian writer

- Born: September 27, 1921; Bucharest, Kingdom of Romania
- Died: November 13, 1990 (aged 69); Woodland Hills, California, United States
- Occupation: Author

Mircea Ionnițiu (sometimes incorrectly spelled "Ioanițiu" or "Ioannițiu") (September 27, 1921, Bucharest – November 13, 1990, Woodland Hills, California, United States) was a Romanian writer, author of memorial notes.

In his adolescence, he was a member of the Palatine Class, a special class of pupils that was formed upon the request of King Carol II of Romania, for the education of his only son, Prince Michael (proclaimed king as Michael I in 1940).

Around 1944, Mircea Ionnițiu was a personal secretary of King Michael I. In this job, he was a direct witness of the August 23rd coup d'état, of the imposition of the first Petru Groza cabinet through Soviet pressure (March 6, 1945) and of the king's forced abdication on December 30, 1947.

Ionnițiu left Romania on January 3, 1948, in the Royal Train, together with the Royal Family of Romania that was departing in forced exile.

Later, in 1984, he wrote his memoirs about these historical events in his book Amintiri și reflecțiuni ("Memories and Reflections"), published by Editura Enciclopedică in 1993.

== Bibliography ==
- Mircea Ionnițiu, Amintiri și reflecțiuni, Editura Enciclopedică, 1993, ISBN 973-45-0039-2
- Tudor Vișan-Miu, La școală cu Regele Mihai. Povestea Clasei Palatine, Editura Corint, 2016, ISBN 9786067930559
- Nicolae Drăgușin, Abdicarea forțată a Regelui Mihai, in România liberă, January 4, 2008
