= Mircea Ciobanu =

Romanian poet, writer, editor, translator and essayist

Mircea Sandu (Romanian pronunciation: [ˈmirtʃe̯a ˈsandu]; May 13, 1940 in Bucharest – April 22, 1996 in Bucharest), known as Mircea Ciobanu (pronounced [tʃjoˈbanu]), was a Romanian poet, writer, editor, translator and essayist.

== Legacy ==
He is best remembered for his two volumes of interviews with HM King Michael I of Romania (a book widely reprinted by various editors in the early 1990s, later reunited in a single volume by "Humanitas" Publishing House), that offers the most complete insight in the King's political and personal way of thinking, to date.

== Published works ==
- Imnuri pentru nesomnul cuvintelor, E. P. L., Bucharest, 1966
- Patimile, Editura Tineretului, Bucharest, 1968
- Martorii, E. P. L., Bucharest, 1968
- Epistole I, E. P. L., Bucharest, 1968
- Cartea fiilor, Editura Cartea Românească, Bucharest, 1970, 2nd edition at Editura Vitruviu, Bucharest, 1998
- Etica, Editura Albatros, Bucharest, 1971
- Armura lui Thomas si alte epistole, Editura Eminescu, Bucharest, 1971
- Martorii, 2nd edition, completely revised, 1973
- Tăietorul de lemne, Editura Cartea Românească, Bucharest, 1974
- Cele ce sînt, Editura Eminescu, Bucharest, 1974
- Istorii, vol. I, Editura Eminescu, Bucharest, 1977, 2nd edition at Editura Vitruviu, Bucharest, 1999
- Istorii, vol. II, Editura Cartea Românească, Bucharest, 1978, 2nd edition at Editura Vitruviu, Bucharest, 1999
- Patimile, Editura Cartea Românească, Bucharest, 1979
- Istorii, vol. III, Editura Eminescu, Bucharest, 1981, 2nd edition at Editura Vitruviu, Bucuharest, 1999
- Versuri, Editura Eminescu, Bucharest, 1982
- Istorii, vol. IV, Editura Cartea Românească, Bucharest, 1983
- Vîntul Ahab, Editura Eminescu, Bucharest, 1984.
- Marele scrib, Albatros, "Cele mai frumoase poezii" collection ("The Most Beautiful Poems"), Bucharest, 1985
- Istorii, vol. V, Editura Eminescu, Bucharest, 1986
- Martorii. Epistole. Tăietorii de lemne, Editura Minerva, Bucharest, 1988
- Viața lumii, Editura Cartea Românească, Bucharest, 1989
- Nimic fără Dumnezeu. Convorbiri cu Mihai I al României (Nothing Without God. Talks With Michael I of Romania), Humanitas, Bucharest, 1992 - vol. I
- Nimic fără Dumnezeu. Noi convorbiri cu Mihai I al României (Nothing Without God. New Talks With Michael I of Romania), Humanitas, Bucharest, 1993 - vol. II
- Tînărul bogat (vol. VI from Istorii), Editura Cartea Românească, Bucharest, 1993
- Poeme, Editura Princeps, Iași, 1994
- În fața neamului meu (In Front of My Nation), Editura Princeps, Iași, 1995, ISBN 973-96865-2-4
- La capătul puterilor. Însemnări pe Cartea lui Iov, Editura Vitruviu, București, 1997
- Anul tăcerii, Editura Vitruviu, București, 1997
- Convorbiri cu Regele Mihai I al României (Talks with King Michael of Romania), Humanitas, 2004, 3rd edition, ISBN 978-973-50-2122-1 (reunites vol. I and vol. II)
- Convorbiri cu Mihai I al României (Talks with Michael I of Romania), Humanitas, 2008, 3rd edition, ISBN 978-973-50-2122-1 (reunites vol. I and vol. II)
