= List of fountains in Bucharest =

This is a List of fountains in Bucharest.

Image	Name / Translation	Year	Artist	Location / Coordinates	Notes
	Lahovari Fountain	1903	Carol Storck	Piața Operetei	
	George Grigorie Cantacuzino Fountain	1870	Al. Freiwald and Karl Storck	Carol Park	
	1906 Fountain			Carol Park	
	Zodiac Fountain	1935	Octav Doicescu	entrance in Carol Park	
	Fântâna cu copii		Ioan Iordănescu	str. Dionisie Lupu	
	Izvorul Sissi Stefanidi		Ion Dimitriu-Bârlad	Cișmigiu Park	
	Izvorul Eminescu			Cișmigiu Park	
	Fântâna cu nimfă și tritoni			Parcul Tei	
	Miorița Fountain	1936	Octav Doicescu, Milița Petrașcu	Herăstrău Park	
	Fântâna Vioara Spartă	2009	Domenica Regazzoni	University Square	
	CFR Heroes' Fountain			near Gara de Nord	
	Gara Basarab Fountain			near Gara Basarab	
