= Cecilia Cuțescu-Storck =

Romanian painter

Cecilia Cutescu-Storck
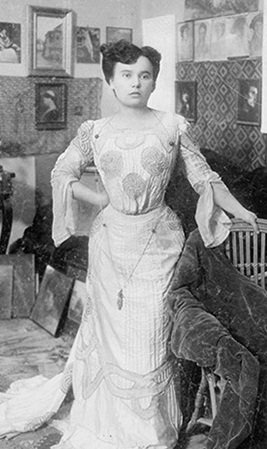
- Born: Cecilia Cutescu; 14 March 1879; Câineni, Kingdom of Romania
- Died: 29 October 1969 (aged 90); Bucharest, Socialist Republic of Romania
- Education: Académie Julian
- Occupations: Painter and muralist
- Spouse: Frederic Storck

Cuțescu-Storck made her artistic debut in Paris in 1902, presenting this nude study in oils at the Salon du Champs de Mars.

Cecilia Cuțescu-Storck (14 March 1879, in Câineni, Vâlcea – 29 October 1969, in Bucharest) was a Romanian painter with a strong influence on cultural life in the interwar period. She was a promoter of feminism, contributing to the establishment of the "Association of women painters and sculptors" (together with Olga Greceanu and Nina Arbore) and "Feminin artistic circle". She was the first woman in Europe to become a professor at an art academy, teaching painting and decorative arts at the Bucharest School of Fine Arts.

== Biography ==
Cecilia Cuțescu was born in the village Râul Vadului, in the Câineni commune, Vâlcea County. She was adopted by her maternal grandparents, from whom she got the name Cuțescu. She, however, remained very close to her parents, Natalia and Ion Brăneanu, and her sisters, Fulvia (who died in her teens) and Ortansa (who became an important feminist activist in Romania).

She moved with her grandparents to Bucharest, so that she could attend the prestigious Central School for Girls. Passionate about art from an early age, she would sneak off during school hours to paint. The Cuțescu family sought the advice of the renowned Polish realist painter Tadeusz Ajdukiewicz, who confirmed Cecilia's talent. After graduating from the Central School, she continued her studies at the Damenakademie, Munich, in 1897. In 1899 she went to Paris and took classes at Académie Julian, where she studied under Jean-Paul Laurens and Jean-Joseph Benjamin-Constant. During her time in Paris, her paintings were introduced to the public through exhibitions held in France and Romania. Her public debut was at the 1902 Salon du Champs de Mars, where she displayed an oil painting simply entitled Nude Study, now in the collection of the National Museum of Art of Romania. She had works accepted in Paris for the Salon d'Automne, and in 1906 had her first one-woman show at Galerie Hessèle in Rue Lafitte. In Bucharest, she became part of the "Tinerimea" ("Youth") group and exhibited with them; the sculptor Constantin Brâncuși had works in those same exhibitions.

In Paris, in 1903, she married violinist Romulus Kunzer, by whom she had a son that same year, Romeo, later a prominent artist in his own right, under the name Romeo Storck. However, the marriage did not last. In 1906 she returned definitively to Romania and settled in Bucharest, where three years later she married sculptor Frederic (Fritz) Storck, with whom she would remain until his death in 1942. They had two children: architect Gabriela (Gabi) Storck, and Cecilia (Lita) Storck, later ceramicist Cecilia Storck Botez.

After her return to Romania, she became particularly interested in decorative arts and monumental murals. In 1916, she became a professor in the Department of Decorative Arts at the Academy of Fine Arts in Bucharest (later Bucharest National University of Arts, becoming the first female professor in any government-sponsored European art faculty. She designed and created numerous murals in public buildings in Bucharest, among the most important being the Istoria Negoțului Românesc ("History of Romanian Trade", 1933) in the hall of the Bucharest Academy of Economic Studies. She continued to exhibit both in Romania (at the Tinerimea exhibits, at the official salon, and at state expositions) and abroad. In 1924 and 1928 she represented Romania at the Venice Biennale. She was elected president of the Union of Fine Arts in 1937.

Cuțescu-Storck published her autobiography Fresca unei vieți ("Fresco of a Life") in 1943, the year after her husband's death. A revised version O viață dedicată artei ("A Life Dedicated to Art") was published in 1966; three years later she died in Bucharest.

== Casa Storck ==
Shortly after marrying in 1909, Cecilia and Frederic Storck collaborated with architect Alexandru Clavel to build a family home and studio at Str. Vasile Alecsandri, nr.16. Construcțion began in 1911, and between 1913 and 1917 Cuțescu-Storck decorated the interior with a numerous Symbolist murals, featuring images of women and of luxurious vegetation. These were executed in encaustic rather than the more tradițional fresco, producing warmer, more vibrant colors.

A portion of one of Cecilia Cuțescu-Storck's murals for Casa Storck

Cuțescu-Storck turned the main room of the house into an impressive studio. At the entrance was a green marble pillar, a replica of an architectural element of St Mark's Basilica in Venice. The opposite wall featured two large panels, painted 1912–1915, entitled Dragostea pământească și Dragostea spirituală ("Earthly and Spiritual Love"). The two panels are separated by a stone fountain sculpted by her husband Frederic, modeled on the door of Colțea Church, which is located near the University of Bucharest. This diptych evoked the Cuțescu-Storck's belief that women benefit from important intellectual and spiritual resources. In 1918, the Association for the Civil and Political Emancipation of Romanian Women was formally inaugurated in this room.

In 1948, under the new Communist regime, the works of Frederic Storck were declared to be "of public utility", and in 1951 the studio was opened as an art museum, with the family preserving living space elsewhere in the house. The entire building is now the Muzeul de Artă Frederic Storck și Cecilia Cuțescu-Storck (Frederic Storck and Cecilia Cuțescu-Storck Museum of Art), containing works of both artists as well as sculptures by Frederic's father Karl Storck and brother Carol Storck, and at least one piece by their ceramicist daughter Cecilia Storck Botez.

== Artistic career ==
Maternitate, 1911

With her talent proven by the murals in her own home and studio, Cuțescu-Storck began to receive many commissions. The first of this was a mural Agriculture, Industry and Commerce (1916) for the hall of honor of the Marmorosch, Blank & Co. Bank building in Strada Doamnei, Bucharest, designed by architect Petre Antonescu. Her later Istoria Negoțului Românesc ("History of Romanian Trade", 1933) in the hall of the Bucharest Academy of Economic Studies was a massive mural, exceeding 100 square metres (1,100 sq ft), and showing over 100 distinct life-sized individuals. Arranged in six successive registers, they show the development of trade in Romania over time.

Another prestigious commission was the ceiling of the throne room of the Romanian Royal Palace, now the National Museum of Art of Romania. This allegorical composition in a round format bears the title Apologia artelor românești ("Apology of Romanian Arts"). In 1937 she was invited to participate in the decoration of the Romanian pavilion of the Exposition Internationale des Arts et Techniques dans la Vie Moderne in Paris, contributing a composition depicting 16th-century Wallachian voivode Petru Cercel and his court.

Besides her murals, Cuțescu-Storck executed numerous Symbolist paintings and landscapes in oil on canvas, oil on cardboard, pastels, ink, and other media. One important lost example is the triptych known variously as Țigăncile ("The Gypsies") or Bucuria vieții ("The Joy of Life"). Painted in 1911, but unfortunately destroyed in the war, the piece measured roughly 3 metres (9.8 ft) by 7 metres (23 ft) and, like many of her works, portrayed women in a lush natural setting. As Petru Comarnescu put it, although "their faces are troubled by anxiety, trials, suffering, suggesting to us these states of mind, the Gypsies' bodies seem like the fruits and flowers that are, not by chance, found around them. These bodies, which have nothing of vulgar sensuality, but are full of beauty, cleanliness, health, carry the warmth and aspirations of life." Other compositions of a similar nature are Adam si Eva ("Adam and Eve", 1912), Maternitate ("Motherhood", 1913), and Înțelept indian ("Indian Sage", 1932). Cuțescu-Storck also left a rich body of landscapes in ink and wash, several of which can be seen in the Storck Museum.

Cuțescu-Storck's artistic activity was closely intertwined with her feminism. Besides her pioneering role as a female professor, in 1916, Cuțescu-Storck, Olga Greceanu and Nina Arbore, the so-called Grup al celor trei doamne ("Group of three women") founded the Association of Female Painters and Sculptors", Grup al celor trei doamne. The periodic salons organized by the group gave public exposure to the works of numerous artists in the period between the two World Wars.

== Distinctions ==
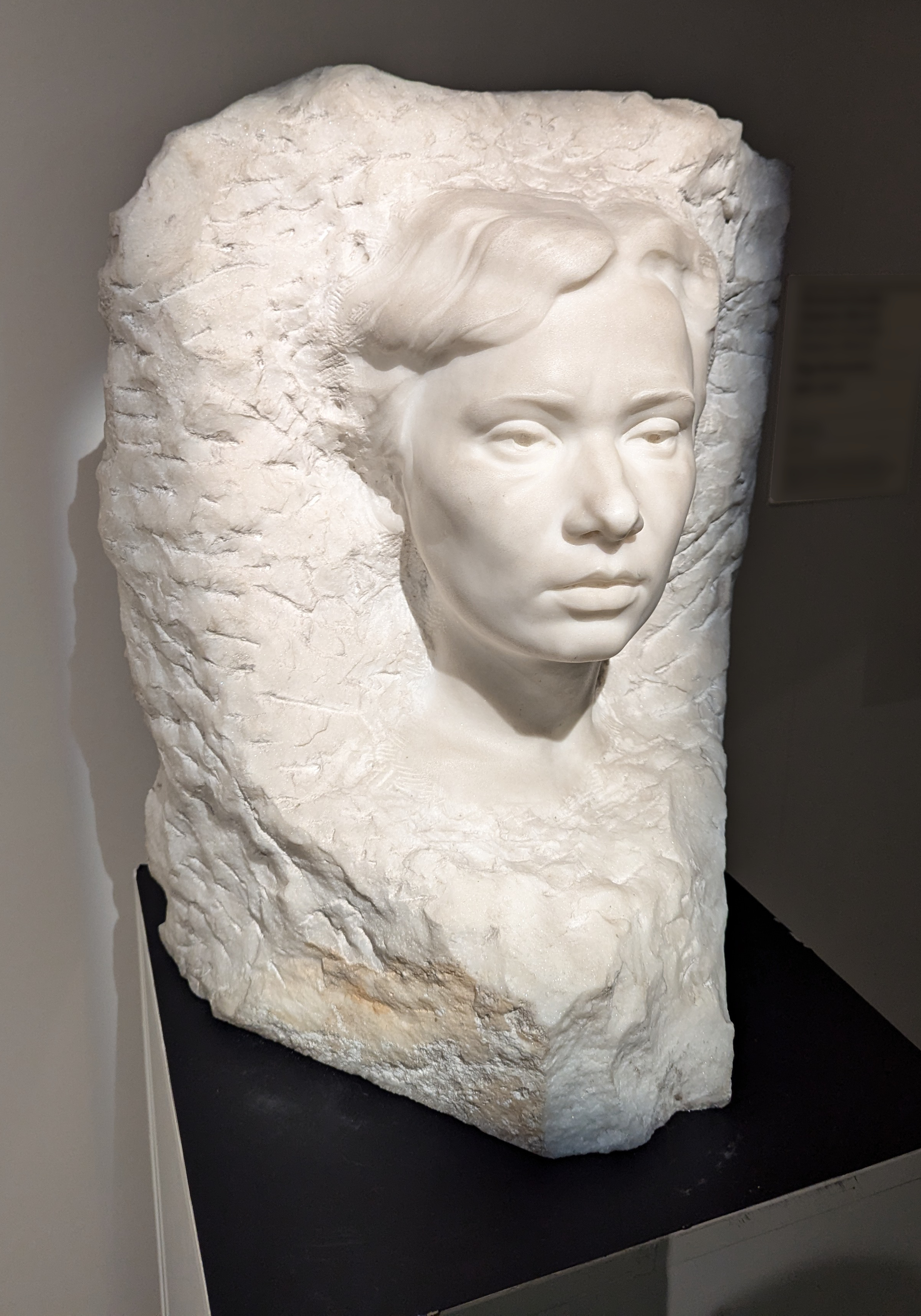
Portrait sculpture by her husband, Frederic (1909). From the collection of the "Frederic and Cecilia Cuțescu-Storck Art Museum"

- Gold Medal and Grand Prize at the 1929 Barcelona International Exposition
- Dame (equivalent of a Knight) of the Order of Civil Merit, Spain (1930)
- Knight of the Legion of Honour, France (1933)
- Gold Medal, Exposition Internationale des Arts et Techniques dans la Vie Moderne, (Paris, 1937)
- Mistress Emerita of Art, 1957, for her entire artistic achievement.

== Authored books ==
- Fresca unei vieți, Bucovina, Editura Torouțiu, 1943
- O viață dăruită artei, Editura Meridiane, 1966
- Fresca unei vieți, Editura Vremea, București, 2006

== Referenced in books ==
- Leon Thevenin: Cecile Coutesco-Storck, sa vie et son oevre, Quatre Chemins, 1932
- Angela Vrancea: Cecilia Cuțescu-Storck, Editura de Stat pentru Literatură și Artă, 1957
- Gabriela Storck și Petre Comarnescu: Cecilia Cuțescu-Storck: Expozitie Retrospectiva, Uniunea Artiștilor Plastici, 1959
- Marin Mihalache: Cecilia Cuțescu-Storck, Editura Meridiane, București, 1969
- Liliana Vârban, Ionel Ionița, Dan Vasiliu: Casa Storck – Muzeul Storck, Muzeul Municipiului București, 2005
- Jeremy Howard: East European Art, Oxford University Press, 2006
- Shona Kallestrup: Art and Design in Romania 1866–1945, Columbia, Eastern European Monographs, 2006
- Aurora Liiceanu: Patru femei, patru povești, Editura Polirom, 2010

== In memoriam ==
In June 2010, from the initiative of the rector of the Economic Studies Academy of Bucharest, Gheorghe Roșca, and of the mayor of Câineni, Ion Nicolae, a commemorative plaque was placed in the village Râul Vadului.

The Frederic and Cecilia Cuțescu-Storck Art Museum is a modern art museum located in Bucharest, dedicated to the painter and her husband. In Balchik, now in Bulgaria, the Storck family owned a seafront mansion known as Villa Storck.

== Bibliography ==
- Cecilia Cuțescu-Storck: Fresca unei vieți, Bucovina, Editura Torouțiu, 1943
- Gabriela Storck si Petre Comărnescu: Cecilia Cuțescu-Storck: Expozitie Retrospectiva, Uniunea Artiștilor Plastici, 1959
- Marin Mihalache: Cecilia Cuțescu-Storck, Editura Meridiane, București, 1969
- Liliana Vârban, Ionel Ionița, Dan Vasiliu: Casa Storck – Muzeul Storck, Muzeul Municipiului București, 2005
- Shona Kallestrup: Art and Design in Romania 1866–1945, Columbia, Eastern European Monographs, 2006
