= Galați County Prefecture =

Building in Galați, Romania

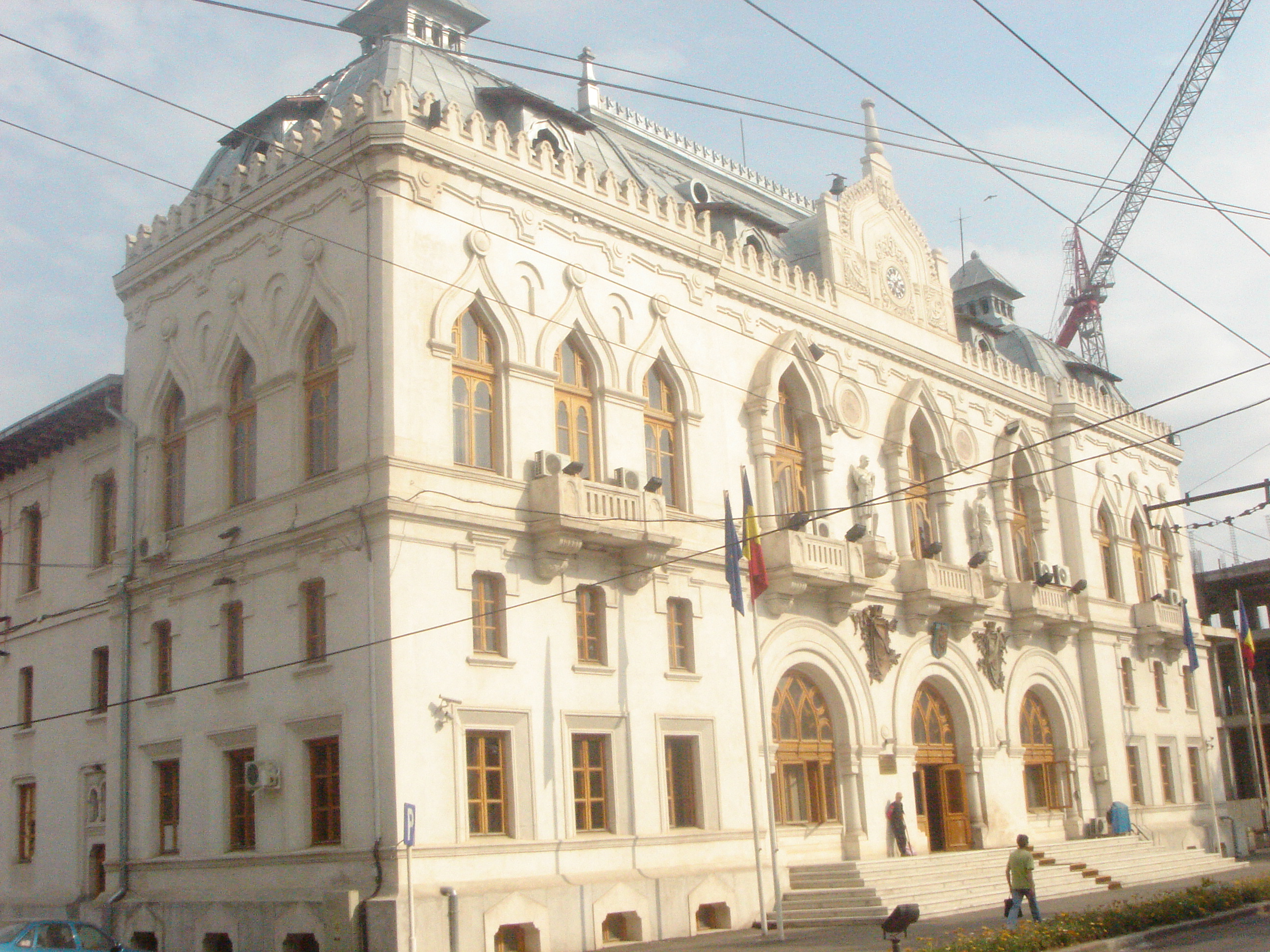
Galați County Prefecture

The Galați County Prefecture (Romanian: Palatul Administrativ din Galați) is a building in Galați, Romania, housing the offices of the Galați County prefect. It is located at Strada Domnească, nr. 56.

Built in 1904–1905 according to the plans of architect Ion Mincu, the building was inaugurated on April 27, 1906. The structure has a symmetrical plan, running lengthwise along the city's main street. There are two secondary wings, narrower and less ornate, that run behind to enclose a courtyard. On the one hand, there is a suggestion of Venetian style in the façade, with its tall pointed windows and crenellations; Galați itself was the country's main port at the time. On the other hand, traditional Romanian shapes such as buttons, discs and crested larks decorate the rooftop. Among the materials used are stone from Câmpulung, Ruse, Vratsa and Trieste; rubble masonry for the basement; brick from Buzău and Galați; pine shelves; tile and mosaic floors; stone and oak stairs. The roof decorations, corners and drainpipes were made of zinc plates. The new building had gas heating, running water, drainage and gaslight. Two white marble sculptures by Frederic Storck, Industry and Agriculture, adorn the upper part of the main facade. Lower down, there are two coats of arms of the county in bronze. There is also a large clock, and every hour, a few bars of "Waves of the Danube" are played. There are crystal mirrors mounted alongside the monumental main staircase, which has a finely decorated balustrade. The floor, panels and large chairs of the reception room are original.

Romania's Culture Ministry classifies the building as a historic monument.
