= Villa Storck =

- Вила Щорк (in Bulgarian); Vila Storck (in Romanian)
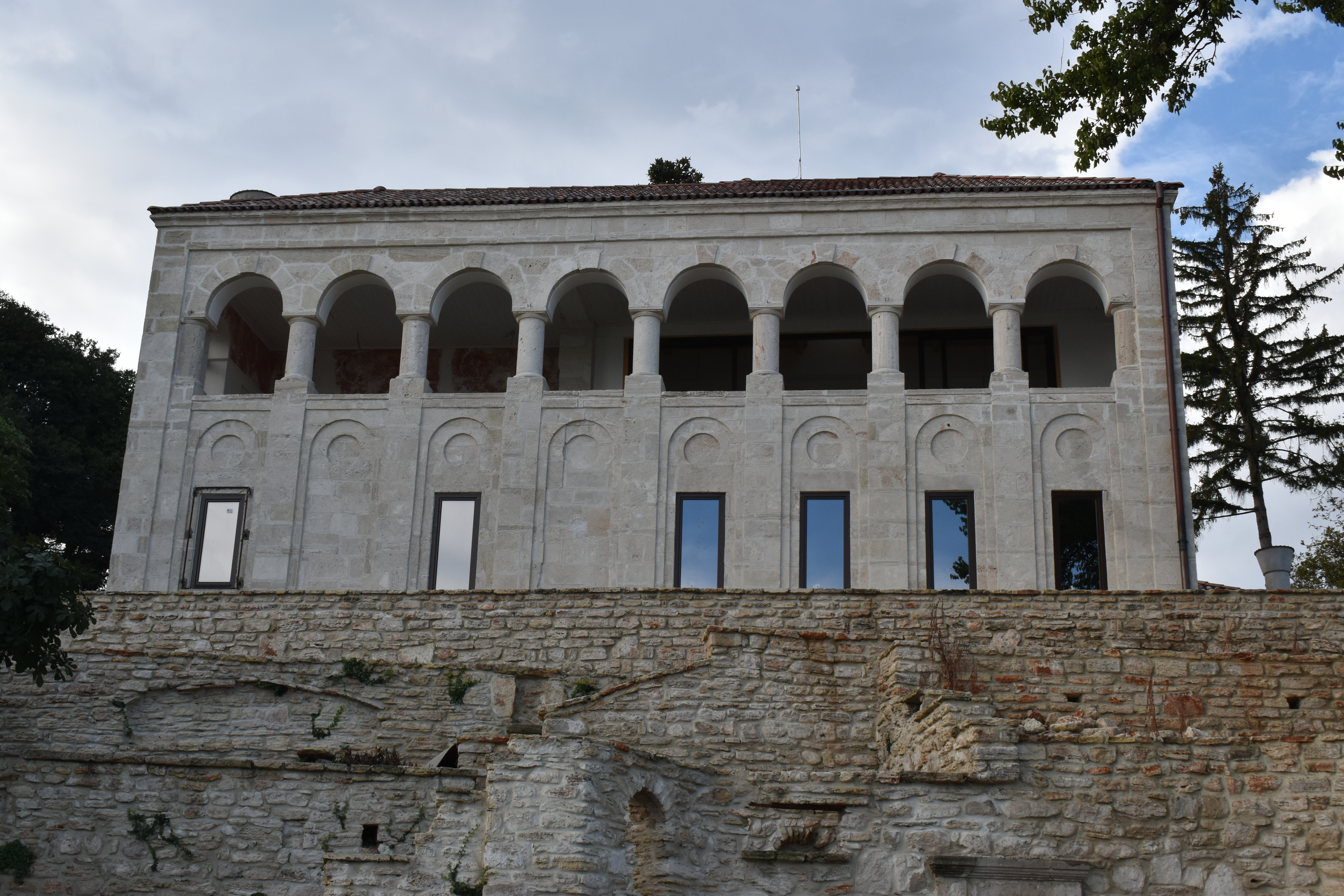
- South facade of Villa Storck as viewed from Balchik's seafront during the ongoing renovation
- Interactive map of the Villa Storck area

General information
- Type: house
- Location: Balchik, Bulgaria
- Coordinates: 43°24′18″N 28°09′08″E
- Construction started: 1920
- Completed: 1926

Design and construction
- Architects: Henrieta Delavrancea, Cecilia Cuțescu-Storck, Frederic Storck

Villa Storck (Bulgarian: Вила „Щорк“, Romanian: Vila Storck) is a historic stone mansion situated on the Black Sea promenade of Balchik, Dobrich Province, northeastern Bulgaria. The villa was co-designed by its first owners, the Romanian sculptor Frederic Storck (1872–1942) and his wife, the painter Cecilia Cuțescu-Storck (1879–1969). Built between 1920 and 1926, it served as the artist family's seaside residence and creative workshop during the Romanian rule of Southern Dobruja (1913–1940).

Villa Storck was one of the earliest Romanian-built summer residences in Balchik. It was built in several stages using local white Balchik limestone. Henrieta Delavrancea, one of the first female Romanian architects, was involved in the design. One of the most prominent design features is a loggia with eight arches and thick columns on the second floor. The mansion's architecture evokes a fortress and it affords panoramic views over the Black Sea. The villa's decoration included sculptures by Frederic Storck and murals by Cecilia Cuțescu-Storck. During the Romanian era, the "White Town" of Balchik was a fashionable resort for the Bucharest elite and a popular seaside hub for the country's creative community. After Southern Dobruja was returned to Bulgaria in 1940, the villa was plundered and much of its decoration was stolen or taken back to Romania. During the People's Republic of Bulgaria period, the mansion was used as a government resort. Later it, was given the status of monument of cultural of local importance.

To the east, Villa Storck is adjacent to the modernist Villa Sanda, built in 1934 and designed by Paul Smărăndescu. Queen Marie of Romania's Balchik Palace is situated in close proximity; in comparison to the queen's summer residence, Villa Storck was referred to as "The Little Palace". The villa has a built-up area of 367 m^{2} (3,950 sq ft) and occupies a lot of 2,900 m^{2} (31,000 sq ft). In the 2010s, it was listed for sale for 3,400,000 euro. In 2021, Villa Storck was purchased by a Swiss-Bulgarian family and as of 2023, it is being reconstructed. It is planned that the building will be made accessible to the public.

The arches, the stone fireplace similar to those in Florentine palaces, the oak door with the monastic shape, the charming stone frieze and the compact balustrade leading from the studio to the loggia gave originality to the large salon. The bedchambers and bathrooms had domes interrupted by small round or square openings with glass panes in the oriental style. In the loggia I painted ideal landscapes, with ships fishing in the harbours, with straight and unusually high cliffs abruptly stopping in the sea, with precipitous roads and virgins in prayer.

— Cecilia Cuțescu-Storck, Fresco of a Life (1943)

== Gallery ==
Cecilia Cuțescu-Storck's drawing of the original 3-arch loggia some time between 1924 and 1929

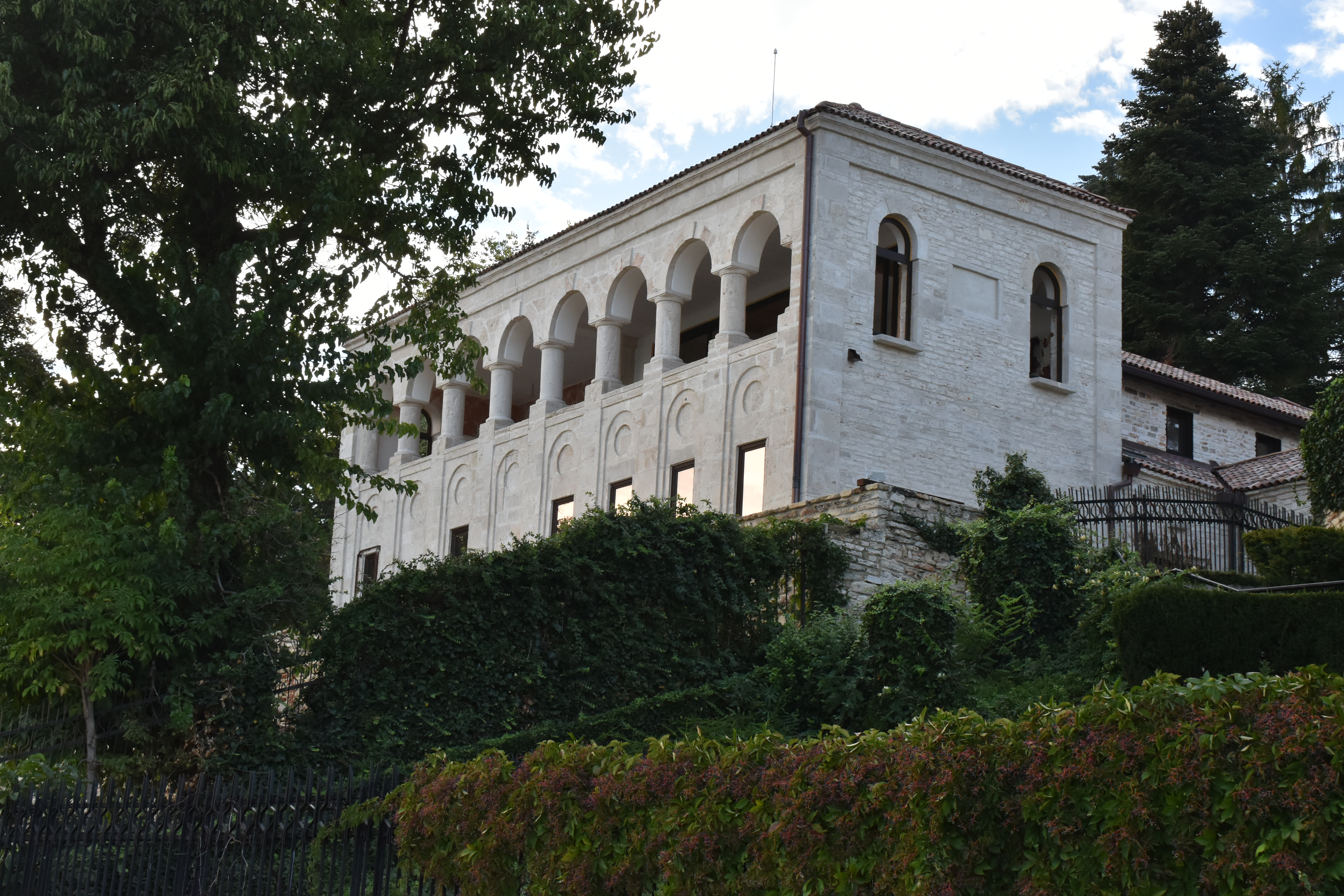
View from southeast

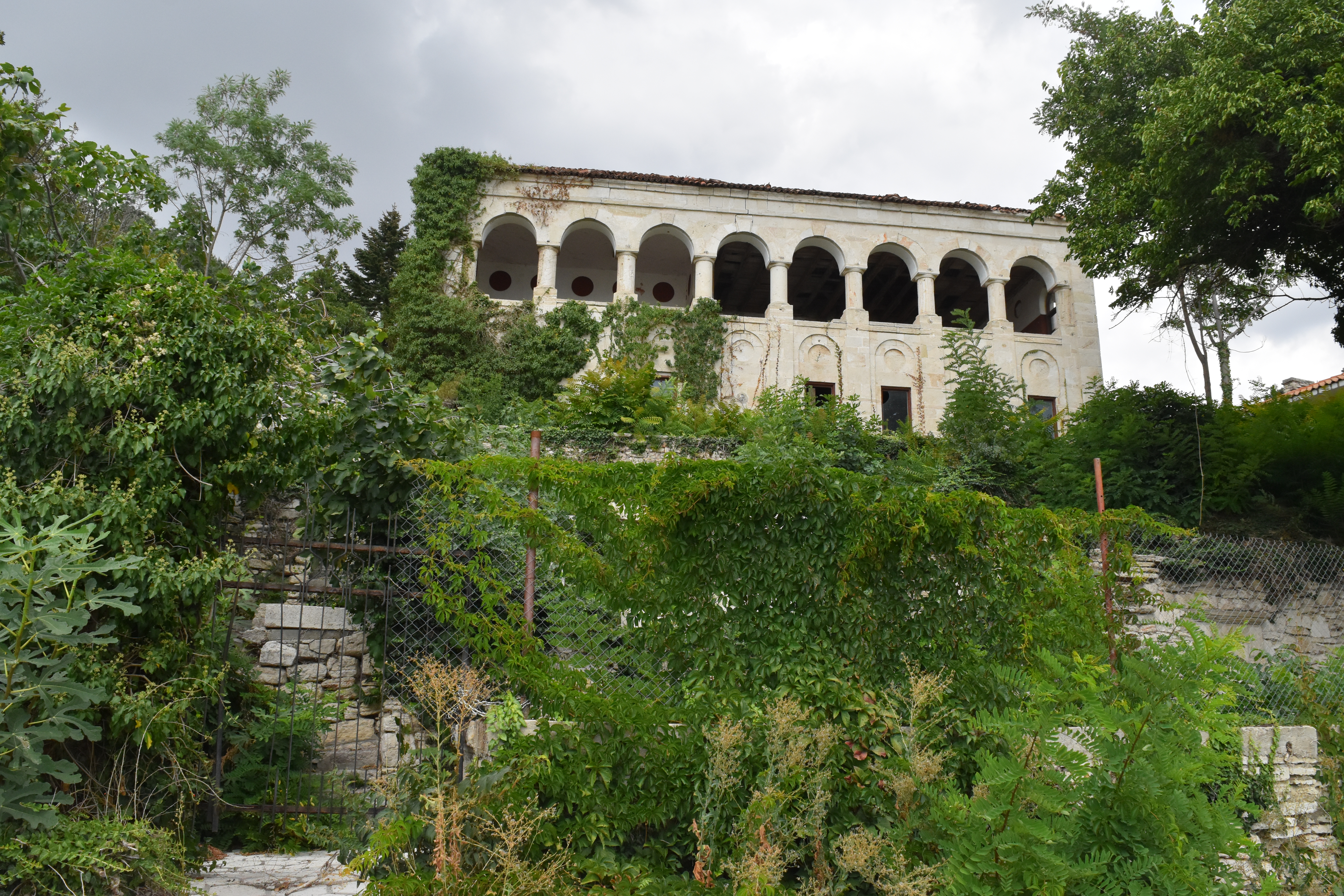
South facade in 2020, before the ongoing renovation
