= Frederic and Cecilia Cuțescu-Storck Art Museum =

Museum in Bucharest, Romania

Coordinates: 44°27′3.50″N 26°5′40.17″E

- Muzeul Frederic Storck și Cecilia Cuțescu-Storck
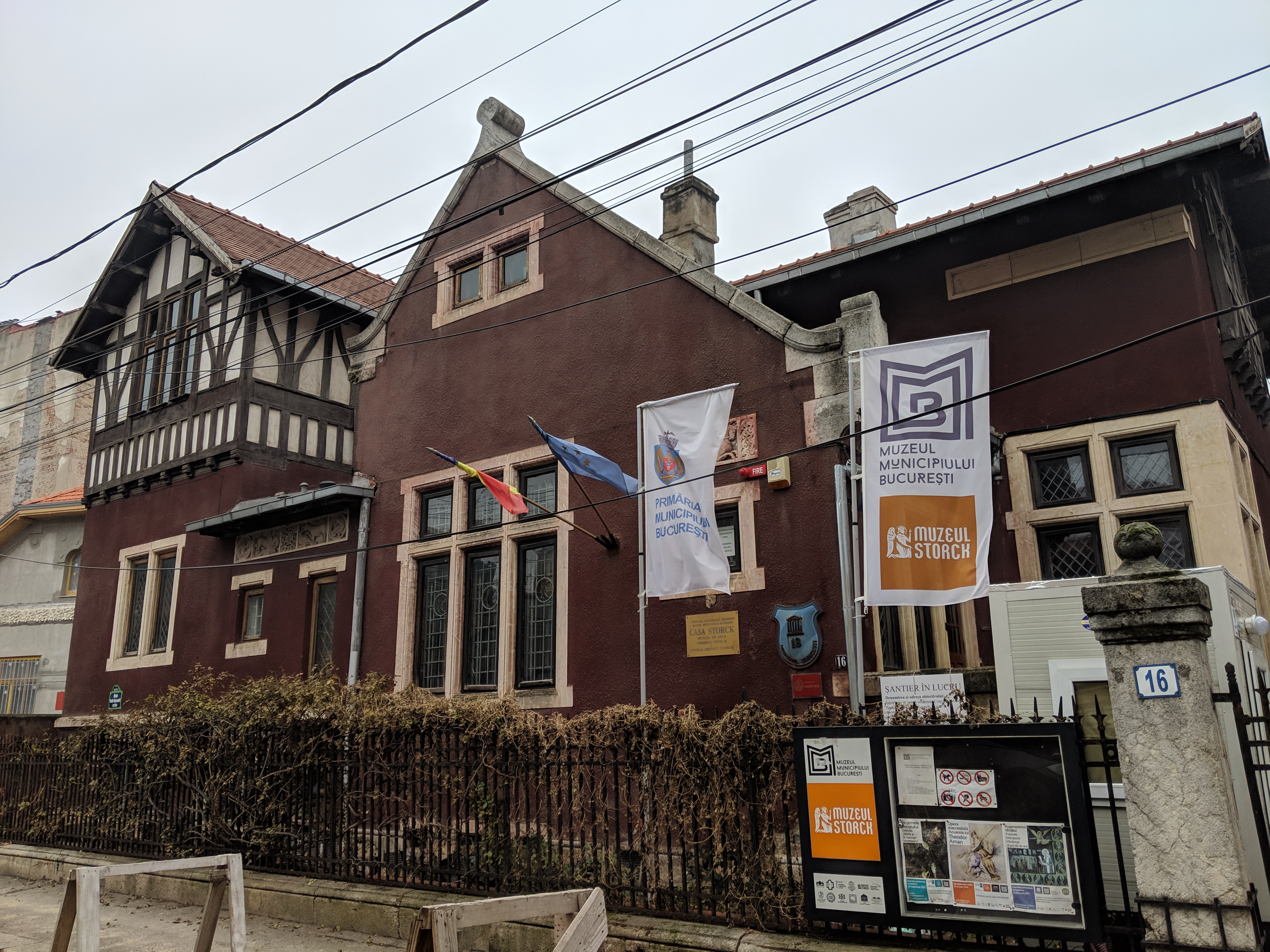
- Museum exterior
- Established: May 1951
- Location: Strada Vasile Alecsandri, nr. 16, Bucharest, Romania
- Type: art museum
- Website: muzeulbucurestiului.ro/muzeul-storck.html

The Frederic and Cecilia Cuțescu-Storck Art Museum (Romanian: Muzeul de Artă Frederic Storck și Cecilia Cuțescu-Storck) is a modern art museum located in Bucharest, Romania, dedicated to the artists Frederic Storck and Cecilia Cuțescu-Storck.

The museum is located in the house designed by the artists with the help of architect Alexandru Clavel and constructed in 1912–1913. The artists donated their collection to the government which opened the museum in 1951. Currently, the house belongs to the brothers Alvaro and Alexandru Botez, who have agreed to lend it to The Bucharest Municipality Museum in order for the art collection to be preserved.

The museum presents works of artists of the Storck family: Karl Storck, Carol Storck, Frederic Storck, and Cecilia Cuţescu-Storck. It also includes objects of Medieval religious sculptures, as well as watercolours, coins, and medals by Carol Szathmari.

== Gallery ==
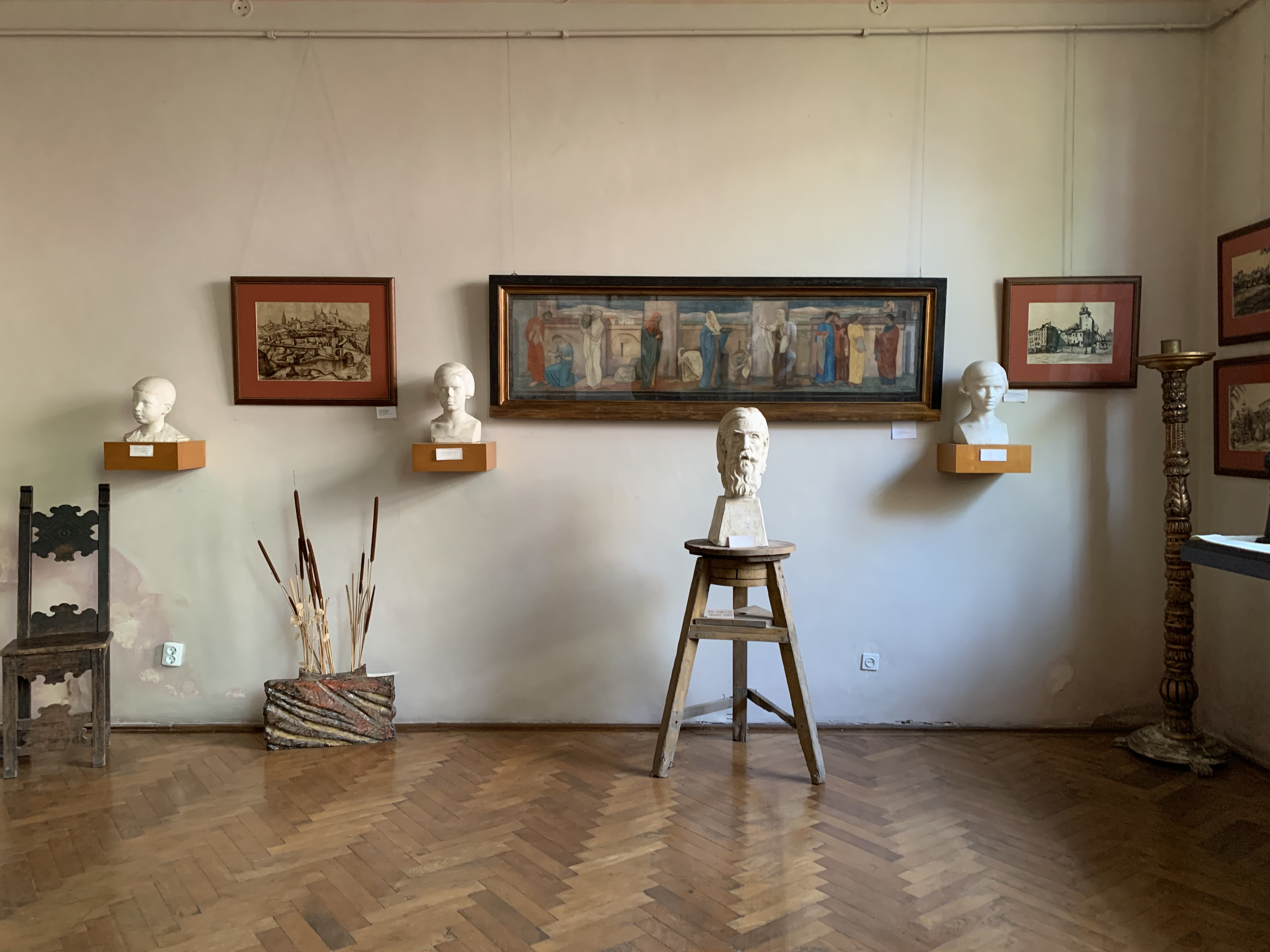
Displays

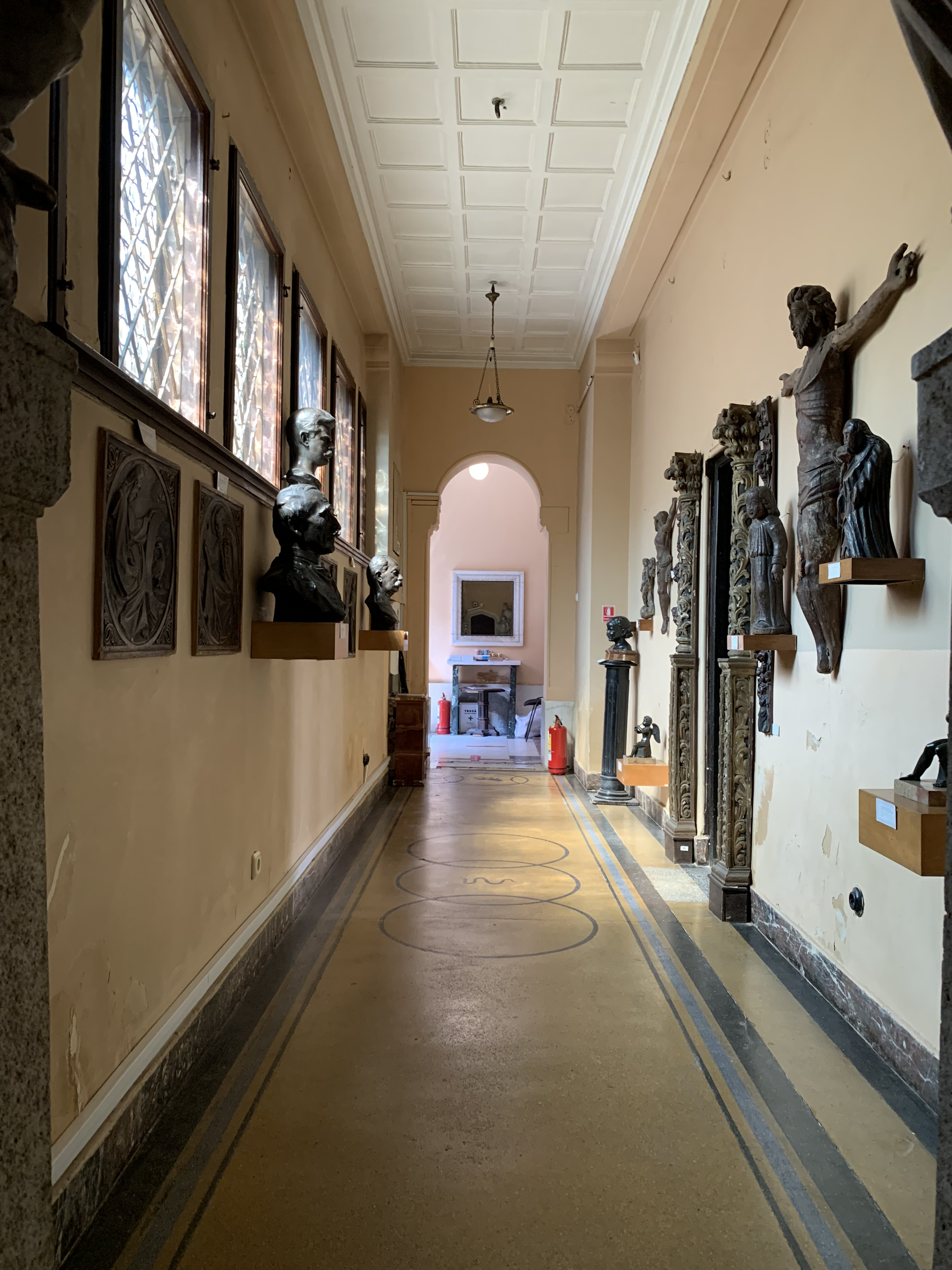
Displays

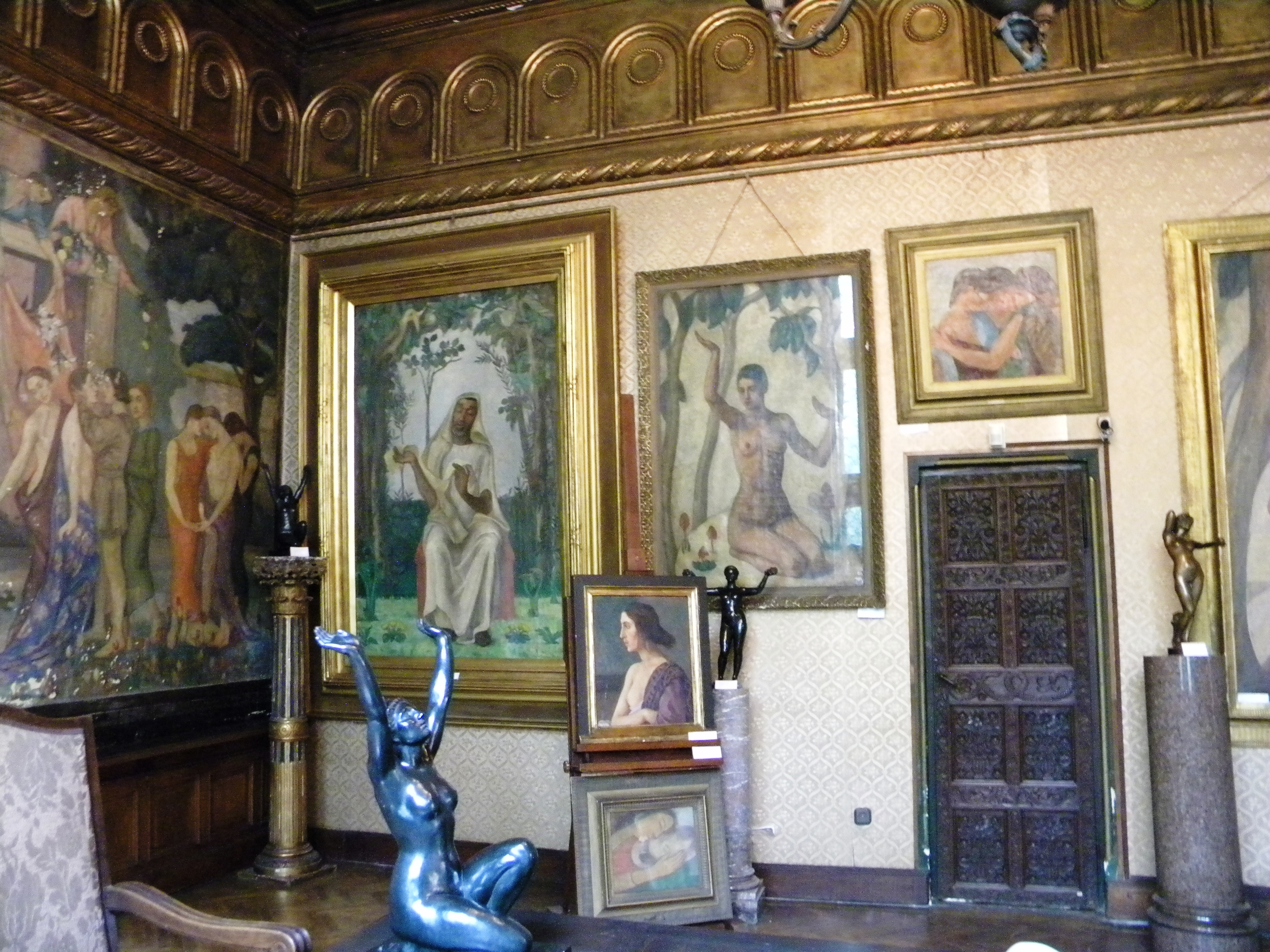
Interior of the museum

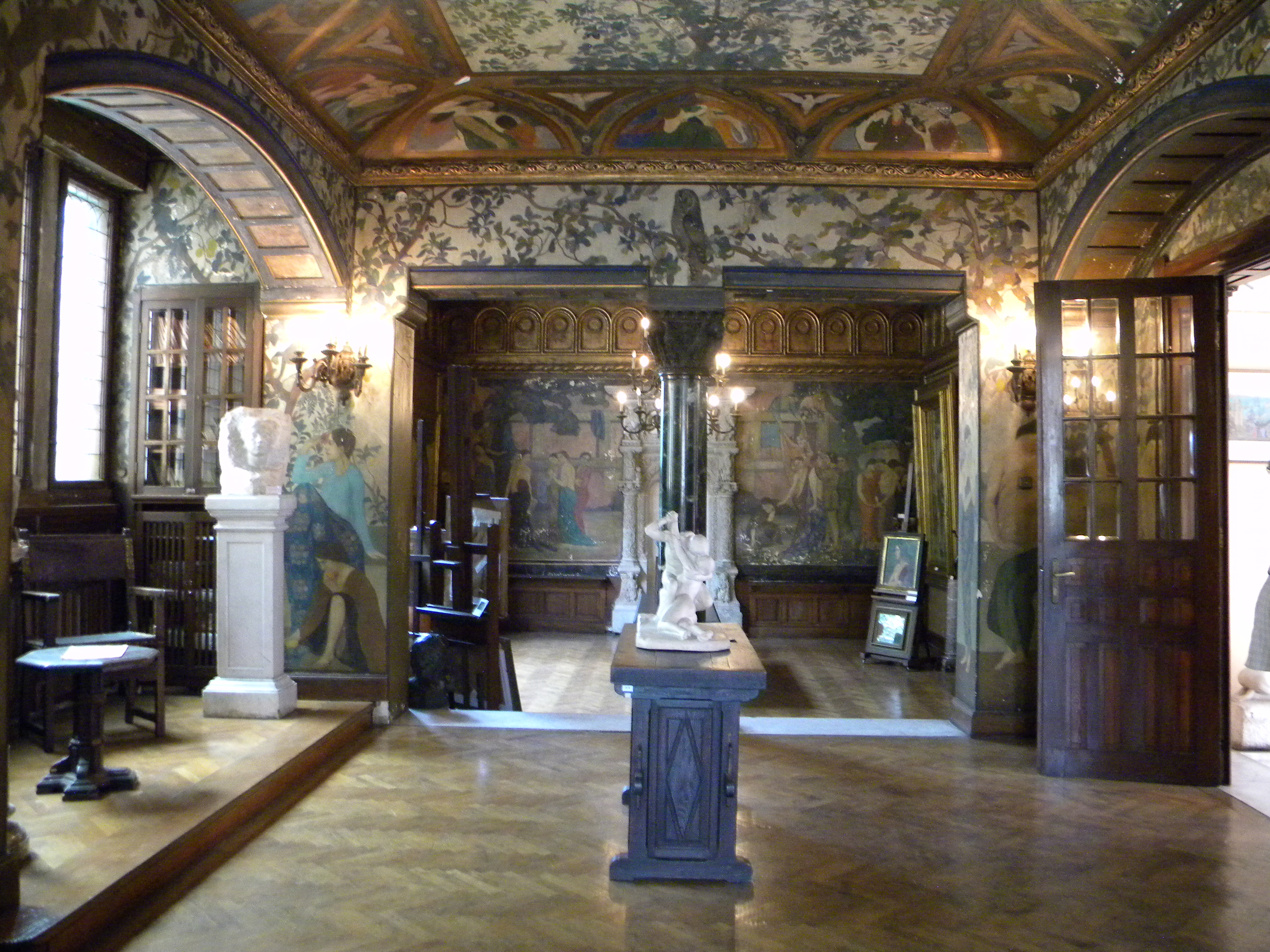

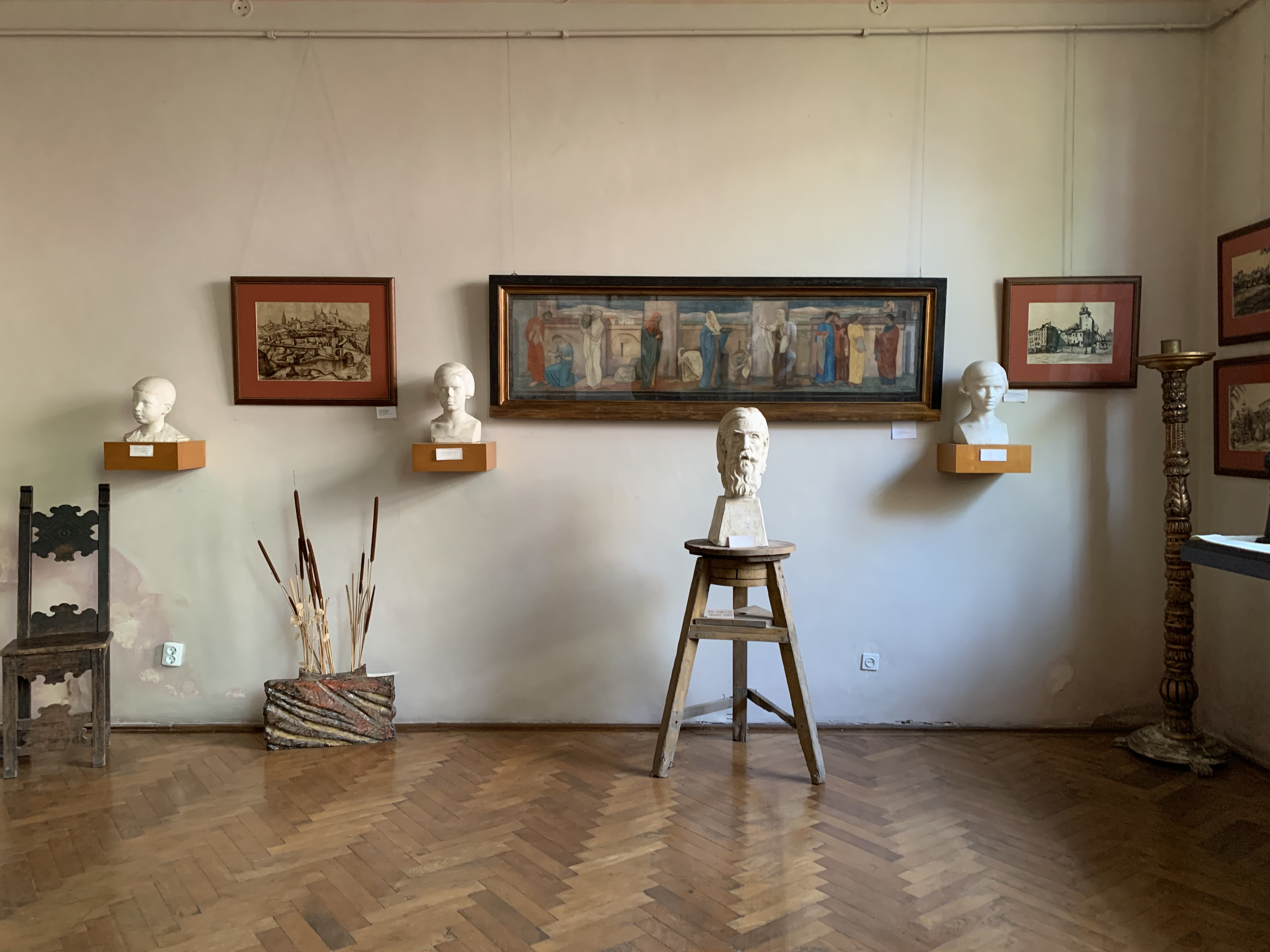

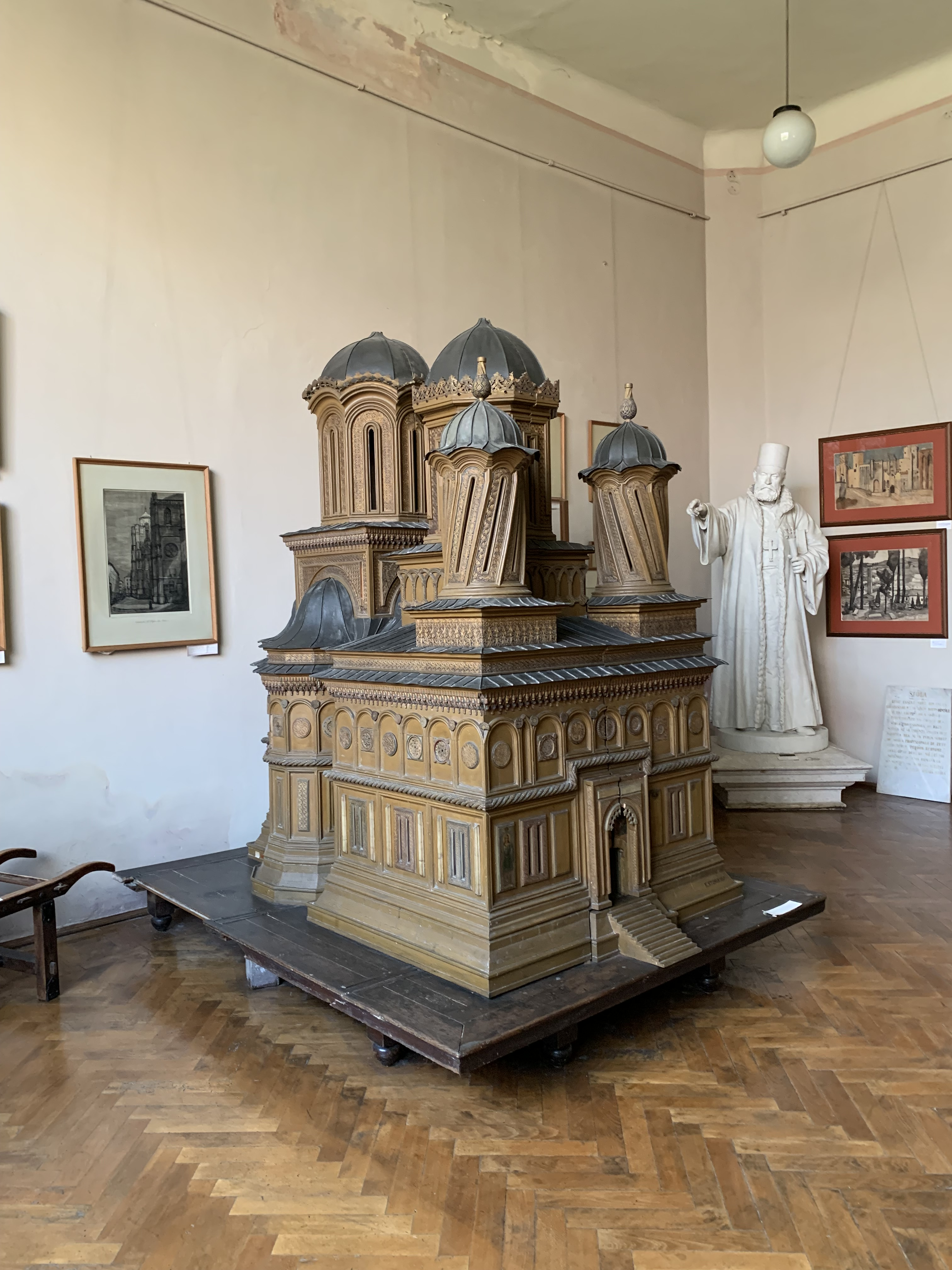
Model of the Curtea de Argeș Monastery

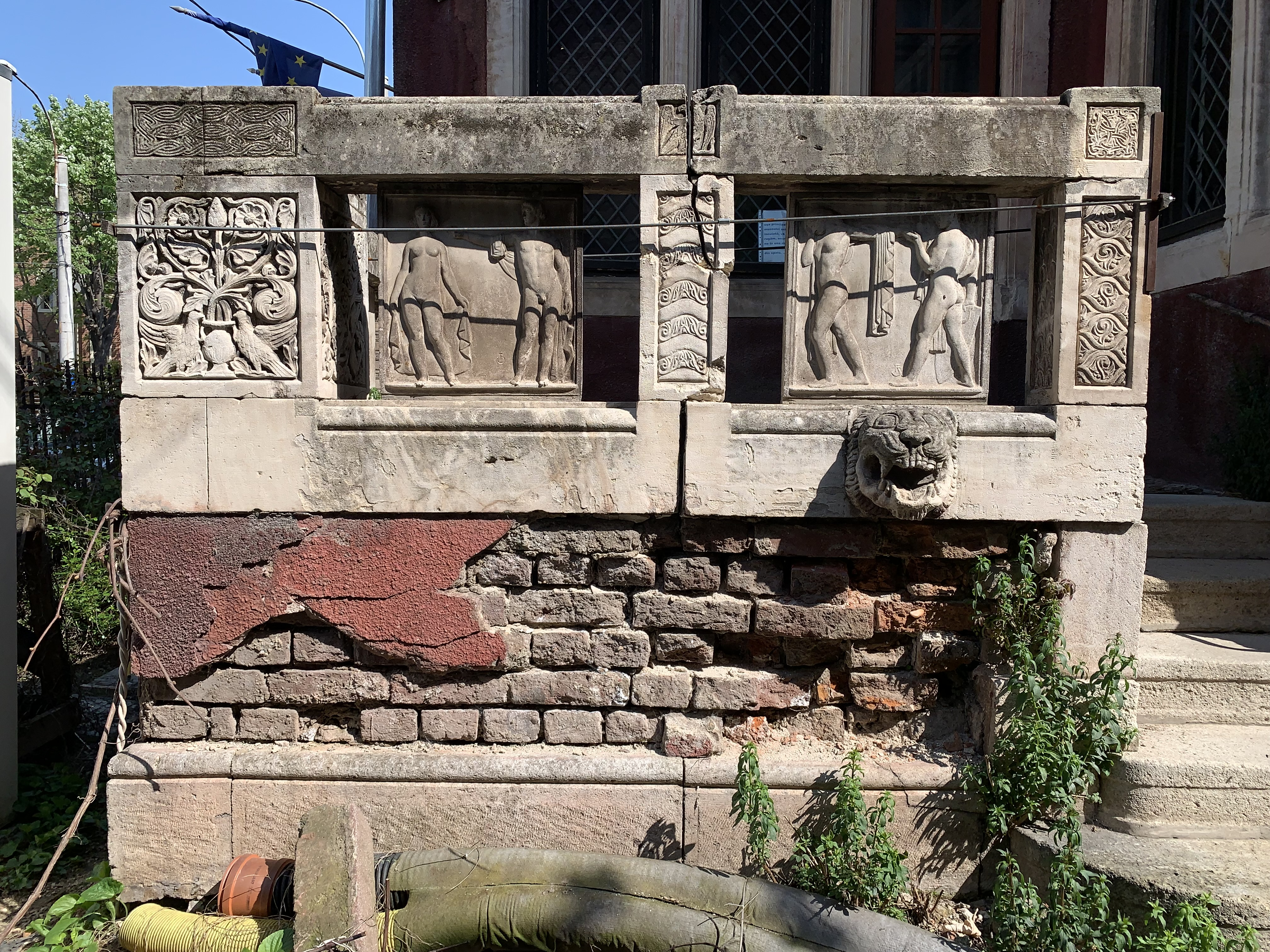

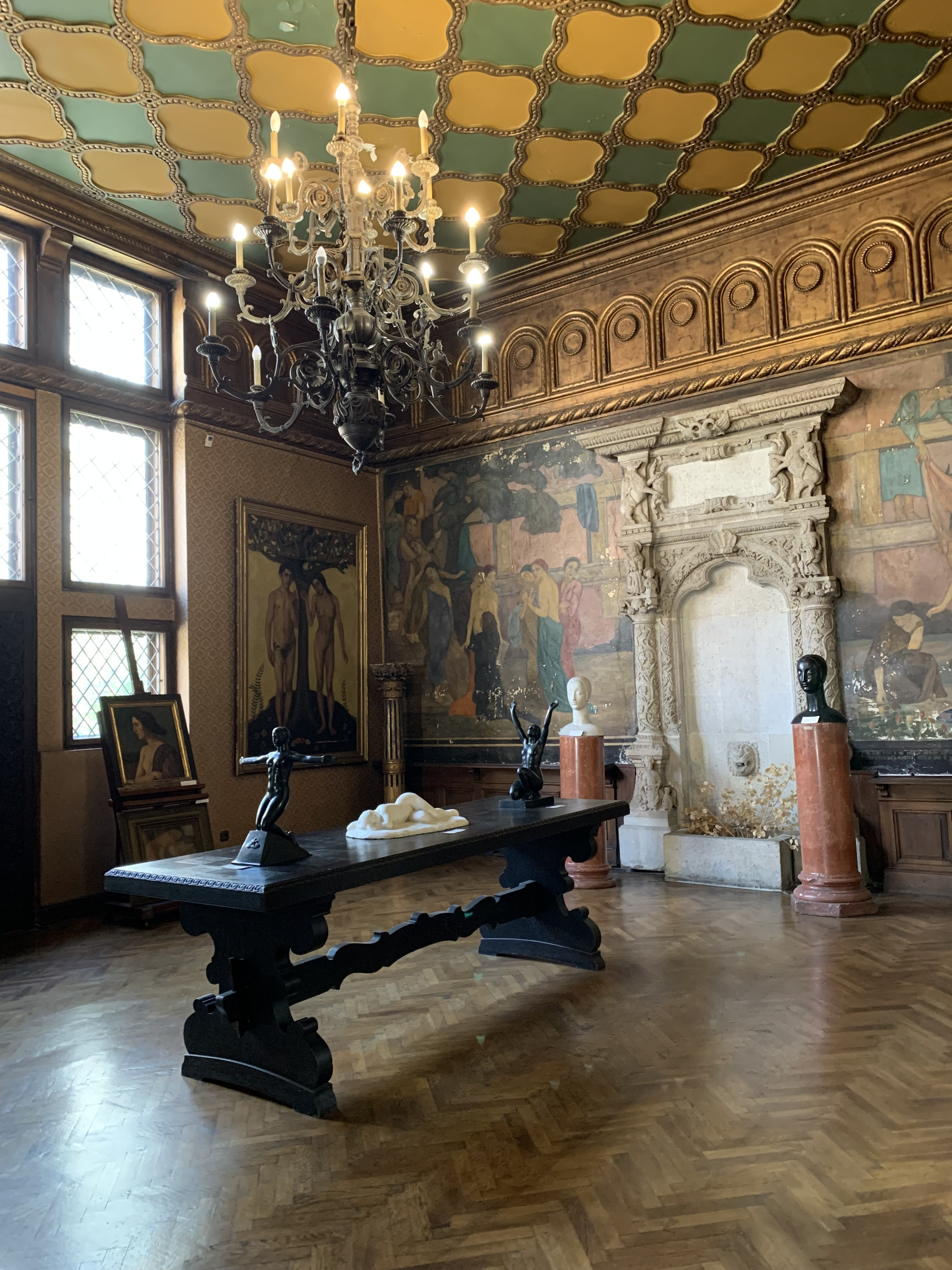

== See also ==
- List of museums in Bucharest
