= Frederic Storck =

Romanian sculptor

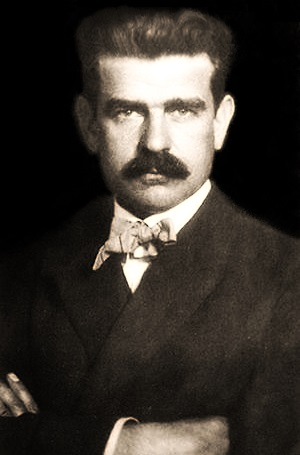
- Frederic Storck (date unknown)
- Born: January 19, 1872; Bucharest, Romania
- Died: December 26, 1942 (aged 70); Bucharest, Kingdom of Romania
- Education: Bucharest National University of Arts
- Known for: Sculptor
- Partner: Cecilia Cuțescu-Storck
- Father: Karl Storck
- Relatives: Carol Storck

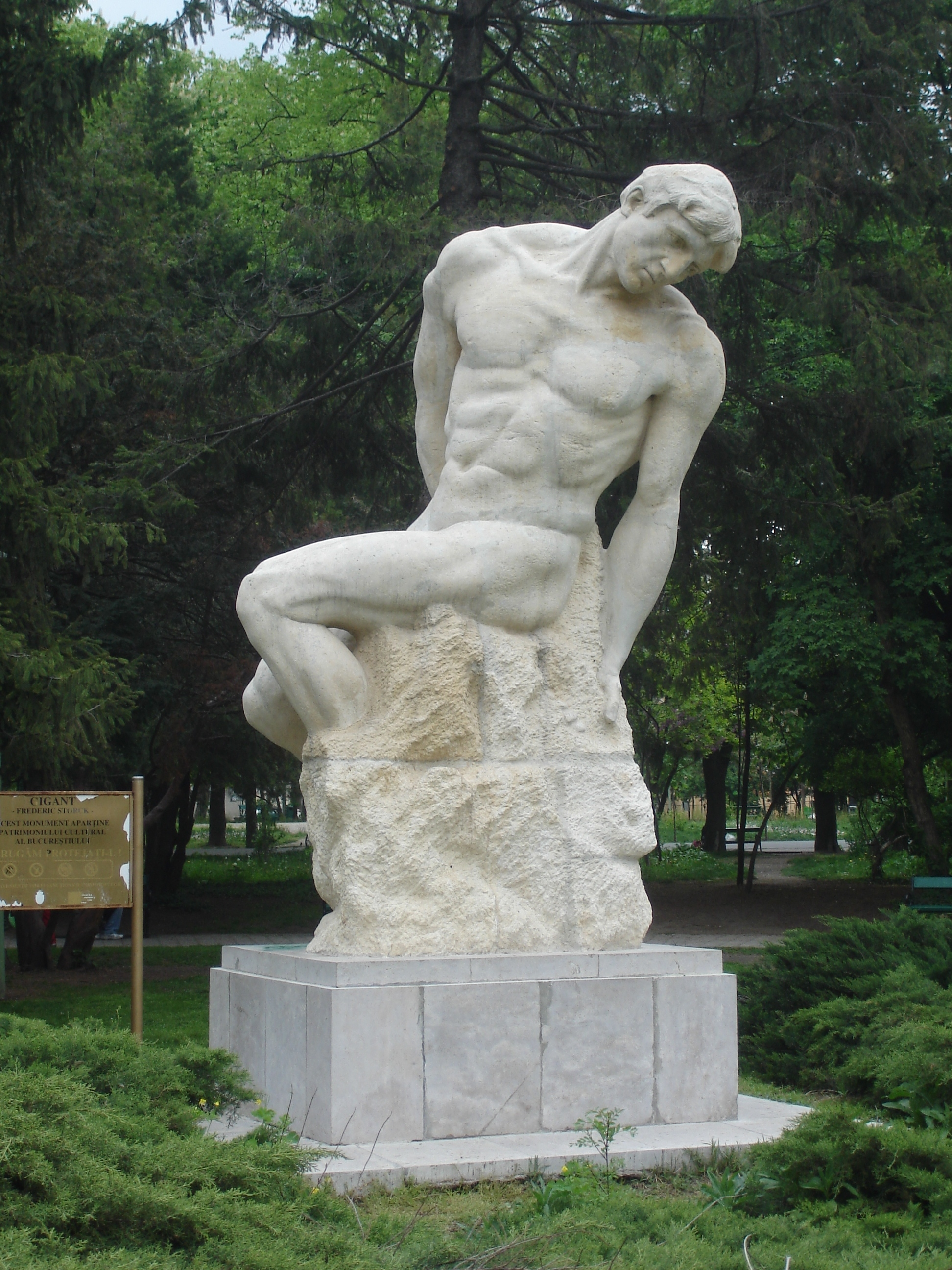
The Giant, at Carol Park

Frederic Storck (19 January 1872 – 26 December 1942) was a Romanian sculptor. His father was the sculptor Karl Storck. His brother, Carol Storck, was also a sculptor and his wife, Cecilia Cuțescu-Storck was a painter.

== Life and work ==
He studied at the Bucharest National University of Arts under Professor Ion Georgescu, then pursued further studies in Munich. Later, he became a Professor at the University of Arts himself and, together with Nicolae Vermont, Ștefan Luchian and others, was one of the founding members of "Tinerimea artistică" (Artistic Youth), a society devoted to Realism; drawing its inspiration from the lives of ordinary people.

Storck's sculptures followed the Classical tradition and featured portrait busts (notably, Ion Heliade Rădulescu, Alexandru Macedonski, Spiru Haret, Constantin Dobrescu-Argeș, King Carol I and Queen Elisabeth), as well as allegorical themes ("Truth" at the Palace of Justice, for example). His later sculptures became highly stylized.

Other notable works include:

- A statue of Mihai Eminescu; paid for by public subscription and currently at the central square in Galați.
- The Four Evangelists, mounted on the corners of the chapel at the Bellu Cemetery, designed by Ion Mincu.
- Marble sarcophagi at the tomb of Radu cel Mare at Dealu Monastery.
- The Giant, currently on display at Carol Park.

His home, designed by his wife, Cecilia, and decorated with murals, became the Frederic and Cecilia Cuțescu-Storck Art Museum in 1951. In addition to sculptures and paintings by members of the Storck family, the museum includes collections of furniture, old wood carvings, medals, coins, icons, pottery and other folk art objects.

In Balchik, now in Bulgaria, the Storck family owned a seafront mansion known as Villa Storck.
