= Palace of Justice, Bucharest =

Courthouse in Bucharest, Romania

Coordinates: 44.4288°N 26.0990°E

The Palace of Justice (Romanian: Palatul Justiției), located in Bucharest, Romania, was designed by the architects Albert Ballu and Ion Mincu and built between 1890 and 1895. The foundation stone was laid by King Carol I of Romania on October 7, 1890. The façade of the building is adorned with several statues representing allegories: Law, Justice, Truth, Force, and Prudence; the statues are the work of sculptors Carol Storck and Frederic Storck.

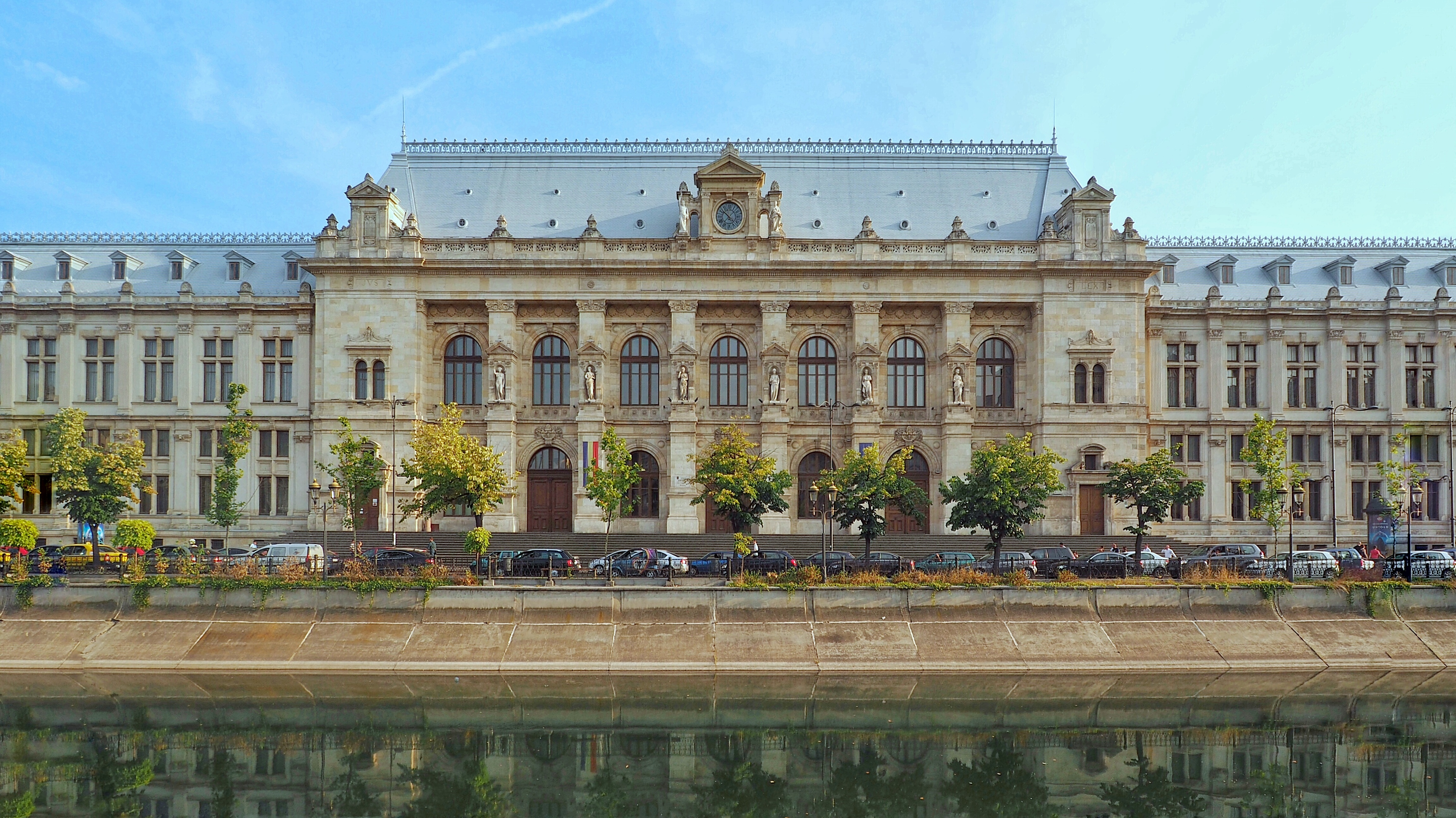
The Palace of Justice in 2016

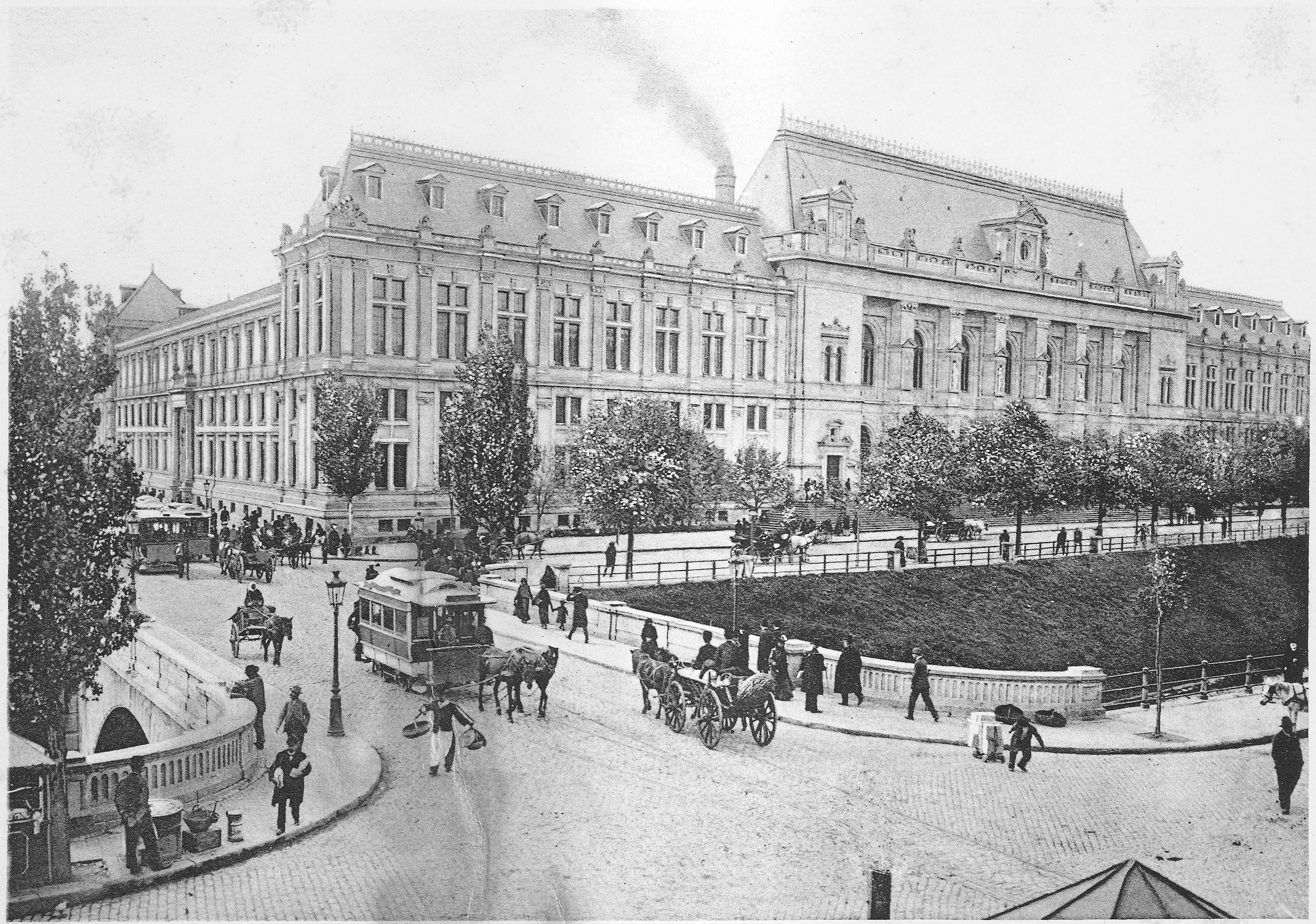
Palace of Justice circa 1900 (a horse-drawn tram to the left)

Located on the banks of the Dâmbovița River, the palace houses the Bucharest Court of Appeal, the Sector 5 Court, the National Union of Romanian Bars, and the Bucharest Bar. Its last major restoration was between 2003 and 2006.

The Palace has 690 rooms with a total area of 33,235 m^{2} (357,740 sq ft).
