= Ion Mincu =

Romanian architect (1852 - 1912)

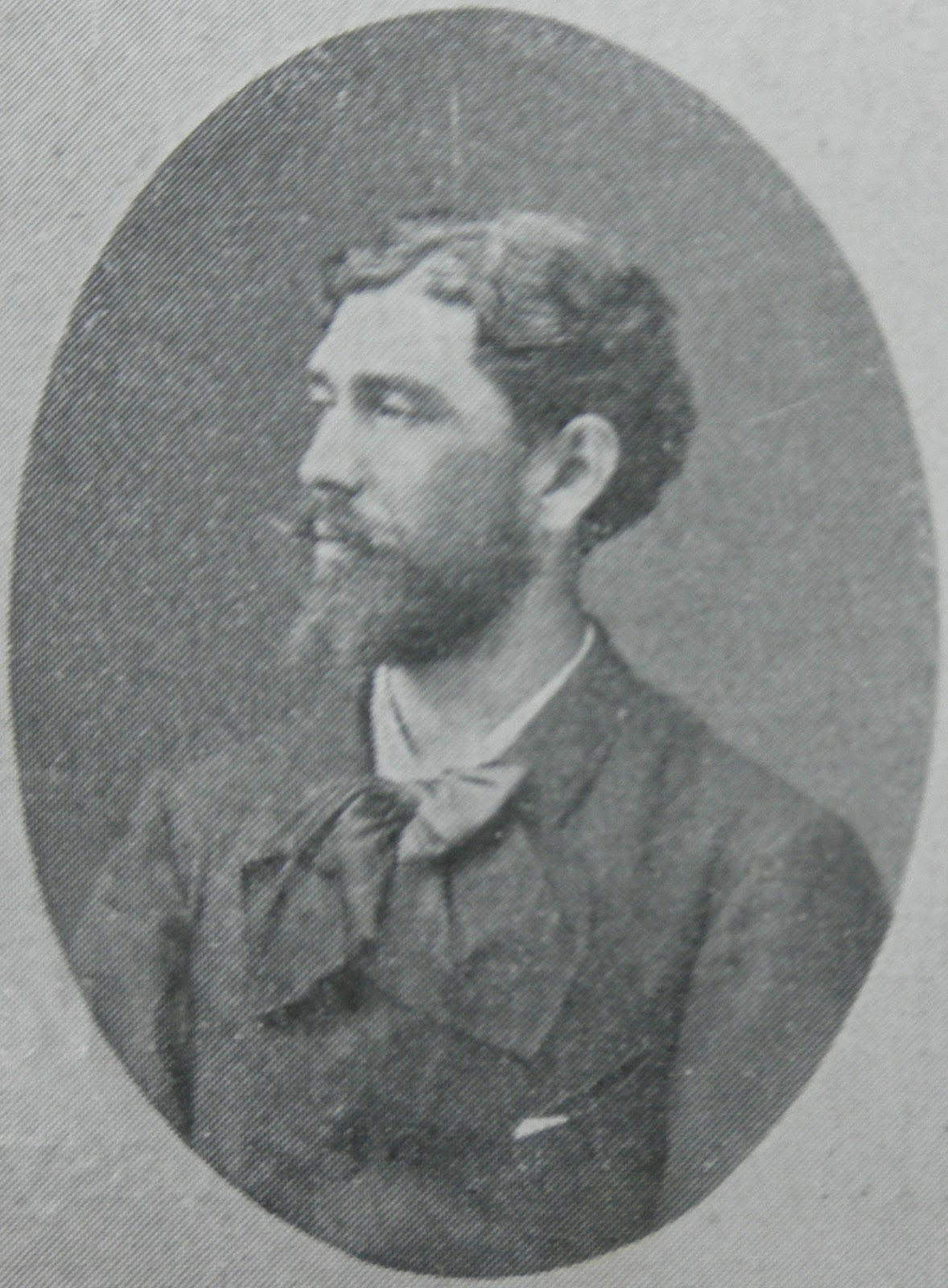
- Born: December 20, 1852; Focșani, Moldavia
- Died: December 6, 1912 (aged 59); Bucharest, Kingdom of Romania
- Resting place: Bellu Cemetery, Bucharest
- Education: School of Roads and Bridges; École des Beaux-Arts
- Occupation: Architect
- Buildings: Palace of Justice; Kiseleff Roadside Buffet; Central Girls' School
- Projects: Leading role in creating the Romanian Revival style

Ion Mincu (Romanian pronunciation: [iˈon ˈmiŋku]; December 20, 1852 – December 6, 1912 in Bucharest) was a Romanian architect known for having a leading role in the development of the Romanian Revival style. Most of his projects are located in Bucharest, including his main works, the Palace of Justice, the Kiseleff Roadside Buffet, and the Central Girls' School.

== Biography ==
Mincu was born in 1852 in Focșani, at the time in Putna County, Moldavia. He was the son of Pavel and Maria, and had three brothers and four sisters (one of them, Sultana, became the mother of Duiliu Zamfirescu). He studied from 1863 to 1871 at Unirea High School, in Focșani and from 1871 to 1875 at the School of Roads and Bridges, in Bucharest, becoming an engineer. From 1873 to 1877 he served as chief engineer for Putna County, residing in Focșani. During that time, he also worked on the construction of the Ploiești–Predeal road (now part of the DN1 road).

Starting in 1877 Mincu pursued his studies in Paris, first for a year at the École Spéciale d'Architecture under the guidance of Émile Trélat, and then at the École des Beaux-Arts, having as teachers Julien Guadet, Remy de Louanges, and François Thierry-Lagrange. In 1883 he received an award from the Central Association of the French Architects, while in 1884 he received his architect diploma. Upon returning to Romania, he married in 1887, and had a daughter, Maria.

He promoted a specific Romanian style in architecture, by integrating in his works the specific style of traditional Romanian architecture. Mincu was the most important Romanian architect for Art Nouveau and Romanian Revival architecture. As a recognition to his importance in the Romanian school of architecture, since 1953, the Ion Mincu University of Architecture and Urbanism in Bucharest bears his name.

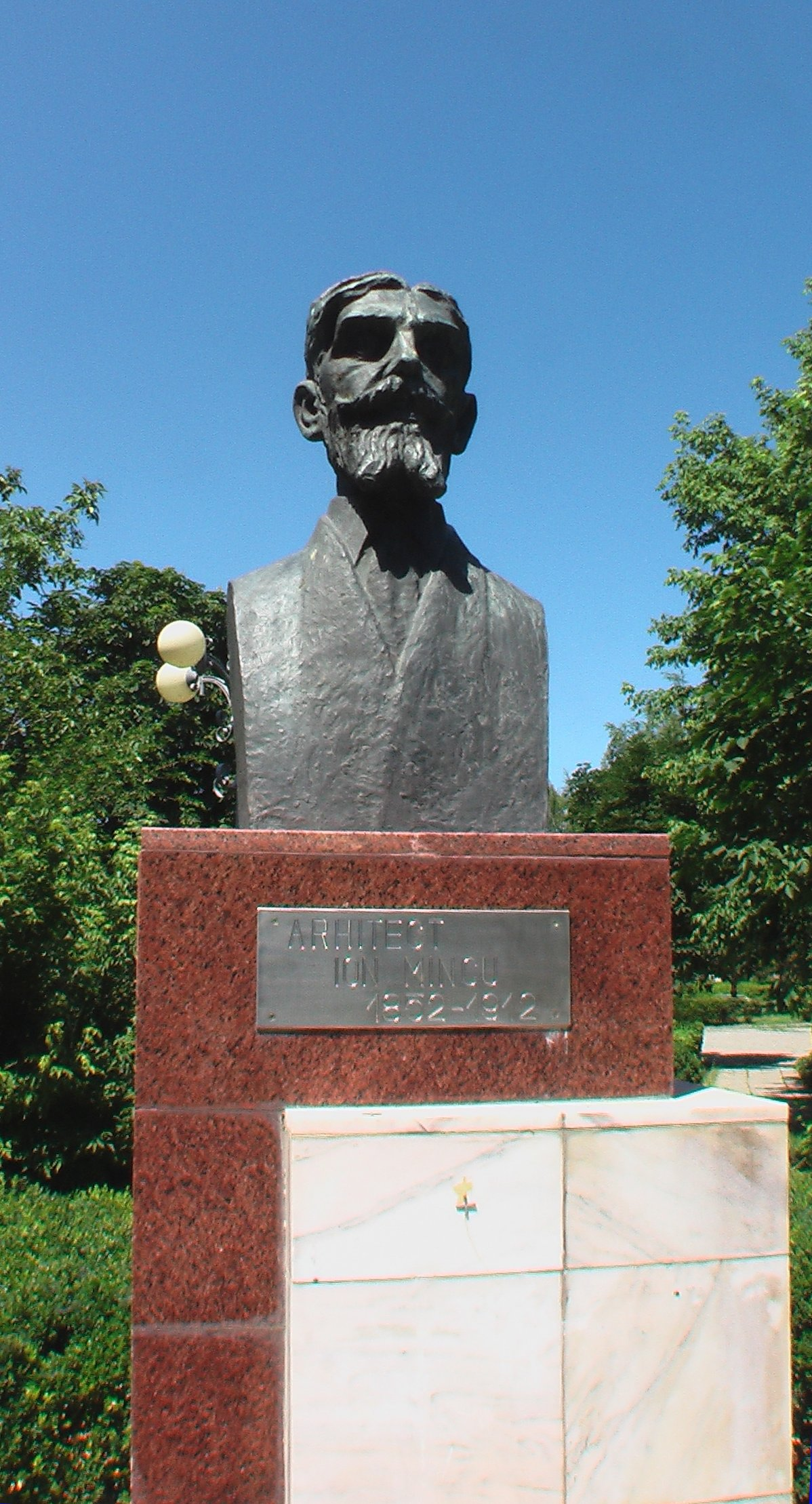
Bust of Ion Mincu in Focșani

From 1892 to 1912 he taught architecture and became one of the founding members of the Architecture School of the Romanian Architects Association. He was the teacher of Toma T. Socolescu, another remarkable Romanian architect. From 1903 to 1912 he served as president of the Romanian Architects Association.

From 1895 to 1899 he was deputy for Putna County in the Parliament of Romania. He died in Bucharest in 1912, and was buried in the city's Bellu Cemetery.

In 2012 he was elected posthumously a member of the Romanian Academy. High schools in Focșani, Tulcea, and Vaslui, as well as streets in Bucharest, Cluj-Napoca, Focșani, and Oradea bear his name. The house where Mincu lived is now the residence of the Order of Romanian Architects.

== Works ==
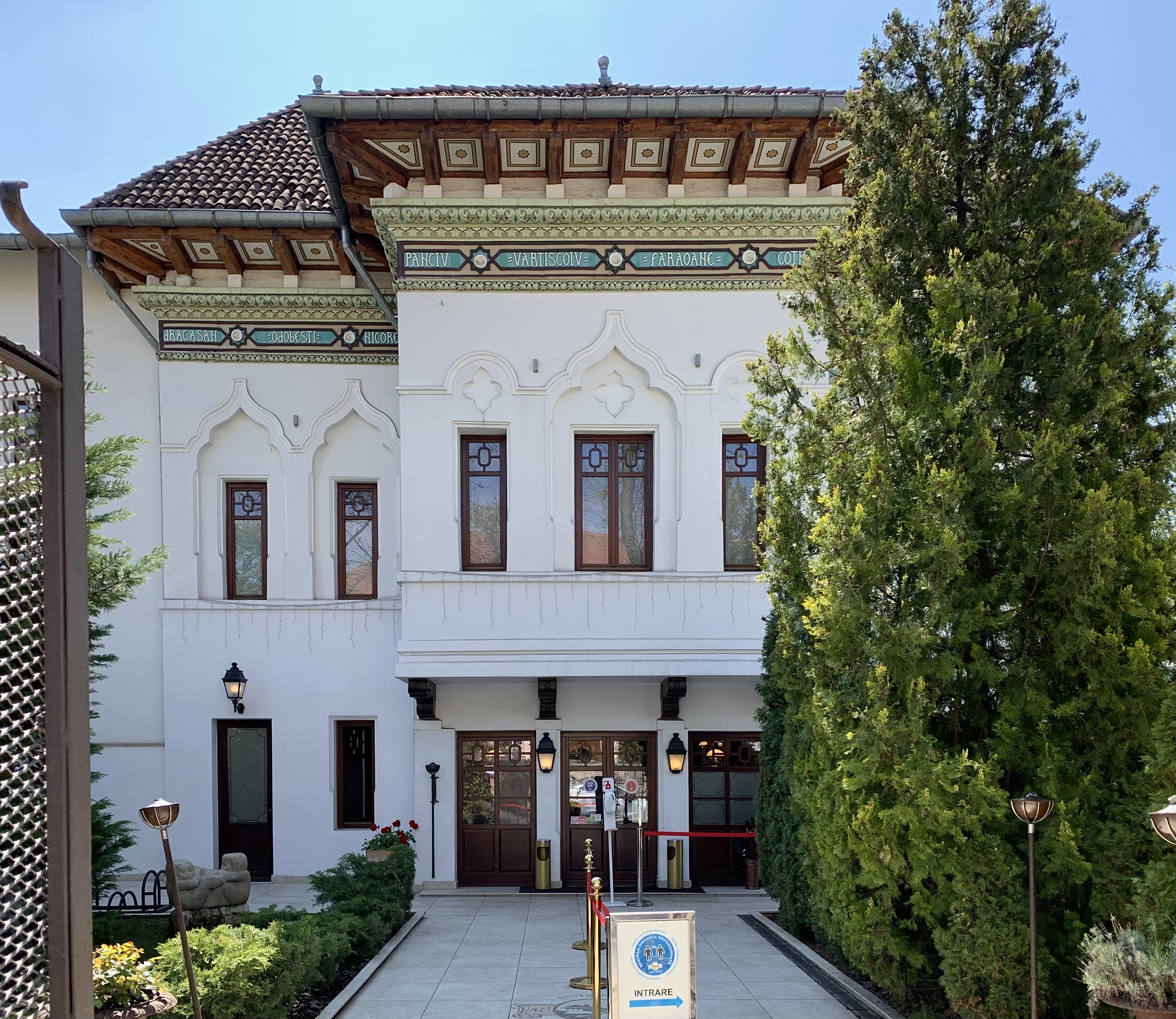
The Kiseleff Roadside Buffet

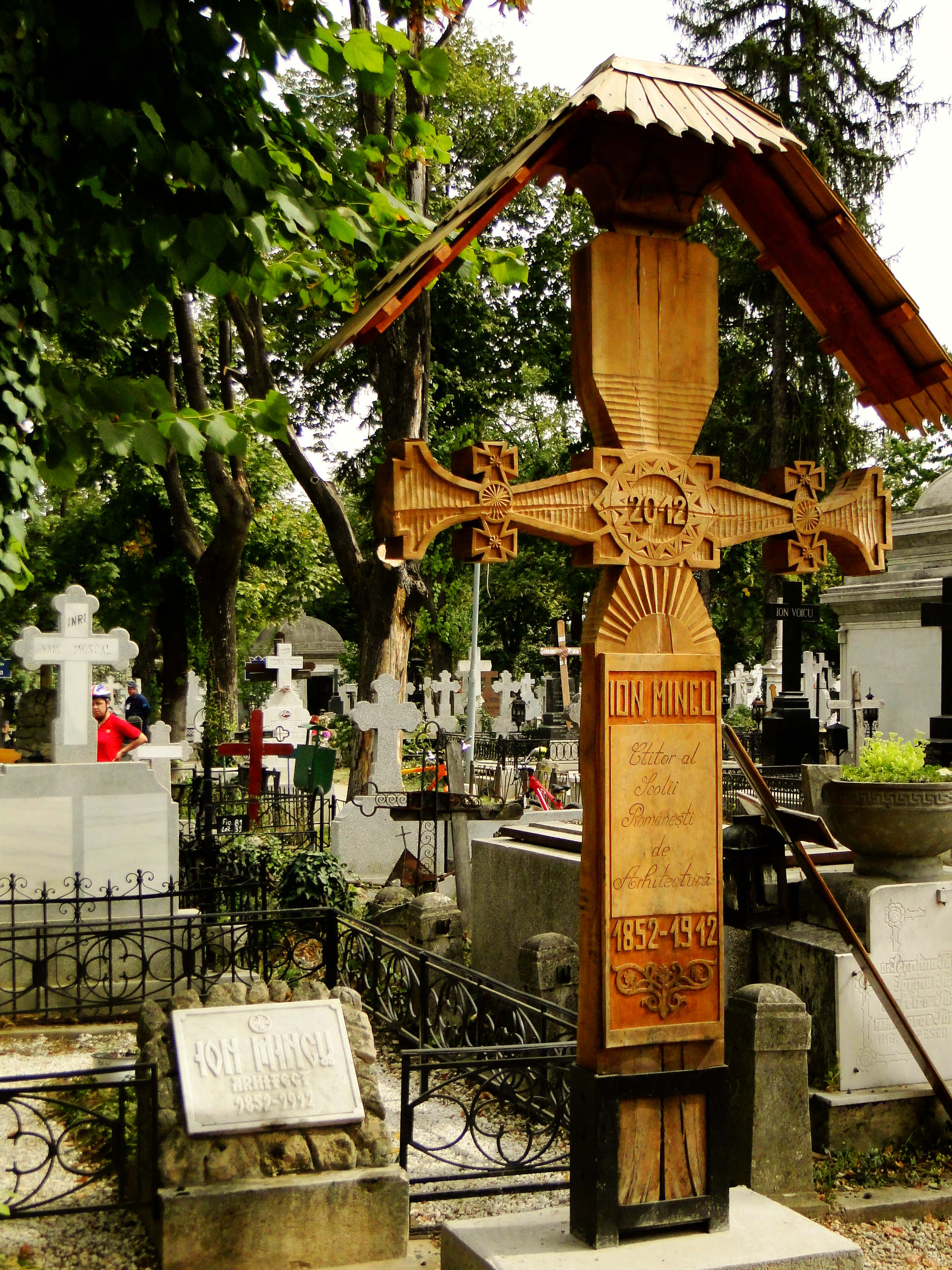
Mincu's grave at Bellu Cemetery

- Kiseleff Roadside Buffet, Bucharest (1882–1892). Located at the intersection of Șoseaua Kiseleff with Architect Ion Mincu Street, it now houses the Casa Doina Restaurant.
- Lahovary House, Bucharest (1884–1886)
- Restoration of Monteoru House, Bucharest (1887–1889)
- Vernescu House, Bucharest (1887–1889). For many years this was considered the most beautiful residential building in the city.
- Manolescu-Vitzu House, Bucharest (1888)
- Ștefan Vlădoianu House, Bucharest (1889)
- Central Girls' School, Bucharest (1890)
- Interior decoration of the Palace of Justice, Bucharest (1890–1895)
- Interior decoration of the Cathedral of Saints Peter and Paul, Constanța (1895)
- School No. 11 "Ion Heliade Rădulescu", Bucharest (1896). Constructed in Mincu's style by his student, Giulio Magni.
- Robescu House, Galați (1896–1897)
- Villa Robescu, Sinaia (1897)
- Nicolae Petrașcu House, Piața Romană, Bucharest (1904)
- Galați County Prefecture, Galați (1905–1906)
- Commerce Bank building, Craiova (1906, finished by Constantin Iotzu in 1916). Now the Craiova City Hall.
- Restoration of Stavropoleos Monastery, Bucharest (1904–1910)
