= Monteoru House =

Heritage site in Bucharest, Romania

Palatul Monteoru
- Palatul Monteoru/Grand Café de Bucharest
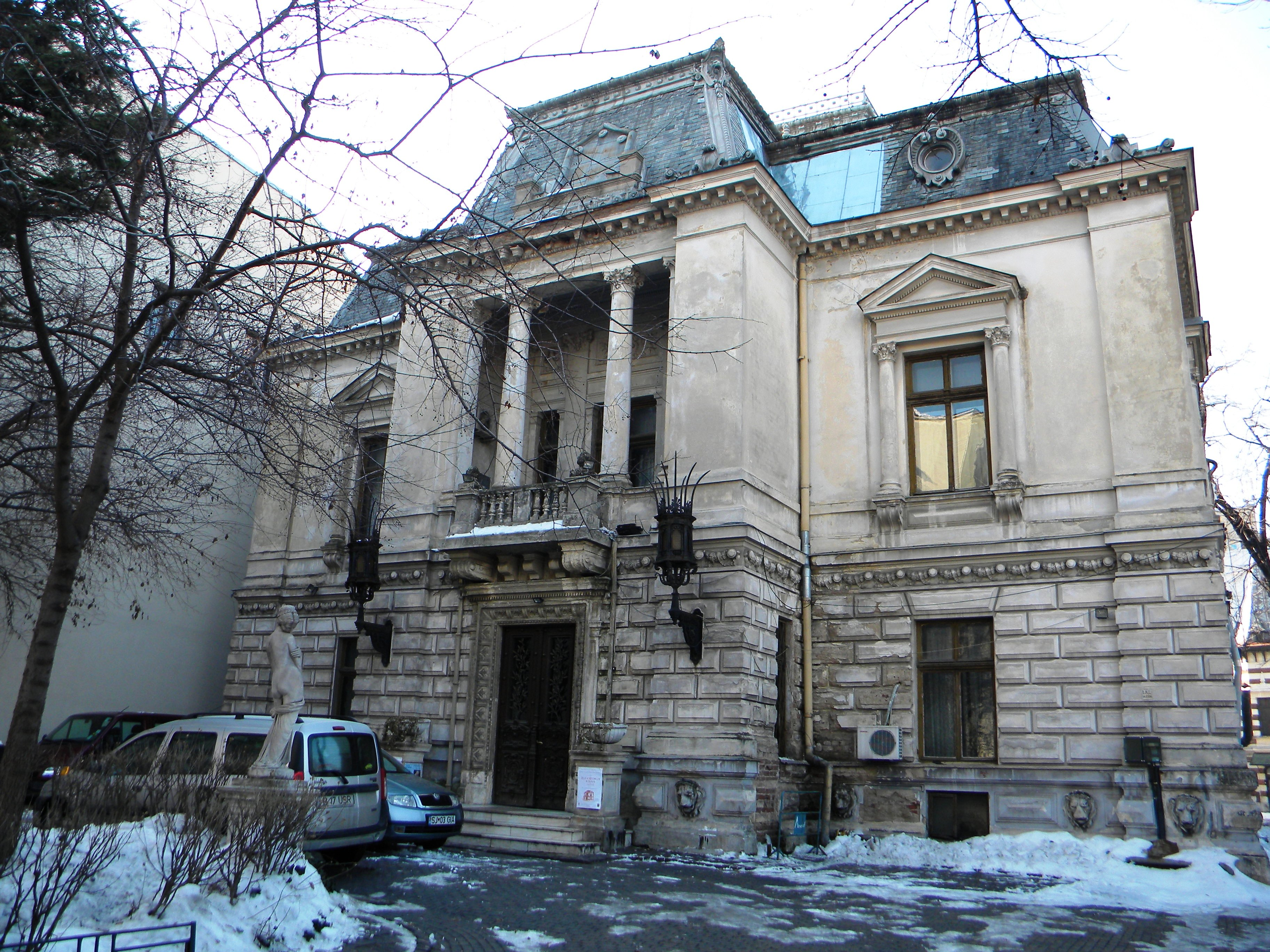
- Monteoru House in 2012
- Interactive map of the Palatul Monteoru area

General information
- Location: Bucharest, Romania, Calea Victoriei 115, Sector 1
- Coordinates: 44°26′42″N 26°05′26″E

Monteoru House is a historic house and monument in Bucharest, Romania, which now operates as the bar/restaurant Grand Café de Bucharest.

Monteoru House was built in 1874. It is located on Victory Avenue (Calea Victoriei), one of the main arteries of downtown Bucharest. It is classified as a historical monument of national interest, under the number B-II-mA-19863. Between 1949 and 2013 it was the headquarters of the Union of Writers of Romania (Uniunea Scriitorilor din Romania).

== Restitution to Monteoru family ==
The Bucharest Court ruled in 2010 that the building should be returned to the heirs of the Monteoru family from whom it had been seized under the communist regime. This decision was appealed to the Bucharest Court of Appeal in 2013 which upheld the initial decision. The writers' union left the building that year and it was returned to the family, though not until an appeal was launched by writers and other cultural figures asking the Romanian state to take on the building to keep it focused on cultural output.

In 2015, the owners declared their intention to transform the palace into a multicultural center. In the same year, a restaurant was opened in the garden and the palace was planned to be used for live music shows, exhibitions, fairs, events for children, and other entertainment activities.

A restaurant/bar opened in the building in May 2026, operating under the name Grand Café de Bucharest.
