= Carol Davila =

Romanian physician (1828–1884)

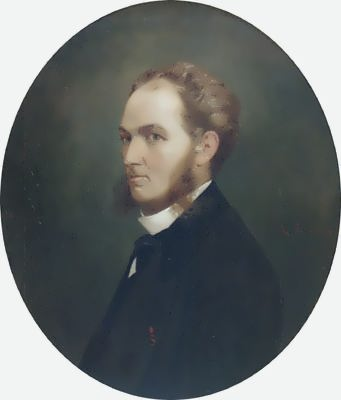
Carol Davila - portrait by Theodor Aman

Carol Davila (Romanian pronunciation: [ˈkarol daviˈla]; 1828 – 24 August 1884) was a Romanian medical doctors of Italian descent. He is considered to be the father of Romanian medicine.

== Biography ==
He started from humble beginnings, most probably as an abandoned child, and the surname Davila was bestowed on him by his adoptive family and guardian.

Davila studied medicine at the University of Paris, graduating in February 1853. In March 1853, he arrived in Romania. He was the organizer of the military medical service for the Romanian Army and of the country's public health system. Davila, together with Nicolae Kretzulescu, inaugurated medical training in Romania in 1857, by founding the National School of Medicine and Pharmacy. It was he who had determined government authorities to issue the first official instructions concerning the health care of factory workers and the organisation of medical districts in the country.

It was due to his many activities that several scientific associations appeared in Romania: the Medical Society (1857), the Red Cross Society (1876), the Natural Sciences Society (1876). With his assistance, two medical journals entered print: the Medical Register (1862) and the Medical Gazette (1865). During the Independence War (1877-1878) he was the head of the Army's sanitary service.

Davila is also credited with the invention of the Davila tincture for the treatment of cholera, an opioid-based oral solution in use for symptomatic management of diarrhea.

Today, the University of Medicine and Pharmacy in Bucharest, the largest of its kind in Romania, is named in his honor.

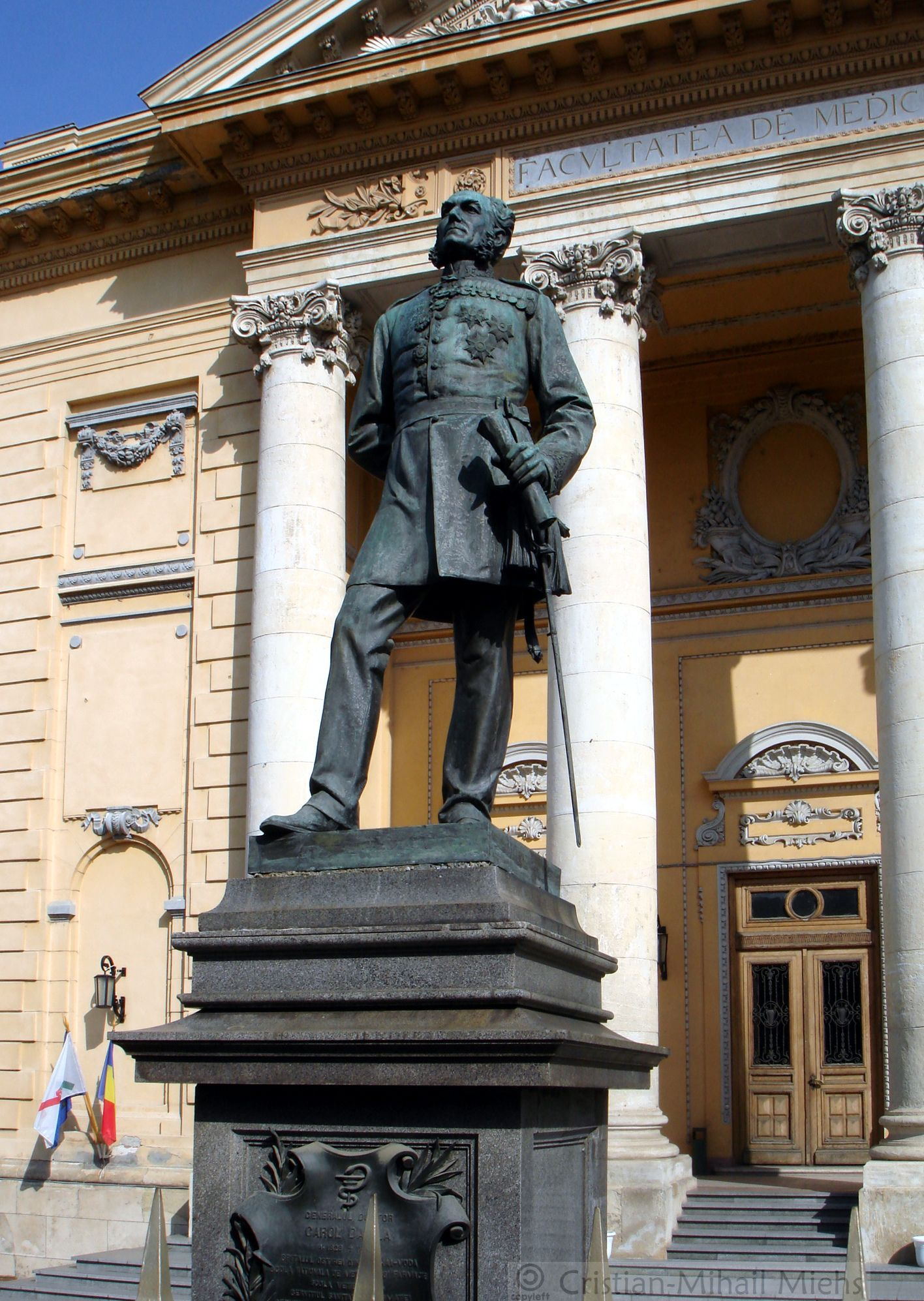
Statue of Carol Davila by Karl Storck, in front of the University of Medicine and Pharmacy in Bucharest

On 14 January 1874, his wife, Ana Racoviţă, a descendant of the Racoviţă and Golescu boyar families, was accidentally poisoned when a colleague of Davila's gave her strychnine instead of quinine. Davila's son Alexandru was a noted dramatist and friend of King Carol I.

== Works ==
- Syphilis Prophylaxis (1853)
- Athmospheric Air (1871).
