= Carol Storck =

Romanian sculptor

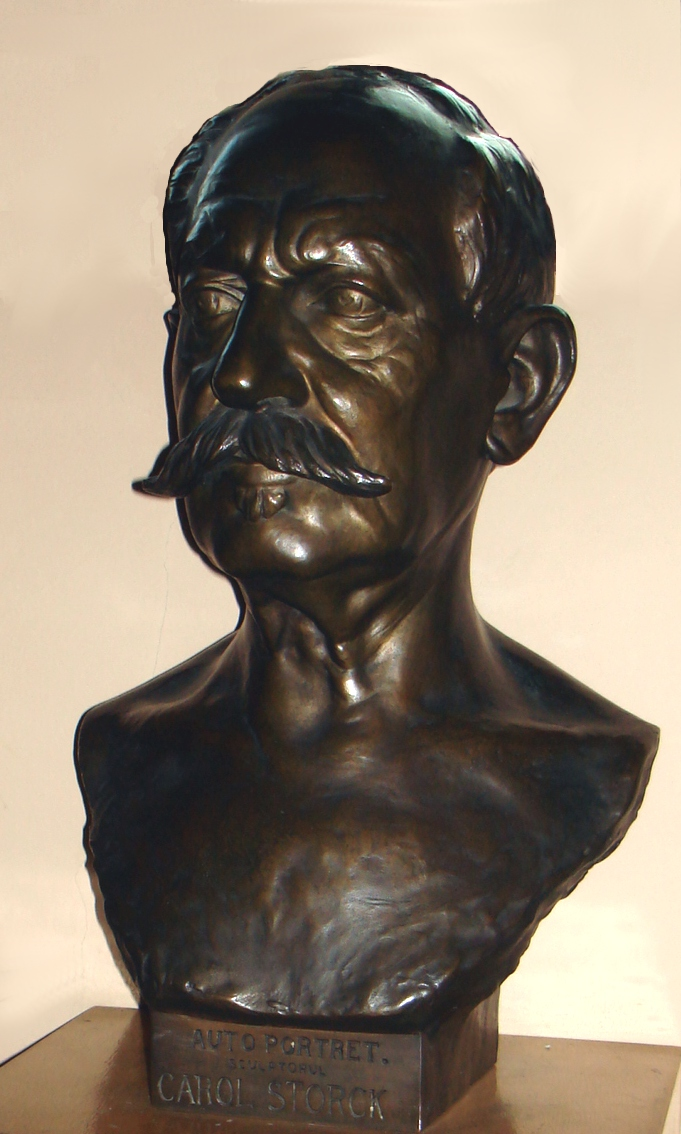
Self-portrait bust (1926)

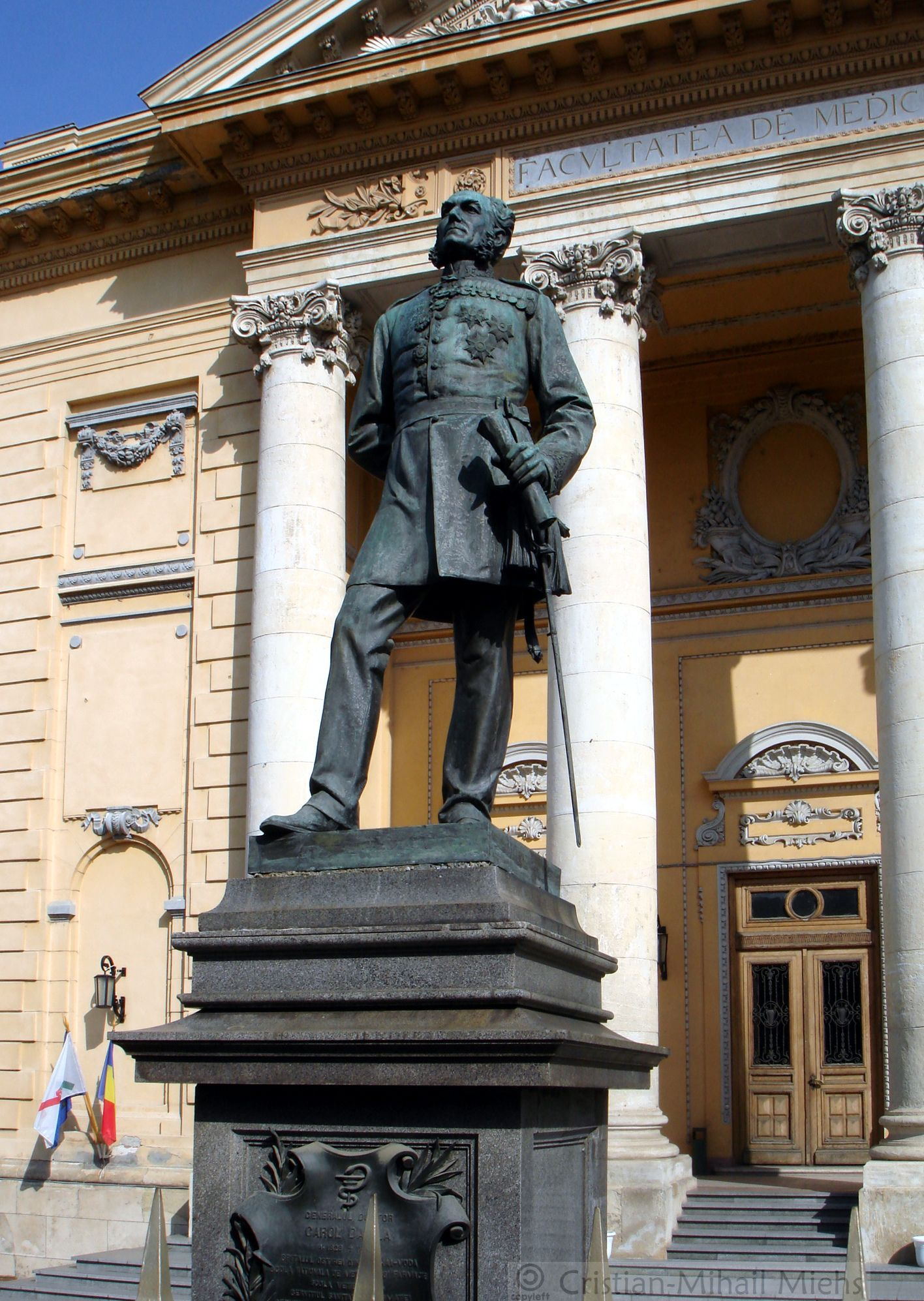
Storck's notable work depicting Gen. Dr. Carol Davila, photographed in September 2012

Carol Storck (10 May 1854, Bucharest – 1926) was a Romanian sculptor. He was the son of Karl Storck and the brother of Frederic Storck, both sculptors.

== Life and work ==
In 1871, Storck studied at the Royal Academy of Arts in Florence with Augusto Rivalta. Five years later, he had a showing at the Centennial Exposition in Philadelphia and remained there to study until 1880.

Storck produced three large works that decorate the Palace of Justice in Bucharest. He also created a monument in front of the Carol Davila University of Medicine and Pharmacy in that same city. Storck's sculpture depicts and is dedicated to the educational facility's namesake, Gen. Dr. Carol Davila.

Many of his finished works are collected in the Storck Museum alongside other works by his family.

== See also ==
- Sculpture in Europe after early Greece
