= Karl Storck =

Hessian-born Romanian sculptor and art theorist

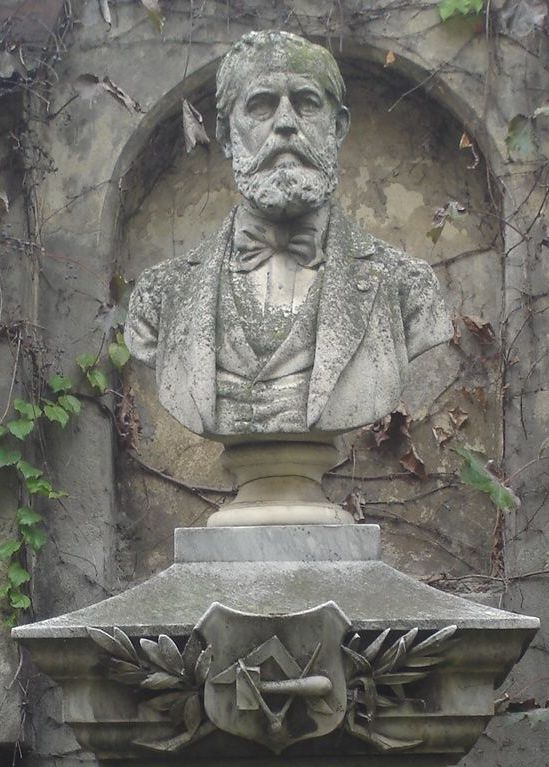
- Bust of Karl Storck by Frederic Storck, at the Evangelical Cemetery in Bucharest
- Born: May 21, 1826; Hanau, Grand Duchy of Hesse
- Died: March 30, 1887 (aged 60); Bucharest, Kingdom of Romania
- Resting place: Evangelical Lutheran Cemetery, Bucharest
- Known for: sculpture, engraving, art theory
- Movement: Academic

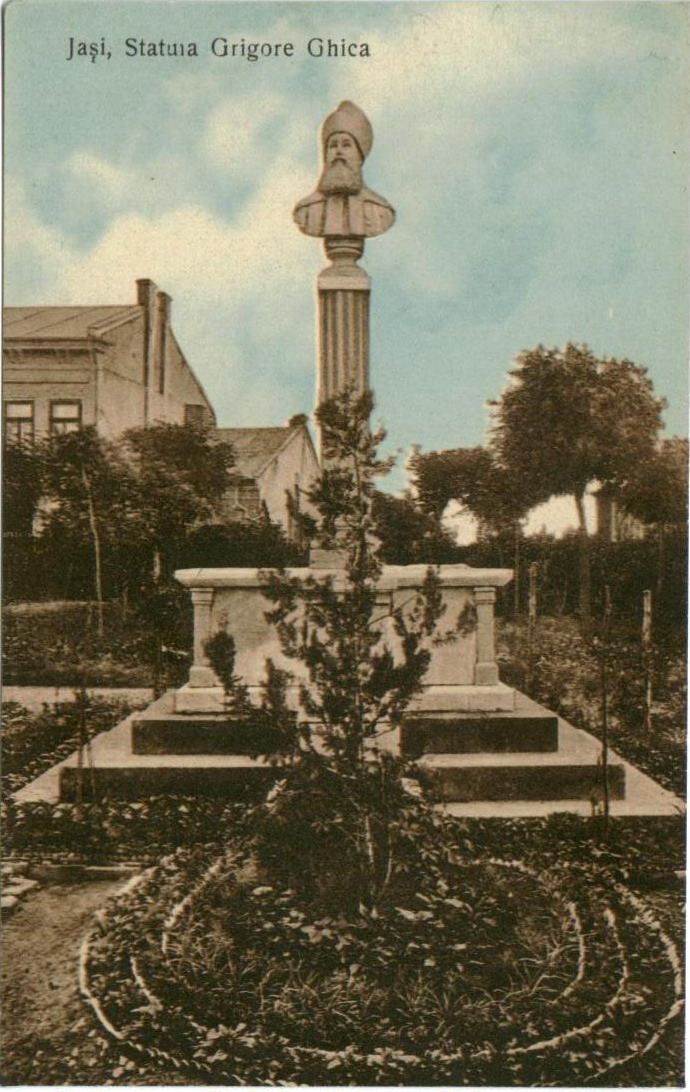
Bust of Grigore III Ghica of Moldavia, in Iași

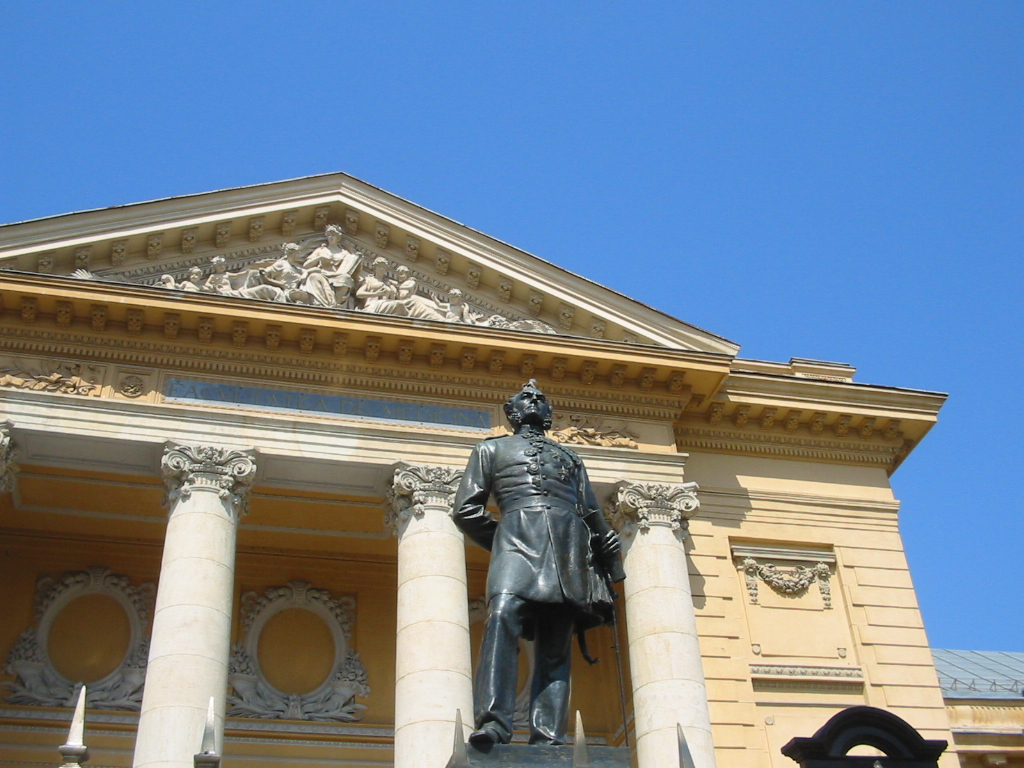
Statue of Carol Davila in front of the Carol Davila University of Medicine and Pharmacy.

Karl Storck (1826–1887) was a Hessian-born Romanian sculptor and art theorist, the most prominent Romanian sculptor of his time. His sons Carol Storck (1854–1926) and Frederic Storck (1872–1924), were also noted artists.

== Biography ==
Karl Storck was born on in Hanau, Grand Duchy of Hesse. Having been trained and working for a time as an engraver, he became sculptor only later.

In 1847, probably under pressure of economic upheaval amidst the events leading to the impending Revolution of 1848 in nearby Prussia, he traveled to Paris to study only to be driven from Paris by the French Revolution of 1848. after a brief return to Hanau, in 1849 Josef Flesh, also originally from Hanau offered him a job as in Bucharest (then part of the Ottoman Empire) as an engraver in Flesh's jewelry business. Two years later, he took a different position in Bucharest with Georg Fles, originally from Hamburg-Altona. Soon becoming an associate in Fles's firm, he created several sculptures in gypsum for the Military Hospital in Bucharest.

On April 23, 1852, he married Anna Clara Ihm (1852-1864), also originally from Hanau. They would have four children, only one of whom lived into adulthood: the sculptor Carol Storck, born in 1854 and originally named Johann Ludwig Karl Storck. That same year co-founded a German-oriented cultural society in Bucharest, and designed and executed two akroteria for the faç of the National Theatre; the theater was damaged beyond repair in the Luftwaffe bombardment of Bucharest on August 24, 1944 (see Bombing of Bucharest in World War II), but the akroteria survive in the collection of the Frederic and Cecilia Cuțescu-Storck Art Museum ("the Storck Museum").

Encountering another round of political turmoil in Bucharest after the end of the Crimean War, he and his family spent the years 1856–1857 in Vienna and in Munich where he trained as sculptor under Maximilian Wildmann and became a member of Munich's Association of Artists. However, he saw his economic prospects as being better in Bucharest.

With the 1859 unification of Moldavia and Wallachia, Bucharest became the ambitious capital of a new country, Romania, presenting opportunities for an ambitious sculptor. Storck established an atelier at Strada Fântânii 4 (now Strada Gen. Berthlot). He worked in a wide variety of sculptural media, ranging from wood to marble. Besides creating a variety of sculptural elements for several churches, Storck designed and, with his team (most notably, Paul Focșeneanu), sculpted the pediment for the main building of the University of Bucharest (1862), damaged beyond repair in the Allied air strikes of April 4, 1944, during World War II. That same year, he also participated in the decoration of Suțu Palace (now the Bucharest Municipal Museum) including a medallion portrait of Irinei Suțu.

Storck's wife Anna died April 6, 1864. Around that same time, he formed a connection to Italian sculptor Ippolito Lepri, providing him access to Carrara marble, his favored material for major works from that time forward. In 1865 he became the first professor of sculpture at the Fine Arts Academy in Bucharest.

Now at the heart of Romania's arts establishment, Storck was one of the organizers of what became the young country's first periodic art exhibition. He also obtained for the Fine Arts Academy a collection of casts of famous sculptures from Paris, so that his Romanian students could study these examples; a few years later, in 1868 and 1875, he would visit Italy and obtain similar casts. Also in 1865 he remarried, this time to his children's governess, Friederike Ameliie Olescher (1843-1915). Over the course of 20 years, they would have nine children, two of whom died as infants. The most notable of the seven who survived was Frederic Storck (1872-1942), who would go on to be one of the leading Romanian sculptors of the first half of the 20th century, and who would marry Cecilia Cuțescu-Storck, a prominent artist who became Europe's first female art professor.

In 1866, after a brief period of political turbulence, Romania became a kingdom under the Hohenzollern monarch Carol I. Storck's career continued apace. He moved his atelier to a larger space on what is now Calea Victoriei. (His previous studio had been only a few meters off of that major street.) The following year he received a commission for a maquette of the Curtea de Argeș Cathedral. Originally designed for the Paris Exposition of 1867, it can be seen in the Storck Museum. Also for that Exposition, he sculpted portraits in salt of Napoleon III and Carol I.

Storck teamed up in 1868 with a group of Austrian ceramicists to found what Liliana Vârban et al. say was the first factory to make terracotta tiles specifically for façades of houses, sold four years later to Anton Weigand. It is believed that tiles from this factory were used to decorate the home of artist Theodor Aman, now the Theodor Aman Museum.

In 1869, he received several commissions for monumental sculptures to beautify Bucharest. The most notable of these, a sculpture in Carrara marble at the hospital now known as Spitalul Clinic Colțea, was later lost—literally—during the widening of Bulevardul Ion C. Brătianu.

After another period of travel and study in Vienna and Florence, he returned to Bucharest, and in 1871 executed the double stairway in Carrara marble in the garden of the Stirbey Palace in Buftea, 20 kilometres (12 mi) from Bucharest; he executed this project in conjunction with a team from the atelier of Italian sculptor Filippo Grossi.

In the 1880s, he took on some of his most famous commissions. For most of these, he executed the original versions (typically in gypsum) but the monumental marble versions would be completed—some after his death—by his son Carol and by Carl Teutsch: the massive Carrara marble statue of Domnița Bălașa (commissioned 1881; unknown date of completion; the current marble statue is a reproduction dating only from 1992); the statue of Ana Davila (commissioned 1882, completed 1890); the staircase of honor, columns, and the balustrade of the balcony of the Romanian Athenaeum (commissioned 1883, completed 1888); the statue of Protopopul Teodor Economu (commissioned 1884); and the staircase of honor leading to the throne room of the Royal Palace (commissioned 1885; the Royal Palace from that era does not survive).

Another major work of Storck's later years is completely destroyed: monuments completed in 1885 in Rahova and Smârdan to commemorate victory in the Russo-Turkish War (1877–1878), considered by Romanians to be their War of Independence, were destroyed by advancing Bulgarian troops during World War I.

On January 27, 1887, Storck finally received the Romanian citizenship he had sought since 1883. However, he died barely two months later, on March 30, 1887. He is buried in the Evangelical Cemetery in Bucharest.

== Notable students ==
- Dimitrie Paciurea
- George Julian Zolnay

== List of works ==
=== Sculptures and monuments ===
- Domniţa Bălaşa, Spătarul Mihail Cantacuzino
- Statue of Carol Davila
- Minerva încununând artele și știința
- The iconostasis of Viforata Monastery (15th century)
- Bas-reliefs on the facade of the University of Bucharest (destroyed by the Allied bombing of Bucharest in World War II)
- Facade and interior of the Suțu Palace

=== Portraits ===
- Bust of Grigore III Ghica of Moldavia, in Iași
- Busts of Theodor Aman, Alexandru Ioan Cuza, Mihail Kogălniceanu, C. A. Rosetti, Elena Cuza

== See also ==
- Frederic and Cecilia Cuțescu-Storck Art Museum
