= 1887 in literature =

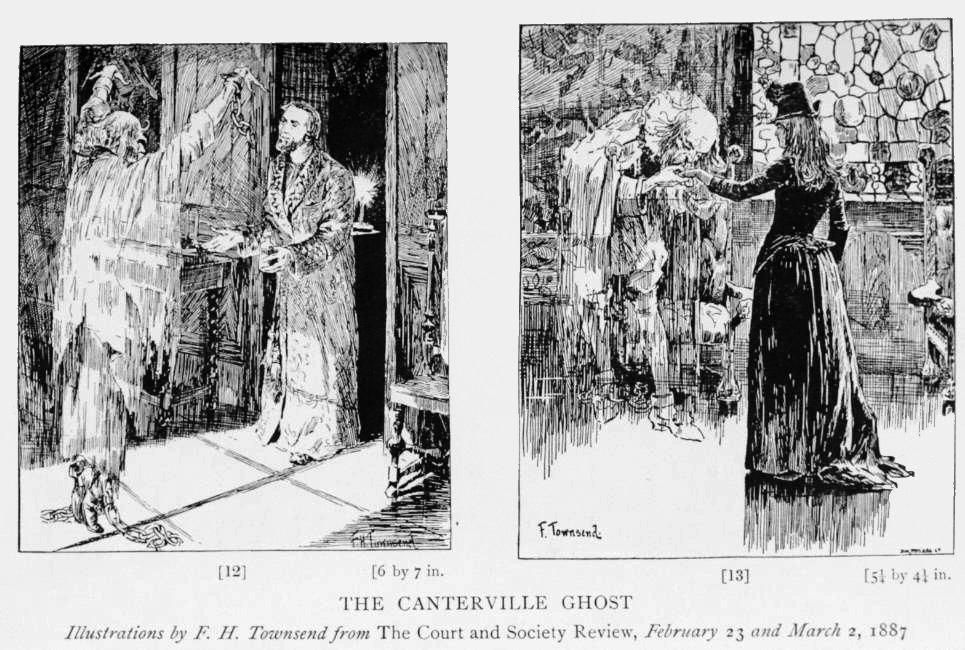

This article contains information about the literary events and publications of 1887.

== Events ==
- February – Oscar Wilde publishes "The Canterville Ghost", his first short story, in The Court and Society Review.
- March 30 – Théâtre Libre, established by André Antoine to promote naturalism in theatre, gives its first performances in Paris, originally as an amateur ensemble.
- April 22 – Syracuse University in New York State purchases the Ranke Library from the estate of historian Leopold von Ranke, outbidding the Prussian government.
- November – Arthur Conan Doyle's first detective novel, A Study in Scarlet, is published in Beeton's Christmas Annual by Ward Lock & Co. in London, introducing the consulting detective Sherlock Holmes and his friend and chronicler Dr. Watson (illustrated by D. H. Friston).
- December 5 – The Berne Convention for the Protection of Literary and Artistic Works (1886) comes into effect.
- December 15 – The Romanian literary magazine Revista Nouă is launched in Bucharest by Bogdan Petriceicu Hasdeu, who answers a request made by Ioan Bianu, Barbu Ștefănescu Delavrancea, Alexandru Vlahuță and others. The first issue, illustrated by George Demetrescu Mirea, hosts Delavrancea's Hagi Tudose and Petre Ispirescu's Sarea în bucate (a localized folkloric version of the King Leir myth).
- unknown dates
  - Futabatei Shimei writes and begins to publish The Drifting Cloud (浮雲, Ukigumo), the first modern novel in Japan.
  - George Hutchinson establishes Hutchinson & Co. as a publisher in London.
  - John Lane and Elkin Mathews set up in partnership under the name The Bodley Head in London, originally as antiquarian booksellers.

== New books ==
=== Fiction ===
- Herman Bang – Stucco (Stuk)
- Mary Elizabeth Braddon – Cut by the County
- Hall Caine – The Deemster
- Marie Corelli – Thelma
- F. Marion Crawford – Saracinesca
- José Maria de Eça de Queiroz – A Relíquia (The Relic)
- Barbu Ștefănescu Delavrancea – Hagi Tudose
- Anna Bowman Dodd – The Republic of the Future
- Arthur Conan Doyle – A Study in Scarlet
- Édouard Dujardin – Les Lauriers sont coupés (early example of stream of consciousness narrative mode)
- Benito Pérez Galdós – Fortunata y Jacinta (publication completed)
- Enrique Gaspar – El anacronópete (first fiction to feature a time machine)
- George Gissing – Thyrza
- H. Rider Haggard
  - Allan Quatermain
  - Jess
  - She
- Thomas Hardy – The Woodlanders
- W. H. Hudson – A Crystal Age
- Joris-Karl Huysmans – En rade (Becalmed; serialization concludes, book publication)
- Petre Ispirescu – Sarea în bucate
- Pierre Loti – Madame Chrysanthème
- Paolo Mantegazza – Testa
- William Morris – The Tables Turned, Or, Nupkins Awakened: A Socialist Interlude
- Appu Nedungadi – Kundalatha (കുന്ദലത)
- Bolesław Prus – The Doll (Lalka; serialization begins)
- José Rizal – Noli Me Tangere
- William James Roe (as Hudor Genone) – Bellona's Husband: A Romance
- Mark Rutherford (pseudonym of Hale White) – Revolution in Tanner's Lane
- Futabatei Shimei – The Drifting Cloud
- August Strindberg – The People of Hemsö (Hemsöborna)
- Jules Verne
  - The Flight to France (Le Chemin de France)
  - Texar's Revenge, or, North Against South (Nord contre Sud)
- Émile Zola – La Terre (The Earth)

=== Children and young people ===
- Palmer Cox – The Brownies, Their Book
- Robert Louis Stevenson – The Merry Men and Other Tales and Fables

=== Drama ===
- Anton Chekhov – Ivanov
- Arthur Wing Pinero – Dandy Dick
- Victorien Sardou – La Tosca
- August Strindberg – The Father
- Thomas Russell Sullivan – Dr. Jekyll and Mr. Hyde (adapted from 1886 Robert Louis Stevenson novella Strange Case of Dr Jekyll and Mr Hyde)

=== Non-fiction ===
- Mikhail Bakunin – God and the State
- Hall Caine – Life of Samuel Taylor Coleridge
- Charles Darwin (died 1882) – The Autobiography of Charles Darwin
- Julius Dresser – The True History of Mental Science
- Friedrich Engels (translated by Florence Kelley) – The Condition of the Working Class in England in 1844 (first English language edition)
- George William Foote – Royal Paupers: a radical's contribution to the Jubilee
- Franz Hartmann – The Life of Philippus Theophrastus Bombast of Hohenheim, better known by the name of Paracelsus, and the substance of his teachings
- David MacGibbon and Thomas Ross – The Castellated and Domestic Architecture of Scotland
- Samuel Liddell MacGregor Mathers – The Kabbalah Unveiled
- Friedrich Nietzsche – On the Genealogy of Morality
- Marius Nygaard, Jan Johanssen and Emil Schreiner – Latinsk Ordbog
- E. J. Richmond – Woman, First and Last, and What She has Done
- A. E. Waite – The Real History of the Rosicrucians
- Mary Allen West – Childhood: Its Care and Culture
- L. L. Zamenhof – Unua Libro

== Births ==
- January 2 – Dmitrii Milev, Soviet Moldovan shorty story writer and critic (died 1937)
- January 7 – Oskar Luts, Estonian author and playwright (died 1953)
- January 10 – Robinson Jeffers, American poet (died 1962)
- January 22 – Helen Hoyt, American poet (died 1972)
- February 1 – Charles Nordhoff, English-born author (died 1947)
- February 3 – Georg Trakl, Austrian poet (died of overdose 1914)
- February 4 – Sheila Kaye-Smith, English writer (died 1955)
- February 11 – John van Melle, South African writer (died 1953)
- February 13 – Géza Csáth, Hungarian writer, and psychiatrist (died 1919)
- February 20 – Carl Ebert, German theatre and opera director (died 1980)
- March 9 – Ion Buzdugan, Romanian poet and political figure (died 1967)
- March 14 – Sylvia Beach (Nancy Woodbridge Beach), American publisher and memoirist (died 1962)
- May 15 – Edwin Muir, Scottish poet and translator (died 1959)
- May 31 – Saint-John Perse, French diplomat, writer and Nobel Prize laureate (died 1975)
- June 2 – Orrick Glenday Johns, American poet and playwright (died 1946)
- June 25 – George Abbott, American playwright, director and screenwriter (died 1995)
- July 1 – Amber Reeves, New Zealand-born English scholar, feminist and novelist (died 1981)
- July 6 – Walter Flex, German war writer (died 1917)
- August 3 – Rupert Brooke, English poet (died 1915)
- August 17 – Marcus Garvey, African American publisher, entrepreneur and Pan Africanist (died 1940)
- August 28 – István Kühár, Prekmurje Slovene poet, writer and politician (died 1922)
- September 1 – Blaise Cendrars (Frédéric-Louis Sauser), Swiss-born French writer (died 1961)
- September 8 – Constantin Beldie, Romanian literary promoter and memoirist (died 1954)
- September 26 – Edwin Keppel Bennett, British writer (died 1958)
- October 1 – Barbu Nemțeanu, Romanian poet and translator (died 1919)
- October 22 – John Reed, American journalist and poet (died 1920)
- November 10 – Arnold Zweig, German novelist (died 1968)
- December 15 – A. de Herz, Romanian playwright and journalist (died 1936)

== Deaths ==
- February 10 – Mrs Henry Wood (Ellen Wood), English novelist (born 1814)
- February 11 – François Laurent, Belgian historian (born 1810)
- February 19 – Multatuli (Eduard Douwes Dekker), Dutch-born writer (born 1820)
- February 21 – Elizabeth Caroline Gray, historian and travel author (born 1800)
- March 20 – Pavel Annenkov, Russian critic and memoirist (born 1813)
- April 23 – John Ceiriog Hughes, Welsh poet and folk song collector (born 1832)
- May 4 – William Murdoch, Scottish-born Canadian poet (born 1823)
- May 5 – James Grant, Scottish novelist and historian (born 1822)
- August 20 – Jules Laforgue, French poet (born 1860)
- August 25 – Emma Jane Guyton (Worboise), English novelist and magazine editor (born 1825)
- September 11 - Charles Lawrence Young, English playwright and baronet (born 1839)
- September 14 – Friedrich Theodor Vischer, German novelist, poet, playwright and art theorist (born 1807)
- September 27 – Mikalojus Akelaitis, Lithuanian writer, linguist and publicist (born 1829)
- October 12 – Dinah Craik, English novelist and poet (born 1826)
- November 2 – Alfred Domett, English-born New Zealand poet and politician (born 1811)
- November 19 – Emma Lazarus, American poet (born 1849)
- December 5 – Eliza Roxcy Snow, American poet (born 1804)
