= Alexandru Bogdan-Pitești =

Poet, essayist, and art and literary critic (1870–1922)

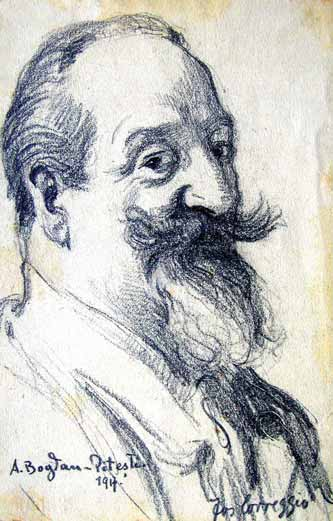
- Anonymous sketch of Bogdan-Pitești, 1917 (signed Correggio)
- Born: June 13, 1870; Pitești, Principality of Romania
- Died: May 12, 1922 (aged 51); Bucharest, Kingdom of Romania
- Occupations: poet, journalist, political activist, businessman, visual artist
- Writing career
- Pen name: Ion Doican, Ion Duican, Al. Dodan
- Period: 1880s–1922
- Genres: essay, lyric poetry, prose poetry
- Subjects: art criticism, literary criticism
- Movements: Symbolism; Modernism

Alexandru Bogdan-Pitești (Romanian pronunciation: [alekˈsandru boɡˈdan piˈteʃtʲ]; born Alexandru Bogdan, also known as Ion Doican, Ion Duican and Al. Dodan; June 13, 1870 – May 12, 1922) was a Romanian Symbolist poet, essayist, and art and literary critic, who was also known as a journalist and left-wing political agitator. A wealthy landowner, he invested his fortune in patronage and art collecting, becoming one of the main local promoters of modern art, and a sponsor of the Romanian Symbolist movement. Together with other Post-Impressionist and Symbolist cultural figures, Bogdan-Pitești established Societatea Ileana, which was one of the first Romanian associations dedicated to promoting the avant-garde and independent art. He was also noted for his friendship with the writers Joris-Karl Huysmans, Alexandru Macedonski, Tudor Arghezi and Mateiu Caragiale, as well as for sponsoring, among others, the painters Ștefan Luchian, Constantin Artachino and Nicolae Vermont. In addition to his literary and political activities, Alexandru Bogdan-Pitești was himself a painter and graphic artist.

Much of Bogdan-Pitești's controversial political career, inaugurated by his support for anarchism, was dedicated to activism and support for revolution. He also had an interest in the occult, and maintained close contacts with Joséphin "Sâr" Péladan—sponsoring Péladan's journey to Bucharest (1898). He was detained by the authorities at various intervals, including an arrest for sedition during the 1899 election, and was later found guilty of having blackmailed the banker Aristide Blank. Late in his life, he led Seara, a Germanophile daily, as well as a literary and political circle which came to oppose Romania's entry into World War I on the Entente Powers' side. He was arrested one final time upon the end of the war, by which time he had become the object of public hatred. The enduring mysteries and contradictions of Bogdan-Pitești's career have since drawn interest from several generations of art and literary historians.

== Biography ==
=== Early life and anarchism ===
A native of Pitești, Alexandru Bogdan-Pitești was the son of a landowner from Olt, and, on his father's side, the descendant of immigrants from the Epirote area of Ioannina, whose ethnicity was either Aromanian or Albanian. His father became a local leader of the Conservative Party. His mother was a boyaress, and, as art collector and memoirist Krikor Zambaccian recounted, may have been a descendant of the Balotescu boyar clan. Bogdan-Pitești also had a sister, Elena Constanța Bogdan; both she and her mother reportedly survived his death. As one of his eccentricities, Bogdan-Pitești encouraged the—unsustainable—rumor that he was a direct descendant of an ancient Wallachian ruling house, the Basarab Princes.

According to at least one account, Bogdan-Pitești was educated in Geneva, at a local Catholic institution. Raised in the Romanian Orthodox faith, he converted to Catholicism in his twenties, but was no longer a practicing Catholic by the time of his death. He supposedly attended medical school at the University of Montpellier, without ever graduating, and afterwards left to join the bohemian milieu of Paris. He may have enrolled at the University of Paris, studying Law and Letters, but probably withdrew after a short while. Art historian Sanda Miller recounts that Bogdan-Pitești attended the École des Beaux-Arts in the French capital, but that he was ultimately expelled. Other sources express doubt that the Romanian aristocrat was ever affiliated with any university or college, in either France or Switzerland.

According to literary historian Tudor Vianu, at that stage, the young man began associating with the criminal underworld. He soon established a connection with the French anarchist circles, while also associating with a branch of the growing Symbolist movement. Like others in his generation, he may have been driven by a desire for shocking and morbid experiences. According to art historian Theodor Enescu, these ranged from erotic experimentation to the "boisterous shivers of anarchism", and from criminal enterprise to decadent poetry. Bogdan-Pitești was a presence in the anarchist group of Auguste Vaillant (later guillotined for plotting a terrorist coup), and was possibly acquainted with some of the more prestigious anarchist intellectuals: Élisée Reclus, Laurent Tailhade and (especially influential on him) Félix Fénéon.

Reports exist that Bogdan-Pitești's politics were already a merger of opposite or hardly compatible doctrines. He respected Catholicism and Judaism as the most elevated religious cultures, rejected Orthodoxy, atheism and communism as ideologies for the mediocre, and depicted himself as a Catholic anarchist. He believed in craniometry, and took scientific racism at face value. At some stage during the late 1880s, Bogdan-Pitești became a supporter of General Boulanger, who attempted to gain power in France with support from the Orléanist, Bonapartist and socialist camps; he reputedly befriended the prominent Boulangist and Romantic nationalist thinker Maurice Barrès.

In parallel, he himself became a representative of literary and artistic Symbolism, and supposedly maintained contacts with authors such as Joris-Karl Huysmans, Maurice Maeterlinck, Octave Mirbeau, Jean Moréas, and Paul Verlaine. Another influence on him was the occultist and novelist Joséphin Péladan, whose Rosicrucian salon he attended several times.

Bogdan-Pitești debuted as a writer and political essayist. It was later reported, but not confirmed, that he published his pieces in newspapers and magazines of diverse backgrounds—Le Figaro, Le Gaulois, Gil Blas, L'Intransigeant and La Libre Parole among them. He also claimed to have played a part in staging the first Genevan showing of Richard Wagner's Die Walküre.

=== Salonul Independenților ===
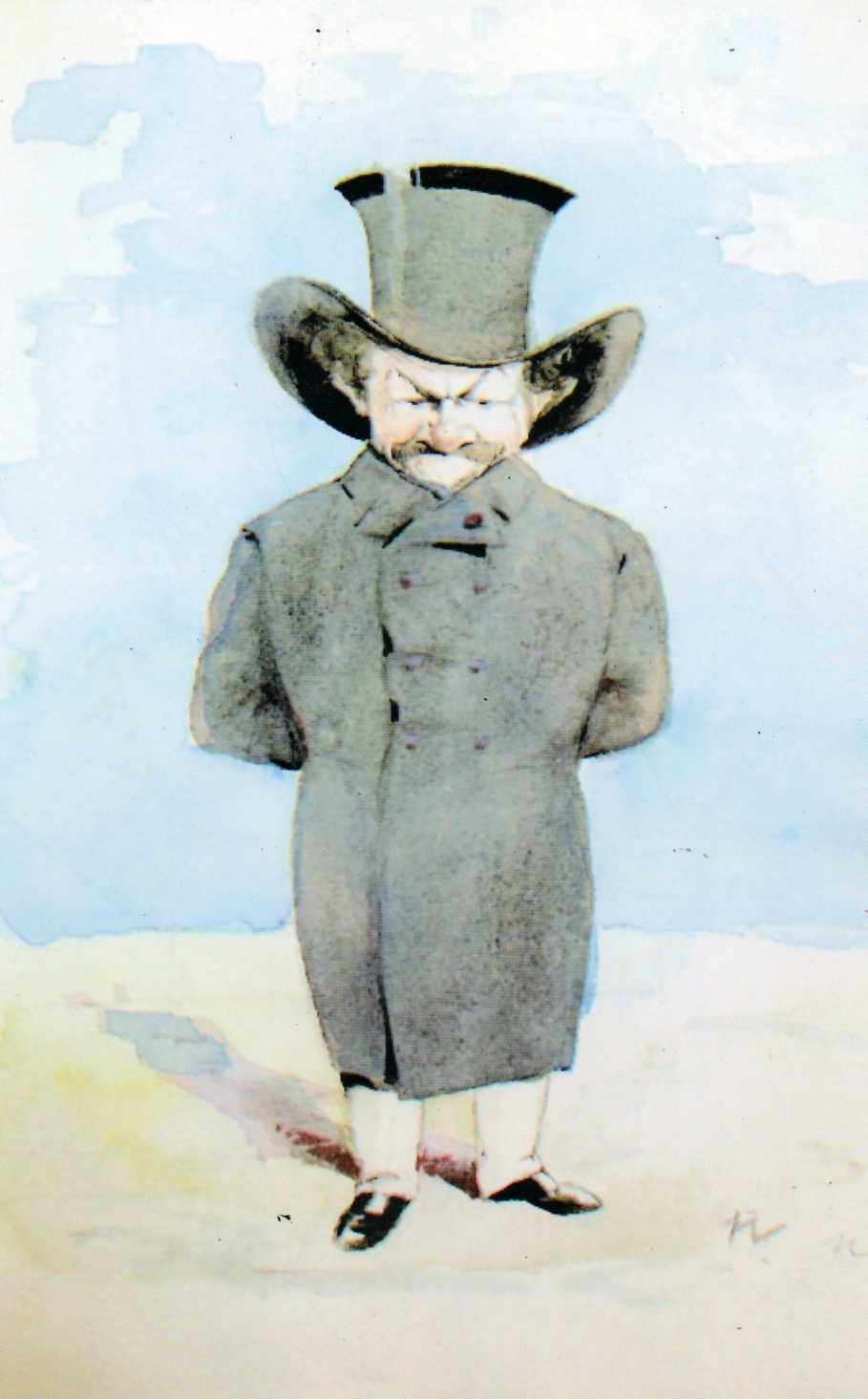
Nicolae Petrescu-Găină's caricature of C. I. Stăncescu, original watercolor

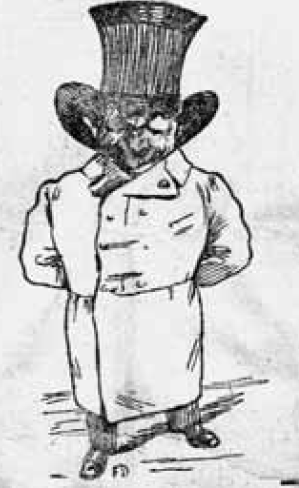
The same image, as republished by Adevărul

Placed under surveillance due to his involvement in revolutionary politics by 1894, Alexandru Bogdan-Pitești was eventually expelled from France, despite Huysmans' intervention in his favor. Reputedly, the deportation document identified him as a "threat to public order". One urban legend recounts that Bogdan-Pitești was present at Vaillant's public execution and leaned over to kiss Vaillant's mangled body, which both disgusted and alarmed the judicial establishment. Zambaccian suggests that the decision to deport the Romanian provocateur was not politically motivated. He writes that Bogdan-Pitești had exhausted the patience of French authorities by trafficking in stolen bicycles.

From France, Bogdan-Pitești had contemplated the idea of revolutionizing Romanian art, and, upon his arrival to Bucharest, began organizing artists' reunions at the Kübler and Fialkowski coffeehouses. In 1896, with Post-Impressionist artists Constantin Artachino, Ștefan Luchian and Nicolae Vermont, he founded Salonul Independenților, the Romanian replica of the French Société des Artistes Indépendants. They were soon joined by painter Nicolae Grant and caricaturist Nicolae Petrescu-Găină.

The exhibits featured some of Alexandru Bogdan-Pitești's own drawings, which he intended to use as illustrations for his book of French-language poems, Sensations internes ("Internal Sensations"). He planned for his art movement to reach outside Romania, and, also in 1896, financed an international exhibition of independent and avant-garde artists. Salonul was known for its public protest against academic art: located just outside the Romanian Athenaeum building (a main venue for local Neoclassicism), it put up Petrescu Găină's huge caricature of academic artist C. I. Stăncescu, and flew a red flag next to it. This call to socialist rebellion attracted public attention, and the flag was urgently taken down by agents of the Romanian Police. The subsequent exhibitions were viewed with sympathy by a section of the press, including the leftist newspaper Adevărul. It republished pieces ridiculing Stăncescu in his role of official curator, and made favorable comments on all of the Salonul Independenților artists. Noting the leader's own anarchist past, Adevărul art columnist Gal wrote: "Bogdan has all the qualities and flaws of a sincere French revolutionary, but one who is not entirely clear and scientific. He has an extraordinary love for all things independent and hates to the point of excess all sectarian people, and all schools." In June 1896, the group of "secessionists" was commissioned to decorate Bragadiru Garden, where Romania's press held its annual fair. The show, attended by Bogdan-Pitești, prominently featured Stăncescu's caricature at the entrance.

Despite rhetoric, the new art club was not entirely opposed to tradition, and occasionally appealed to it as a basis for cultural reconstruction. Salonul boasted among its honorary members the lionized oil painter Nicolae Grigorescu, who had trained with the Barbizon school. Bogdan-Pitești was especially fond of Luchian's work, and, in an 1896 article for the cultural magazine Revista Orientală, spoke of him as "an admirable colorist", a "free spirit", and a purveyor of "revolutionary ideas". He boosted Luchian's self-confidence, urging him to apply his talents to illustrating "an idea", and was entirely adverse to Grigorescu's traditionalist manner. Luchian still used Grigorescu as a source of inspiration in his own work, prompting scholars to argue that Grigorescu's Salonul Independenților reception was Bogdan-Pitești's unwilling concession to his star protégé.

=== Literatorul, Bronzes, Ileana ===
Bogdan-Pitești was by then an inspiration for the blooming Romanian Symbolist movement. In effect, he was the first Romanian expert on the work of Symbolist celebrities like Odilon Redon, Gustave Moreau, and (his favorite) Alexandre Séon. He soon became a contributor to Literatorul, a Symbolist magazine, and was close friends with its founder, Alexandru Macedonski. In 1897, he was chosen by the latter to edit and promote his book of French-language poems, Bronzes. In the end, Bogdan-Pitești provided the funds needed for Bronzes to be published in Paris. It came out with an introductory note, in which Bogdan-Pitești favorably compared Macedonski with arch-rival Mihai Eminescu. In more general terms, the preface showed Bogdan-Pitești as an unyielding Francophile, who reported with alarm that Romania risked being seduced and then engulfed by German culture. Himself a disciple of Macedonski, T. Vianu comments that Bogdan-Pitești was probably unsuited for the task of introducing Bronzes, and that, despite expectations, the volume failed to impress the French public. He notes the virtually complete lack of press reviews—with the notable exception of a May 1898 article in Mercure de France, written by the Symbolist-anarchist Pierre Quillard.

Later in 1898, back in Romania, Bogdan-Pitești and the other Salonul Independenților initiators joined up with author Ioan Bacalbașa and architect Ștefan Ciocâlteu. This diverse group established Societatea Ileana, an association dedicated to supporting innovative artists. Its steering committee was later joined by the intellectual and political figures Constantin Rădulescu-Motru, Nicolae Xenopol, and Nicolae Filipescu, as well as by the painter Jean Alexandru Steriadi. The society took up the effort to uproot against academic salons, organizing a large and provocative exhibit in 1898, and, at the height of its popularity, enlisted in its ranks some 300 people. Despite such consolidation, various Ileana affiliates were not entirely committed to the cause, and never severed their links with Stănescu's official section.

The new circle held meetings in a Brezoianu Street studio which was also its patron's home. Its feminine name Ileana was probably a borrowing from Romanian folklore, and may reference the fairy tale character Ileana Cosânzeana. The group's press organ, also known as Ileana, was edited by Bacalbașa and illustrated by Luchian. Described by Vianu as a "refined art magazine", it is also considered the first one of its kind in Romania.

In parallel, Bogdan-Pitești began frequenting the country's first socialist pressure group, the Romanian Social Democratic Workers' Party (PSDMR), and attending meetings between Bucharest workers. The PSDMR denounced him as an agent provocateur of the Conservative Party, and he stood accused of breaking the party into tolerant and antisemitic halves.

=== Péladan's visit ===
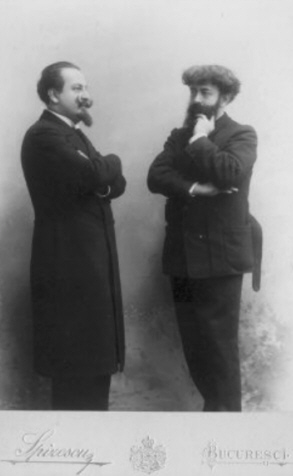
Photograph of Bogdan-Pitești (left) and Joséphin Péladan, during the latter's visit to Bucharest

As head of Ileana, Bogdan-Pitești organized Joséphin Péladan's 1898 visit to Bucharest. It was a much-publicized event, which attracted the attention of high society and received ample coverage in the press; Bogdan-Pitești accompanied Péladan on visits to various Bucharest landmarks, including the Athenaeum, the Chamber of Deputies, the Orthodox Metropolitan and Domnița Bălașa churches, as well as the Roman Catholic Saint Joseph Cathedral. Among the politicians who attended the ceremonies were Nicolae Filipescu, Constantin Dissescu, Take Ionescu, Ioan Lahovary, and Constantin C. Arion; prominent intellectuals (Barbu Ștefănescu Delavrancea, Rădulescu-Motru etc.) were in the audience.

Péladan agreed to lecture in front of Societatea Ileana at the Atheneum, and his subject of choice was The Genius of the Latin Race. His mystical doctrine was received with much skepticism and amusement by the Romanian literary chroniclers. The visit then turned to scandal: Péladan issued a call for all Romanians to embrace Catholicism, and left the country on pain of being deported.

Various commentators are entirely dismissive of the visit and its importance. Th. Enescu describes its impact as "amazing", since Péladan was merely an "unusual [funambulesc in the original] representative of French culture". He also proposes that the reception, with its "noisy" and "exacerbated" fanfare, shows the "complexes of a provincial culture, confronted with the promiscuous exorbitance of a great culture". This assessment is quoted by literary historian Paul Cernat, who also notes Péladan's "rather modest value" should not have allowed such reactions. Cernat concedes that the Péladan visit was important for promoting new cultural trends, specifically the notions of art for art's sake and decadence, even though this was done "through the means of politics [italics in the original]".

Cultural historian Angelo Mitchievici proposes that, modelling himself on Péladan, Bogdan-Pitești was becoming the "spinmeister" of oriental Symbolism. As Ion Doican (or Duican), he contributed to Ileana essays praising various contemporary painters: Arthur Verona, George Demetrescu Mirea, and, most of all, Luchian. Ileana only published a few issues before closing down in 1901. Bogdan-Pitești's collaborator Bacalbașa, known by then as a dramatist, also attended, but drifted away from the group in 1900, giving up his position as editor of Ileana. A similar split occurred between Luchian and his patron, sparked when Bogdan-Pitești made some favorable comments on Stăncescu's work, and probably took several years to mend. Over that decade, Bogdan-Pitești had also become one of Literatorul's main financial backers.

Writing in 1910, at a time when Romanian art came to be me more familiar with new artistic trends (including Cubism and Fauvism, both advocated locally by art critic Theodor Cornel), Alexandru Bogdan-Pitești adapted his discourse to the new trends. The art patron, who probably exercised considerable influence over Cornel, publicly complained that, instead of keeping up with the times, his fellow Romanian intellectuals still regarded Impressionism as the ultimate novelty. On the occasion, he hailed the Post-Impressionist French artists Paul Gauguin and Paul Cézanne as the models to follow. He was actively seeking to mend his split with Luchian, and, although he called the painter "inconsistent", again stated that he found him to be Romania's best young artist.

=== Slatina revolt and Vlaici colony ===
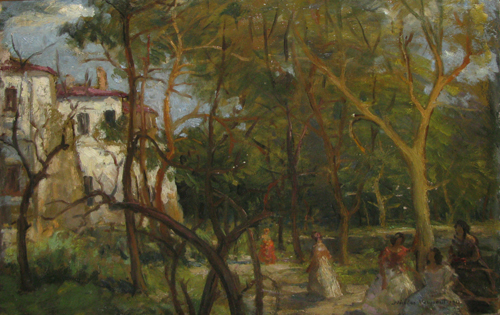
Nicolae Vermont's Vara la conac ("Summer at the Manor"), a 1912 depiction of Bogdan-Pitești's estate

After his return to Romania, Alexandru Bogdan-Pitești was still noted for his political activities, although these shifted to the background during his Ileana years. According to some reports, he spent some of his free time touring the countryside, rallying up peasants, inciting them to rebel, and mapping out a radical land reform. During the general election of 1899, he ran for a deputy seat in both Olt and Ilfov, without registering success. There was confusion as to Bogdan-Pitești's political affiliation. He was known as "the peasants' candidate", but both sides of the Romanian two-party system, the National Liberal Party and the Conservative group, accused the other of secretly supporting his bid.

During such campaigns, he is said to have misled his voters into believing that he was a son of the deposed Domnitor Alexandru Ioan Cuza, and therefore a natural champion of land reform. His activity in Olt is credited with having sparked some violent incidents: in at least one account, he instigated the peasants of Slatina area to riot, and their revolt was only suppressed with use of force. Others however claim that the Romanian Land Forces randomly shot at, then charged upon, the peaceful mass of demonstrators, killing at least 35 of them.

The Slatina crisis reverberated in the capital and posed problems for the Conservative cabinet of Gheorghe Grigore Cantacuzino. Reportedly, both the Minister of Agriculture Nicolae Fleva and the Minister of Justice Dissescu were ready to hand in their resignations. Bogdan-Pitești himself was arrested for sedition, but soon after checked himself into Filantropia Hospital. He averted sentencing when the prosecutors were unable to conclusively prove this involvement.

Overall, Bogdan-Pitești claimed to have been held in judicial custody for some forty separate incidents, stressing that all these convictions were owed to political crimes—while reporting this statement, T. Vianu noted that at least some should in fact be considered punishments for various misdemeanors. In time, the anarchist boyar had also come to be known as an inveterate criminal and jailbird, which attracted him the disparaging moniker Bogdan-Văcărești (after Văcărești Prison in Bucharest). Others twisted his birth name into the parodic Bogdan-Ciupești (from a ciupi, "to gyp").

Bogdan-Pitești consolidated his own estate when he inherited a manor in Vlaici village (part of Colonești). It was, beginning in 1908, the center of his activities and home to his sizable art collection, as well as one of the first locations in Romania acting as a summer camp for painters and sculptors. The events he planned were attended by the Ileana regulars, and, in time, attracted virtually all other major en plein air painters of the day: Nicolae Dărăscu, Ștefan Dimitrescu, Iosif Iser, M. H. Maxy, Theodor Pallady, Camil Ressu.

In his recollections from that period, writer Victor Eftimiu suggested that the relationship was not entirely harmonious: "Camil Ressu, like other young unknown painters, found a lot of support and encouragement with Bogdan-Pitești. Truth be told, the maecenate was rather thrifty, it profited from the needs of the debuting and impoverished artist. But without it things would've been much worse, since others did not even offer as much". He also argued that, contrary to speculation about his wealth, Bogdan-Pitești "maybe paid up so little because that is all he had to spare". Reputedly, the Ileana boss was losing a fortune on maintaining the Vlaici manor, surrounded as it was by barren land.

=== Știrbey-Vodă circle ===
Circa 1908, the Bogdan-Pitești villa on Bucharest's Știrbey-Vodă Street (near the Cișmigiu Gardens) began hosting regular gatherings of intellectuals. Among those who attended in successive stages were the writers Macedonski, Eftimiu, Tudor Arghezi, Mateiu Caragiale, Benjamin Fondane, Gala Galaction, George Bacovia, Ion Minulescu, Claudia Millian, N. D. Cocea, Ion Vinea, F. Brunea-Fox, Eugeniu Ștefănescu-Est, A. de Herz, Ion Călugăru, and Adrian Maniu. It also hosted the artists Luchian, Artachino, Verona, Maxy, Iser, Steriadi, Dimitrescu, Pallady, Ressu, Dărăscu, Nina Arbore, Constantin Brâncuși, Constantin Medrea, Dimitrie Paciurea, Maria Ciurdea Steurer, Oscar Han, Nicolae Tonitza, Ion Theodorescu-Sion, Friedrich Storck and Cecilia Cuțescu-Storck, as well as Abgar Baltazar, Alexandru Brătășanu, Alexandru Poitevin-Skeletti, George Demetrescu Mirea, Rodica Maniu, and Marcel Janco. Also in 1908, following Iser's proposal, Bogdan-Pitești sponsored a Bucharest exhibit showcasing works by the renowned European painters Demetrios Galanis, Jean-Louis Forain and André Derain.

After 1910, his patronage took on new forms. Literary critic Șerban Cioculescu notes that, at least initially, his relationship with Mateiu Caragiale included a financial aspect, since Bogdan-Pitești inviting the destitute poet to dinner and provided him with funds. He was also granting lodging and material to various disadvantaged painters, as reported by his close friend Arghezi, and took a special interest in promoting the poetry of Ștefan Petică (as well as that of Arghezi himself). Arghezi claimed that such influence and moral support were also "decisive" in at least one other case, that of Luchian. In his memoir of the period, linguist Alexandru Rosetti mentioned that, on a daily basis, Bogdan-Pitești invited "over a dozen artists" for supper at his home.

Bogdan-Pitești's renewed his attacks on the Orthodox Church. Paul Cernat sees them as efforts to fabricate a religious alternative to the Orthodox mainstream, included in the larger phenomenon that was Symbolist cosmopolitanism. However, Galaction, who was to end his life as an Orthodox priest, recorded that the Știrbey-Vodă circle accommodated people of very diverse backgrounds. At one time, they included, alongside Galaction himself, the Roman Catholic priest Carol Auner, the Protestant sculptor Storck, and the anarchist activist Panait Mușoiu. According to Cernat, Bogdan-Pitești's bohemian society also grouped people believed associated with the illegal activities, and was noted for its "libertine" atmosphere. Galaction backed such interpretations, writing that the salon was also home to "a dozen con artists and prostitutes." The atmosphere was colloquial and free-spirited, to the point of being demeaning: story goes that the artists and writers were sometimes told licentious jokes, or had to endure grotesque farces.

A dandy, Alexandru Bogdan-Pitești himself led a life of luxury, marked by excess, and had by then become a drug addict. He was a proud homosexual (or bisexual), which did not prevent him from keeping as his concubine a younger woman, commonly referred to as Domnica ("Little Lady") or Mica ("Little One"). Born Alexandra Colanoski, she was born in 1894 to Romanian Poles from Bessarabia, and, according to memoirist Constantin Beldie, had previously been a prostitute at a nightclub.

Herself a libertine, Domnica was described by researchers as an androgynous or cross-dressing presence. To other members of the Știrbey-Vodă circle, painter-designer Alexandru Brătășanu was introduced as Bogdan-Pitești's male lover. Theirs was a "degenerate" affair, according to Oscar Han; Han also quotes Bogdan-Pitești's admiration for the male body, including male genitalia, as the only physical beauties which could withstand time.

=== Cantacuzino Conservative and Seara ===
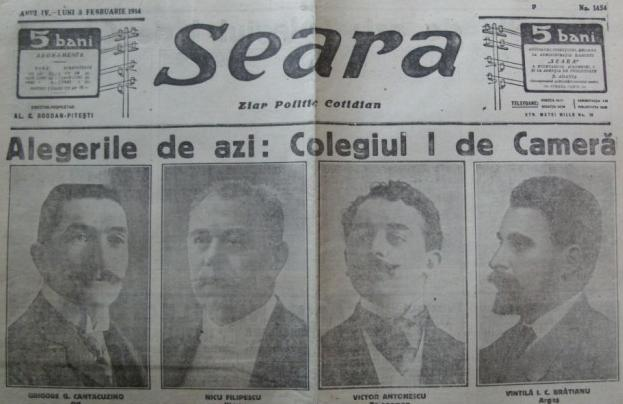
Title page of Seara, with portraits of candidates in the 1914 election; Grigore Gheorghe Cantacuzino's is first on the left

Around 1912, Alexandru Bogdan-Pitești's political influence was on the rise. He had begun associating with an inner faction of the Conservative Party, which had as its leader Grigore Gheorghe Cantacuzino, the Mayor of Bucharest. Afterward, Bogdan-Pitești became the publisher of Seara, but was reportedly a front for Cantacuzino, who used him to test the impact of his agenda on the Romanian public. Seara's main negative campaign at the time focused on Take Ionescu and his Conservative-Democrats, who, to Cantacuzino's displeasure, had been co-opted in government by the other mainstream Conservatives. The paper published gossip columns and lampoons having Ionescu, Alexandru Bădărău and Nicolae Titulescu for their main targets.

By then, like many "Germanophile" Conservatives, Bogdan-Pitești had come to support the Romanian Kingdom's alliance with the German Empire and Austria-Hungary. This view was popularized by means of his literary club, and support for the Central Powers was also voiced by Arghezi at Seara. In September 1914, a German consortium purchased the paper (together with Cantacuzino's other gazette, Minerva), and Bogdan-Pitești was kept on as a simple columnist. Throughout the interval, Bogdan-Pitești was himself an outspoken Germanophile. His circle, which was already hostile to the National Liberal cabinet of Ion I. C. Brătianu, welcomed the diverse groups who were alarmed by Romania's probable entry into the war: the pro-German Conservatives, the supporters of proletarian internationalism, and the committed pacifists. The artistic clientele was also represented in the Germanophile group at large, but, Cernat's writes, did so for sheer dependency rather than actual convictions.

Suspicions soon arose that Bogdan-Pitești had become a veritable agent of influence. According to Zambaccian, it was Bogdan-Pitești who actually dropped a hint that his support for Germany was a lucrative employment. Through various notes in scattered diaries, most of which have been lost, Caragiale reputedly accused Bogdan-Pitești taking Germany's money to promote her interests in Romania, and to assist her foreign propaganda effort. Such assessments, like Caragiale's allegation that Bogdan-Pitești was not knowledgeable in art, reflected conflicts between the two figures, and their overall reliability remains doubtful. It is however possible that Caragiale himself borrowed, and never returned, some 10,000 lei, siphoned out of the German propaganda funds by Bogdan-Pitești.

=== Libertatea and propaganda wars ===
Between October 1915 and June 1916, Bogdan-Pitești managed another press venue, Libertatea ("Freedom"). Its political director was retired statesman Nicolae Fleva, later replaced by Arghezi. In February 1916, Galaction and Arghezi launched Cronica, another review with a pro-German agenda, and which may itself have been published with discreet assistance from Bogdan-Pitești. Although Bogdan-Pitești, Domnica and Caragiale paid a mysterious visit to Berlin in early 1916, they were never listed as foreign spies by Siguranța Statului counter-intelligence. Bogdan-Pitești's name then surfaced in a February 1916 conversation between German statesman Matthias Erzberger and Raymund Netzhammer, the Catholic Archbishop of Bucharest. Erzberger asked if the Vlaici landowner could ever help advance the Germanophile cause; the Archbishop, a loyal German subject, replied that Bogdan-Pitești was unreliable. Allegations later surfaced that Bogdan-Pitești was one of the men receiving payoffs from the German spy Albert E. Günther, manager of Steaua Română company. The dossier attesting this was lost, but secondary sources have it that Bogdan-Pitești alone received 840,000 lei from Günther's hands.

The contributors to Seara and Libertatea were, in general, outspoken social and cultural critics, with diverse grievances against the establishment. Historian Lucian Boia argues that, even though Bogdan-Pitești was on the German payroll, his switch from the Francophiles could have been a genuine form of conservatism. Boia thus notes that Seara was supportive of the Central Powers from the 1914 build-up to the war, that is even before Cantacuzino had come to decide which side he liked best. The core group of Seara men included socialists of various hues: Arghezi, who claimed that Serbian nationalism was the spark of the war; Felix Aderca, who depicted the German Empire as the more progressive belligerent; and Rodion, who rendered the complains of Germanophile intellectuals from Moldavia. Others were left-wing refugees from the Russian Empire, who wanted Romania to join the Central Powers and help liberate Bessarabia: Alexis Nour, from the Poporanist faction, and the old anarchist Zamfir Arbore. Seara was also a platform for some disgruntled Romanians from Transylvania region, a Romanian irredenta under Austro-Hungarian rule. They included a mainstream Conservative commentator, Ilie Bărbulescu, who advised Romanians not to focus on Transylvania, and prioritized action against the Russians. Two distinct voices were those of poet Dumitru Karnabatt, who identified the Entente Powers with Pan-Slavism or British imperialism; and Ion Gorun, the Transylvanian writer and Habsburg loyalist. Beyond politics, Seara came out with news on culture, selected for publishing by Ion Vinea and poet Jacques G. Costin.

The left-wing preoccupations were also an important feature of Libertatea. Its opening manifesto called for a large-scale social reform, which it claimed was more important to Romanians than any National Liberal project to recover Transylvania from its Austro-Hungarian overlord. It enlisted contributions, generally less political than those at Seara, from literary figures such as Vinea, Demostene Botez, I. Dragoslav, Adrian Maniu and I. C. Vissarion.

Bogdan-Pitești regularly published his own articles in the two newspapers he directed, signing them with the pseudonym Al. Dodan. The early texts express his Russophobia and commiseration over France's alliance with Tsarist autocracy, the world's "most savage, most ignorant and bloodiest oligarchy". By 1915, assessing that Romania's national interest rested with the Habsburgs and the Germans, and arguing that Romanian peasants were worse off than their counterparts in Transylvania, he was urging his countrymen to ponder the benefits of Bessarabia's annexation to Romania.

=== Wartime, disgrace and death ===
The neutrality years also rekindled controversy over Alexandru Bogdan-Pitești's daily affairs. A scandal erupted in 1913, after banker Aristide Blank brought Bogdan-Pitești to court on charges of blackmail. The plaintiff enlisted the services of lawyer Take Ionescu, and the defendant, represented by Fleva, was ultimately sentenced to a jail term. Throughout the scandal, Seara hosted articles by Arghezi, professing Bogdan-Pitești's innocence. In 1916, just before Romania entered the war as an Entente country, Alexandru Bogdan-Pitești was again involved in a legal dispute with the Francophiles Take Ionescu and Barbu Ștefănescu-Delavrancea, with Constantin Dissescu as his lawyer.

The Ententist bid resulted in major initial defeats, and a Romanian theater of war was opened. The country suffered heavily, and Bucharest was taken by the Central Powers. Reputedly, the occupation forces picked up Bogdan-Pitești from his cell at Văcărești, where he was still serving time. Like Arghezi, Macedonski, Galaction and Mateiu Caragiale, he remained in German-occupied territory. Despite his apparent triumph over the Ententist lobby, he kept a low profile: according to popular but unverifiable rumors, he was even arrested once the occupation authorities angrily discovered his uselessness for the cause. He was however a free man as of April 12, 1917, the date of his marriage to Domnica Colanoski. One account has it that Bogdan-Pitești proceeded to denounce his Ileana colleague, Petrescu Găină, who had published a set of anti-German cartoons. As a result, the Romanian draftsman spent the war years in German captivity.

Once Romania recovered possession over its southern areas, Alexandru Bogdan-Pitești was reportedly prosecuted for treason and was again sent to Văcărești. Others however note that this last sentence, passed in 1919, was not in fact related to his wartime dealings, but merely to his fraudulent activities, and that only by coincidence did Bogdan-Pitești share a prison with the convicted collaborationist journalists (Arghezi, Karnabatt, Ioan Slavici).

T. Vianu notes that Bogdan-Pitești spent his last years "in ignominy", while Cernat describes his definitive fall to the status of "a pariah". The art promoter died four years after the war ended, at his house in Bucharest, having suffered a myocardial infarction. According to Cernat, his "grotesque" death was sudden, catching him in the middle of a telephone conversation. Reportedly, Bogdan-Pitești's last wish had been for his collection to pass into state property and be kept as a museum.

== Legacy ==
=== Role and influence ===
Bogdan-Pitești was the subject of fascination in the literary and artistic community. Lucian Boia writes about his seductive "legend", which fused an "imaginative and generous intellectual" with a "con artist" who "lived life as he saw fit". Art historian Corina Teacă notes that, like Félix Fénéon, Bogdan-Pitești was in fact fabricating his own myth: "every part of his public image was a removable mask." The art institutions he helped establish were, nevertheless, reputable. According to Paul Cernat, his influential circle was "an excellent medium of transmission for the modern spirit, an informal institution and one of the first coagulant factors for [Romania's] first post-symbolist modernism." Writing earlier, Theodor Enescu proposed that, like own group, the Știrbey-Vodă Street salon and Macedonski's circle were the only trend-setters active between the decline of Junimea society (ca. 1900) and the establishment of the modernist literature magazine Sburătorul (1919). Cernat additionally notes that, while the writer Alexandru Bogdan-Pitești was "neglectful and improvident" when it came to preserving his own works, those essays and prose poems that survived have a genuine value. Such judgments were also passed on his topical art essays. Art historian Petru Comarnescu writes that Bogdan-Pitești's "critical intuitions" were superior to those of fellow collectors Zambaccian and Ioan Kalinderu; critic Nicolae Oprescu also assesses that, without Bogdan-Pitești, Ștefan Luchian would be lost to Romanian art.

The Romanian art environment cherished, then despised, its anarchist patron. In his moments of glory, he received homages from many of his writer friends, as notebooks and albums compiled especially for him. At a later date, all sides of the dispute were united in expressing criticism for at least some of Bogdan-Pitești's deeds. According to Galaction, he was a "hajduk", who "robbed away and gave away." Zambaccian portrayed him as one "created from a mold in which the evil and the good genius were present in equal measure. [...] Cynical and suave, generous on one side, a con artist on the other, Al. Bogdan-Pitești relished the abjection that he served with cynicism". As Teacă notes, both Zambaccian and sculptor Oscar Han were among those forever "seduced" by Bogdan-Pitești's duplicity. In 1970, Han wrote: "we cannot judge [him] under common law. He remains an absurdity." While nationalist journalist Pamfil Șeicaru dismissed him as "a scoundrel", Macedonski argued that Bogdan-Pitești was "a wonderful prose writer and an admirable poet". Benjamin Fondane, the modernist poet-philosopher, praised Bogdan-Pitești as a man of exquisite taste, concluding that: "He was made of the greatest of joys, in the most purulent of bodies. How many generations of ancient boyars had come to pass, like unworthy dung, for this singular earth to be generated?"

Writer and critic Eugen Lovinescu, also a modernist, was bitterly opposed to the views of Bogdan-Pitești and most other intellectuals who sided with Germany: in 1922, he published the article Revizuiri morale ("Moral Revisions"), which reminded the public about the controversy surrounding the art collector and his associates (Arghezi, N. D. Cocea). A socialist acquaintance and an oral historian, Constantin Bacalbașa was convinced that Bogdan-Pitești was the prototype "inferior degenerate" and, in his political life, a manipulator of "the uncultured minds." Retrospective criticism of Bogdan-Pitești was also voiced by Comarnescu and co-author Ionel Jianu. Although they pay homage to Bogdan-Pitești's artistic qualities, the two speak of his "reproachable faults" and "con artist coups", finding in him "an exhibitionist determined to trick and scandalize", or an "enfant terrible".

Commentators have been tempted to compare Bogdan-Pitești with some controversial characters in world history, most often the prototype of self-seekers, Alcibiades. Others likened Bogdan-Pitești to the Renaissance writer and notorious blackmailer Pietro Aretino (Zambaccian stresses that, unlike Aretino, Bogdan-Pitești never duped his artists). Comarnescu proposed that Bogdan-Pitești and the equally controversial Arghezi were better understood through the logic of Hinduism ("the ancient Indian ethics"): "good and evil are not opposed, but collocated, combined, in a state of confusion". Taking in view Alexandru Bogdan-Pitești's preference for orality, his shady political connections, and his mostly informal channels of influence, Cernat concluded that, "the necessary changes having been made", one could compare Bogdan-Pitești with Nae Ionescu, a philosopher and far right activist whose career spanned the interwar period, and who had also debuted as a Symbolist.

=== Anecdotes ===
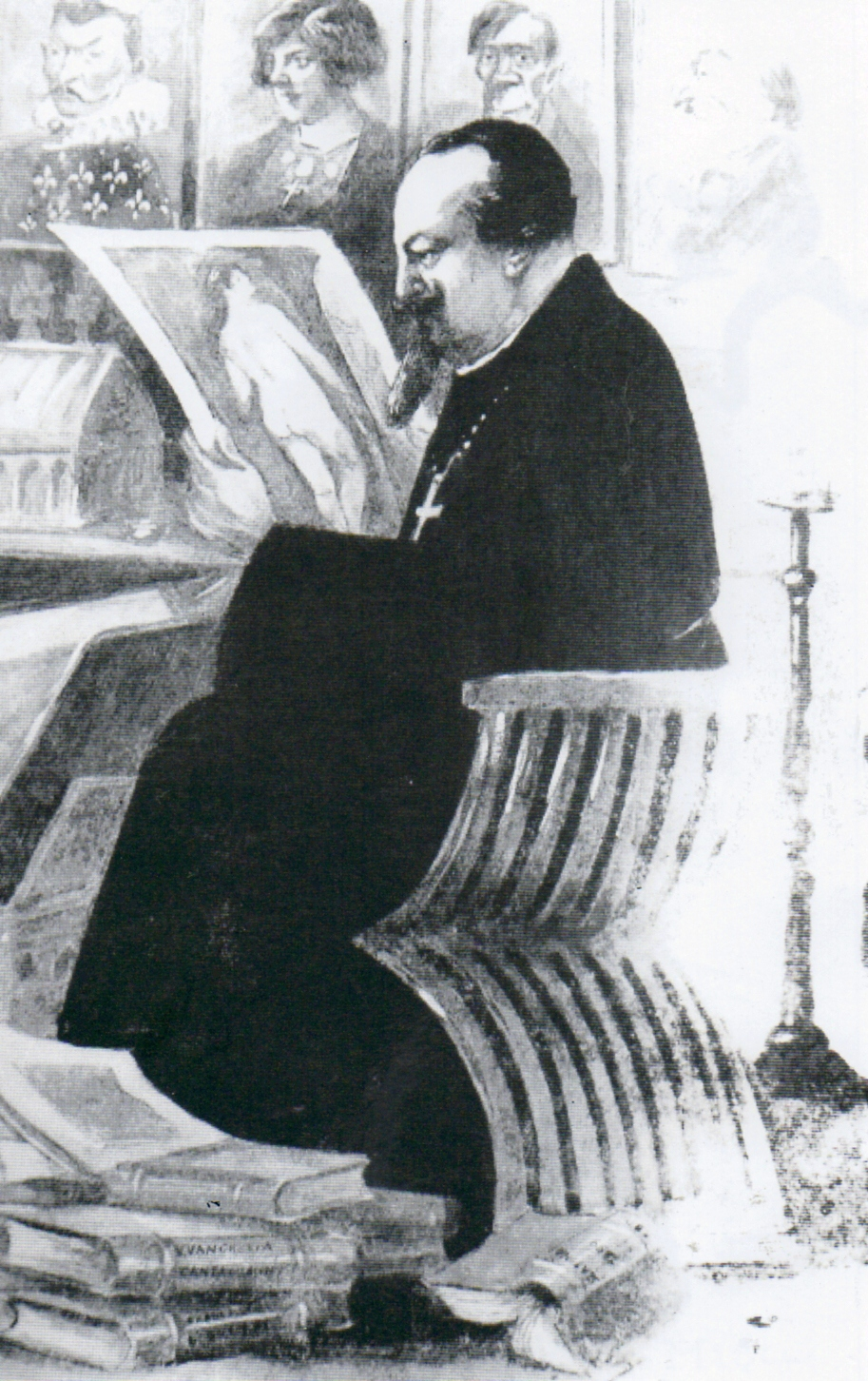
Caricature of Bogdan-Pitești looking over nudes, dressed in cassock (Nicolae Petrescu-Găină, 1913)

Several anecdotes concerning Bogdan-Pitești's morals and extravagant lifestyle were in circulation from his lifetime. In 1912, Macedonski published an autobiographical Christmas story. It tells how, inspired by Macedonski's desire to feed his family a traditional turkey feast, Bogdan-Pitești sent him the bird stuffed with 50 gold lei. As T. Vianu writes, such "attitudes of a grand feudal lord" made Bogdan-Pitești into an "indisputably picturesque" person. The account was partly confirmed by Constantin Beldie, who also noted that, during those years, Alexandru Macedonski was "starving" and had to provide for "a house full of children". Zambaccian however cites a contrasting story once told by actor Ion Iancovescu. It suggests that, during the wartime famine, Macedonski asked Bogdan-Pitești to pay him 1 million lei for one of the few surviving copies of Bronzes; Bogdan-Pitești bluntly offered him 5 lei—Macedonski gave in, commenting that "he is capable of changing his mind, that con artist!" Bogdan-Pitești's mood swings were also discussed by memoirist Radu D. Rosetti. He writes that the boyar scarcely minded when his fortune was being siphoned away by some members of his retinue, but that he publicly humiliated Galaction, and even Domnica, over random expenses.

The relationship between Mateiu Caragiale and his one-time patron has attracted special interest from period historians. Early on, the aspiring poet wrote a special piece in honor of his senior friend—called Dregătorul ("The Mandarin"), it is included in one of Bogdan-Pitești's albums. That accord degenerated during the late 1910s, to the point where Caragiale, whose diary spoke of Bogdan-Pitești's homosexuality in dismissive terms (calling him "a blusterer of the anti-natural vice"), laid out a plan to loot the Știrbey-Vodă Street villa. According to the same author, Bogdan-Pitești turned to passive homosexuality because he was impotent. Caragiale's diary also sketched a portrait of Domnica Bogdan, questioning her morality in harsh terms.

Bogdan-Pitești's other relationships with his other protégés could also fluctuate between extremes. According to an anecdote of the time, he advanced Luchian a large sum of money, which the painter used for a trip to Sinaia. Luchian then upset Bogdan-Pitești by not inviting him over, and was punished with a telegram addressed "To the ugliest tourist in Sinaia" (a pun on Luchian's proverbial bad looks). In the mid-1910s, Luchian had been incapacitated by multiple sclerosis. Bogdan-Pitești was one of the last to visit him before his death in June 1916, recording for posterity Luchian's resigned remark: "I'm going away".

The main first-hand account of Bogdan-Pitești's 1919 imprisonment comes from Ioan Slavici's Închisorile mele ("My Prisons"). According to Slavici, the art patron had a luxury cell with a view over Bucharest. Alexandru Rosetti, citing Arghezi, records one of Bogdan-Pitești's witticisms on the issue of prison life. When a Gendarme wrongly attempted to push him into Arghezi's line of suspected traitors, Bogdan-Pitești snapped: Pardon, eu sunt escroc! ("Pardon me, [but] I'm a con artist!"). Zambaccian writes that, during the first of his legal battles with Take Ionescu, Bogdan-Pitești commented on Ionescu's deposition: "He sure is talented, that crook!" The pro-Entente nationalist Octavian Goga was especially upset by Alexandru Bogdan-Pitești's stances, and, in his record of 1916 events (including the Ionescu trial), wrote him off as a "bandit" fed with "German money".

=== Fictional character ===
After the World War, according to Beldie, actor Iancovescu introduced impressions of Bogdan-Pitești to his cabaret routine. It showed the convicted Garmanophile and an unnamed German official, who looked into the mislanding of propaganda funds on supporting petty "henchmen". To this charge, the fictional Bogdan-Pitești replies: "I have consumed your money, this much is true, but I did not pull one on you! For how is it that you could imagine me, a traitor of my country, not also being a con artist?" According to Beldie, the account has a grain of truth: instead of using money to revive the Germanophile cause, Bogdan-Pitești directed them into his art collection. A somewhat similar version of this urban legend is included in the memoirs of a National Liberal adversary, I. G. Duca, who sees Bogdan-Pitești's retort as a paradoxical sign of injured patriotism: "Did you perhaps think that you might buy off some of Romania's honest people? You would be dead wrong, in this land one can only buy off the con artists, only con artists such as myself." Duca concludes: "this reply, with its admirable and atavistic national dignity, tempts me to forget, though not to forgive, the utter turpitude that we call Bogdan-Pitești's life."

Despite their relationship having declined from friendship to hatred, Bogdan-Pitești's style and his mundane interests are occasionally seen as sources of inspiration for Caragiale's only novel, Craii de Curtea-Veche (completed in 1928). Some have noted that Bogdan-Pitești has a lot in common with at least one of the three protagonists. He and his wife were both characters in Ion Vinea's novels Venin de mai ("May Venom") and Lunatecii ("The Lunatics")—Alexandru as Adam Gună, Domnica as wife Iada Gună. Both novels portray the Bogdans' cultural circle, allude to their influence in making young people reject all conventionalism, and show them promoting vice as virtue. This lifestyle has taken its toll on Adam Gună, who is a physical ruin and slowly loses his hold on reality. Vinea's books repeat claims that Bogdan-Pitești was abusing drugs, and that Domnica was originally a prostitute.

More fiction work dealing with the Bogdan-Pitești circle was published from a casual contributor to Seara, Lucrezzia Karnabatt. In her 1922 novel, Demoniaca, she portrays her employer as "Basile Dan", a sinister traitor of his country and a cynical pornographer. Ion Călugăru used Alexandru Bogdan-Pitești as the inspiration for "Alexandru Lăpușneanu", the boyar character in his novel Don Juan Cocoșatul ("Don Juan the Hunchback"). Literary historian George Călinescu notes that this fictional portrait shows: "The dignity in gossip, the boyar carriage, the refinement that the apparent vulgarity cannot bring to ruin, the blasé and cynical lechery [...]." In one episode in the book, Lăpușneanu simulates agony and receives a Catholic confession that (he insists) must be read in Latin instead of French; elsewhere, Lăpușneanu's eccentric and adulterous wife Fetița ("Little Girl") shows up on a battlefield, wearing nothing more than a swimsuit.

Tudor Arghezi dedicated Bogdan-Pitești some of his first poetry writings. As art critics, Arghezi and Theodor Cornel published a comprehensive biographical study on their patron (part of their Figuri contimporane din România dictionary, 1909). However, according to Corina Teacă, the encomium-like and conveniently imprecise entry may have been sent in, or at least approved of, by Bogdan-Pitești. Arghezi also made his sponsor the hero of a small eponymous poem, wherein he is called Lombard bastard cu ochi de rouă ("bastard Lombard with the eyes of dew").

=== Collection and estate ===
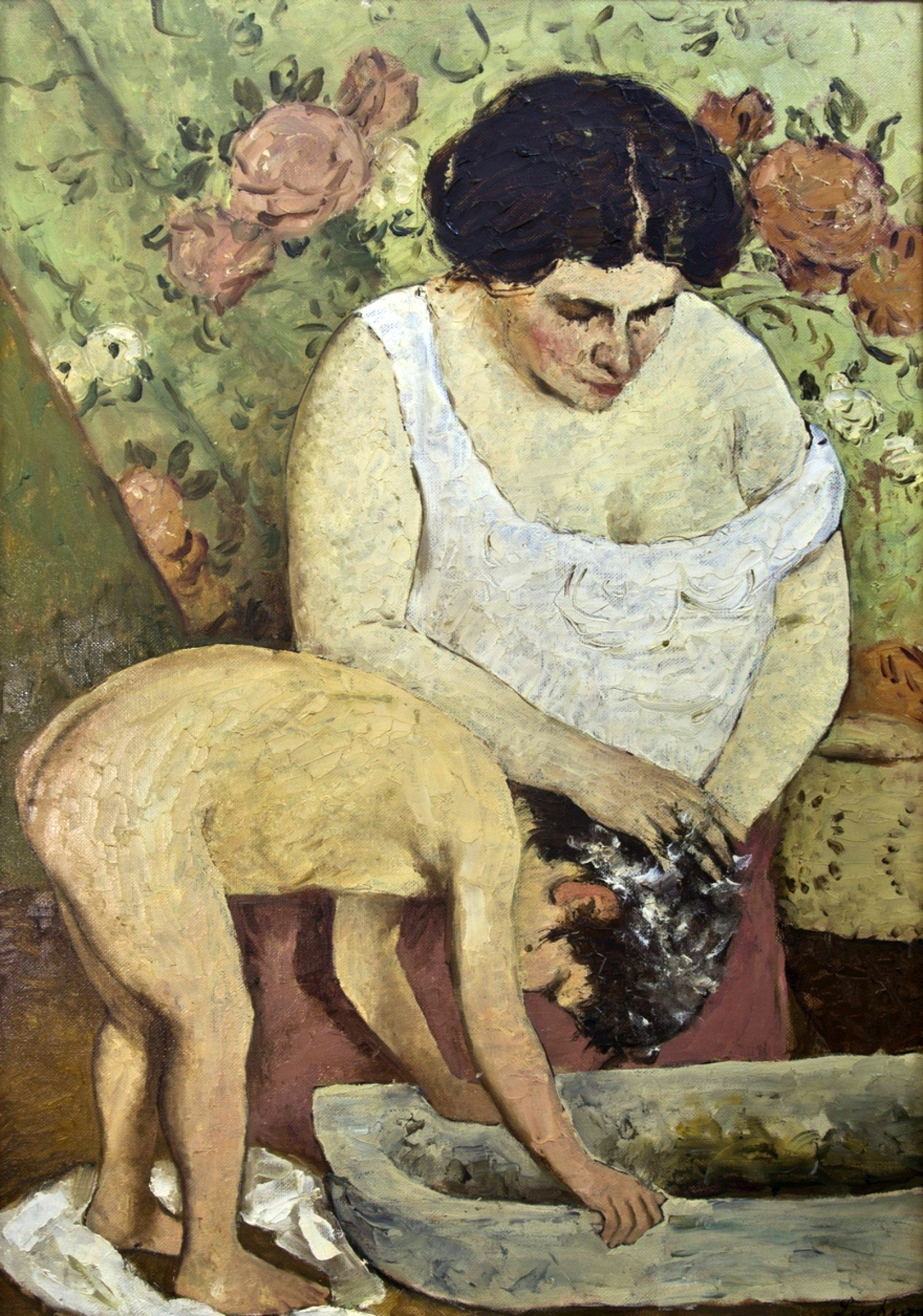
Ștefan Luchian's Lăutul ("Washing the Hair"), one of the best known paintings in Bogdan-Pitești's collection

By the 1910s, Bogdan-Pitești's art interests gave birth to a collection of as few as 967 or as many as 1,500 individual works, most of them hosted by his estate in Colonești. They comprised objects created by prominent Romanian visual artists, including, alongside his early associates, Nina Arbore, Constantin Brâncuși, Oscar Han, Aurel Jiquidi, Maria Ciurdea Steurer, Constantin Medrea, Ary Murnu, Dimitrie Paciurea, Nicolae Petrescu-Găină, Alexandru Satmari, Francisc Șirato, Cecilia Cuțescu-Storck, Jean Alexandru Steriadi, Friedrich Storck, Ion Theodorescu-Sion, and Nicolae Tonitza. Of the total, around 900 works were of Romanian provenance. Among the foreign artists whose work was featured in the collection were Georges Rochegrosse and Frank Brangwyn. The section dedicated to newer works of art was designed and opened as the first the modern art museum in Romania.

The Bogdan-Pitești trust included many samples of Luchian's art. Two of his famous paintings featured there were Lăutul ("Washing the Hair")—which Bogdan-Pitești is said to have likened to the luminous oil paintings of Paolo Veronese, and Safta Florăreasa ("Safta the Flower Girl")—originally part of the Luchian family collection. Also included was the 1907 oil portrait of Luchian's cousin, Alecu Literatu ("Alecu the Literary Man"). They were accompanied by the 1906 pastel Durerea ("Pain"), which had been reproduced in a 1914 issue of Seara, and by the paintings De Nămezi ("Lunchtime") and Lica, fetița cu portocala ("Lica, the Girl with the Orange"). Among the works in the series were two portraits of Bogdan-Pitești: an ink drawing, copies of which were circulated with Bogdan-Pitești's election manifesto of 1899, and a since-lost oil painting.

Bogdan-Pitești was the subject of several anonymous sketches, including two 1896 vignettes, published in Adevărul, and a 1917 drawing signed Correggio. He is also depicted in an affectionate cartoon published in 1914 by Petrescu Găină. Domnica Bogdan herself sat as a model for various artists, and was notably depicted in works by Camil Ressu, Pallady and the Bulgarian-born painter Pascin. In 1920, Bogdan-Pitești commissioned Paciurea to complete a portrait bust of Domnica. The same year, Dimitrescu painted her an oil-on-cardboard portrait in dominant shades of brown (with touches of red and gray). Artists who illustrated works by Bogdan-Pitești include, in addition to himself, George Demetrescu Mirea, Ion Georgescu and Satmari.

The Colonești manor and its art fund fell victim to neglect. According to T. Vianu, the collection was "blown over by the wind of devastation" even during the interwar years. In 1924, in defiance of its owner's final request, it was subject to a hasty public auction. This drew protests from literary figures such as Cezar Petrescu, Perpessicius and Victor Eftimiu. As a result of the auction, many works passed into the collections of Zambaccian, Alexandru G. Florescu, Iosif Dona and several others. Of them, Zambaccian attributed the incident to the National Liberal government's unwillingness to accept donations from "a compromised person". He and several other commentators place responsibility for the sales on Finance Minister Ion Lapedatu, who is believed to have either hesitated in assessing the collection or to have plotted with businessmen who wanted it sold cheaply. Zambaccian was to be the eventual owner of Lăutul. It became a feature of his own Bucharest museum, and appears with Zambaccian in an oil portrait by Pallady.

Under the communist regime, the Vlaici building was transformed into a branch for the state-owned producer of agricultural machinery, and, in 2004, belonged to its successor, Agromec (although still largely unused). Beldie recounts that, under communism, the destitute Domnica Bogdan worked as a hygienist at Bucharest Central Hospital.
