= The Jewelled Serpent =

1872 novel by E. J. Richmond

The Jewelled Serpent, a Study of To-day
- Author: E. J. Richmond
- Language: English
- Subject: Temperance
- Genre: Young adult fiction
- Set in: Wealthy and fashionable portion of a large city
- Publisher: National Temperance Society and Publishing House
- Publication date: 1872
- Publication place: U.S.
- Media type: Cloth-bound hardcover
- Pages: 271
- OCLC: 1317274

The Jewelled Serpent, a Study of To-day was an 1872 young adult novel by E. J. Richmond. Published in New York City by the National Temperance Society and Publishing House, it was cloth-bound and had 271 pages. Through its story, the book inculcated those principles of morality associated in the temperance movement era with becoming a responsible adult.

== Plot ==
The story centers around a doctor's prescription: "Cod-liver oil and rum three times a day". This was well-adapted to the practice prevalent in the profession of advising the use of alcoholic liquors as medicine. The title of the book references a birthday present given to the heroine of the story by her father. It was a bracelet wrought in the form of a serpent, and set with diamonds and a ruby. It was intended by the father as a talisman, warning her against the "evil serpent", intemperance, which had brought ruin in his family. The characters were well-delineated, and taken from the wealthy and fashionable portion of a large city. The harm which comes from fashionable drinking is portrayed, and also the danger arising from the use of alcohol when taken as medicine, which can lead to an addiction.
