= Ștefan Luchian =

Romanian painter (1868–1916)

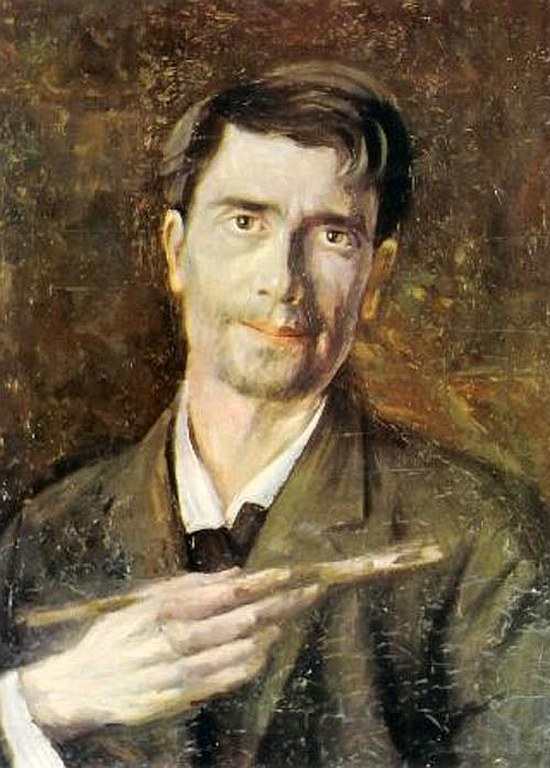
- A Housepainter (self-portrait), 1909
- Born: 1 February 1868; Ștefănești, Botoșani County, United Danubian Principalities
- Died: 28 June 1916 (aged 48); Bucharest, Kingdom of Romania
- Resting place: Bellu Cemetery, Bucharest
- Education: National School of Fine Arts
- Known for: Painting, and modernism
- Movement: Impressionism, Post-Impressionism, Symbolism
- Patrons: Alexandru Bogdan-Pitești; Take Ionescu

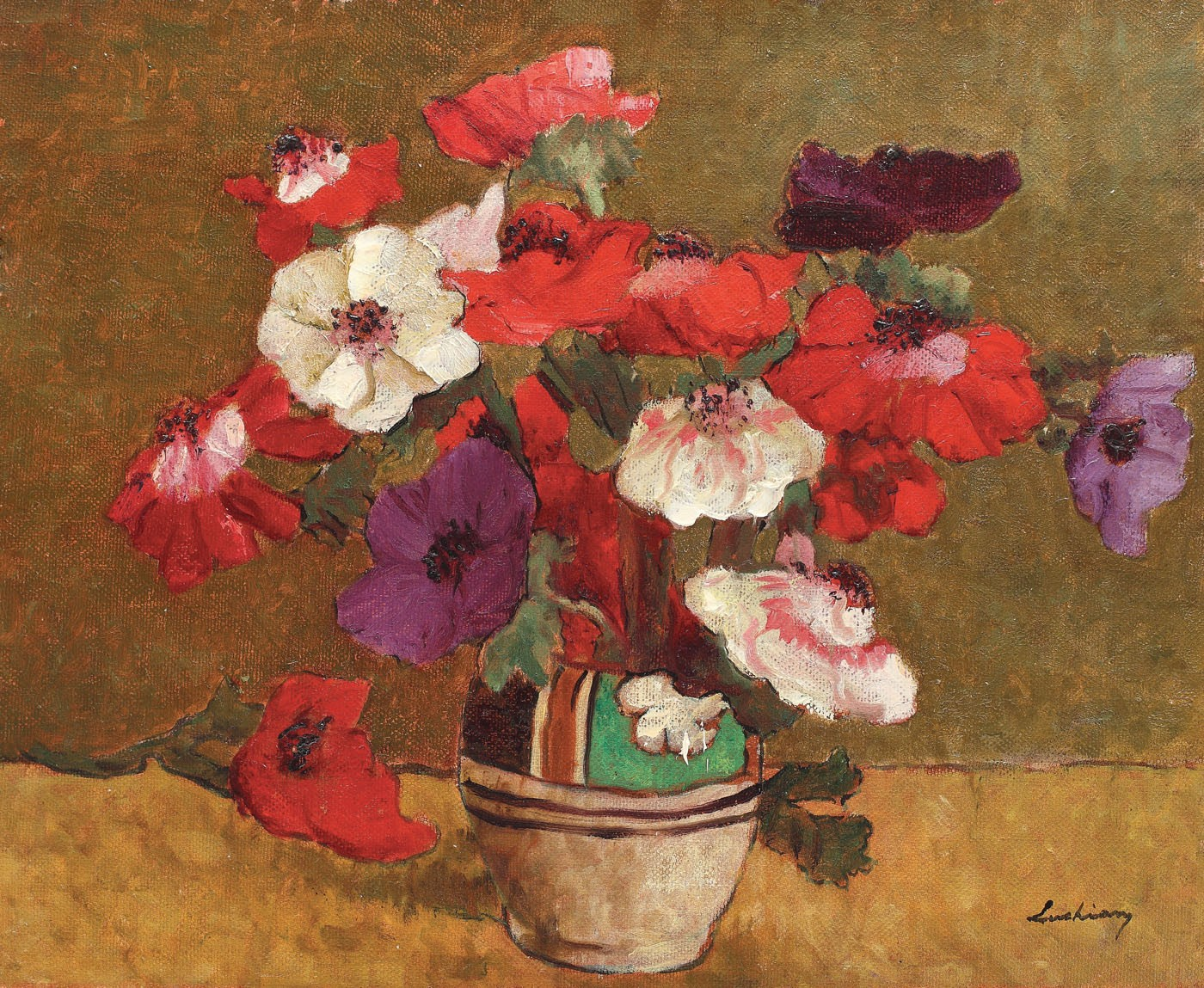
Anemona Flowers (1911–1913)

Ștefan Luchian (Romanian pronunciation: [ʃteˈfan lukiˈan], last name also spelled Lukian; 1 February 1868 – 28 June 1916) was a Romanian painter, famous for his landscapes and still life works.

== Biography ==
=== Early life ===
Luchian was born in Ștefănești, a village of Botoșani County, as the son of Major Dumitru Luchian and of Elena Chiriacescu. In 1873, the Luchian family moved to Bucharest, where he attended the Cantemir High School. His mother desired that he would follow his father's path and join the Military School; instead, in 1885, Luchian joined the painting class at the Fine Arts School, where he was encouraged to pursue a career in art by Nicolae Grigorescu, whose work was to have a major effect on his entire creative life.

Starting in autumn of 1889 Luchian studied for two semesters at the Munich Fine Arts Academy, where he created copies of the works by Correggio and Rembrandt housed in the Kunstareal. After his return to Romania, he took part in the first exhibition of the Cercul Artistic art group.

He showed himself unable to accept the academic guidelines imposed by the Bavarian and Romanian schools. The following year, he left for Paris, where he studied at the Académie Julian, and, although taught by the academic artist William-Adolphe Bouguereau, became acquainted with Impressionist works of art. Luchian's painting Ultima cursă de toamnă shows the influence of Édouard Manet and Edgar Degas, but also echoes of the Société des Artistes Indépendants, Modernism, and Post-Impressionism (also obvious in works created after his return to Bucharest).

=== Chronic illness and death ===
In 1896, together with Nicolae Vermont, Constantin Artachino, and the art collector, Alexandru Bogdan-Pitești, Luchian was one of the main founders of Bucharest's Salonul Independenților, which was opened in front of the official Salon (the Romanian equivalent of the Paris Salon). Two years later, the group led to the creation of Societatea Ileana and its press organ, Ileana, with Luchian as the original illustrator. From then on Luchian began integrating Symbolist elements in his work, taking inspiration from various related trends: Art Nouveau, Jugendstil, and Mir iskusstva (see Symbolist movement in Romania).

In 1900, Luchian contributed two pastels to Romania's Pavilion at the World Fair, and in the same year experiencing the first symptoms of multiple sclerosis. After some initial improvements, this illness was lifelong. Nonetheless, he continued painting and, until 1915, had his works displayed in numerous exhibitions, albeit to a largely indifferent public. At his 1905 exhibition, the only buyer of a painting was his former teacher Grigorescu. Despite being appreciated by a select few (including the writer Ion Luca Caragiale), Luchian lived in poverty (the large fortune he had inherited was progressively drained).

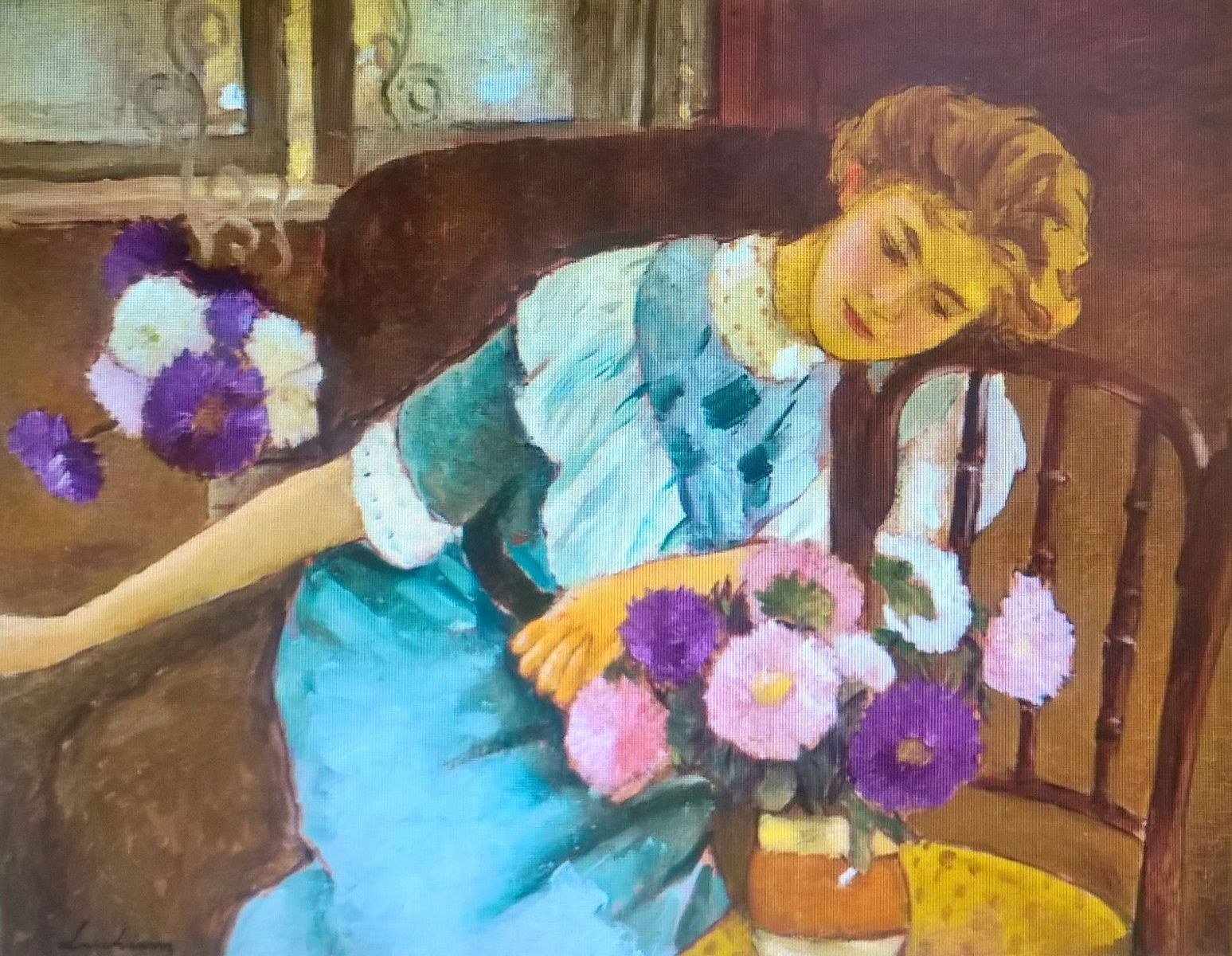
Interior (Lorica), Luchian's last painting (1913)

Paralysed from 1909, he had to live the rest of his life in an armchair. This did not prevent him from working on an entire series of landscapes and flowers. He had begun flower paintings earlier, but from 1908 he concentrated all his creative energy into the subject. Toward the end of his life, Luchian was no longer able to hold the painter's brush with his fingers, and was instead helped to tie it to his wrist in order to continue work.

At the time, he had begun enjoying considerable success – a phenomenon which the writer Tudor Arghezi attributed to the momentary rise of Take Ionescu as a politician (Ionescu had become the center of a fashion and subject of imitation, and he was among the first to buy more than one of Luchian's paintings). As his disease became notorious, a rumor spread that Luchian allowed someone else to paint in his name; the scandal brought about Luchian's arrest under charges of fraud (he was released soon after). Arghezi took pride in being one of his few defenders.

One of the last events in Luchian's life was a visit paid to his house by composer and violinist George Enescu. Although the two had never met before, Enescu played his instrument as a personal tribute to the dying artist.

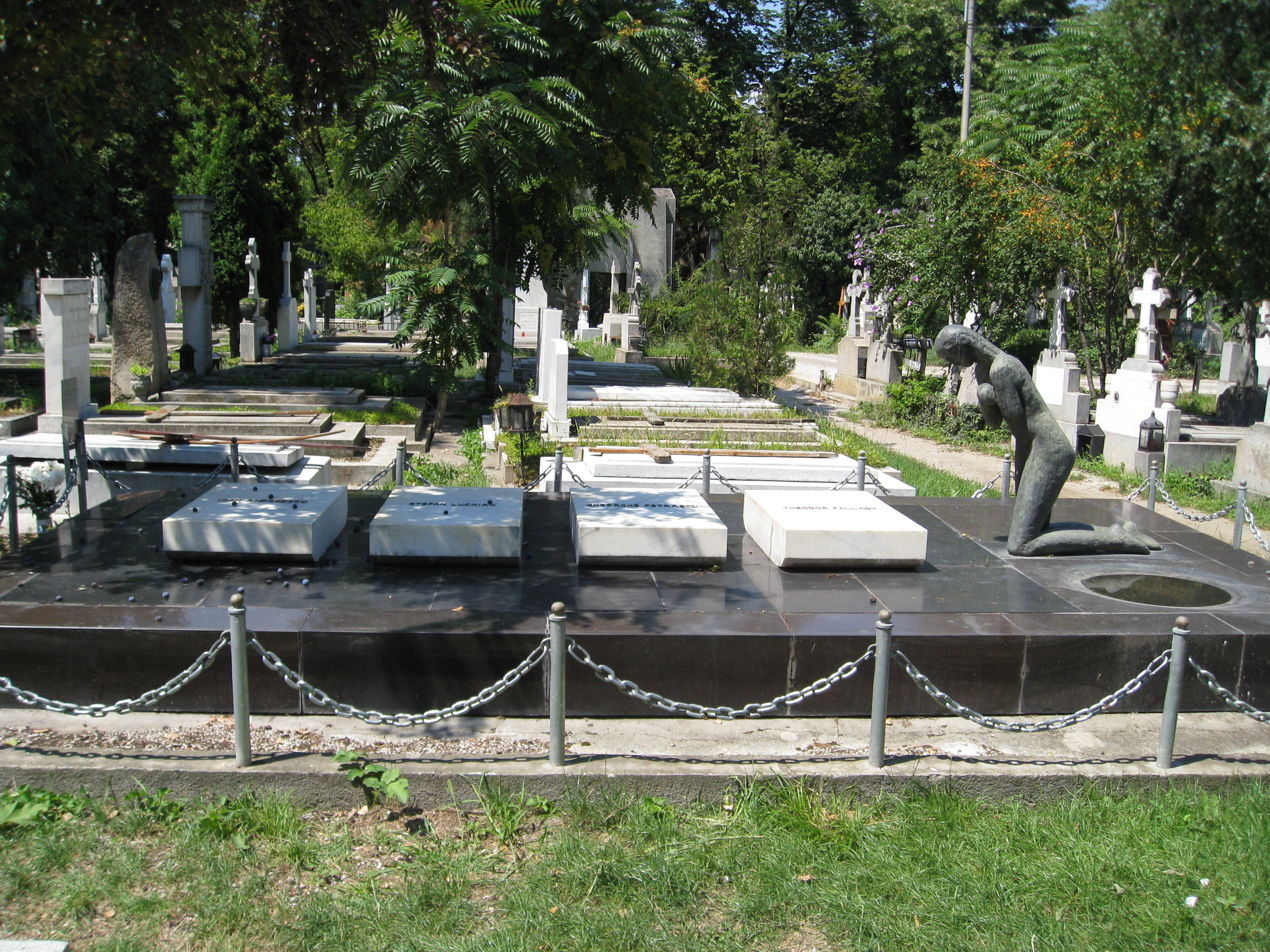
Grave of Ștefan Luchian at Bellu Cemetery (second from left)

He died in Bucharest and was buried at the city's Bellu Cemetery.

== Legacy ==
By the 1930s, Luchian's impact on Romanian art was becoming the subject of disputes in the cultural world, with several critics claiming that his work had been minor and the details of his life exaggerated. Arghezi was again involved in the polemic, and wrote passionate pieces which supported Luchian's art and attributed adverse reactions to jealousy and to Luchian's voiced distaste for mediocrity.

In 1948, Luchian was posthumously elected to the Romanian Academy. An art school in Botoșani bears his name.

His life was the subject of Nicolae Mărgineanu's 1981 film, Ștefan Luchian, where his character was played by Ion Caramitru (Maria Ploae was Luchian's sister; other actors starring in the film where George Constantin, Ștefan Velniciuc, Florin Călinescu as Arghezi, and Adrian Pintea as Nicolae Tonitza).

== Gallery ==
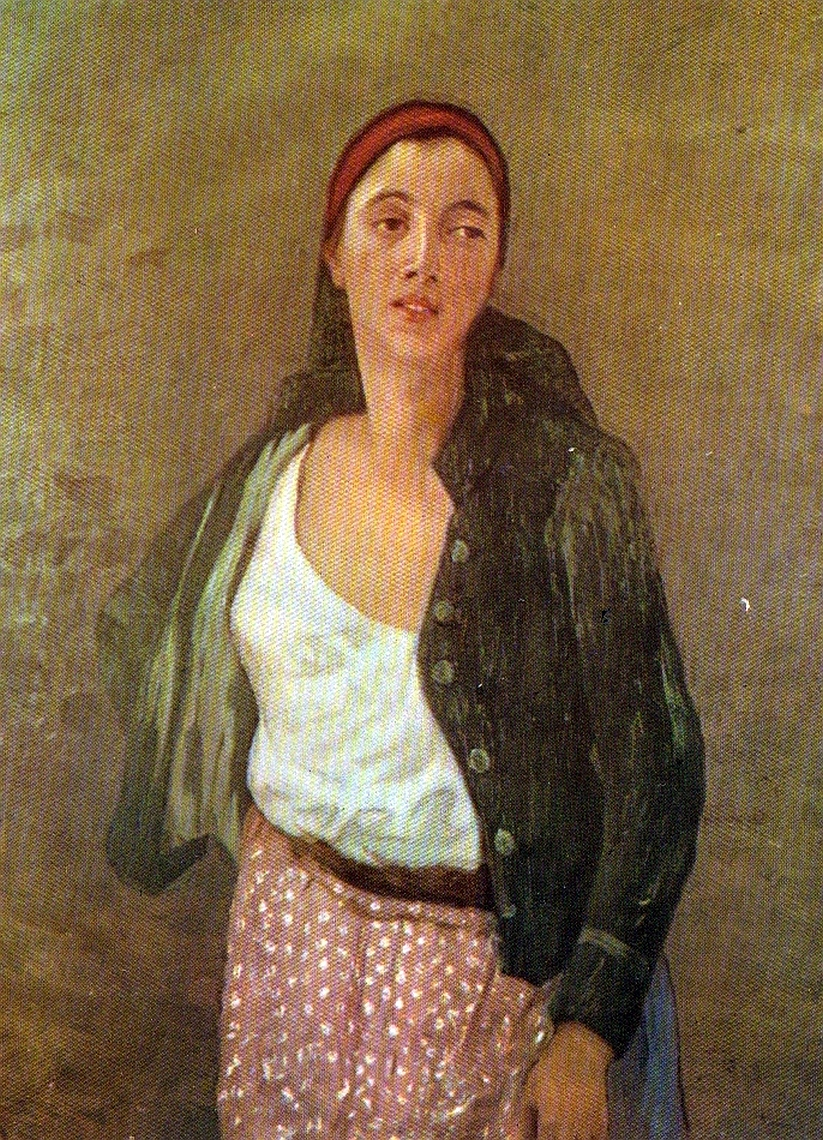
Safta the Flower Girl, 1895

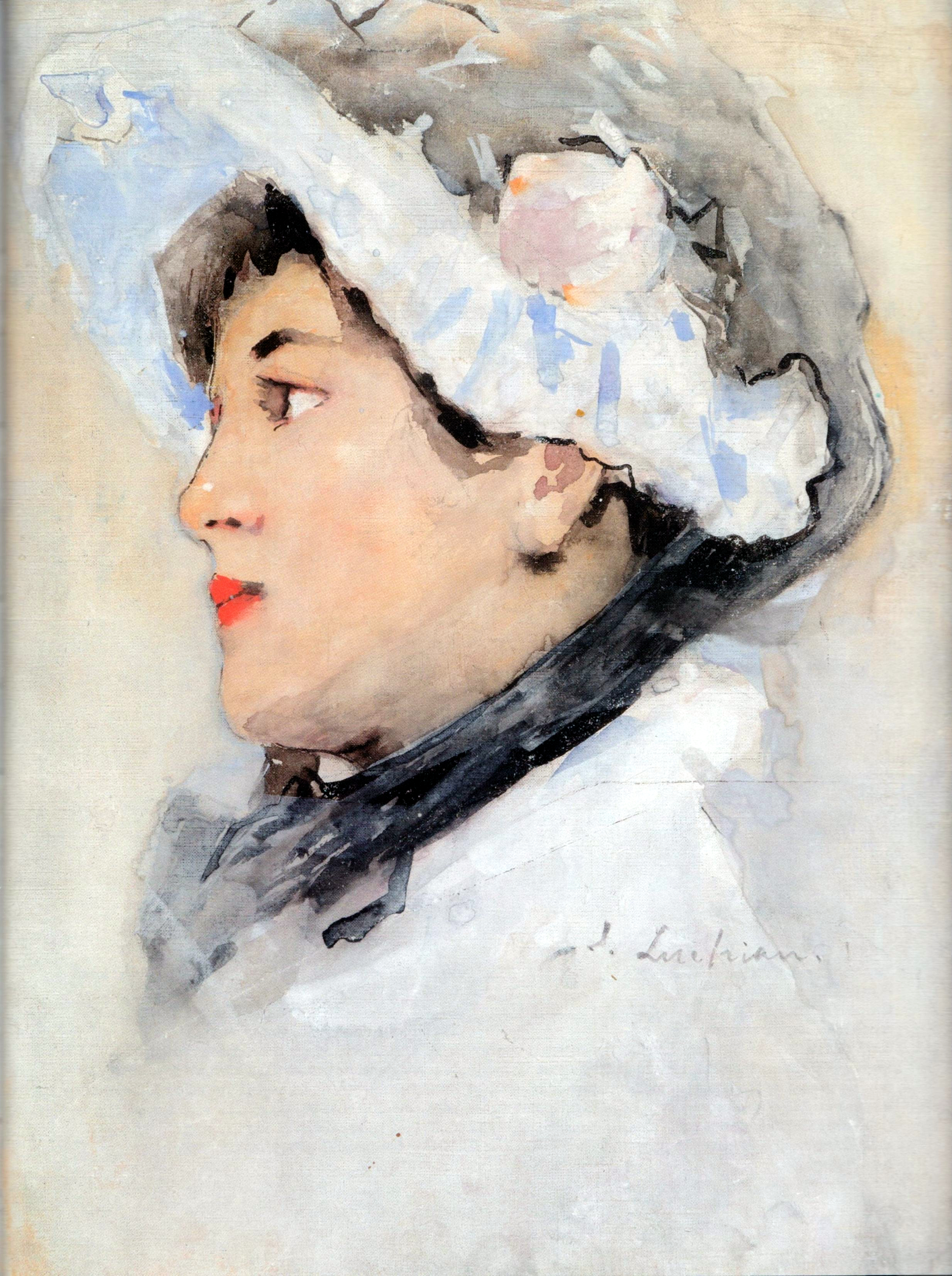
Portrait of a Woman 1901

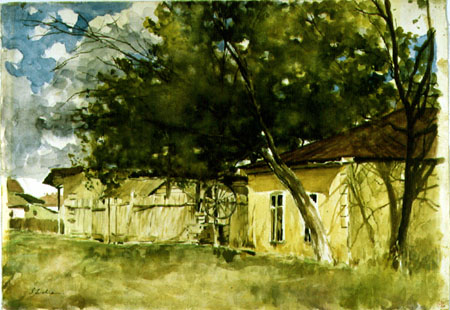
The Well on Clucerului Street 1902-1904

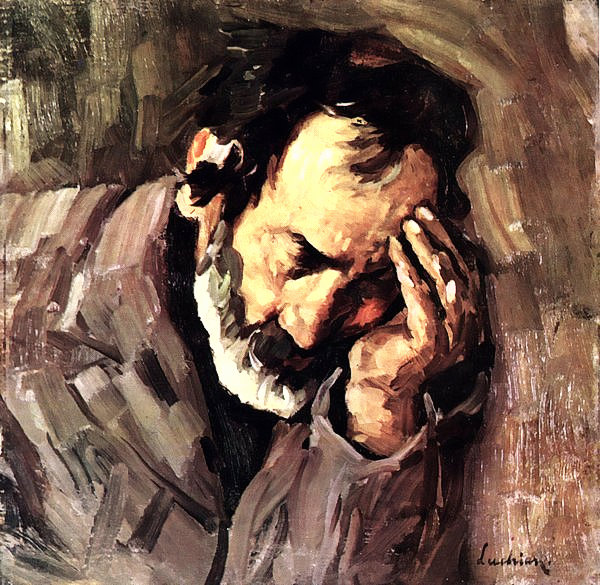
Old Man Nicolae the Fiddler, 1906

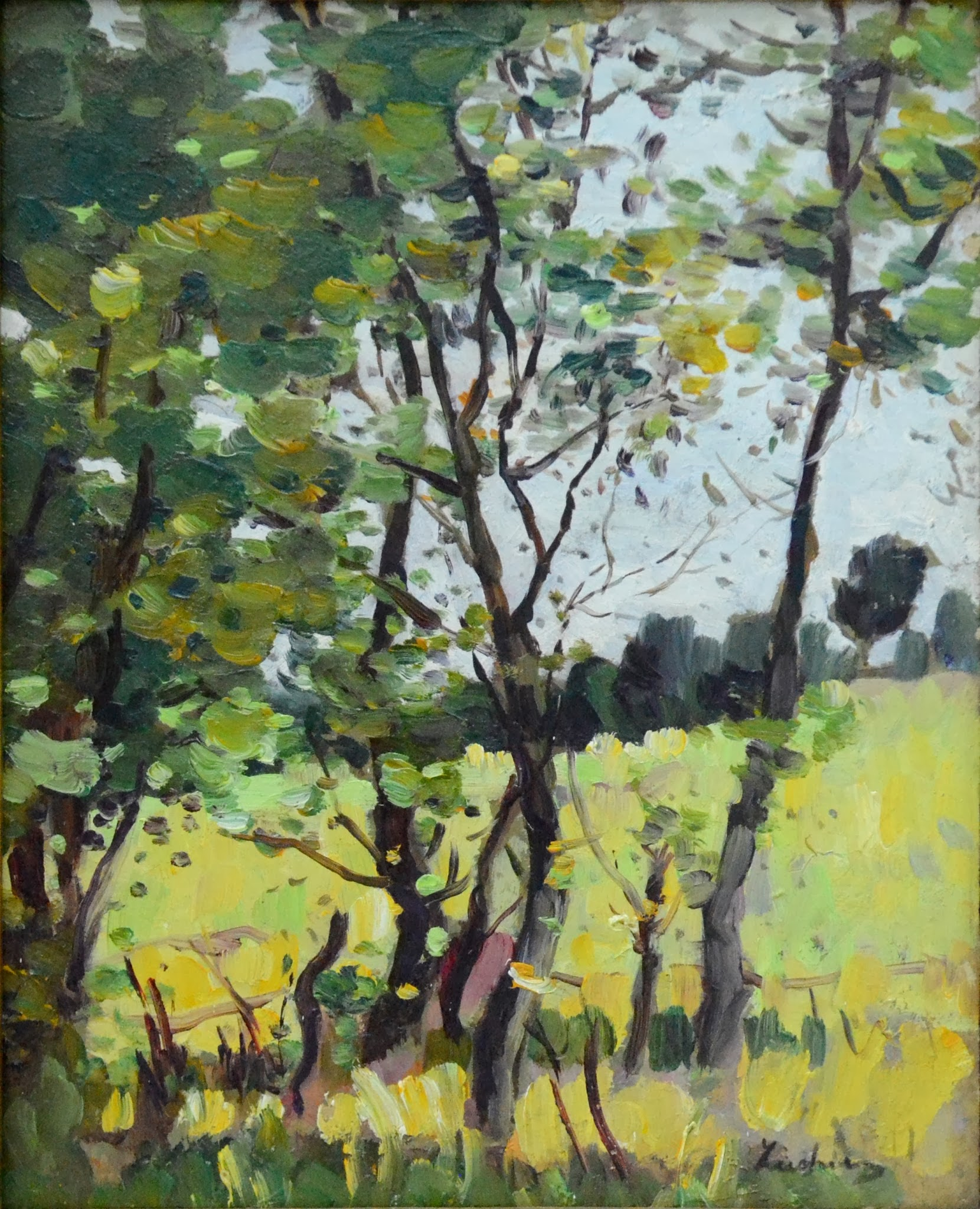
The River Meadow at Poduri, 1909

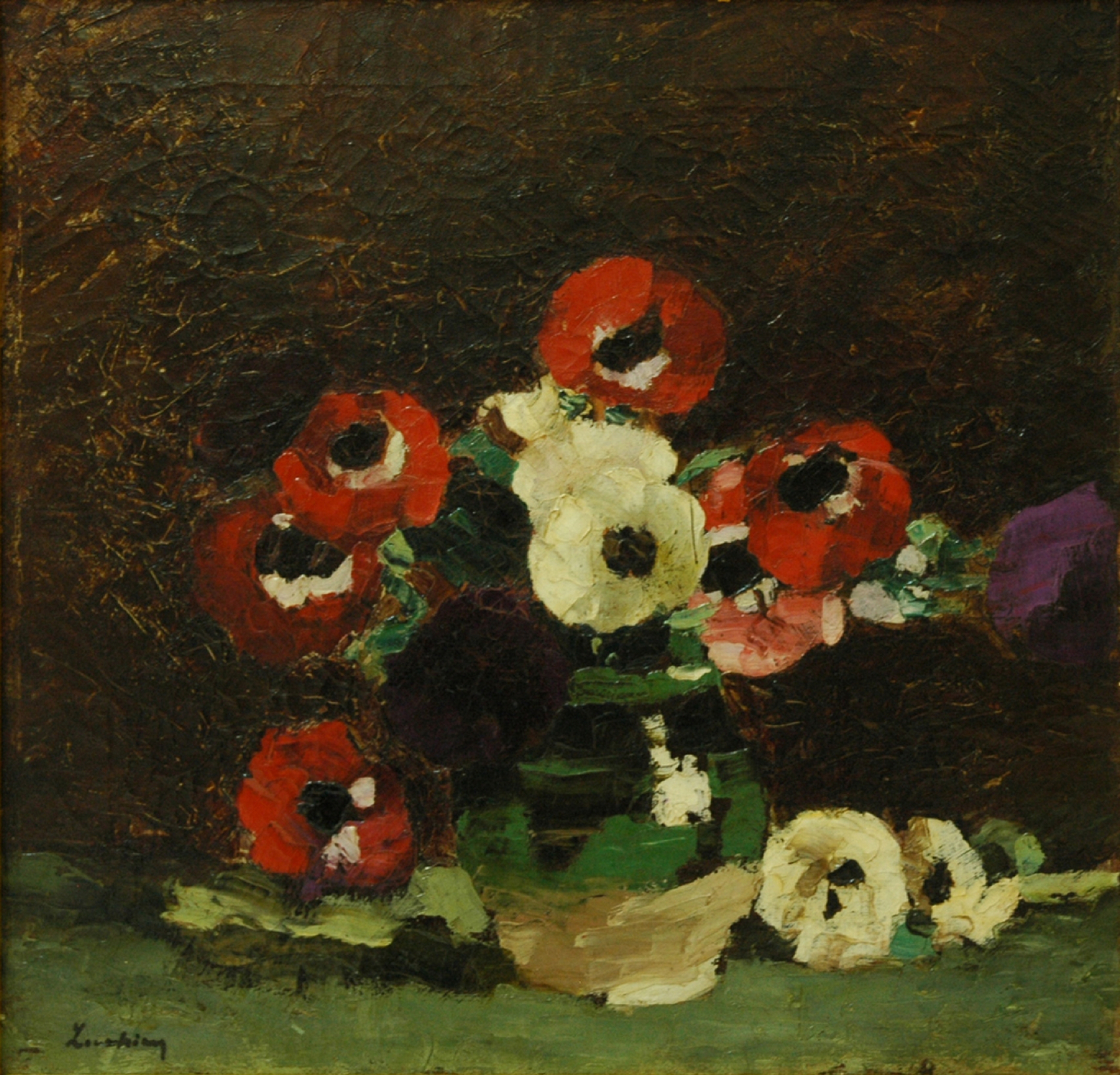
Anemona Flowers, 1908

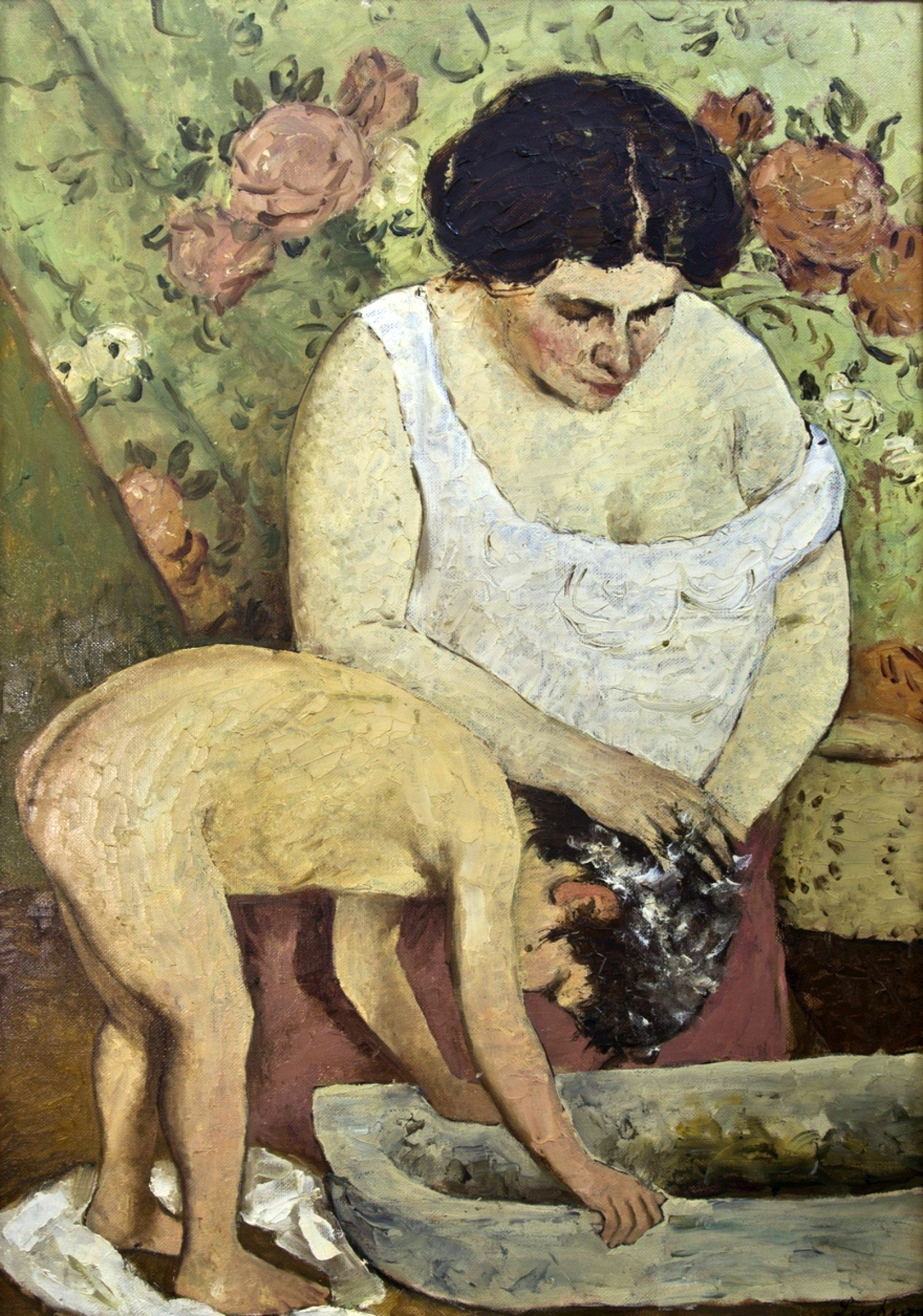
Hair Washing, 1911-1912

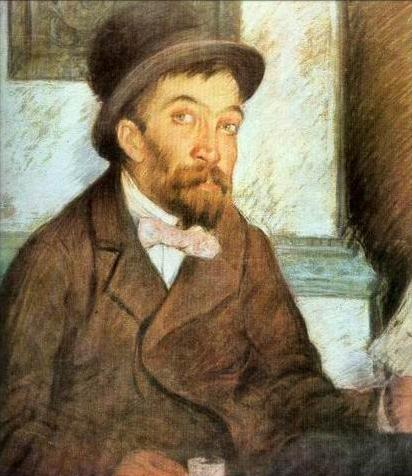
Alecu the Literary Man

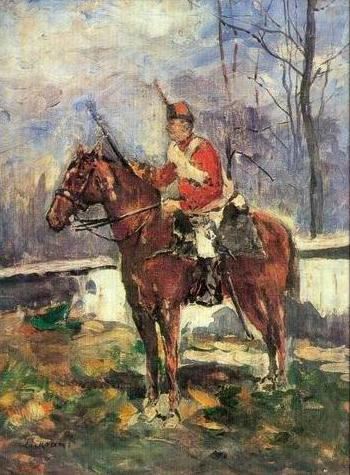
The Mounted Red Hussar

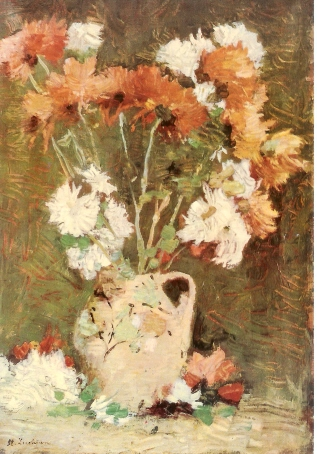
Chrysanthemums

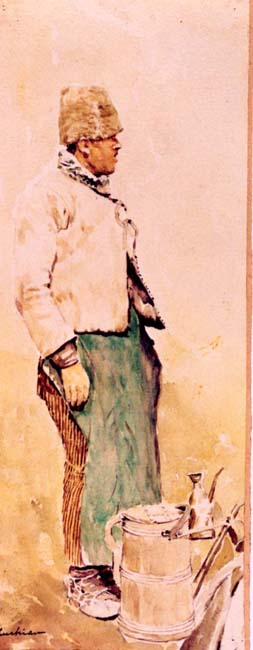
The Millet Beer Seller

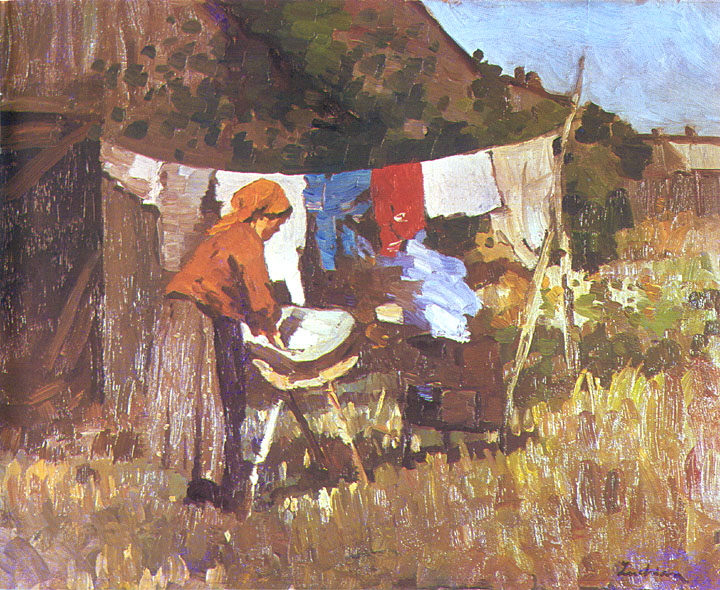
The Laundress

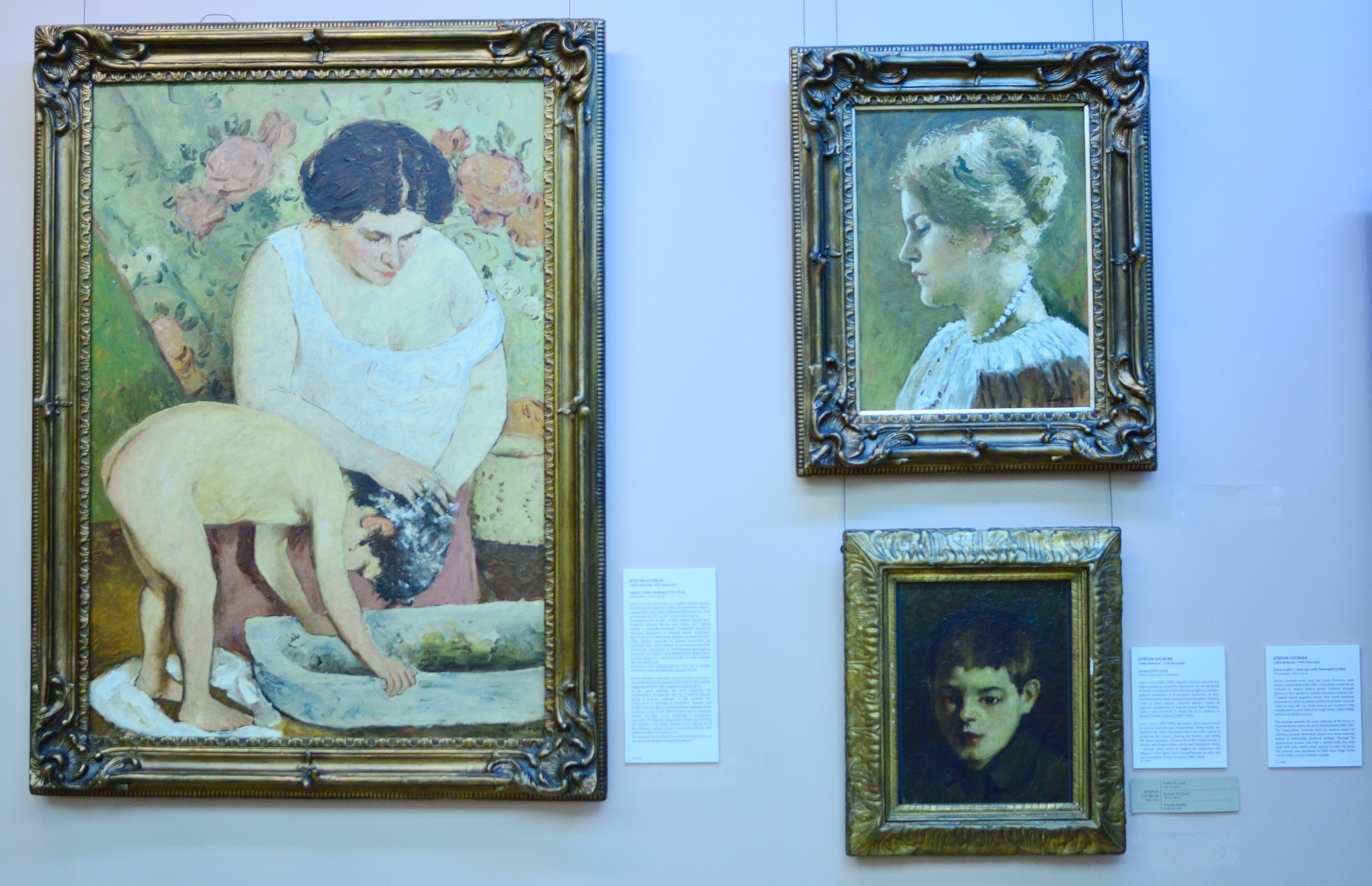
Three paintings by Luchian in the Zambaccian Museum
