= John van Melle =

Dutch-born South African writer (1887–1953)

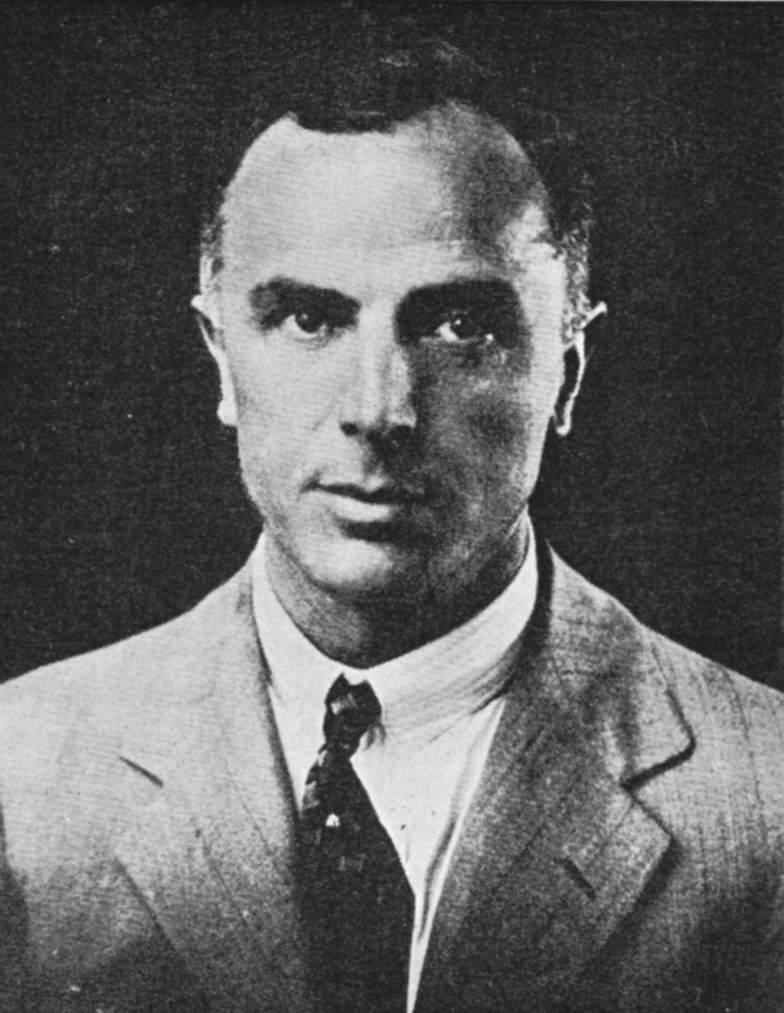
- Born: Johannes van Melle; 11 February 1887 Goes
- Died: 8 November 1953 (aged 66)

Jan van Melle (11 February 1887 – 8 November 1953) was the pen name of a Dutch-born South African writer. His real name was Johannes van Melle.

Van Melle was born in Goes. He arrived in South Africa in 1906, and after a short sojourn in the Netherlands East Indies, settled in South Africa permanently in 1913. He worked as a teacher in many rural schools and soon started to publish in both Dutch and the newly emerging Afrikaans language.

Van Melle's best known work is the novel Bart Nel, a classic of Afrikaans literature. It tells the tale of a farmer whose indomitable spirit allows him to survive the destruction and loss of his farm in wartime and being abandoned by his wife and family.
