= Woman, First and Last, and What She has Done =

- Author: E. J. Richmond
- Language: English
- Genre: biographical dictionary
- Publisher: New York City: Phillips & Hunt, Cincinnati: Cranston & Stowe
- Publication date: 1887
- Publication place: U.S.
- Media type: Hard cover
- Pages: 271 pages (volume 1); 300 pages (volume 2)
- OCLC: 19117104

Woman, First and Last, and What She has Done (New York: Phillips & Hunt. Cincinnati: Cranston & Stowe, 1887) is a two-volume biographical dictionary for young adults by E. J. Richmond, an American author who consulted authorities on the subject in preparing the work. These two volumes of about 300 duodecimo pages each, are made up of sketches of the lives and characters of 65 women (Note: According to Curry (1887), the two volumes contain sketches of 93 women.) who achieved distinction in their generation. Beginning with Eve and ending with Harriet Hosmer, others include Miriam, Queen Victoria and Harriet Beecher Stowe. Fifteen of its biographies belong to ancient times, as many more to the Middle Ages and the Reformation, another 15 to the 18th century, and 20 to the 19th century. None of the sketches are very long.

In sketching these varied characters, Richmond aimed, as she states in her preface, to prove "the power of woman for good or evil." This she does, not in elaborate biographical essays, but in plain, clear outlines of the characteristic incidents of their several lives. One may not accept all her estimates of their worth; yet viewing her sketches as biographical condensations written in simple style, one may view them as digests of many historical facts, adapted to inform the general reader, and to increase the desire of young minds for more information of the times in which these women lived, of the circumstances which made them what they were, and of the impact they left on the communities in which they lived.
