= E. J. Richmond =

Euphemia Johnson Richmond
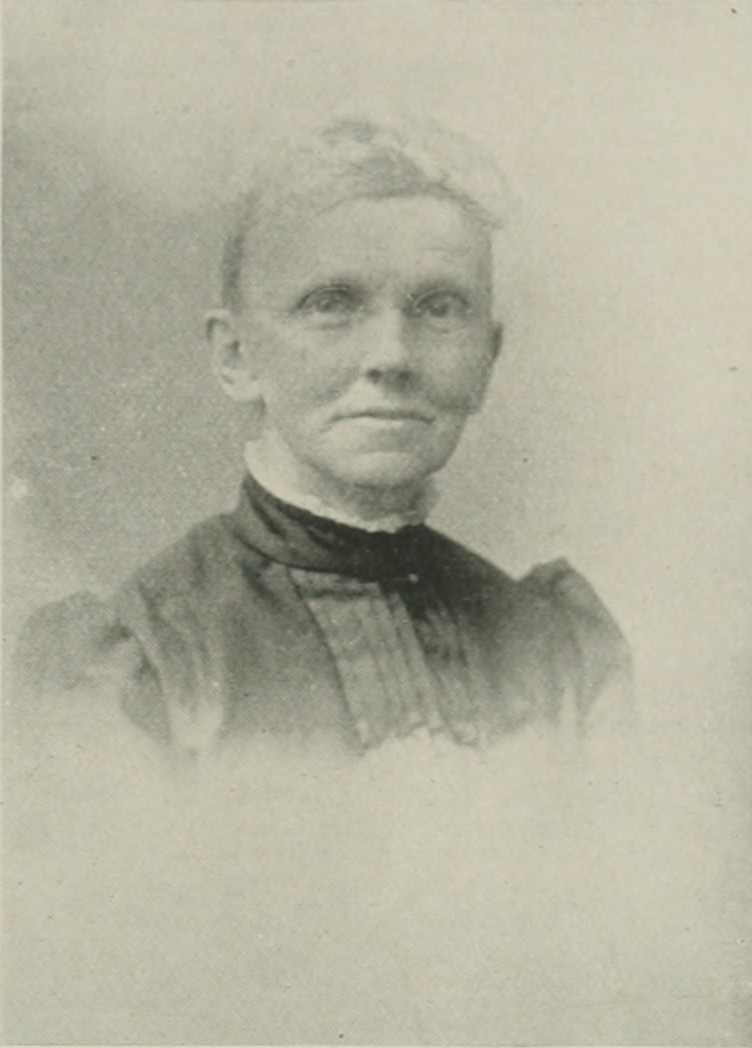
- Photo in A Woman of the Century
- Born: Euphemia Johnson Guernsey; July 28, 1825; Mount Upton, New York, U.S.
- Died: February 9, 1918 (aged 92); Mount Upton, New York
- Occupation: writer
- Spouse: Orson Richmond (m. 1846; died 1904)
- Children: 3
- Writing career
- Pen name: "Effie Johnson"; "Mrs. E. J. Richmond"
- Genres: novels; children's literature; biographies
- Notable works: The Jewelled Serpent; Woman, First and Last, and What She has Done

Euphemia Johnson Richmond (née Guernsey; pen names, Effie Johnson and Mrs. E. J. Richmond; July 28, 1825 – February 9, 1918) was an American author of novels, children's literature, and temperance writings. Born in New York, she began her literary career contributing poems and sketches to periodicals under the pen name "Effie Johnson" before publishing numerous works under the name "Mrs. E. J. Richmond". Her publications included temperance fiction, moral tales, and popular novels such as The McAllisters, Anna Maynard, The Jewelled Serpent, and Woman, First and Last, and What She has Done. Over the course of her career. She produced more than a dozen widely read volumes, particularly popular in the southern United States. Richmond spent most of her life in New York, where she balanced her literary activity with family and religious commitments.

== Early life and education ==
Euphemia Johnson Guernsey was born near Mount Upton, New York, July 28, 1825. Her father, Dr. Jonathan Guernsey (1890–1853), was a native of New Hampshire. Her mother was Frances (1799–1877), a daughter of Dr. Elijah Putnam, a relative of the Revolutionary hero. On both sides, her ancestors were professional and literary people. Richmond's siblings were: Caroline (b. 1821), Phebe (b. 1823), Theodore (b. 1827), Addison (1829), George (b. 1830), Henry (b. 1833), Augustus (b. 1835), Francis (b. 1839).

She received good schooling and became an omnivorous reader.

== Career ==
Richmond's literary talents were shown at an early age. In spite of all the responsibilities of her home life, she found time to jot down her thoughts in rhyme or prose. Her first poem and prose sketch was published in The Ladies' Repository (Cincinnati). She contributed poems to the New-York Tribune . Her story, "The Harwoods", appeared next, and her pen name, "Effie Johnson", began to attract attention. She wrote many sketches under that name. Her later work was under her own name styled as "Mrs. E. J. Richmond".

Since childhood, Richmond was interested in temperance work, and one of her early stories, The McAllisters, was a temperance history based on the lives of persons known to her. The National Temperance Publication Society published that book, with her full name attached, paying for the manuscript. The book was very successful.

The McAllisters

True stories for little people

She published in rapid succession a dozen or more books, among which were Anna Maynard, The King's Daughter, Roy's Wife, How Sandy Came to His Fortune, Dividing of the Ways, The Jewelled Serpent, Harry the Prodigal, The Fatal Dower, Alice Grant, Rose Clifton, Woman, First and Last, and What She has Done (in two volumes), Drifting and Anchored, The Two Paths, Hope Raymond, Aunt Chloe, and Illustrated Scripture Primer. Her many volumes were widely read, especially in the southern States.

== Personal life ==
On August 5, 1846, in Guilford, New York, she married Orson Richmond (1824–1904). They had three children: Catharina (b. 1848), Mary (b. 1850), and Nelson (b. 1857).

Richmond was a member of the Methodist church. She made her home in Mount Upton, New York, where she died February 9, 1918.

== Selected works ==
- The Harwoods, or, The secret of happiness, 1857
- The McAllisters, 1871
- Adopted, 1872
- The Jewelled Serpent, a Study of To-day, 1872
- Zoa Rodman, or, The broken engagement, 1874
- The two paths, 1875
- Harry, the prodigal, 1878
- Drifting and anchored, 1880
- Woman, First and Last, and What She has Done, 1887
- In the fire : and other fancies, 1892
- True stories for little people, from the Book, 1894
- The prince Messiah, 1900
- Fact & fable, 1901
- Grenier cemetery : God's acre 1859–1980
- The Fatal Dower
- Alice Grant
- Rose Clifton
- Hope Raymond
- Aunt Chloe and Her Friends
- Illustrated Scripture Primer
- Anna Maynard
- The King's Daughter
- Roy's Wife
- How Sandy Came to His Fortune
- Dividing of the Ways
