= Elizabeth Caroline Gray =

Scottish historian 1800–1887

Elizabeth Caroline Gray (undated portrait)

Elizabeth Caroline Hamilton Gray (née Johnstone; 3 April 1800 – 21 February 1887) was a Scottish historian and travel author, born in Alva, Clackmannanshire, as the eldest daughter of James Raymond Johnstone and Mary Elizabeth Cholmeley. She was the granddaughter of the colonial businessman John Johnstone.

After marrying John Hamilton Gray, a priest and genealogist, in June 1829, Gray moved to Bolsover Castle in England, where she lived until shortly before her death.

== Research ==
Gray became interested in the history of the Etruscans after visiting an exhibition of their artefacts in London organised by Domenico Campanari in 1837. She pursued the subject on a visit to Italy in 1837–1839, drawing on contacts in German and Italian archaeological circles. In 1840 she published Tour to the Sepulchres of Etruria, which served as a travelogue and an account of her archaeological research. She then wrote a general History of Etruria: the first two volumes in 1843–1844 and the third in 1868.

As a woman, Hamilton Gray faced criticism for engaging in historical research. In an 1844 review of her work, Samuel Ferguson remarked that "any deep or earnest investigation of matters connected with the social institution of a gentile nation is not properly within the female province." This review was sometimes mistakenly attributed to the explorer George Dennis, who also wrote about the Etruscans.

Other than her research on Etruria, Gray wrote a work on the classical and early medieval church and empire, and two popular children's histories of Rome. She and her husband maintained a collection of antiquities acquired both from dealers in Italy and from her own excavations. It included an unusual red-and-black Etruscan amphora in an Italo-Geometric style, known as the "Hamilton Gray vase".

Elizabeth Caroline Gray died in London on 21 February 1887.

== Works ==
- Tour to the Sepulchres of Etruria. London: J. Hatchard and Son. 1840. (1843 ed.)
- The History of Etruria. London: J. Hatchard and Son. 1843–68. (Vol. 1, 2, 3)
- History of Rome for Young Persons. London: T. Hatchard. 1847. (1858 ed.)
- Emperors of Rome from Augustus to Constantine: Being a Continuation of the History of Rome. London: T. Hatchard. 1850.
- The Empire and the Church, from Constantine to Charlemagne. Oxford: J. Henry and J. Parker. 1857.
