= The Court and Society Review =

British literary magazine

The Court and Society Review was a British literary magazine published between 1885 and 1888.

== History and profile ==
Founded in July 1885 as The Court and Society Journal, the magazine changed its name to The Court and Society Review with its 1 October 1885 edition. It continued to publish weekly until its last issue on 6 June 1888.

The magazine is most notable for having published works by Oscar Wilde and Robert Louis Stevenson.
