= Alexandre Séon =

French painter

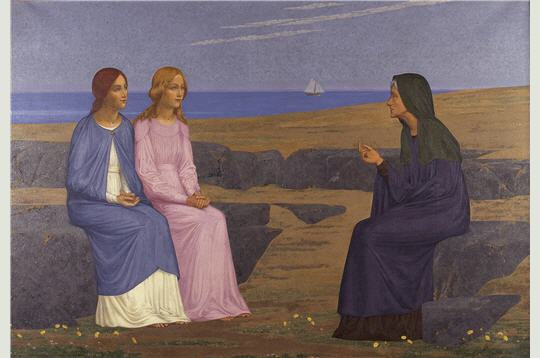
The Story. 1898. Musée de Brest

Alexandre Séon (1855, Chazelles-sur-Lyon, Loire – 1917, Paris) was a French Symbolist artist, illustrator and decorator. Séon studied at the Beaux-Arts of Lyon and Paris, becoming a student of Puvis de Chavannes in 1891, with whom he later collaborated. He was closely associated with Joséphin Péladan and his Salon de la Rose-Croix, and designed the frontispiece for Péladan's 1891 novel l'Androgyne.
