= Nicolae Petrescu Găină =

Romanian cartoonist (1871–1931)

Nicolae Petrescu-Găină
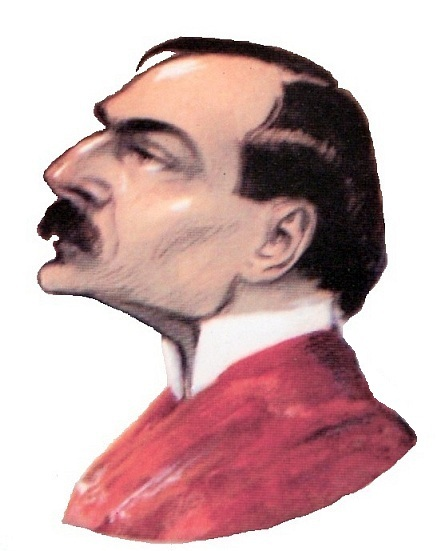
- Autoportret
- Born: March 31, 1871; Craiova, Romania
- Died: February 15, 1931 (aged 59); Bucharest, Romania
- Style: Cartoonist

Nicolae S. Petrescu-Găină (March 31, 1871; Craiova, Romania – February 15, 1931; Bucharest, Romania) was a Romanian cartoonist. There is a park named after him in the Drumul Taberei neighborhood of Bucharest.

== Bibliography ==
- Paul Rezeanu: Caricaturistul N.S. Petrescu-Găină, Editura Alma, Craiova, 2008
- Victoria Ionescu: Albumul „Contimporani” de Nicolae Petrescu Găină, MIM, nr. 1/1964
- (in Romanian)Caricatura militară în presa umoristică românească, de la Unire până la Războiul cel Mare (1859 - 1916) de Horia Vladimir Șerbănescu
