= George Demetrescu Mirea =

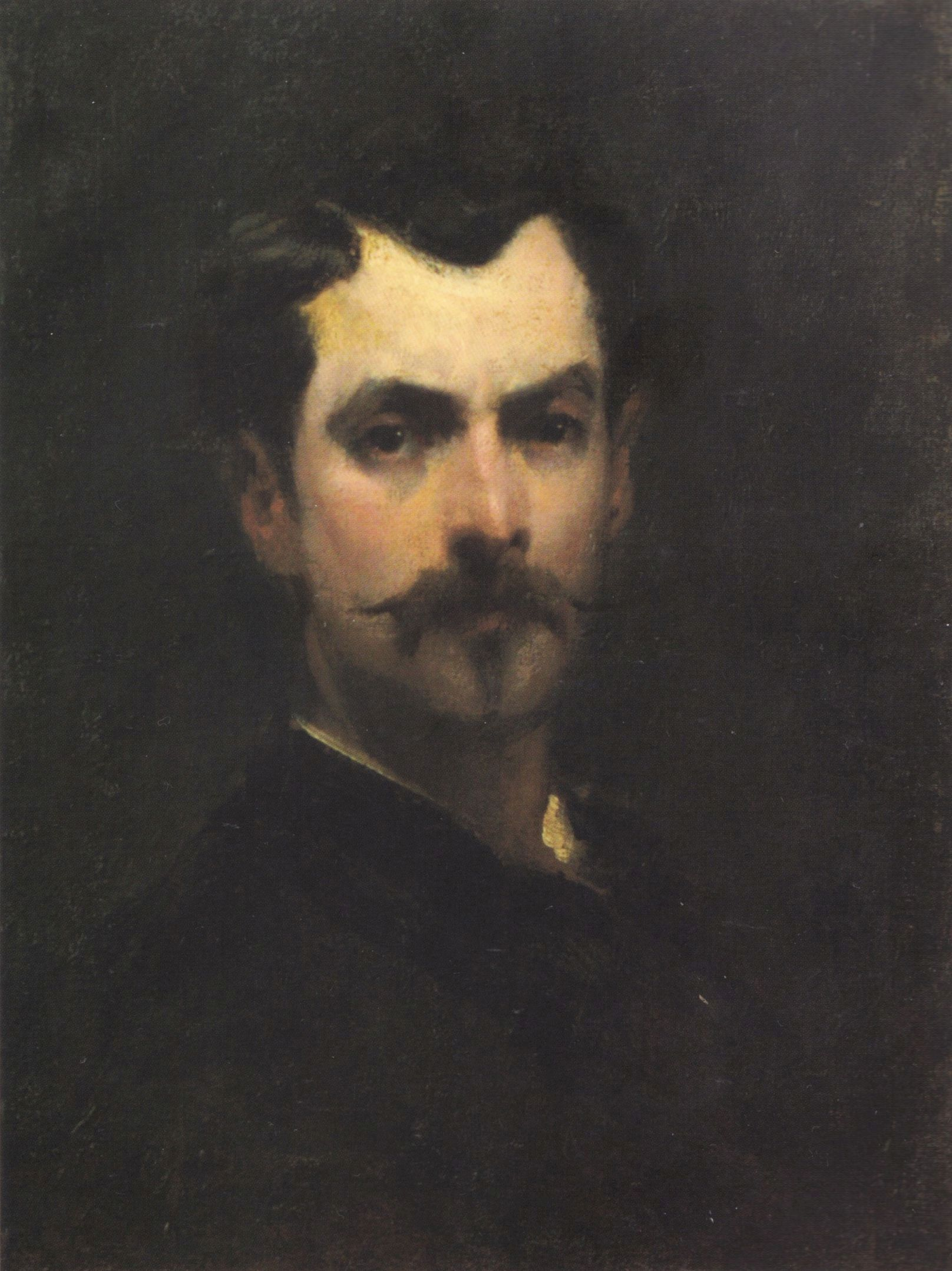
Self-portrait (date unknown)

George Demetrescu Mirea (1852, in Câmpulung – 12 December 1934, in Bucharest) was a Romanian portrait painter, muralist and art teacher.

== Biography ==
He was one of twelve children born to an Archpriest. His first art lessons were at the "Școala Națională de Arte Frumoase" (now the Bucharest National University of Arts) in Bucharest under Theodor Aman. He also studied basic medicine with Dr.Carol Davila. On the doctor's urging, he participated in the Russo-Turkish War (known as the "War of Independence" in Romania), and was attached to army headquarters where he was commissioned to paint military campaign scenes and related subjects.

With the patronage of Ion Ghica, and a recommendation from Nicolae Grigorescu, he was awarded a scholarship to study at the "École des Beaux Arts" in Paris. His primary instructor was Carolus-Duran and he remained there until 1884.

That same year, he was commissioned to provide murals for the Cathedral of Saints Peter and Paul in Constanța, which he executed in conjunction with the architect Ion Mincu. They were, however, destroyed during World War II. From 1887 to 1888, he decorated the "Casa Vernescu" (built in 1820; named after its second owner, George Vernescu, a government Minister); again working with Mincu, who was doing renovations there. Today, the building is a casino and restaurant.

The following year, he became a teacher at the Normal School in Câmpulung. In 1891, he was appointed a Professor at his old alma mater, the "Școala Națională". Eight years later, he became Director, a position he held until 1927.

He also painted murals at the National Bank of Romania and Alexandru Ioan Cuza University. A street near the Arcul de Triumf is named after him.

== Selected paintings ==
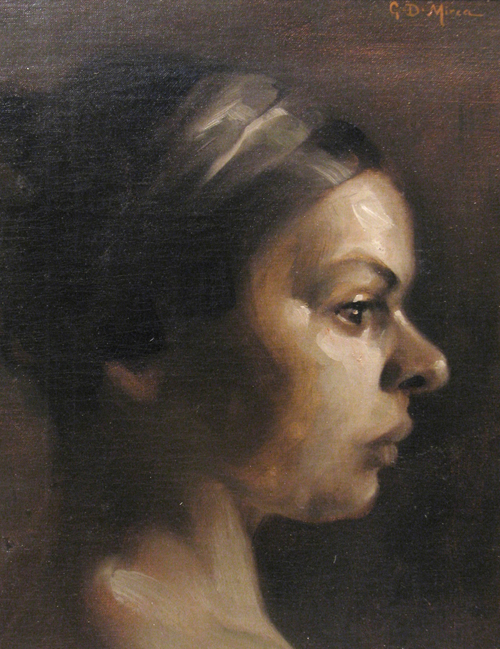
Female Profile

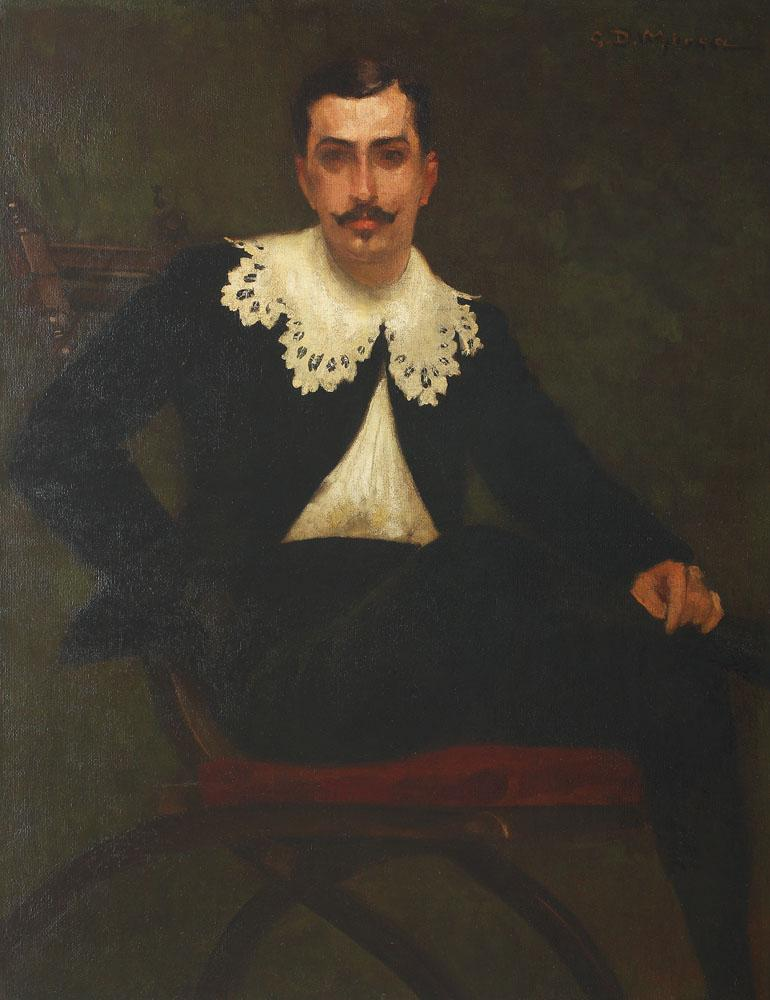
Nicolae Petraşcu
as a "Hidalgo"

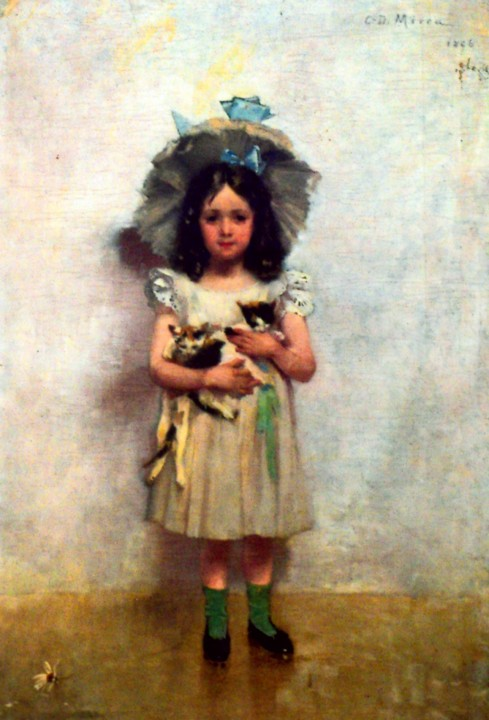
Little Girl with Cats

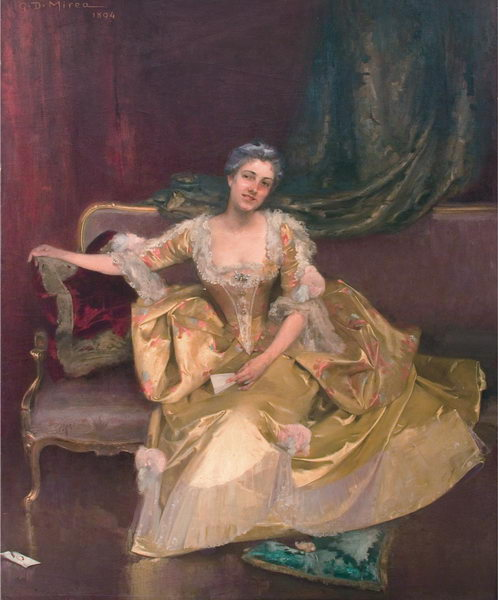
Portrait of his wife in 18th-Century Costume

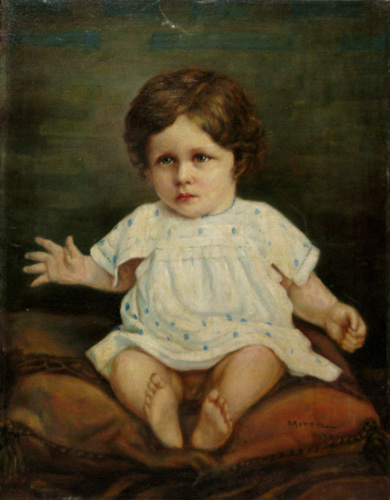
A Baby, Sitting
