= Corneliu Ionescu =

Romanian painter (born 1956)

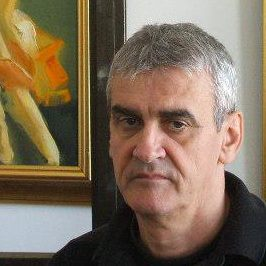
- Ionescu in 2012
- Born: 20 February 1956 (age 70); Pitești, Argeș County, Romania
- Education: Sorin Ilfoveanu, Zamfir Dumitrescu, Gheorghe Șaru, Ștefan Câlția
- Known for: Painting
- Movement: Post-Impressionism, Expressionism
- Awards: 2004 - Cultural Merit Order (Romania)

Corneliu Ionescu (born 20 February 1956) is a Romanian painter, famous for his ballerinas.

He was born in Pitești, Argeș County. He attended the Bucharest National University of Arts in the class of Gheorghe Șaru. He was trained by the painters Sorin Ilfoveanu, Zamfir Dumitrescu, Gheorghe Șaru, Ștefan Câlția.

== Images ==
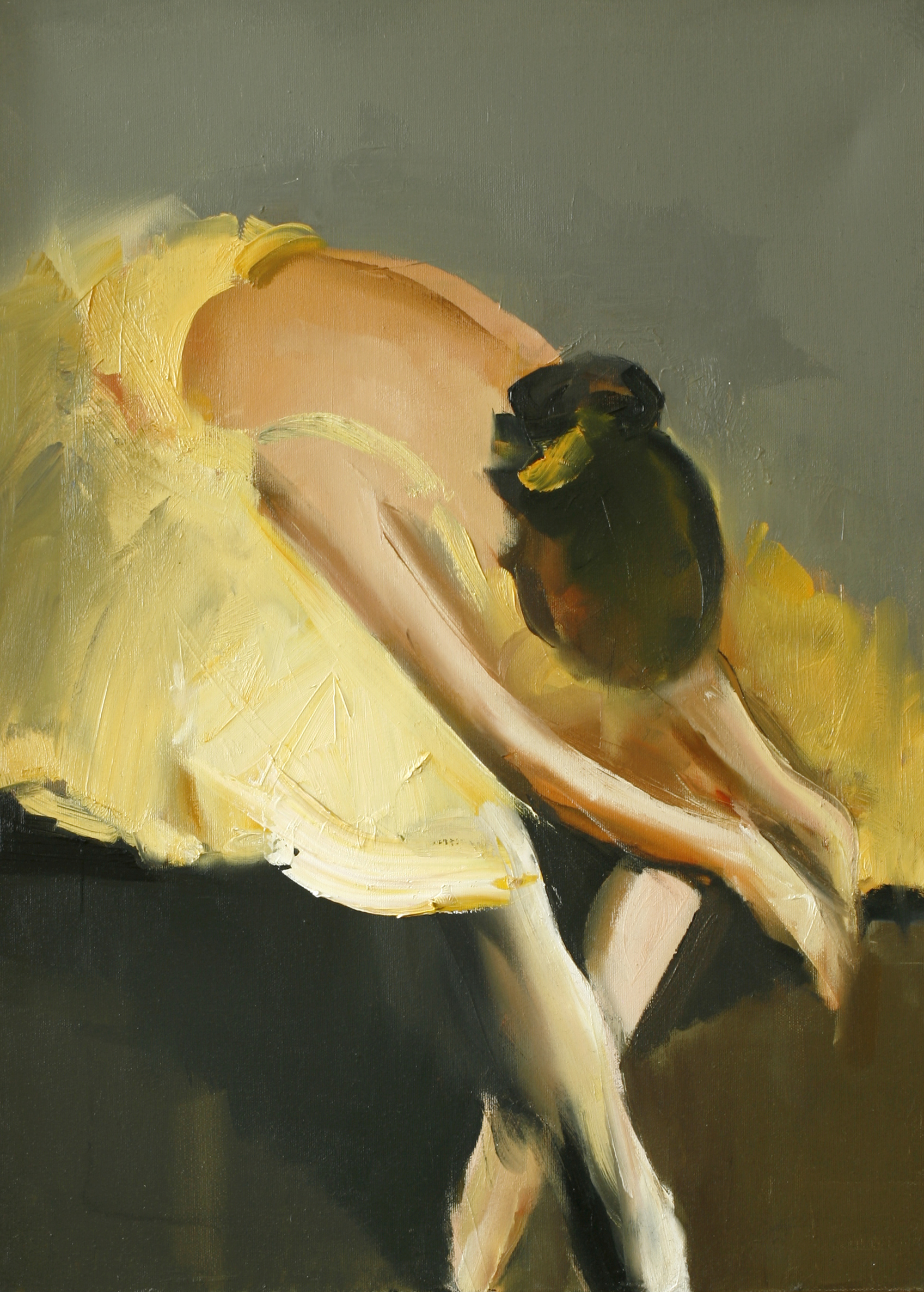

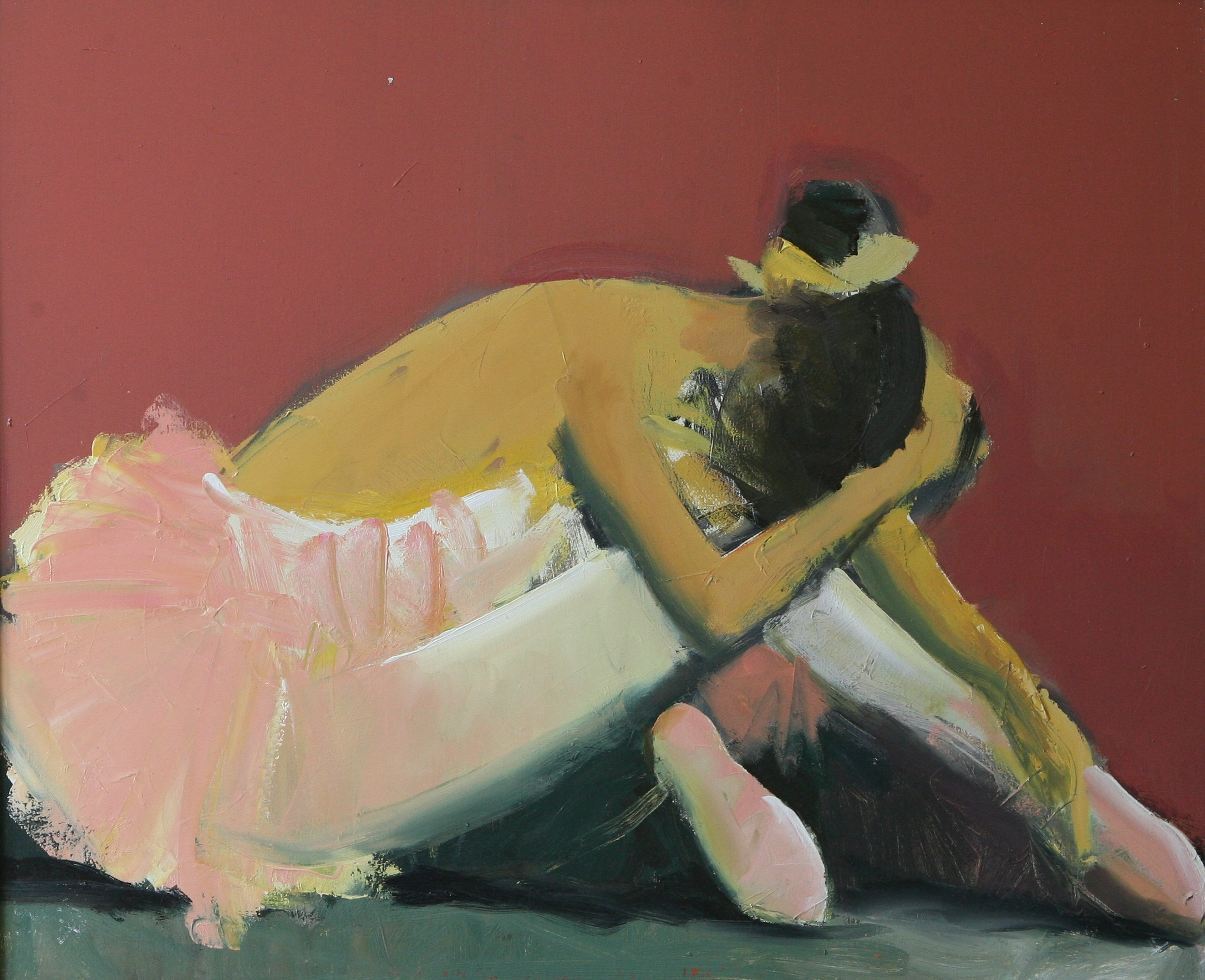

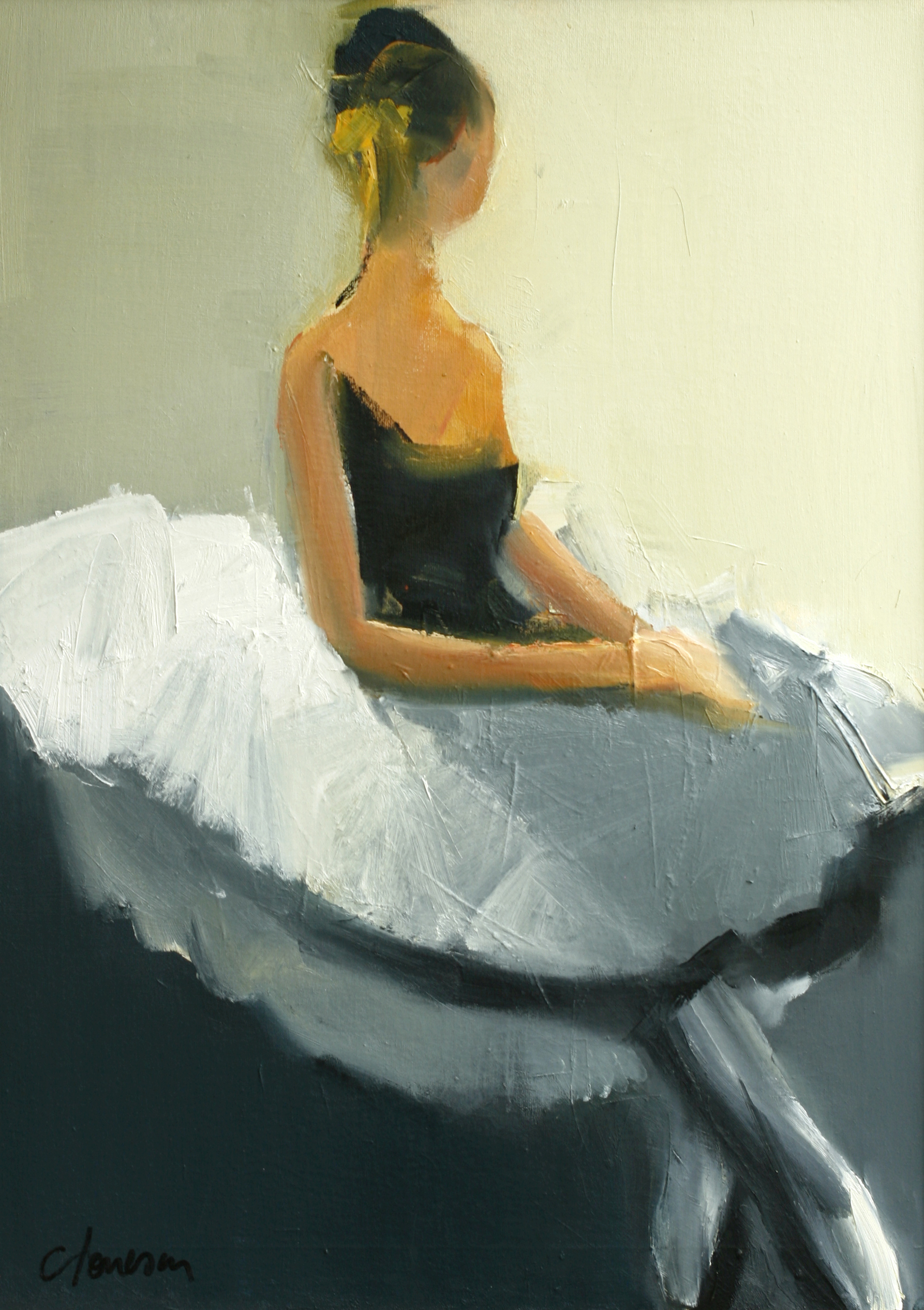

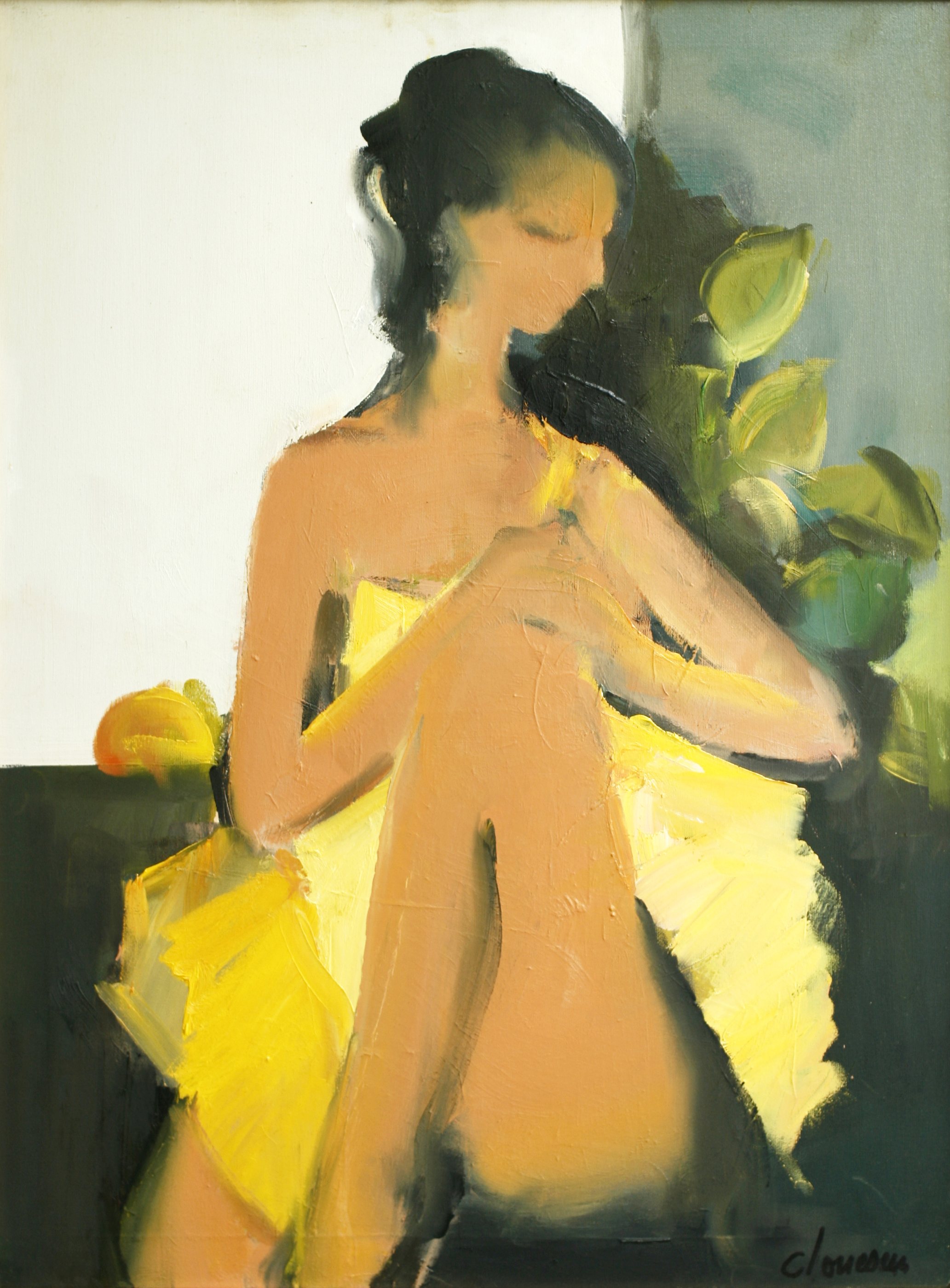

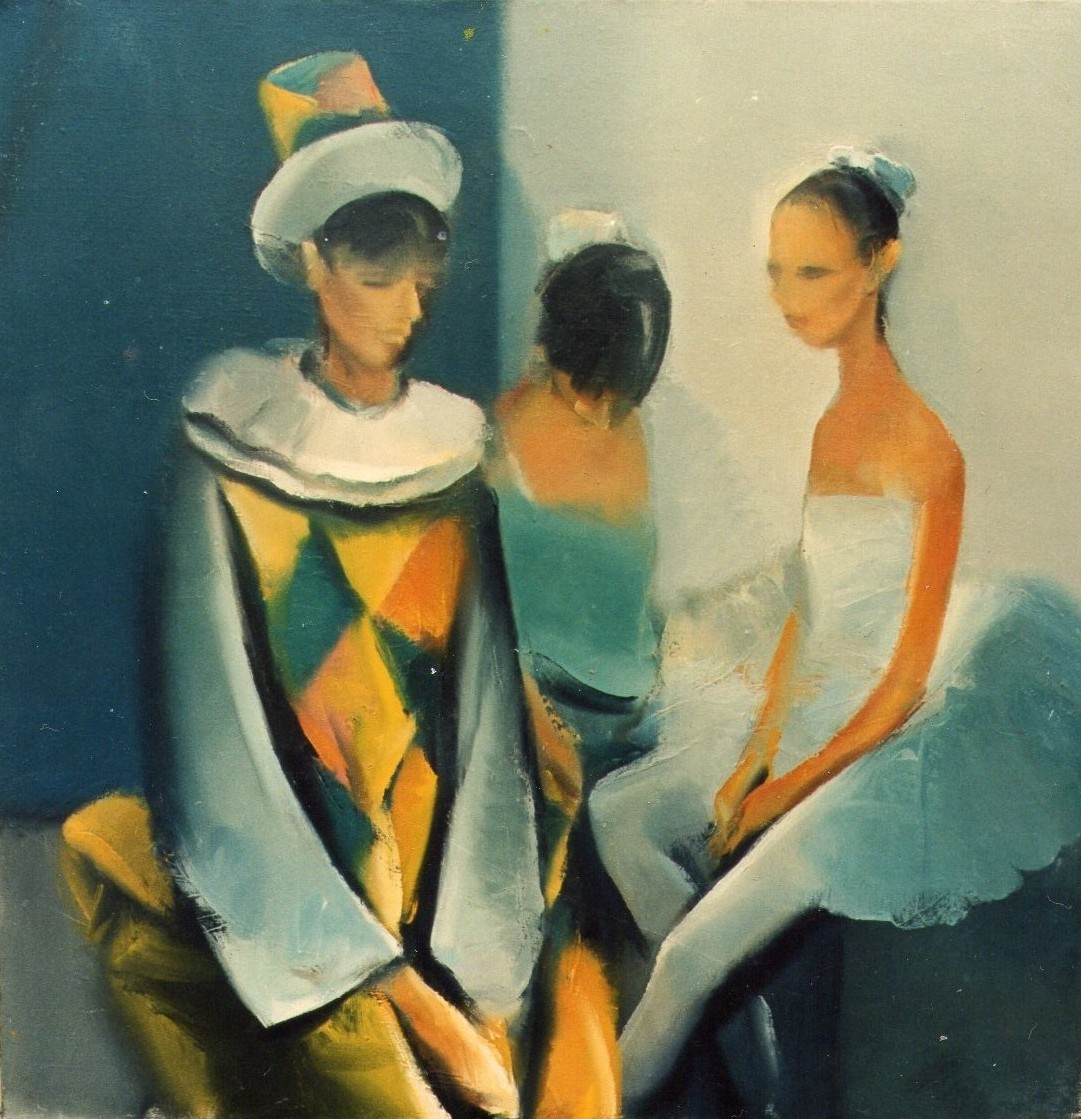

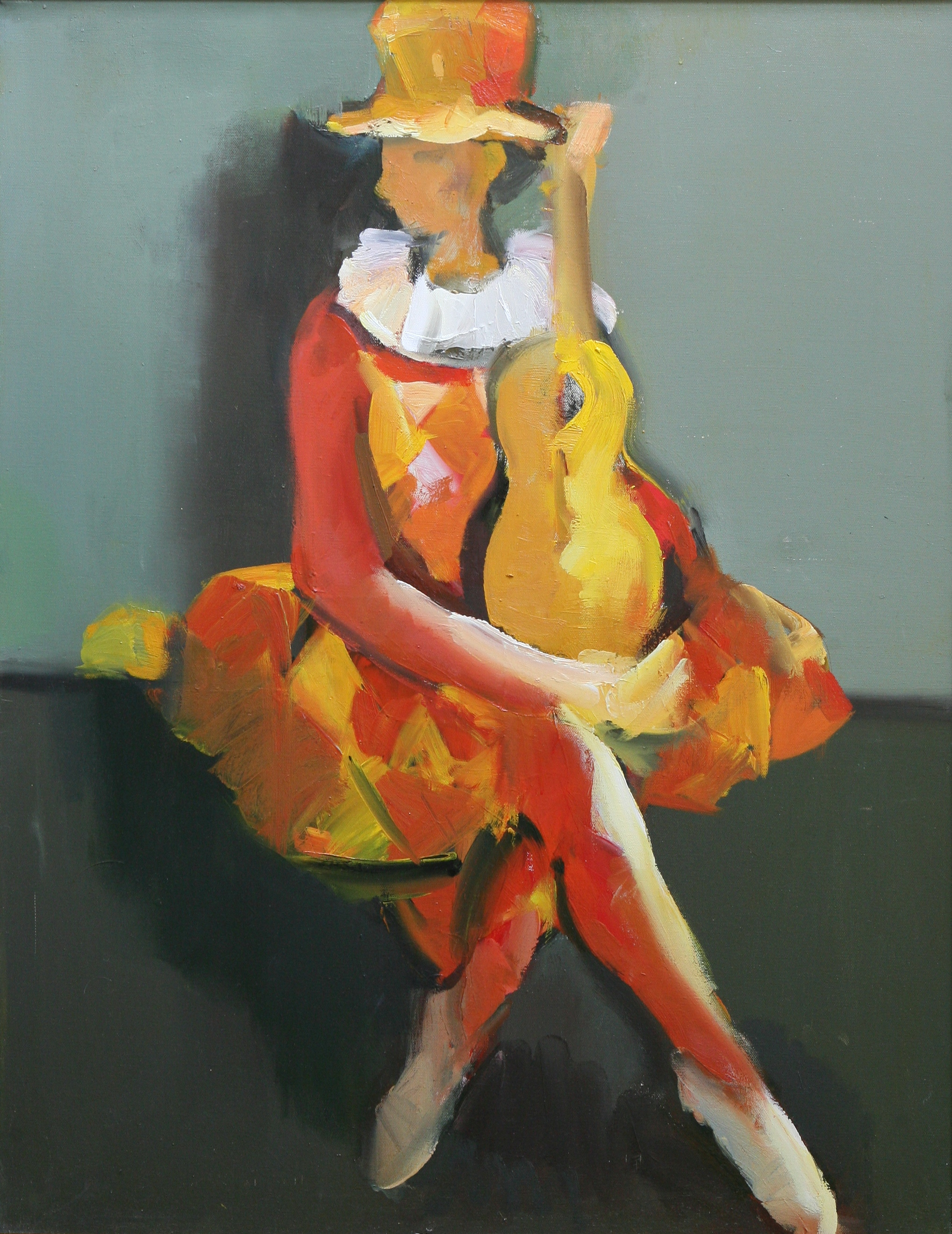

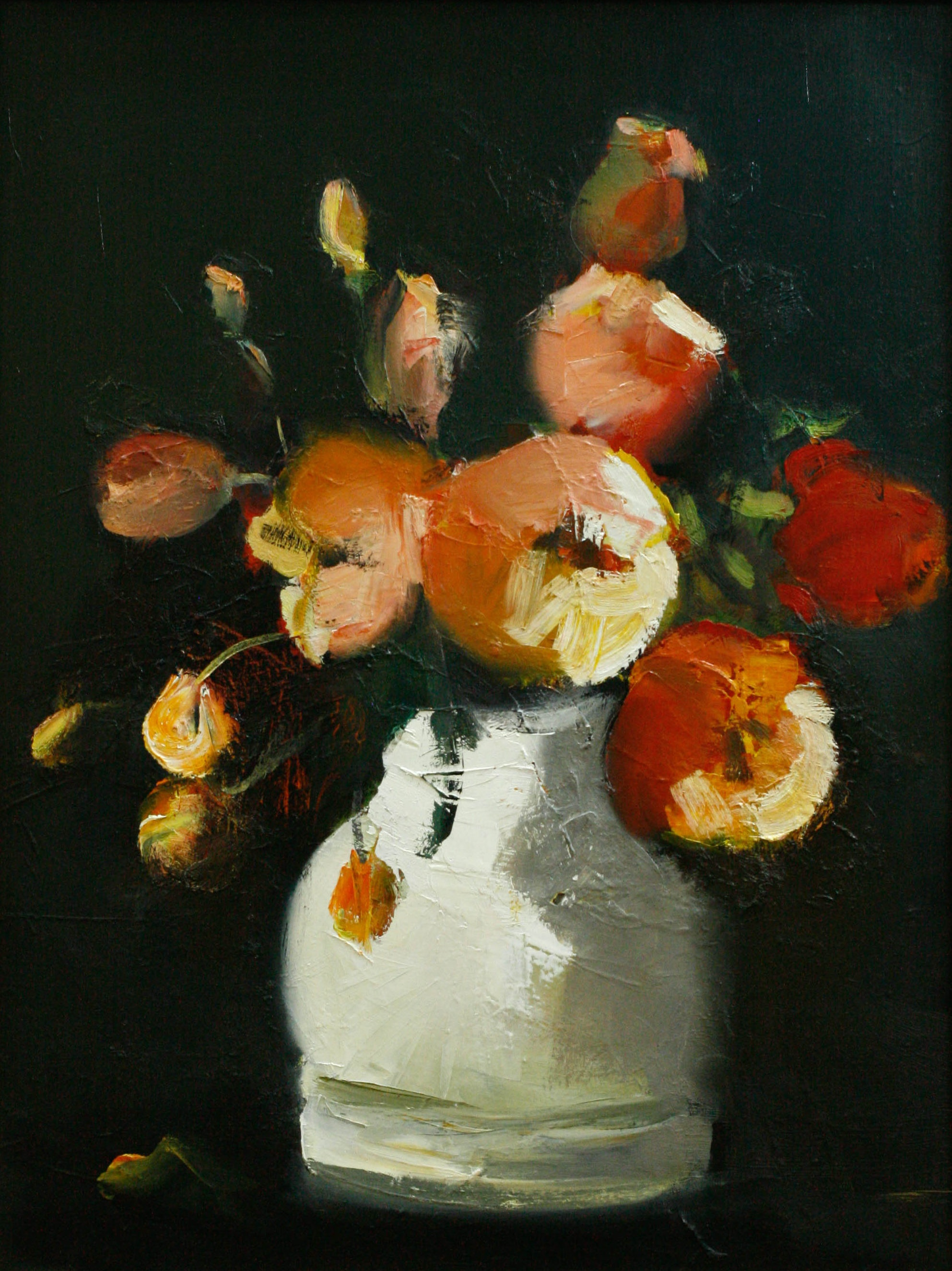

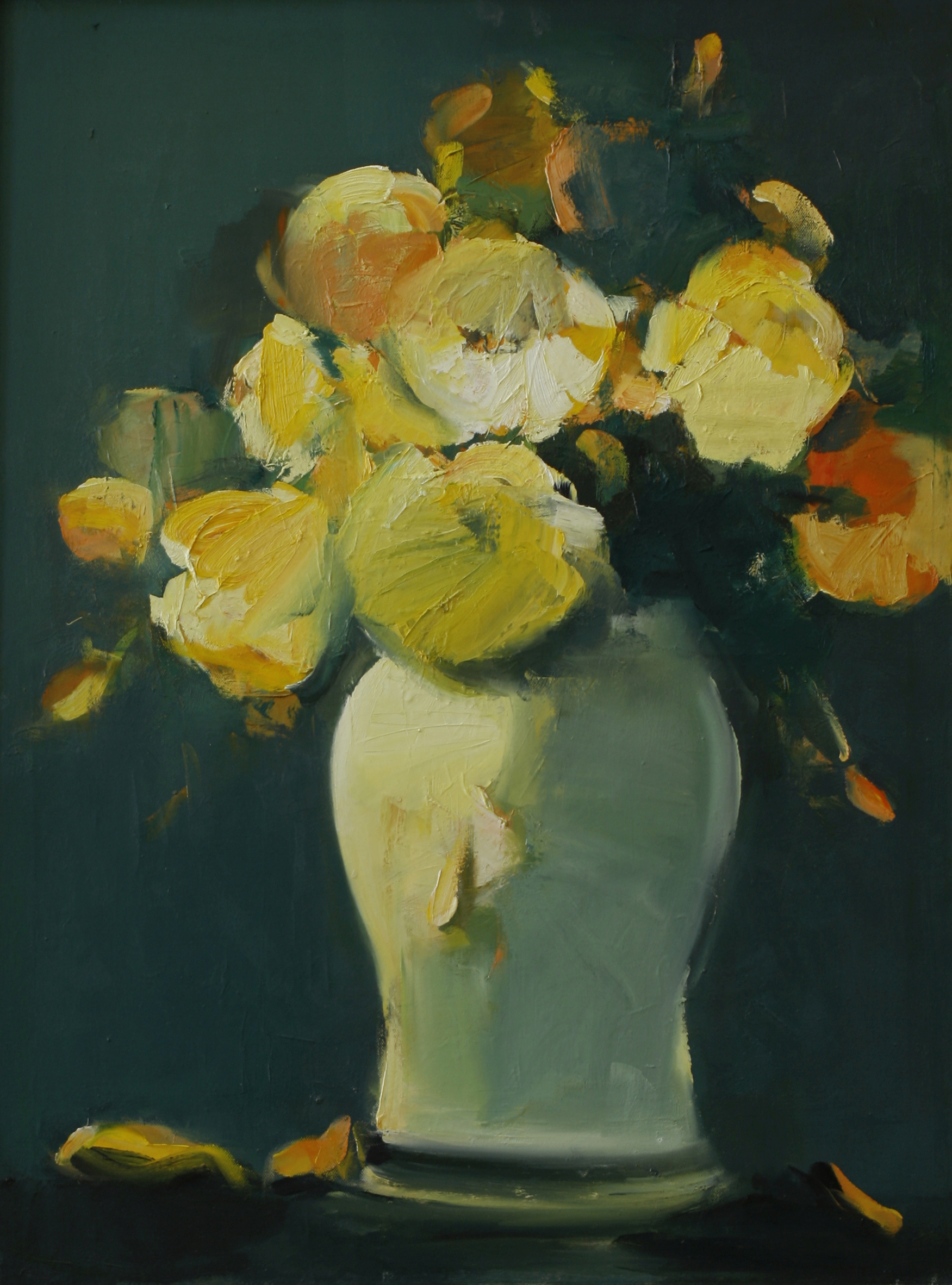

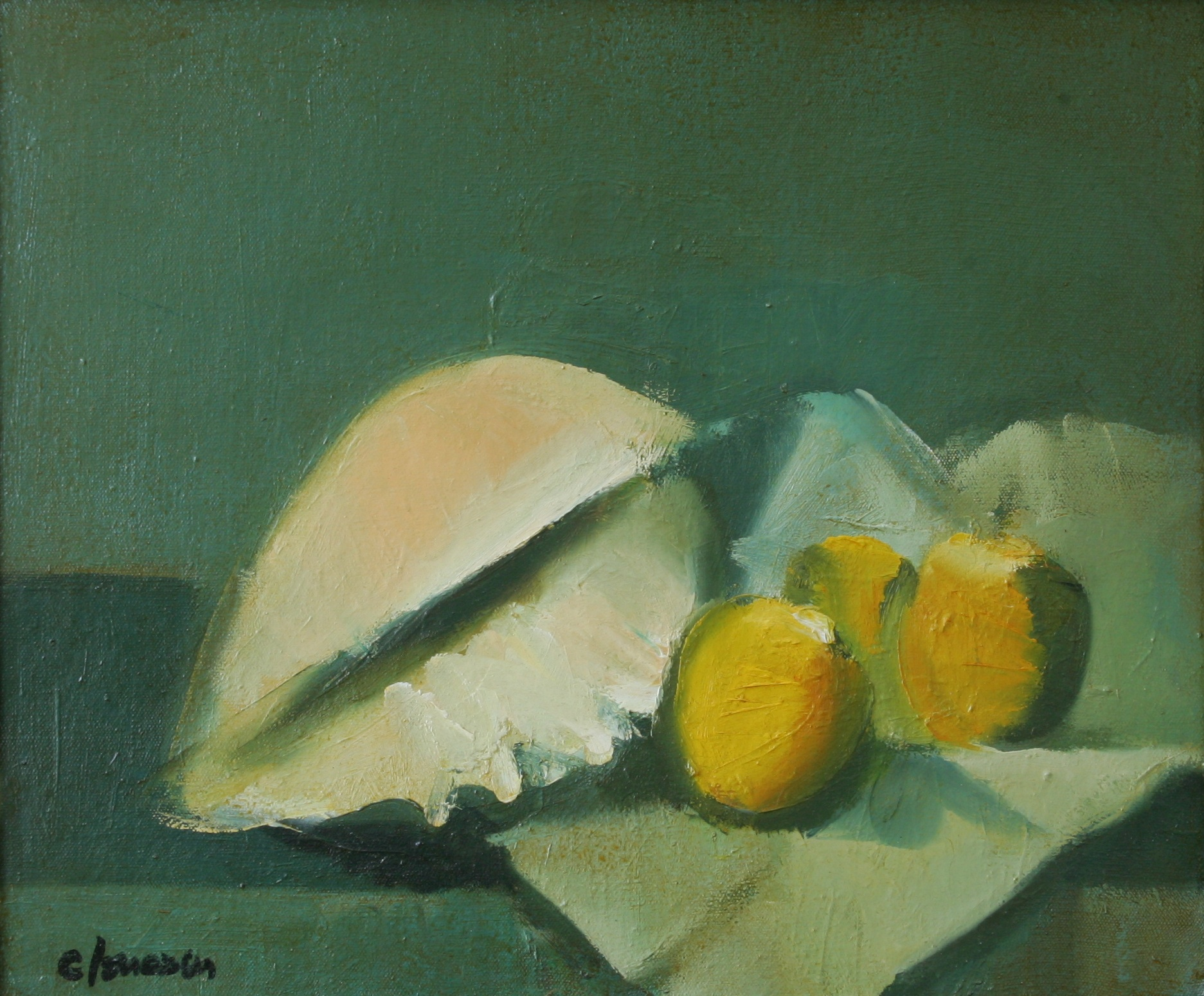

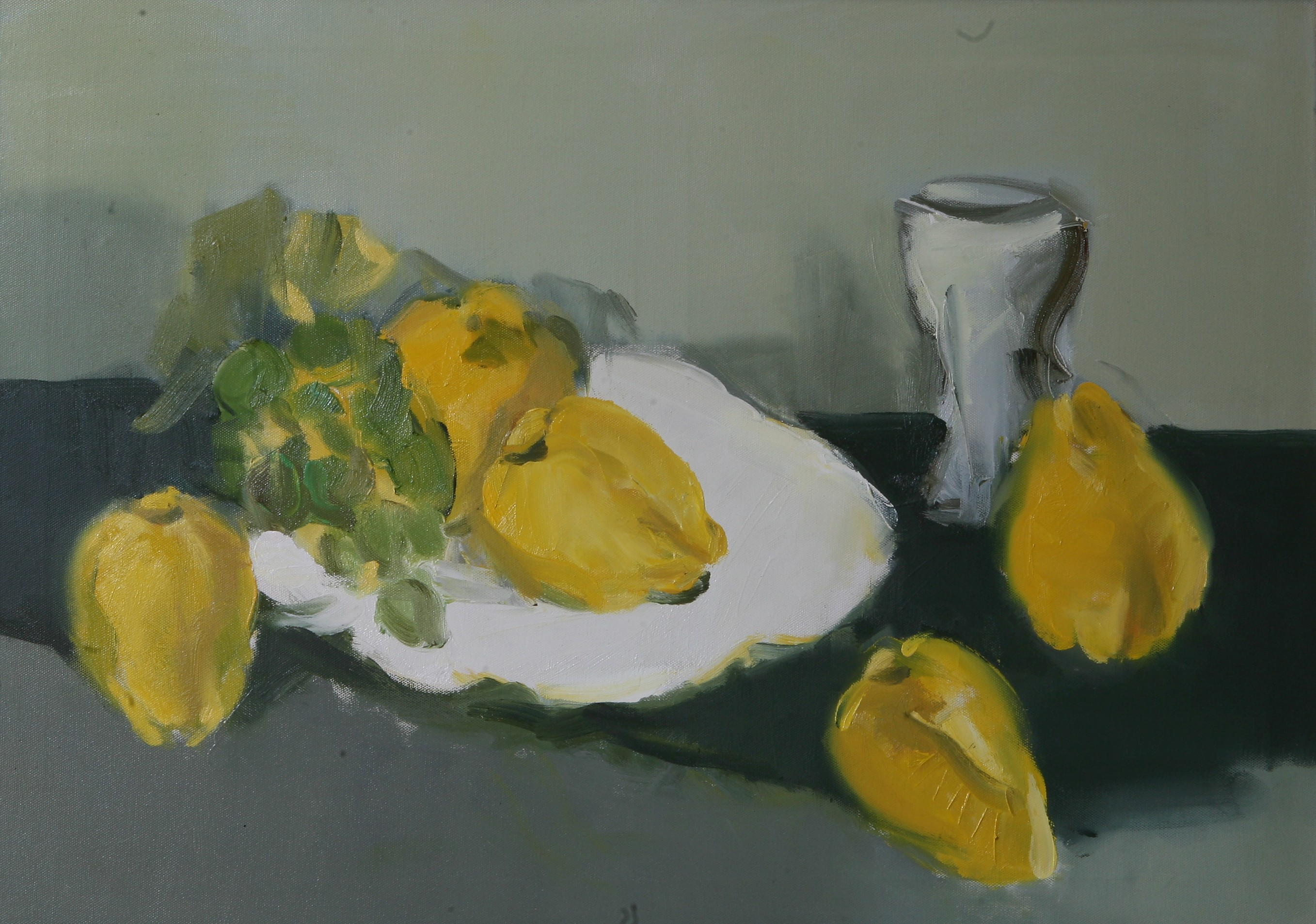

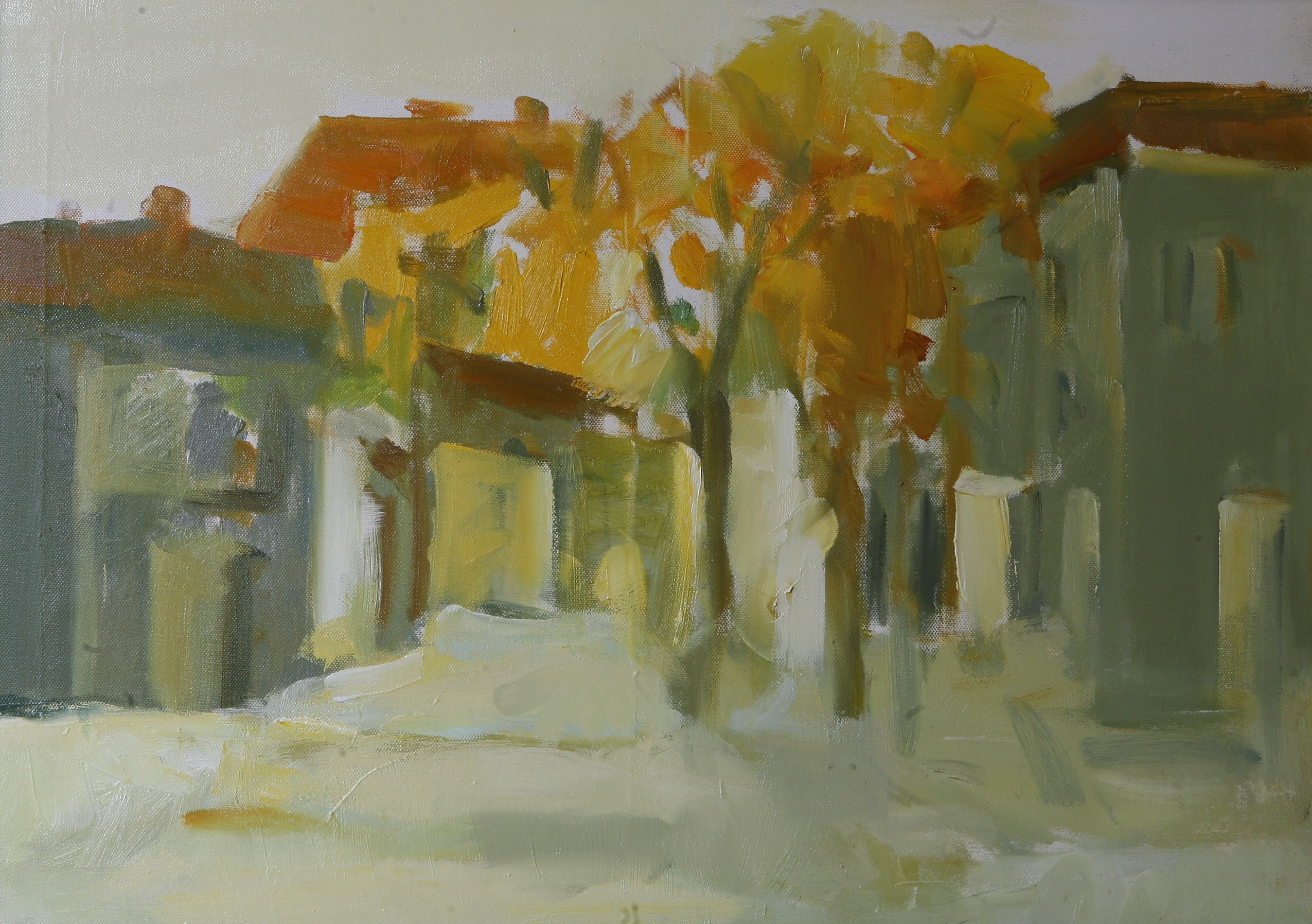

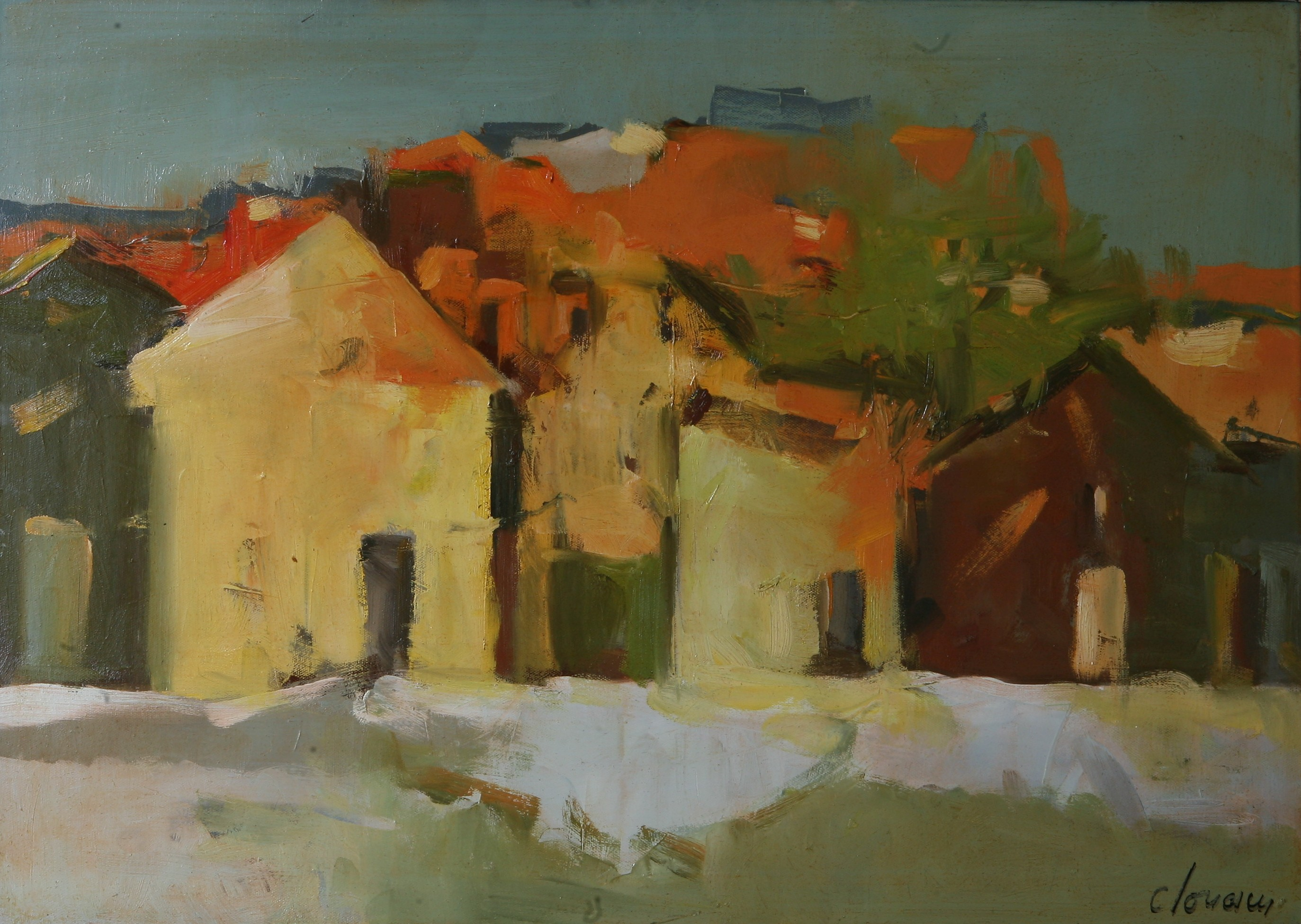

== Bibliography ==
- Corneliu Ostahie - Martor vizual, Editura Detectiv - Artă, București, 2013, ISBN 978-973-1857-73-2
- Enciclopedia artiștilor români contemporani, Editura Arc, București, Volumul III, 2000, ISBN 9789739971706
