= Henry Mavrodin =

Romanian artist (1937–2022)

Henry Mavrodin (31 July 1937 – 17 May 2022) was a Romanian painter, designer, essayist, and university teacher. He was born in Bucharest, Romania, on 31 July 1937, and died on 17 May 2022, at the age of 84.

== Formation ==
- 1953–1957 Secondary School of Fine Arts – Bucharest, Romania
- 1957–1963 attends the courses of the Bucharest National University of Arts, in the class of master Corneliu Baba

== University activity ==
- 1991–2001 Professor at the Bucharest National University of Arts (gave courses on drawing and painting).
- 1996–2001 Dean of the Faculty of Theory and History of Art at the University of Fine Arts in Bucharest.
- 2001–2006 Professor at National University of Theatre and Film in Bucharest
- 1996–1999 PhD in the aesthetics of visual arts with the Glaucon thesis or the prestige of the artist in the Ideal City

== Personal exhibitions ==
- 1971 Galleria Internazionale d'arte La chiocciola/La chiocciola International Art Gallery Padova, Italy.
- 1972 Galleria d'arte Viotti, Turin, Italy /Viotti Art Gallery, Turin, Italy.
- 1975 Retrospective at the University Cultural Center, Pordenone, Italy.
- 1989 20 years of painting in Italy, Castle in Bazzano, Bazzano city under the patronage of City, Civic and Archaeological Museum, Bazzano, Italy.
- 1998 National Museum of Arts of Romania, Bucharest.
- 1998 Mavrodin and his students, Catacomb Gallery, Bucharest.
- 1999 Morandi Museum, Bologna, Italy.
- 2005 Exhibition of Henry Mavrodin donation to Moderna Museet, Stockholm, Sweden

== Group exhibitions ==
- 1963 Corneliu Baba class promotion exhibition, Dalles Hall, Bucharest.
- 1967 Commemorative exhibition The International Colloquium C. Brancusi, Bucharest, Romania.
- 1966 Group exhibition at Casa Scriitorilor of Bucharest
- 1969 1st International Exhibition of Painting at CagnessurMer, France (prize for Romanian artists).
- 1970 Apollo Gallery, Bucharest.
- 1970 the 35th International Biennale of Arts in Venice, Italy.
- 1974 Represented Italy at the 1st International Exhibition of Glass, Brussels, Belgium.
- 1977 20th International Quadrennial Exhibition, Rome, Italy.
- 1996 Commemorative group exhibition entitled 100 Year Anniversary of the Birth of Tristan Tzara, Bucharest, Dalles exhibition hall.
- 1996 Romanian Arts of the '90s. UnaBisanzio Latina Galleria Bramante, Rome, Italy.
- 1998 Bucarest 2000 Budapest, an exhibition of Romanian contemporary art in Budapest, Hungary.
- 1999 Relationship and heritage exhibition, organized by the Ministry of Culture in Romania and the European Council Kalinderu Hall, Bucharest, Romania.
- 2002 Opere del 900, The Luigi Spazzapan Gallery of Contemporary Art, Gradiscad'Isonzo, Gorizia, Italy.
- 2009 Exhibition Ciubotaru & Mavrodin - object (room Theodor Pallady, Romanian Academy) and the Tower of Babel donation monumental work, the Romanian Academy, financed by Fildas Art

== Awards and orders ==
- 1967 The 3rd National Prize for Painting (The Union of Professional Artists in Bucharest, Romania).
- 1968 First Prize, the Golden Medal, at the 1968 International Book Fair, Bucharest, Romania.
- 1968 The 3rd National Prize for Painting (The Union of Professional Artists in Bucharest, Romania).
- 1969 International Festival of Painting Prize Cagnes sur Mer in France (Romanian Pavilion Award).
- 2005 Order of the Star of Italian Solidarity with the rank of Commander, awarded by the President of Italy
- 2015 Grand Prize from the Romanian Fine Artists’ Union (Bucharest, Romania)

== Works in museums ==
- Museum of Contemporary Art, Moderna Museet in Stockholm, Sweden

== About art of Henry Mavrodin ==
Radu Cornel Constantinescu described Mavrodin's art as "strange, troubling, provocative in respect of time and surroundings" and indicated Mavrodin's "natural pride in the creative professions (only public servants and others of their kind have a claim on mediocrity), and equally natural humility towards the great landmarks in the history of art, which he fatally dreams of achieving and equalling." Mavrodin referenced European paintings of the past in his work and considered the values and questions they evoked.

Art critic Giuseppe Marchiori noted Mavrodin's affinity for solitude and calm, citing Mavrodin's independence from contemporary artistic trends and his move to the island of Murano. Furthermore, Marchiori states that "For the paintings of Mavrodin are composed of dreams from outside time, reconstructed in the space of the painting, with the technical authority worthy of an old Fleming (...) Among the multiple aspects of the multiple revival of figurative realism, the magical evocations of Mavrodin's painting deserve to be considered in a light of their own for their solitude and the quality of the authentic poetic vocation.''

== Bibliography ==
- Eugenio Riccòmini, Henry Mavrodin Catalogo, Rocca dei Bentivoglio, Bazzano, 1989/ Exposition Catalog The Bentivoglio Castel, Bazzano, Italy, 1989
- The old law of Lavoisier, Italian-Romanian bilingual edition, Aspasia FM Editore, Bologna, Italy/Vechea lege a lui Lavoisier, ediţie bilingvă italiană-română, Aspasia F.M. Editore, Bologna, Italy, 1992
- Essay on drawing, F.M. Editore, Bologna, Italy, 1996/Saggio sul disegno, F.M. Editore, Bologna, Italy, 1996.
- 1998 Mavrodin, albumul expoziţiei de la Muzeul Naţional de Artă al României, Aspasia, Bologna, Italy.
- 1999 Mavrodin, albumul expoziţiei de la Muzeul Morandi din Bologna, Aspasia, Bologna, Italy.
- 1999 Platon şi creştinismul, "Revista de filosofie", Editura Academiei Române, 1999.
- 2000 Glaocon sau prestigiul artistului în Cetatea Ideală, Editura Paidea, București, Romania.
- 2002 Laudatio, în volumul colectiv, Omagiu Dan Grigorescu la 70 de ani, Ex Ponto, Constanţa, 2002, pp. 17-18.
- 2007 Album Henry Mavrodin, Editura Institutului Cultural Roman, coordinator Ileana Stănculescu;
- 2009 Gemenele vitrege. Eseuri, comunicări, interviuri, evocări, scrisori, Editura Paideia, București, 208 pag.
- 2009 Catalogul expoziţiei Ciubotaru & Mavrodin Masterprint, 66 pag (sala Theodor Pallady, Biblioteca Academiei Române), sub patronajul Academiei Române, Fildas Art.
- 2008 Ateliere de artişti din București, Ed. Noimediaprint, Henry Mavrodin- pp. 82–87, coordinator Mihai Oroveanu;
- 2003 Dan Grigorescu, Dicţionarul avangardelor, Henry Mavrodin pp. 425-426, Editura Enciclopedică;
