= Julius Podlipny =

Austro-Hungarian-born Czechoslovak and Romanian artist

Julius or Iulius Podlipny (most common renditions of the Slovak: Július Podlipný; Czech: Julius Podlipný; Hungarian: Podlipny Gyula; Romanian: Iuliu Podlipny; April 12, 1898 – January 15, 1991) was an Austro-Hungarian-born Czechoslovak and Romanian artist, best known for his work in drawing and his long period as teacher at the Art Lyceum in Timișoara. First acknowledged as a promoter of modern art during the interwar period, Podlipny was a contributor to the avant-garde and socialist magazine Ma, edited by Hungarian critic and promoter Lajos Kassák.

Having adopted a style which echoed Expressionism, he influenced Romanian art mainly as a pedagogue: among the critically acclaimed contemporary painters to have been inspired by his views is Ștefan Câlția. Podlipny's widow, Annemarie Podlipny-Hehn, is an art and literary critic. Part of her research is dedicated to her husband's artistic contributions.

== Biography ==
Of Slovak origin, but also honoured in the context of Czech culture, Podlipny was born in Pressburg, Austria-Hungary (today Bratislava, Slovakia). His childhood was marked by two train accidents: the first, at age six, during which he lost his right arm; the second, occurring three years later, killed his father. With his mother Renata and his eight siblings, he wandered through Central Europe, moving between Pressburg and Budapest.

Like many in the avant-garde environment, Podlipny began flirting with socialism, and played some part in the European revolutions of the 1910s. As historian Victor Neumann writes, "his political orientation had been left-wing, and it sometimes slid into the far left". Art critic Pavel Șușară completes the image: young Podlipny was "moved by the suffering of others, fascinated by risk and hunted by police".

During the early 1920s, Podlipny studied at the Hungarian Art Academy, which saw him joining the Central European modern art movement. He made his first visits to the Romanian Kingdom, having earned scholarships to attend the Baia Mare School. In 1926, he made Timișoara his permanent residence.

In Timișoara, where he taught draftsmanship, Podlipny led the Free School of Painting before joining the teaching staff at the Decorative Art School (later restructured as the Art Lyceum). During the following period, he was associated with Hungarian-language avant-garde magazine Ma, published in Vienna by the socialist artist Kassák. Literary critics Cornel Ungureanu and Paul Cernat note that the links created between Ma and the Bucharest-based magazine Contimporanul, centered on the friendship between their two editors, Kassák and Ion Vinea, may also have involved a loose group of supporters from Timișoara. Alongside Podlipny, they were ethnic Romanian politico Aurel Buteanu and German poet and anarchist activist Robert Reiter, together with the Hungarian writers Rodion Markovits and Károly Endre.

At the time, Podlipny's art was a sample of Romanian Expressionism, focusing especially on depicting images of suffering, marginality and despair, including portraits of physically disabled people, or landscapes seemingly painted in absolute solitude. Writing in 1931, critic G. Stoienescu sampled two of Podlipny's characteristic subjects: a group of "crippled pilgrims", "obsessed by a vision", huddled in front of their "tin Christ"; and "a traveller and his gentle beasts of burden", going about their business inside "an unreal world."

During World War II, while still residing in Romania, Podlipny elected to become a national of the Slovak Republic. He represented that short-lived state at a 1942 propaganda exhibit, attended by officials of the Ion Antonescu regime, where he exhibited charcoal drawings landscapes and rural scenes. He was still in Timișoara when Romania left the Axis powers and Slovakia disappeared. A visitor of his 1946 exhibit noted: "With his only arm, the left one, Iuliu Podlipny has produced haunting graphics, where shadows fraternise with the light, and destiny with man and with God."

After the establishment of the Romanian communist regime, and especially in the 1960s and '70s, Julius Podlipny focused on his work as an educator, helping to create a distinct and critically acclaimed artistic trend among Banat youth, and creating a bridge between early modern art and postwar tendencies. In the 1950s, he married Annemarie Hehn. The daughter of middle-class Swabian parents, she had been a displaced person during the final stage of the war, before being employed as an art historian for the Banat Museum. An amateur artist herself, she met her future husband through her two sisters, who took drawing lessons from Podlipny. In 2008, she recalled: "following my marriage and through my work at the Banat Museum art section, I 'submerged' myself in the field of fine arts, and thus I could more easily bear the communist dictatorship." One of her two sisters, Ilse Hehn-Guzun, also became a noted artist.

Podlipny contributed significantly to the artistic development of his students. According to Neumann, "[h]e was [...] a person with formative knowledge, some of the best-received Romanian artists being indebted to his school." The latter category, Neumann indicates, was primarily illustrated by Ștefan Câlția. Podlipny was also the teacher of Roman Cotoșman, Paul Neagu, Dietrich Sayler, Traian Brădean and Constantin Flondor.

Several texts by Annemarie Podlipny-Hehn, including a monograph, deal with her husband's work and its context. Discussing these writings, Cornel Ungureanu writes: "To understand the Austro-Hungarian empire with its left-wing movements, to understand the crepuscular art of Central Europe, Mrs. Podlipny shows, is impossible unless we carefully follow the evolution of esteemed Timoșoarans, among whom the most important one in her studies is still Julius Podlipny." In 1998, Podlipny was posthumously granted the title of honorary citizen of Timișoara. A street in the city was renamed in his honour.

== Style and influence ==
Podlipny's style was developed under the influence of Central European currents. Writer Livius Ciocârlie, who was active on Timișoara's cultural scene at the same time as Cotoșman and was an acquaintance of Podlipny's, describes the latter as "an interesting Expressionist". According to Șușară, Podlipny remains one of Romania's "most fascinating", a "typical" character of Mitteleuropa, with "baroque dichotomies" and "Expressionistic paroxysm". Adrian Maniu, the Expressionist poet and art chronicler, included Podlipny to the great painters under "accursed spells", as one who moved freely between "genius and insanity".

Podlipny's approach to art and his views on life had a sizable impact on his pupils' careers. In particular, Neumann writes, the artist made himself known for imposing discipline, and for familiarising young artists with mixed media techniques. Ștefan Câlția credits Podlipny and Corneliu Baba with having instilled in him a "respect for school" that replaced his initial "rather nonconformist" approach to art training. He also recalled Podlipny telling his students that "the most important thing we have been given is the total freedom of expression." Constantin Flondor, who was Podlipny's student between 1950 and 1954, remembers being influenced by his "simple, clear and unshakable" pronouncements on artistic matters, such as: "Art requires an abandonment, a self-sacrifice. Taking your place in front of a sheet or a canvass which promises the meeting between a piece of vine charcoal or a brush and the white surface is a moment charged with the thrills of genesis. Nothing and no one has the right to disturb one who is in the sacred moment of labour." Livius Ciocârlie also notes that, although Podlipny "spoke a very corrupted form of Romanian [...], any phrase he had uttered became memorable."

Ciocârlie, who describes Podlipny as "one-armed, nervous, intransigent, sarcastic", recounts the artist's contempt for painting as opposed to drawing and graphics: "to him, colorists were a finical bunch lacking in energy, incapable of tracing a single line." According to Șușară, Podlipny and Baba had a common trait, in that they saw drawing as "fundamental". Podlipny had a rather tense relationship with Cotoșman, who, in 1966, created the nucleus for an underground avant-garde platform, Grupul Sigma. Neumann notes that this might not have been a singular situation, and that Podlipny may have likely been seen as "too demanding" by several other of his pupils.
