= Zamfir Dumitrescu =

Romanian painter (1946–2021)

Zamfir Dumitrescu (15 April 1946 – 6 February 2021) was a Romanian painter.

Zamfir Dumitrescu was born in Bucharest, Romania. He graduated in 1970 from the Nicolae Grigorescu Institute of Art Bucharest, the class of Corneliu Baba.

He served as the Dean of the Faculty of Fine Arts from 2000 to 2004 and became the President of the Union of Fine Arts in Romania in 2002.

== Awards ==
- First Award at the Balkan Artists's International Competition Real Painting (19 November 2004), Sofia.
- Romanian Academy Award George Oprescu (21 December 2004).
