= Bălescu =

Bălescu may refer to:

== Surname ==
- Radu Bălescu
- Cătălin Bălescu
- Constantin Bălescu, Romanian vice-admiral, the namesake of the naval training school of Romanian Naval Forces

== Places ==
- Bălescu River

== See also ==
- Bălcescu
- Băldescu
- Bălescu Mare River
