= Ion Brătianu National College =

Ion Brătianu National College (Romanian: Colegiul Naţional "Ion Brătianu") may refer to one of two educational institutions in Romania:

- Ion Brătianu National College (Haţeg)
- Ion Brătianu National College (Pitești)
