= Dumitru Gorzo =

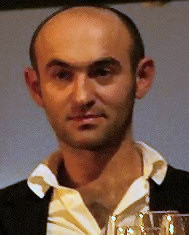
- Gorzo in 2007
- Born: 21 March 1975 (age 50); Ieud, Maramures, Romania
- Education: Bucharest National University of Arts
- Known for: Contemporary Art; Public Art

Dumitru Gorzo (born 1975) is a Romanian contemporary artist. Born in Ieud, Romania, he lives and works in Bucharest and Brooklyn, New York.

== Education ==
Gorzo received an MFA in Visual Arts from the Bucharest National University of Arts in 1999, then studied with painter Florin Mitroi. He was one of the founding members of 'Rostopasca', an influential contemporary artistic movement in Romania. Gorzo's methods of working have ranged from street prankster to performance artist to studio painter and sculptor.

== Works & Controversy ==
Gorzo first began to gain renown for his overtly sexual and political subject matter in 2003, when his guerrilla public installation Cocoons in Bucharest drew attention from a Romanian television station claiming the work had been done by Satanists. Gorzo had glued 350 small plaster, larvae-like figurines to the walls of buildings in the center of the Romanian capital, inciting public debate among passersby about their broader meaning.

His works tend to feature a satiric attitude toward societal issues, which has made him a controversial figure among the more conservative critics and the Romanian public. His works are varied in theme and medium, ranging from hand-hewn wooden reliefs with a Romanian folkloric aesthetic, to sculpture of found objects and paintings with a bold contemporary, conceptual, neo-pop sensibility.

In 2005, Gorzo had his leg broken in an assault following the opening of the provocatively titled show, Mister President is a Sexual Object, at the HT003 gallery in Bucharest, allegedly by unofficial secret-service agents. The show in question depicted the faces of all the Romanian presidents silkscreened onto pillows and impaled on a tree with wooden penises for branches.

In 2006 he showed a major, one-person exhibition at the National Museum of Contemporary Art (Romania) in Bucharest, which then traveled to the Brukenthal National Museum in Sibiu. In 2010 he participated in Badly Happy, a group exhibition at the Marina Abramović Institute.

Gorzo is represented by Slag Gallery in Brooklyn, New York.
