= Alex Gâlmeanu =

Romanian photographer

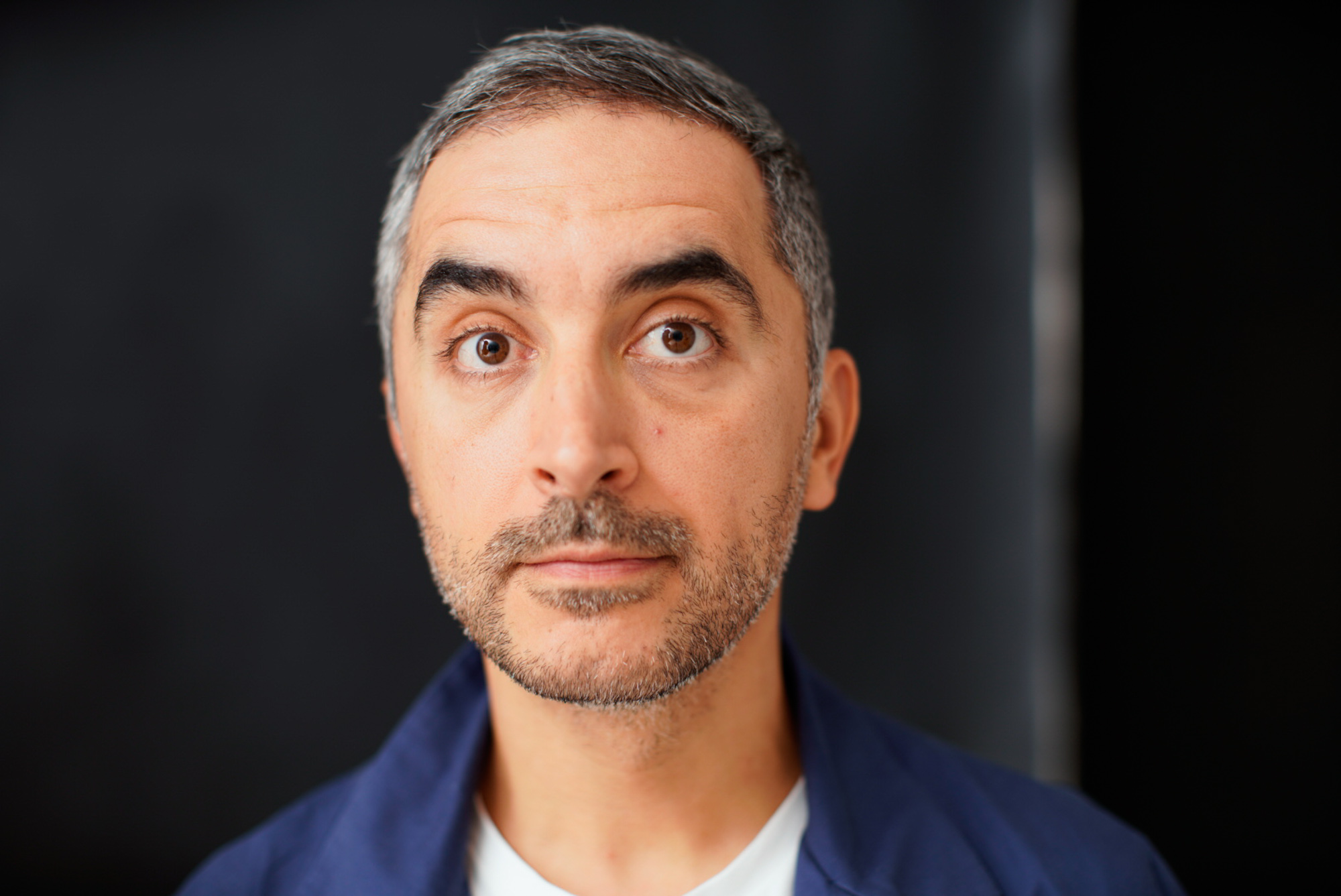
- Born: 29 October 1978 (age 47); Bucharest, Romania
- Education: Photography – National University of Arts, Bucharest
- Occupation: Photographer
- Known for: Editorial, advertising, and experimental photography
- Website: alexgalmeanu.com

Alexandru Pompiliu Gâlmeanu (born 29 October 1978) is a Romanian photographer and image director. He started working in 1998, and has primarily focused on editorial, advertising, fashion or abstract photography.

== Early life and education ==
Gâlmeanu was born on 29 October 1978 in Bucharest, Romania. At the age of 14, he started learning to photograph using the existing photographic equipment in his family's house, including a functional photo laboratory. A year later, in 1993, he published his first photograph, cover no. 3 of Salut magazine. From 1994 till 1997, he attended Colegiul Național Matei Basarab for his higher education, and also worked for the magazine of the "Matei Basarab" National College. In 1997 he had his first collaborations with the Romanian magazine market, working on several occasions for a local independent magazine called 2000 Plus.

In 1997, Gâlmeanu began his studies at the Faculty of Art of Hyperion University, Film Department, but he could not complete it. Subsequently, between 2009 and 2012, he completed his university studies at the University of Art Bucharest, specializing in Photography and Computer Image Processing.

== Career ==
Gâlmeanu began his professional photographic career in 1998. From 1999 to 2002, he worked as an employee of the Ringier Press Trust, becoming the principal photographer for the Ringier Magazine Division. He opened his own photo studio and his own company in 2002.

In 2010, he curated Romania – 50 Years of Female History, an exhibition in which he gathered a selection of 50 images from various archives, female portraits, exhibited and organized by decades, as a celebration of Romanian femininity. The photographic series was exhibited in Constanța, Iași, Cluj and Timișoara. In the following year, he exhibited Subjective Portraits in Reykjavík, Iceland.

Gâlmeanu has shot covers for Forbes NY, Reader's Digest Holland, Esquire, Marie Claire, Elle, Harper's Bazaar, Glamour, InStyle, GQ, Men's Health, FHM, Playboy, and Joy. Galmeanu has directed and produced music videos. He has also directed documentaries including Story seekers, and Artisan which is a 5-episode documentary about artisans in Bucharest.

During 2017–2020, he collaborated with the director Oana Giurgiu, as image director, for making the documentary film Spioni De Ocazie, produced by Libra Flim. The film premiered at the Transylvania International Film Festival (TIFF), organized in Cluj in June 2021.

=== Anastasia ===
In 2003, Gâlmeanu started the Anastasia Project, a photo series in which Anastasia, a Romanian girl, comes to the artist's studio every October to make a portrait. The project is ongoing, through which Gâlmeanu documents the physical and emotional transformations that Anastasia goes through in her journey from child to woman.

=== People I Know Series ===
Gâlmeanu worked on a project named People I Know, and held his first solo exhibition in the National Museum of Contemporary Art in Bucharest in 2005. People I Know is a collection of portraits of Romanian personalities, including Ana Ularu, Oana Pellea, Vlad Ivanov, Johnny Răducanu, Cristian Chivu, Gyuri Pașcu and others. The People I Know series of images was later exhibited in Paris (2008), and in Toulouse (2010), organized by ICR France.

== Selected exhibitions ==
- People I Know – Paris, France – April 2008
- Project 112 – Timișoara, Romania – May 2009
- People I Know – Toulouse, France – May 2010
- Romania – 50 Years of Female History – Constanța, Romania – August 2010
- Subjective Portrets – Reykjavik, Iceland – September 2011
- We like What You Do – Group exhibition – December 2012
- What About Y[our] Memory? – MNAC – Bucharest, Romania, November 2014
- Project 100 – Bucharest, Romania – December 2018
- "Spioni de Ocazie" – TIFF Cluj – June 2021
