= Marilena Murariu =

Romanian painter

- Born: 26 May 1954 (age 71); Iași, Romania
- Education: Bucharest National University of Arts, Bucharest, Romania
- Known for: Painting
- Movement: Lyrical Expressionism, Analytical Cubism

Marilena Murariu (born 1954) is a Romanian painter based in Bucharest.

== Education and career ==
Marilena Murariu was born in Iași, Romania. She is a former student of Vasile Grigore, and graduated from the Bucharest National University of Arts in 1981.

== Work ==
Her work often features provocative and satirical depictions of political figures and events, as well as allusions to historical events and cultural references. Through some of her art, she aims to expose the moral faults of politicians and highlight the manipulative tactics of the media.

== Selected exhibitions ==
- Marilena Murariu's "About Elena in general..." exhibition took place in 2011. The artist constructed her political exhibition discourse around Elena Ceaușescu, a well-known figure from our recent history. Her exhibition featured an eroticized Elena who attracted notorious figures of contemporary Romanian politics to expose the corruption and debauchery of the ruling class. The exhibition was based on some post-communist stories about Elena's "adventurous" youth.
- In the same artistic register to "About Elena in general...", in "Show-off, of, of!" the political spectacle became the focal subject: in 2012, Marilena Murariu exhibited "Show-off, of, of!" at Simeza Gallery in Bucharest.
