= Sorin Ilfoveanu =

Romanian painter

- Born: May 23, 1946 (age 80); Câmpulung Muscel, Romania
- Education: Nicolae Grigorescu Institute of Fine Arts
- Known for: Painting

Sorin Ilfoveanu (born May 23, 1946, in Câmpulung Muscel) is a Romanian painter, designer and university teacher.

== Education ==
- From 1953 to 1964, Ilfoveanu attended Ion Brătianu High School in Pitești, where his colleagues included Daniel Turcea.
- From 1964 to 1970, he studied at the Nicolae Grigorescu Institute of Fine Arts in Bucharest (now the Bucharest National University of Arts), in the class of Corneliu Baba, with Liviu Lăzărescu as assistant. His fellow students included Mihai Cismaru, Ștefan Câlția, Doina Moisescu Herivan and Sorin Dumitrescu. His teachers included Eugen Schileru in art history, Gheorghe Ghițescu in anatomy and Simion Iuca in engraving.
- In 1971, he became a member of the Romanian Union of Fine Artists.

== Academic career ==
- From 1992 to 1996, he was head of the painting department at the Bucharest National University of Arts.
- From 1996 to 2000, he served as dean of the Faculty of Fine Arts at the Bucharest National University of Arts.
- From 2004 to 2006, he was rector of the Bucharest National University of Arts.

== Exhibitions ==
=== Solo exhibitions ===
- 1968 – Art Museum, Pitești
- 1975 – Art Museum, Cluj-Napoca
- 1985 – National Museum of Art, Bucharest
- 1987 – Marais Gallery, Paris
- 1988 – French Institute, Bucharest
- 1993 – Artexpo Gallery, National Theatre, Bucharest
- 1994 – Romanian Cultural Centre, Vienna
- 1999 – Maculata Conceptie/Maculata Conception, with Ştefan Agapian and Adrian Ilfoveanu, Romanian Museum of Literature, Bucharest
- 2001 – National Museum of Art of Romania, Bucharest
- 2001 – M.M.G. Gallery, Tokyo
- 2002 – Codex Ilfoveanu, Apollo Gallery, deINTERESE Gallery and U.A.P., Bucharest
- 2002 – Brukenthal Museum, Sibiu
- 2002 – Art Museum, Cluj-Napoca
- 2011 – Drawings 2008–2011, AnnArt Gallery, Bucharest
- 2011 – Ilfoveanu Painting, Sala Dalles, Bucharest

=== Group exhibitions ===
- 1969 – Astra Gallery, Bucharest
- 1977 – Voos-Bergen, Norway
- 1978 – International Art Biennial, Venice, Italy
- 1982 – Valparaiso Biennial, Chile
- 1984 – I.M.S. Gallery, Oslo
- 1986 – Cagnes-sur-Mer International Festival, France
- 1987 – Orizont Gallery, Bucharest
- 1988 – Art Museum, Seoul, South Korea
- 1988 – Volda Gallery, Norway
- 1989 – Arnhem Gallery, Netherlands
- 1995 – Art Museum, Gothenburg, Sweden
- 1997 – Tegnerfobundet Hall, Oslo
- 1997 – Abu Dhabi Cultural Foundation, United Arab Emirates
- 1997 – Art Museum, Sharjah, United Arab Emirates
- 1998 – Transfiguratii, Mucsarnok, Budapest
- 2000 – Jungersted & Brostrom Gallery, Copenhagen
- 2002 – Littman & White Gallery, Portland, Oregon
- 2009 – Saga Ilfoveanu, with Ana-Ruxandra, Adrian and Nicu Ilfoveanu, ArtSociety Gallery, Bucharest
- 2009 – Mitologie Soggettive, Rocca Paulina, Perugia, Italy
- 2010 – ZOOMANIA.RO, National Museum of Contemporary Art, Bucharest

== Bibliography ==
- Exhibition Catalogue Sorin Ilfoveanu "Drawings 2008 - 2011", AnnArt Gallery, Bucharest;
- "Sorin Ilfoveanu Atelier 1995-2010" Editura UNARTE și Asociația pentru Artă Ilfoveanu, 2011/"Sorin Ilfoveanu 1995-2010 Workshop" Printing House for the Arts Ilfoveanu UNARTE Association, 2011;
- Grife/Bark/Blazer/Ilfoveanu, Ed. Victor B. Victor 2002
- Artists workshops in Bucharest, Sofin Ilfoveanu, metaphysical interrogations of artist Victor Neumann, page 65 Noimediaprint Ed 2008/ Ateliere de artisti din București, Sofin Ilfoveanu, Interogațiile metafizice ale artistului de Victor Neumann, pagina 65 Ed. Noimediaprint 2008
- Sorin Ilfoveanu, Drawings (1994–2007), published by the Association for Art Ilfoveanu, preface of the book-presentation by Cristian Robert Velescu, 2008/ Sorin Ilfoveanu, Desene (1994–2007), Editată de Asociația pentru Artă Ilfoveanu, prefață-prezentare a cărții de Cristian Robert Velescu, 2008
- Exhibition Catalogue Ilfoveanu Saga, ArtSociety Gallery, Bucharest, 2009/Catalogul Expoziției Saga Ilfoveanu, Galeria ArtSociety, București, 2009
- Exhibition Catalogue Umbria: Terra d'incontri - Mitologie Soggettive, Rocca Paulina Perugia, Sorin Ilfoveanu, 2009
- Barbosa, Octavian, Dicționarul artiștilor români contemporani, Editura Meridiane, București, 1976, p. 241-242
- Sorin Ilfoveanu. Colors and metaphors, Meridians House, Bucharest, 1983/Sorin Ilfoveanu. Culori și metafore, Editura Meridiane, București, 1983
- Catalogul Expoziției Ilfoveanu, Pictură și Desen, Muzeul Național de Artă, București, 1985/Ilfoveanu exhibition catalog, Painting and Drawing, National Art Museum, Bucharest, 1985
- Sorin Ilfoveanu, Dicționar de arta modernă și contemporană, Constantin Prut, Ed. Univers enciclopedic 2002
- Sorin Ilfoveanu, Albumul, L'art Roumain, Répères Contemporains, p. 20, auteur Constantin Prut, Ed. Union des Peintres de la Roumanie, 1995
- Sorin Ilfoveanu, Exhibition Catalog of Maculata Conception, Museum of Romanian Literature, Bucharest 1999.
