= Constantin Stăncescu =

Romanian painter, art critic, teacher and translator

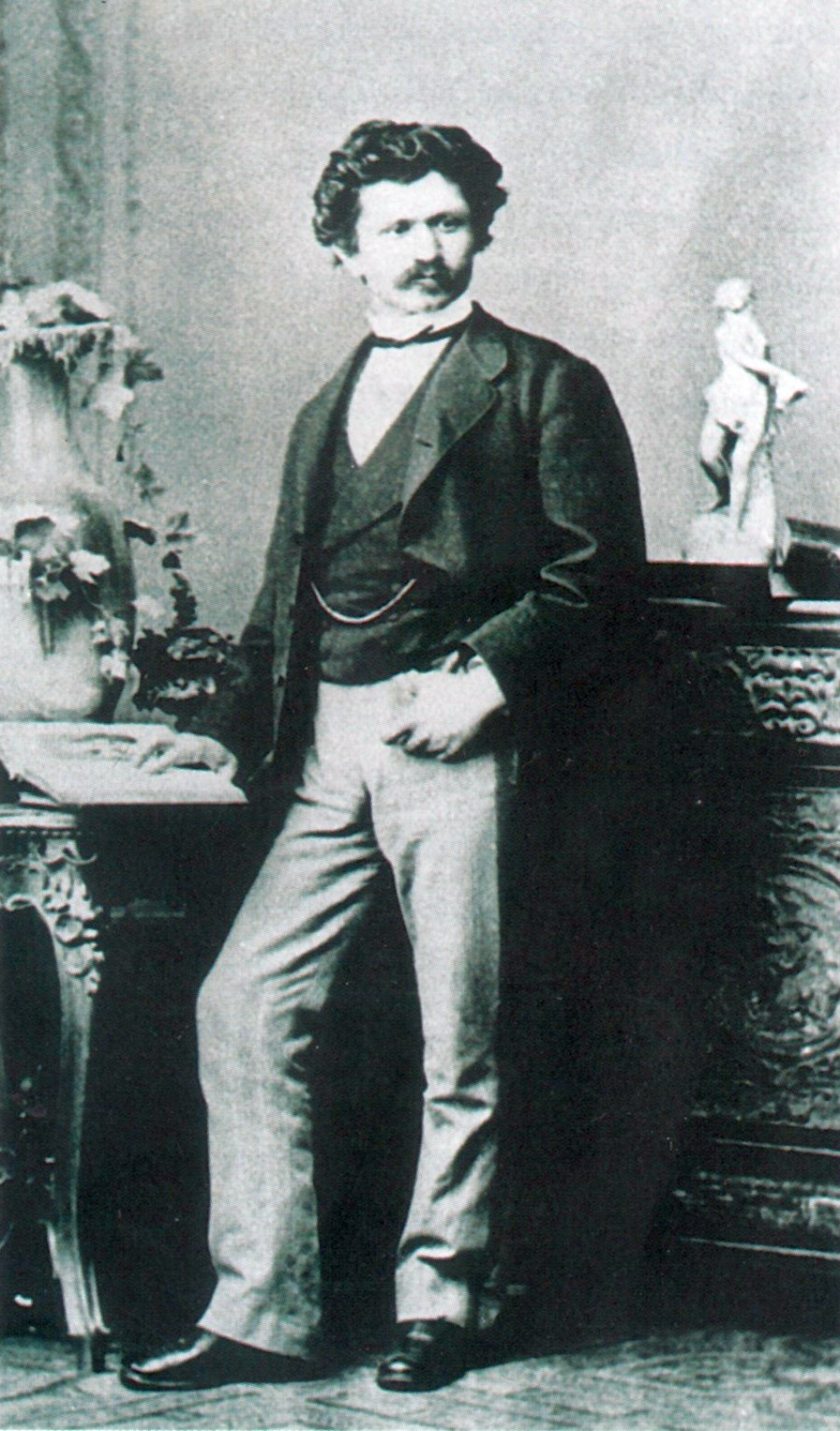
Constantin Stăncescu (date unknown)

Constantin Stăncescu (20 October 1837, Bucharest – 8 June 1909, Bucharest) was a Romanian painter, art critic, teacher and translator.

== Biography ==
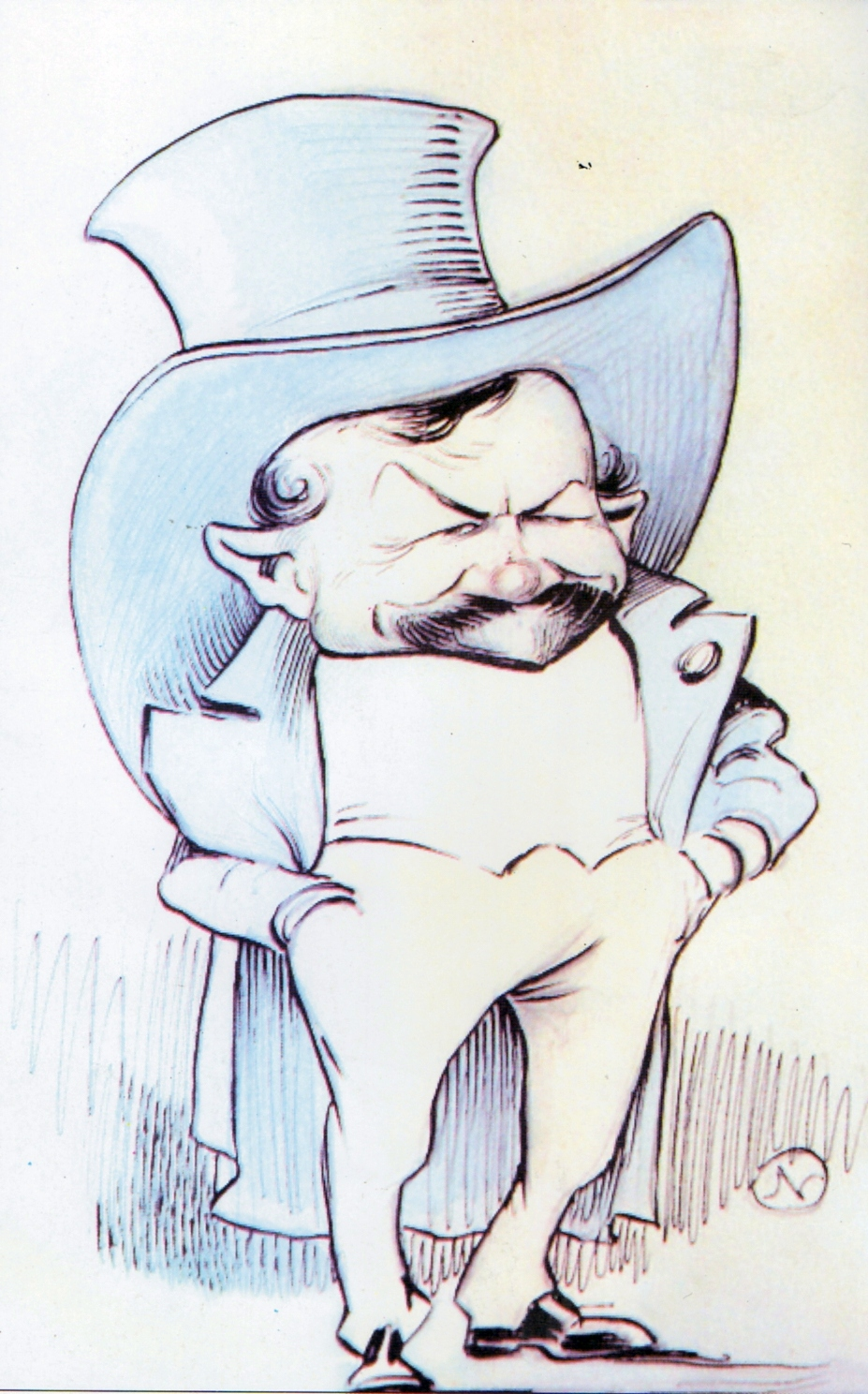
Caricature of Stăncescu, by Petrescu-Găină

He was born into a wealthy family. He initially studied law, but also took drawing and painting lessons from Gheorghe Tattarescu. In 1857, he competed for a travel scholarship; presenting five works, four of which were based on works by Tattarescu. His primary competitor for the money was Nicolae Grigorescu, who would become one of Romania's greatest artists. Stăncescu's victory is generally ascribed to social status, as Grigorescu was from a peasant family.

At the last minute, the travel destination was changed from Italy to France, for unknown reasons. As a result, he was enrolled at the École Nationale Supérieure des Beaux-Arts in Paris, where his primary instructor was Charles Gleyre. His studies, meant to take three years, actually lasted for seven, and his scholarship had to be extended. In 1864, he requested another extension, so he could study in Italy. The request was granted, and he left for Rome. He returned to Romania in the summer of 1865; an "event" that he advertised in the newspapers

Perhaps aware of his relative mediocrity as a painter, he attempted to make a name for himself in other ways, such as writing poetry and several plays; one of which dealt with the Romanian Revolution of 1848. He also gave speeches on art history and aesthetics, and wrote art criticism for numerous journals. His pieces were known for their overblown rhetoric and occasional misuse of terminology. He did. however, continue to participate in the "Exhibition of Living Artists", held periodically at The National School of Fine Arts, and promote himself vigorously.

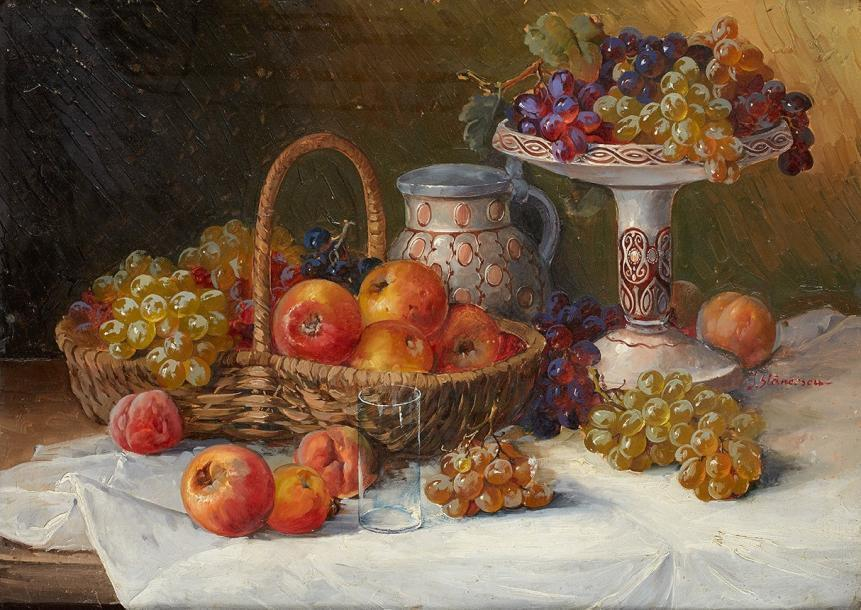
Still-life with Fruit

This eventually resulted in his obtaining a teaching position at the school. In 1892, he was named Director, succeeding his mentor, Tattarescu, who had no doubt recommended him for the position. This automatically made him a member of several commissions responsible for awarding grants and scholarships, as well as giving him seats on the juries of art exhibitions. He is also credited with being one of the founders of the Romanian Athenaeum. His students included many familiar names, such as Constantin Brâncuși, Jean Steriadi, Camil Ressu, Ștefan Luchian, and Nicolae Petrescu-Găină.

Over the years, he painted less and less and, at some point, stopped altogether. He was virtually forgotten when he died. Few of his paintings have made it into museums. Most of his drawings have been lost.
