= Andu Mărginean =

Romanian designer and artist (born 1976)

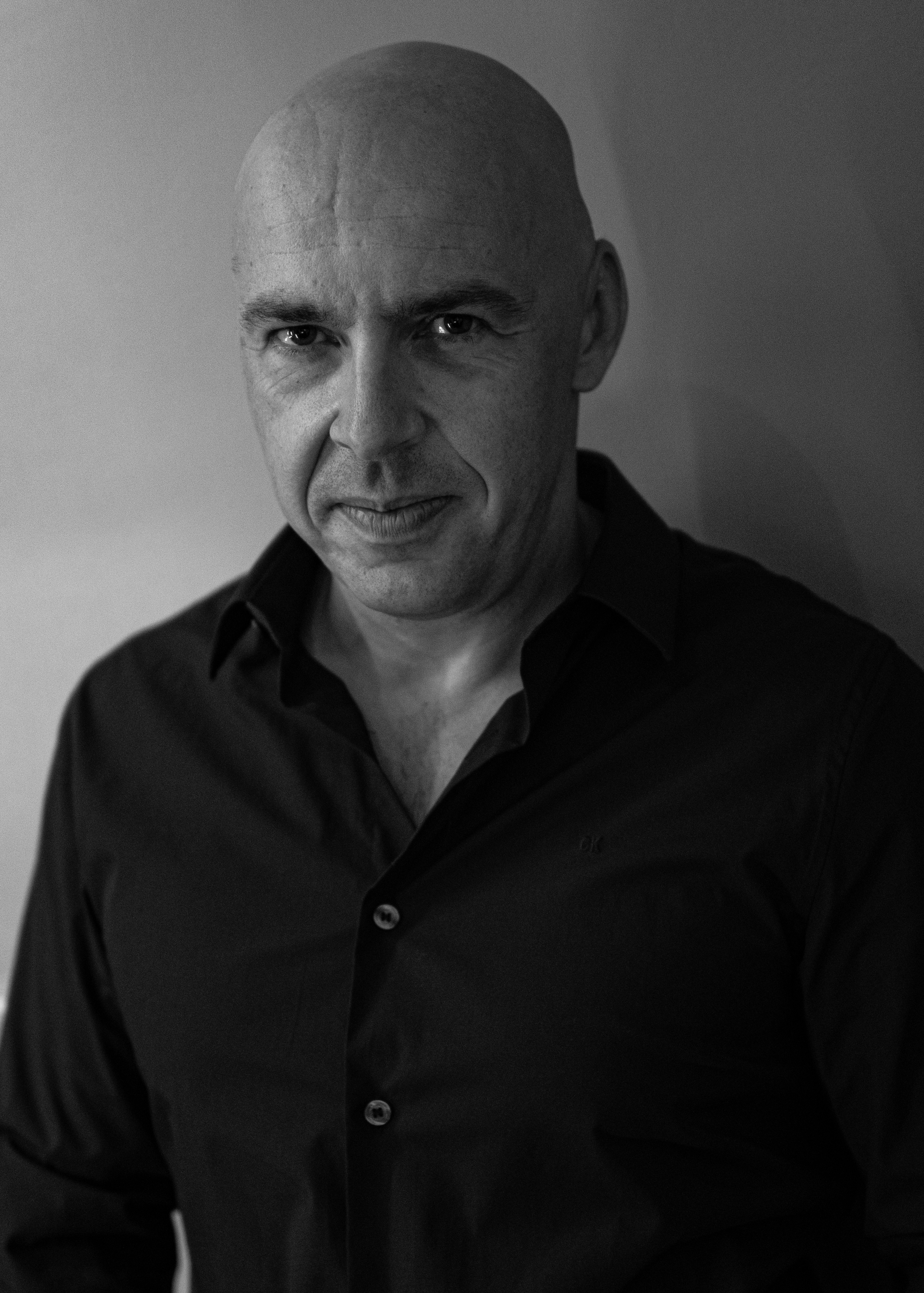
- Mărginean, Sibiu, 2020
- Born: March 23, 1976 (age 50); Sibiu, Sibiu County, Romania
- Education: Bucharest National University of Arts
- Occupations: Designer; artist
- Website: www.arthitek.com

Andu Mărginean is a Romanian designer and artist known for his design work and architectural design projects.

He created Pope Francis's throne during his visit in Romania in 2019. The throne was full of symbols. The wood was chosen from Sighet and Gherla communist prisons, reminding of the agony and suffering in jail, death and sacrifice. The seven bars of the stylized jail window symbolize the seven Greek-Catholic bishops who were martyred under the communist regime, and Pope Francis beatified. Andu was also involved in the redesigning of the Romanian seaside, his contribution summing hotels and residences.

== Early life ==
During his childhood he was curious to express himself so he used to carve soap, to sculpt the chalk in classroom with the tip of the needle or to re-shape the candles wax his grandmother brought from churches. at that time he was not interested in studying design or architecture. Later on, when he grew up as a teenager he decided to follow his inner curiosity into a professional stage so he graduated the painting department of the High School of Arts in Sibiu in June 1994. His interest in reaching next level of acknowledges took him to Bucharest, the same year, where he discovered a new world while applying to fine arts class at the Bucharest National University of Arts in September. Four years later he graduated and after some freelancing practice he founded the first design company in Sibiu in 2000.

== Work ==
After he graduated from the University of Arts, he continued his artist work and since then he continues to paint until he mixed art with architectural design: "I like drawing, painting, visually expressing using plastic art’s resources. I have learned coloring and shaping while practicing on paper or canvas, in front of the easel. I consider to apply the artistic cough I have learned in school in every design project. My goal is to give an artistic value to each object, to get it ready for arousing emotions. There are architectural design projects I decorated with my own paintings.". After developing few architectural projects Forbes called him "the harmony seller" The blending of art and Architectural design is noticed by Modic Magazine: "Andu Mărginean is one of those special professionals that are still keeping the harmony between architectural design and art by practicing both of them at their finest. In 2019 he accepted the challenge to share his experience with students from Dalles Go. His class numbered more than 40 students interested to follow the design path or to upgrade their acknowledges. One of the most important and well known work is for the Pope Francis visit in Romania. He was chosen to design the throne, the cross and the pulpit for the event in Blaj, Romania. To get inspiration for this challenge he traveled to the Vatican, and then carefully choose the wood from the Gherla and Sighet communist prisons.
