= Constantin Bălăceanu-Stolnici =

Romanian neurologist (1923–2023)

- Born: 6 July 1923; Bucharest, Kingdom of Romania
- Died: 20 August 2023 (aged 100); Bucharest, Romania
- Burial place: Bellu Cemetery, Bucharest
- Education: University of Bucharest; Carol Davila University of Medicine and Pharmacy
- Occupation: Neurologist
- Awards: Order of the Star of Romania; Honorary member of the Romanian Academy
- Medical career
- Institutions: Colentina Hospital (1952–1957); Ioan Cantacacuzino Hospital (1957–1965); Gheorghe Marinescu Hospital (1965–1970); Ana Aslan Institute (1974–1993)

Constantin Bălăceanu-Stolnici (6 July 1923 – 20 August 2023) was a Romanian neurologist.

== Biography ==
Constantin Bălăceanu-Stolnici was born in Bucharest, a descendant of an old boyar family. He studied at the Ion C. Brătianu High School in Pitești, graduating in 1941. He then enrolled at the University of Bucharest in the Faculty of Medicine, obtaining the title of Doctor of Medicine with his thesis Considerații asupra complexului cerebro-dentro-olivar, written under the direction of Ion T. Niculescu in 1948. He practiced medicine at several hospitals in Bucharest, including Colentina (1952–1957), Ioan Cantacuzino (1957–1965), and Gheorghe Marinescu (1965–1970). From 1974 to 1993, he worked at the Ana Aslan National Institute of Geriatric and Gerontology.

Beginning in 1974, he collaborated as an informant of the Securitate secret police of the communist regime. Initially reported by the press, this was confirmed by CNSAS and by Bălăceanu-Stolnici himself. Operating under the code names "Paul Ionescu" and "Laurențiu", he was a prolific informer, as well as an agent of influence and agent provocateur for the Securitate. In 2007, Cotidianul published informative notes sent by Bălăceanu-Stolnici to the Securitate, which included a sketch of Vlad Georgescu's Munich apartment, drawn after a visit to his place in October 1984. According to Georgescu's former colleagues, these notes might have helped in the presumed assassination by irradiation of this Radio Free Europe journalist.

Bălăceanu-Stolnici died on 20 August 2023, at the age of 100.

== Honours ==
After the fall of communism, he was elected an honorary member of the Romanian Academy in 1992. In 2003, President Ion Iliescu awarded him the Order of the Star of Romania, Knight rank.

== Publications ==
- Nicolau, Edmond; Bălăceanu-Stolnici, Constantin (1967). Elemente de neurocibernetică (in Romanian). Editura Științifică.
- Bălăceanu-Stolnici, Constantin; Balaci, M.; Berescu, Magdalena; Bogdan, Constantin (1998). Geriatrie practică (in Romanian). Amaltea.
- Lerner, Dan A.; Weinberg, Josette; Cimpoeșu, Fănică; Bălăceanu-Stolnici, Constantin (2006). "Theoretical study of DHEA: comparative HF and DFT calculations of the electronic properties of a complex between DHEA and serotonin". Journal of Molecular Modeling. 12 (2): 146–151. doi:10.1007/s00894-005-0007-9. PMID 16283116. S2CID 43786321.
- Kozma, Andrei; Glavce, Cristiana; Bălăceanu-Stolnici, Constantin, eds. (2014). Antropologie și mediu (in Romanian). Bucharest: Editura Niculescu.
