= Cătălin Bălescu =

Romanian artist

Cătălin Bălescu (born January 6, 1962) is a Romanian visual artist and a university professor at the Department of Painting of The National University of Arts in Bucharest.

Bălescu is the rector of The National University of Arts in Bucharest (elected in 2012). He is a member of the permanent staff of the Doctoral Studies section within The National University of Arts in Bucharest, and has coordinated doctoral dissertations ever since 2010.

Cătălin Bălescu has been a member of The Visual Artists’ Union of Romania (U.A.P) since 1990.

== Education ==
Cătălin Bălescu was born at Brad, Hunedoara County, Romania. In 1986 he graduated from the “Nicolae Grigorescu” Plastic Arts Institute, where he had studied between 1981 and 1986. Prior to that, he had studied at the High School of Arts in Deva, Hunedoara, Romania.

== Scientific and didactic activity ==
Cătălin Bălescu has been teaching at the Department of Painting of The National University of Arts in Bucharest since 1990. He started his academic career as an assistant professor, between 1990 and 1997, at the class of Professors Sorin Ilfoveanu, Florin Mitroi, Vasile Grigore. In 1998 he became a university lecturer at the Department of Painting of The National University of Arts in Bucharest. In 2003 Cătălin Bălescu became a doctor in visual arts (artis doctor), by successfully defending his thesis entitled Grammar Elements of Visual Art Imagery: ImageSyntax, published by Printech Publishing House, 2004, ISBN 9737180909.

Between 2005 and 2009 he was an associate professor at the Department of Painting of The National University of Arts in Bucharest. In 2009 he earned his title of university professor.

During 1995–1996 Cătălin Bălescu coordinated the Studio 35 (Atelier 35) section of The Visual Artists’ Union of Romania( U.A.P).

Ever since 1996 Cătălin Bălescu has been involved in organizing activities with students groups of the Department of Painting. From 1990 to 2000 he worked as a Scientific Secretary of the Department of Painting of The National University of Arts. Between 2000 and 2004 he was appointed Scientific Secretary of the Faculty of Fine Arts of The National University of Arts in Bucharest. In 2004 Cătălin Bălescu was appointed Scientific Secretary of the Senate of The National University of Arts in Bucharest, Romania.

As far as scientific activity is concerned, starting with 2004 Cătălin Bălescu has been the ARTLAB Director (i.e. of the Laboratory for Artistic Image Analysis and Creation), acknowledged by CA 37/2004 of The National Council of Scientific Research (the NCSR, i.e. the CNCS).

Among the research projects in which he has taken active part there is the Type A NCSR – 1/2000, Research Concerning Advanced Techniques of Artistic Imagery Analysis, carried out in partnership with the Department of Mathematics of the Faculty of Cybernetics of [Bucharest University of Economic Studies] (AES) (see The AES Informatics Review 17/2001).

From 2002 to 2004 Cătălin Bălescu participated in the PED Project/ CERES Program/National Plan for Development, entitled An Analysis Method of Fundamental Elements of ArtisticImagery, carried out in partnership with The National Institute for Research and Development in Optoelectronics NIOE 2000. Between 2006 and 2008 Cătălin Bălescu was involved in a program of providing graduation equipment for laboratories, administered by The National Ministry of Education. In 2008 he got involved in the CEX 05D8-02-2 project entitled eMart-Cyber Museumof Arts Universities in Romania.

Cătălin Bălescu is a member of the JAQM Advisory Board (Journal of Applied Quantitative Methods).

== Personal exhibitions ==
- 2006 – at The Apollo Gallery in Bucharest, Romania
- 2003 – at TheSimeza Gallery in Bucharest
- 2000 – at TheSimeza Gallery in Bucharest
- 1997 – at The Apollo Gallery in Bucharest
- 1994 – at The Simeza Gallery in Bucharest

== Group exhibitions (a selection) ==
- 2013 – The Painting Salon, at The Visual Arts Center in Bucharest, Romania
- 2013, May – Ten + (Zece +) at The Visual Arts Center in Bucharest
- 2013, April – VENATURE XXV, at The Visual Arts Center in Bucharest
- 2012 – UNARTE 012: The Department of Painting Exhibition, at The Museum of Arts in Cluj- Napoca, Cluj County, Romania
- 2012 – Arts in Bucharest, at The Visual Arts Center in Bucharest
- 2012 – Culture of Cosmos, at The Parliament Hall in Bucharest
- 2012, January – Eleven + (Unsprezece +) at The Visual Arts Center in Bucharest
- 2011 – Group Exhibition at The Plastic Artists Union Gallery in Iaşi, Iaşi County, Romania
- 2011 – Thirteen (Treisprezece) at The Visual Arts Center in Bucharest
- 2011 – …After Cremaster, at The Visual Arts Center in Bucharest
- 2010 – Studio Instances II, at The Visual Arts Center in Bucharest
- 2009 – TEN (ZECE), at The Visual Arts Center in Bucharest
- 2009 – Studio Instances I, at The Visual Arts Center in Bucharest
- 2008 – The Andalusian Dog, at The Artis Gallery in Bucharest
- 2008 – Drawing Group Exhibition at The Simeza Gallery in Bucharest
- 2003 – The Municipal Salon at The Artis Gallery in Bucharest
- 2001 – Group Exhibition at The Căminul Artei Gallery, at the 1st Floor in Bucharest
- 2001 – The National Arts Salon at The Exhibition Pavilion in Bucharest
- 1999 – Time in Space Arts, at The Institute of Architecture in Bucharest
- 1995 – Group Exhibition at The Apollo Gallery in Bucharest
- 1995, March – Object vs. Objectivity, at the Studio 35 (Atelier 35) in Bucharest
- 1995, February – New Avant-Garde vs. New Traditionalism, at the Studio 35 in Bucharest
- 1995, January – Power vs. Powerlessness, at the Studio 35 in Bucharest
- 1994, 1992, 1990, 1988, 1987 – Youth Exhibition, at The National Theater in Bucharest (TNB)
- 1988 – The Annual Graphics Exhibition, at The Dalles Hall in Bucharest
- 1996, 1995, 1994, 1993, 1992, 1985 – The Municipal Exhibition at The National Theater in Bucharest (TNB)
- 1983 – Sketches, Students’ Exhibition, in Bucharest

== International exhibitions ==
- 2012 – The International Triennial of Drawing and Engraving –3rdEdition, Bangkok, Thailand
- 2001 – The International Biennial of Drawing and Engraving, Taipei, Taiwan
- 2000 – Yungersted&Brostrom Gallery, Copenhagen, Denmark
- 1997 – The International Arts Biennial, Sharjah, Arabian Emirates Union
- 1995 – Rhein Main Maritime Hotel, Darmstadt, Germany
- 1995 – The Romanian Cultural Centers in Vienna (Austria), Budapest (Hungary), Venice (Italy)
- 1995 – The International Painting Festival, CagnessurMer, France
- 1990 – An Itinerant Exhibition; ISELP, Bruxelles; Botanique Gallery, Bruxelles, Belgium; The Romanian Library in Paris, France
- 1989 – The International Miniature Festival, 4th Edition, Galleria Del Bello, Toronto, Canada

== Prizes, awards, scholarships, grants ==
- 1997 – Scholarship from The Italian Cultural Institute in Bucharest; traveling to study in Rome, Florence, Venice – Italy
- 1993 – Tempus Scholarship for Bath College of Higher Education, UK
- 1988 – Costin Petrescu Scholarship from the Plastic Artists Union, Romania

== Articles, books, book illustration ==
- Zhang S., Neagu D. and Bălescu C., ”Refinement of Clustering Solutions Using a Multi-Label

Voting Algorithm for Neuro-Fuzzy Ensembles,” Procs. of The First International Conference on Natural Computation ICNC 2005 (Lipo Wang, Ke Chen, Yew S. Ong, eds.) Changsha, China, 2005, Springer Verlag Lecture Notes in Computer Science LNCS3612, pp. 1300 –1303, ISBN 3-540-28320-X

- Zhang S. and Bălescu C., “A Multi-Label Voting Algorithm for Neuro-Fuzzy Classifiers Ensembles Applied for Visual Arts Data Mining,” Procs. of The 5th International Conference on Intelligent Systems Design and Applications ISDA 2005, (HalinaKwasnicka, Marcin Paprycki, eds.), Wroclaw, Poland, 2005, IEEE Computer Society Press, pp. 245–250, ISBN 0-7695-2286-6
- Zhang S., Neagu D., Bălescu C., “Knowledge Representation for Visual Art Data Mining,” The 6th Informatics Workshop for Research Students, Univ. of Bradford, 23 March 2005, pp. 198–202, ISBN 1-85143-220-5
- Zhang S., Neagu D., Bălescu C., “Visual Art Data Mining: Knowledge Representation and a Case Study,” PREP 2005: The EPSRC Postgraduate Research Conference in Electronics, Photonics, Communications and Networks, and Computing Science at the University of Lancaster, March 30– April 1, 2005, pp. 295–296
- Bălescu, Cătălin, Graphic Design to the volume of Sorin Ilfoveanu, Studio Notes 1985 – 2009, Vols. I – VI, 2009
- Bălescu, Cătălin, Graphic Design to the volume of Sorin Ilfoveanu, Studio 1995 – 2010, UNARTE Publishing House, 2010, ISBN 978-606-8296-00-5
- Bălescu, Cătălin, Graphic Design to the volume The Kalinderu Heritage: Ruins of a Museum, UNARTE Publishing House, ISBN 978-973-1922-52-2
- Bălescu, Cătălin, General Editor & Project Coordinator, The National University of Arts Museum, UNARTE Publishing House, 2008, ISBN 978-973-1922-06-5

== Bibliography ==
- Cătălin Bălescu, President of UNARTE, invited to A Word about Culture, Radio România Cultural – https://web.archive.org/web/20150725232549/http://www.radioromaniacultural.ro/rectorul_unarte_catalin_balescu_invitat_la_vorba_de_cultura-9941
- CĂTĂLIN BĂLESCU, “Painting, The Simeza Gallery” – 1994 – 2000 – 2004 – UNARTE Publishing House, ISBN 978-973-87493-9-9, 2007
- CĂTĂLIN BĂLESCU, “Painting, The Apollo Gallery” – 2006 – UNARTE Publishing House, ISBN 978-97388507-4-3, 2007
- Catalog of the National University of Arts in Bucharest, UNARTE Publishing House, ISBN 973-87493-0-1, 2006 (member of the coordinating team of editors)
- Catalog of the National Salon of Arts 2006, edited by the Plastic Artists Union of Romania, financial support by AFCN, ISBN 973-86483-8-6
- The UNARTE 011 Catalog, The Visual Arts Center, UNARTE Publishing House, Bucharest, 2011, ISBN 978-606-8296-12-8
- The Catalog of The Thirteen Exhibition, The Visual Arts Center, UNARTE Publishing House, Bucharest 2011, ISBN 978-606-8296-08-1
- The UNARTE 012 Catalog, The Visual Arts Center, UNARTE Publishing House, Bucharest 2011, ISBN 978-606-8296-46-3
- The Arts in Bucharest Catalog, the 2nd Edition, The Visual Arts Center, UNARTE Publishing House, Bucharest 2011, ISBN 978-606-8296-45-6
- The Arts in Bucharest Catalog, the 3rd Edition, The Visual Arts Center, UNARTE Publishing House, Bucharest 2012, ISBN 978-606-8296-68-5
- The 11+ Exhibition Catalog, The Visual Arts Center, UNARTE Publishing House, Bucharest 2012, ISBN 978-606-8296-39-5
- The 10+ Exhibition Catalog, The Visual Arts Center, UNARTE Publishing House, Bucharest, 2013, ISBN 978-606-8296-86-9
- The CagnessurMer International Painting Festival Catalog, the 27th Edition, Ed. by The Ministry of Culture in France and UNESCO, 1995
- The 10th International Biennial Print and Drawing Exhibition Catalog, Ed. by Taipei Fine Arts Museum Council for Cultural Affairs Taiwan, Taipei, 2001
- The 3rdTrienniale International Print and Drawing Exhibition Catalog, Ed by Art and Culture Office Bangkok – Thailand, 2012
- https://web.archive.org/web/20140116094117/http://www.romanialibera.ro/cultura/arte-vizuale/un-secol-si-jumatate-de-invatamant-de-arta-322807.html
- The BIEFF 2013 International Festival Catalog, the online version – http://www.bieff.ro/upload/CatalogBIEFF2013.pdf
- Artist’s Works presented in auction – http://www.artnet.com/artists/catalin-balescu/past-auction-results
- Cătălin Bălescu’s Exhibition at the National Theater, by AncaVlada, The National Courier –
- Venature XXV, Mihai Plămădeală, Observatorul Cultural– http://www.observatorcultural.ro/ARTE-VIZUALE-Venature-XXV*articleID_28601-articles_details.html
- The New Rectors of Bucharest Universities, Adevarul – http://adevarul.ro/news/bucuresti/cine-noii-rectori-universitatilor-bucurestene-1_50bdeca87c42d5a663d022f0/index.html
- The National University of Arts in Bucharest at Its 150th Anniversary, Observatorul Cultural – http://www.observatorcultural.ro/*id_4916-news_details.html
- Quality Parameters in the Aesthetic Analysis of Artistic Image, The ESA Economic Informatic Review 17/2001 – https://web.archive.org/web/20140225055650/http://revistaie.ase.ro/content/17/cocianu.pdf
