= Gheorghe Șaru =

Romanian-American painter

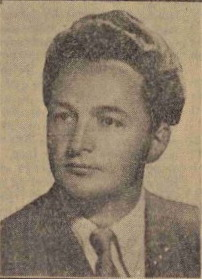

Gheorghe Șaru (also George Saru; 1920 – 2003) was a Romanian-American painter, born in Romania at Checea, Timis County.

Best known as an abstract modernist painter, Saru was very active in Romania, working as both an artist and professor of art at The Fine Art Academy of Bucharest. He is known for his ability to create transparency and a glowing quality through his fine brushwork. His abstract work has a very distinct style and often hides figurative motifs all throughout. George Saru has illustrated many books, children's books, has designed mosaic public art works and has collaborated on tapestry work with his wife, Liana Saru.

He moved to America in the late 1980s and although legally blind, he painted until his last days taking on a much different and less detailed, striking brushwork style and painted in much brighter colors. He rests at Calvary Cemetery, New York City.
