= Ion Brătianu National College (Pitești) =

- Colegiul Național Ion C. Brătianu

Location
- Armand Călinescu Street, Nr. 14; Pitești, Argeș County; Romania
- Coordinates: 44.8575°N 24.8682°E

Information
- Type: High School
- Established: 1866
- Headmaster: Alina Manea
- Website: colegiulbratianu.ro

The "Ion C. Brătianu" National College (Romanian: Colegiul Național Ion C. Brătianu) is a comprehensive four-year public high school with 1,200 students enrolled in grades 9 through 12, located at 14 Armand Călinescu Street, Pitești, Romania. It is named after the Romanian politician Ion C. Brătianu.

== History ==
The school opened in the fall of 1866 as the first teaching institution in the city of Pitești and evolved throughout the years, from the original primary school to a secondary 8 grades school, then to a 12 grades one, and finally became a high-school (9–12 grades) in 1965. Today, "Brătianu" is recognized as one of the best high-schools in Romania. Because of its remarkable selectivity, the high admission percentage of its graduates, the very high overall GPA of its students and their excellent results in National Olympiads and other contests, in 1997 the "Ion C. Brătianu" High School was awarded the title of "National College" (Colegiu Național).

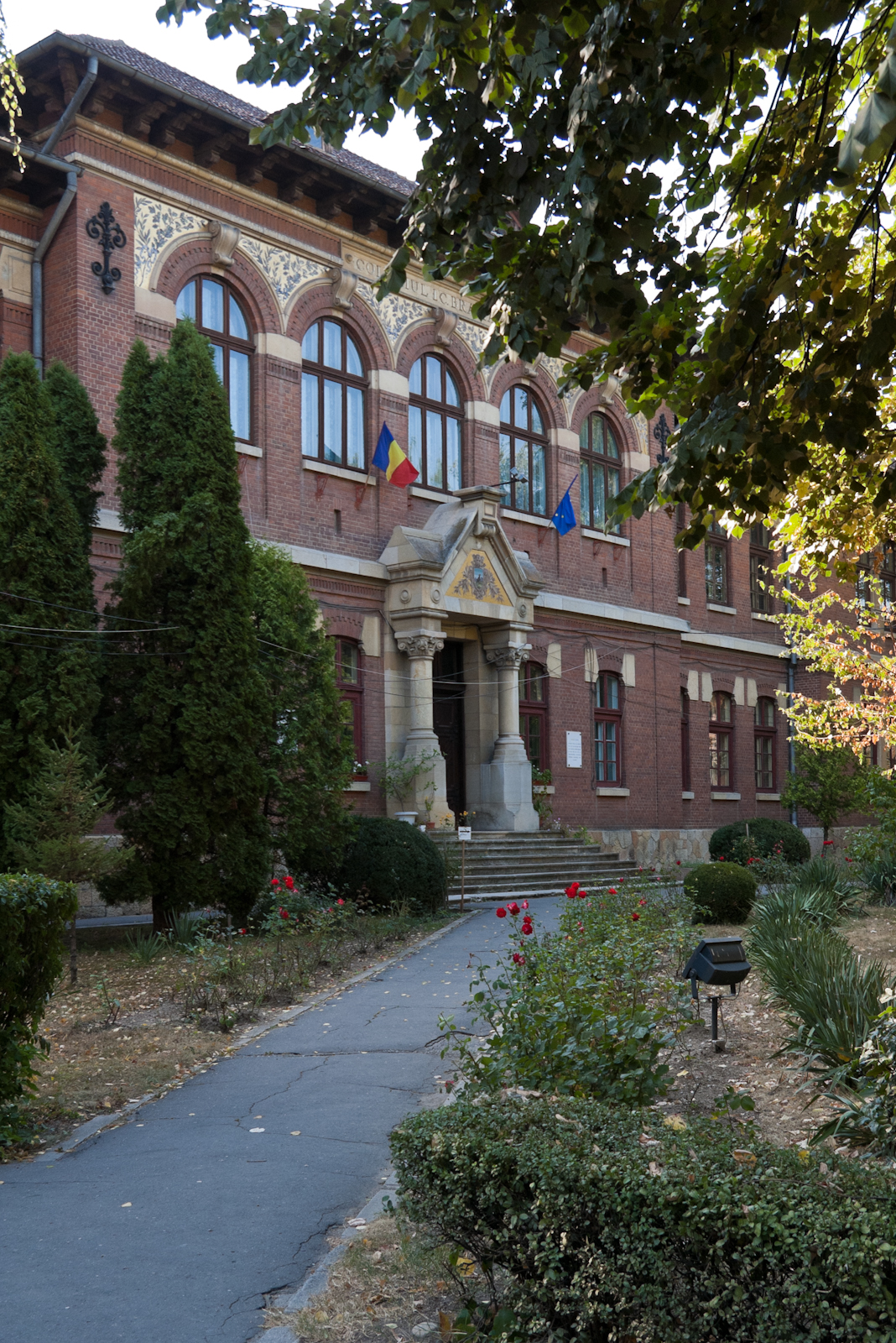
Main entrance to the Ion Brătianu National College.

== Curriculum ==
The academic program is organized on a 2 shift schedule – the morning shift and the evening shift. In accordance to the Romanian curriculum imposed by the Ministry, the students have a fixed weekly schedule that is repeated throughout the two semesters of the academic year. They are organized in groups of approximately 30 students and each of these groups has a certain classroom assigned to it. Students attend six – 50 minutes classes daily.

AP courses or Honors classes are mainly unknown to the Romanian system but their alternative is found in all highschools: special class profiles. Therefore, although the core curricula is imposed by the legislation of the Ministry, the highschool offers partially different kinds of classes depending on the profile chosen by each of the 30 students groups. The offered profiles refer to the class/classes that group should focus upon as it follows:

- Mathematics-Informatics (4 Informatics, 4 Mathematics and 3 Physics classes/week)
- Mathematics-Informatics, Intensive Studies (6-7 Informatics, 4 Mathematics and 3-4 Physics classes/week)
- Mathematics-Informatics – Bilingual (English/French/German)(7 English and 2 U.K. History & Geography classes/week, or the same for French or German)
- Natural Sciences (3 Physics, 3 Biology and 3 Chemistry classes/week)
- Social Sciences (4 Philosophy, 5 Romanian and 6 Foreign language classes/week)
- Philology (2 Philosophy, 4 Romanian, 3 Latin and 4 Foreign language classes/week)
- Philology – Bilingual (English)(2 Philosophy, 4 Romanian, 3 Latin and 6 English classes/week)

== Grading and ranking ==
The grading system used is the Romanian numerical grading system, with grades ranging from 1 to 10, 10 being the maximum; 5 is the graduating mark. At the end of each semester and at the end of the year, the final grade is obtained through the arithmetic mean of the grades received throughout the year. Where term papers apply (Romanian, Mathematics, Physics, Informatics), this arithmetic mean is multiplied by 3 added with the term paper's result and divided by 4 to obtain the final grade.

An American style ranking system is not offered but each group of students calculates its own rank and awards diplomas for the highest 3 final grades, and at the end of the 12th grade the school awards the distinction of Chief of graduates to the student with the highest final grade over the four years.

The examination all Romanian students take when they graduate the high school studies is the Baccalaureate exam which consists of the following subjects: Romanian – speaking and writing, a foreign language – speaking, Mathematics, a science (the special profile assigned science – if on a special profile class) and a social science. The graduating mark for the Baccalaureate is 6.

The statistical data for the 2009 class are:

- The final grade of the Chief of graduates : 10
- The average final grade : 9.29
- The percentage of Baccalaureate graduates : 99.71%
- The highest Baccalaureate grade : 9.95
- The average Baccalaureate grade : 9.42

== Notable alumni ==
Mathematician Ciprian Manolescu, the only three-time winner of the International Mathematics Olympiad, attended Brătianu High School, as have other 7 international olympiad gold medallists in mathematics, biology, and physics. Other notable alumni in the sciences were neurologists Gheorghe Marinescu and Constantin Bălăceanu-Stolnici.

Former Romanian President Emil Constantinescu, as well as Prime Minister Armand Călinescu, Foreign Minister Istrate Micescu, and Marshal Ion Antonescu also attended the high school.

In arts the high school had many talented students, such as the poets Ion Barbu and Ion Minulescu, the painters Sorin Ilfoveanu, Costin Petrescu, and Rudolf Schweitzer-Cumpăna, the writers Dan Simonescu, Vladimir Streinu, Tudor Teodorescu-Braniște, and George Vâlsan, and the journalist Robert Turcescu.
