= Bucharest National University of Arts =

Fine arts school in Bucharest, Romania

Coordinates: 44.442895°N 26.091403°E

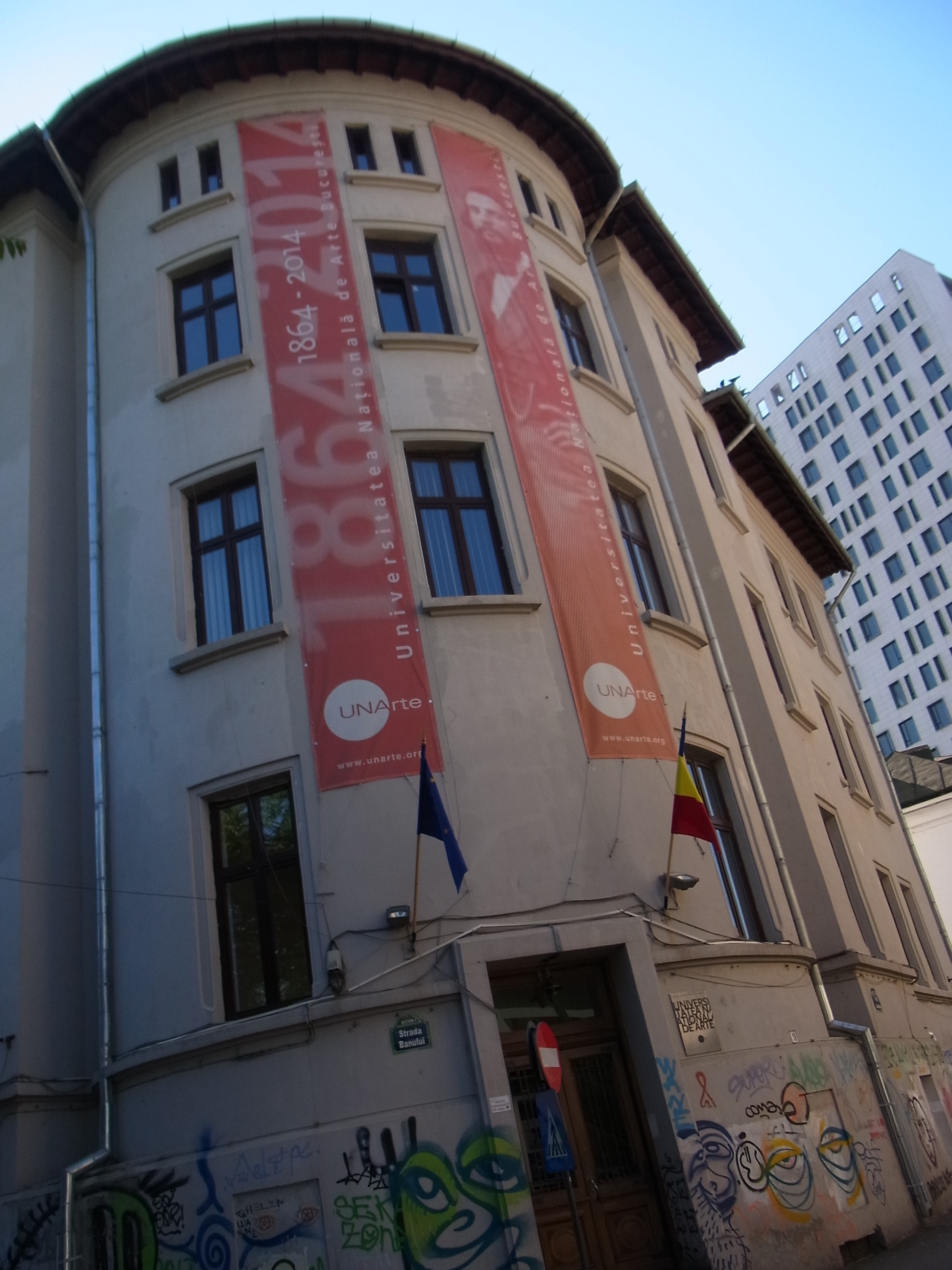
Main building

The National University of Arts in Bucharest (Romanian: Universitatea Națională de Arte) is a university in Bucharest preparing students in fine arts. The National University of Arts is a higher education institution in Bucharest.

== History ==
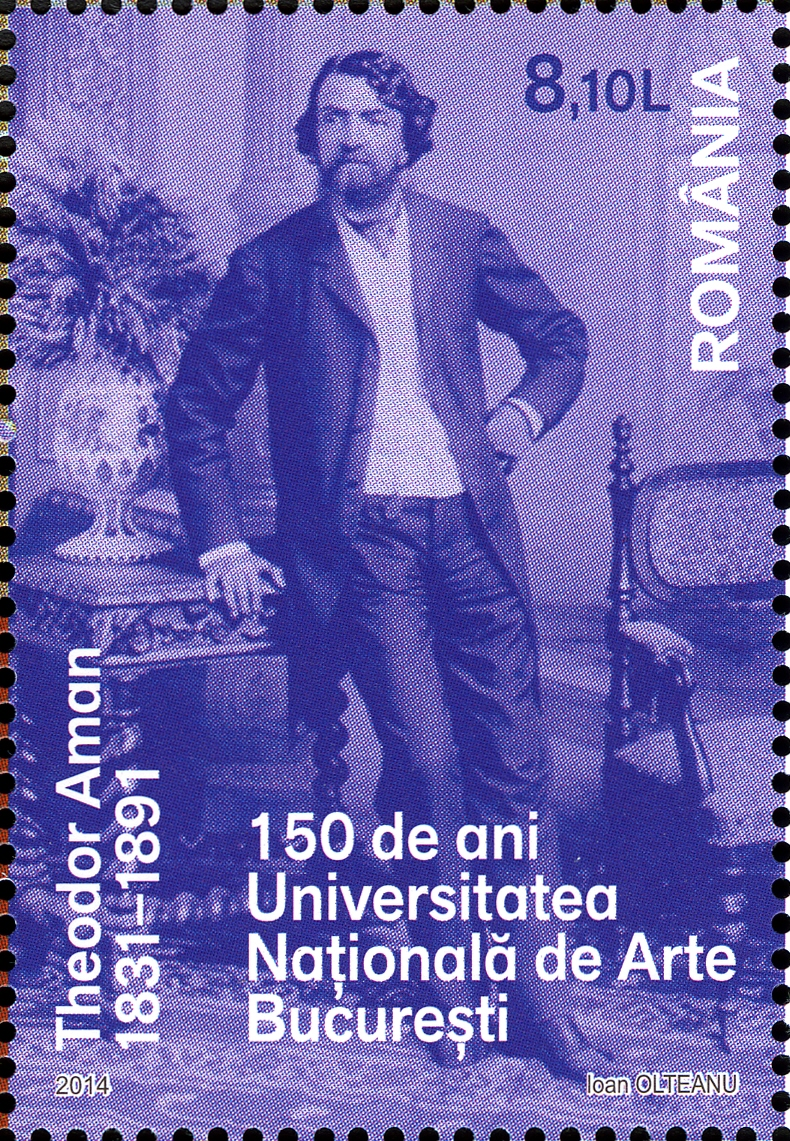
Romanian stamp from 2014, commemorating the 150th anniversary of the founding of the Bucharest National University of Arts

The National School of Fine Arts was founded on 5 October 1864 through a decree issued by the ruler Alexandru Ioan Cuza and as a result of the efforts pursued by the painters Theodor Aman and Gheorghe Tattarescu. This fine arts institution from Bucharest has had a number of official denominations over time:

- 1864 – The National School of Fine Arts (Școala Națională de Arte Frumoase)
- 1931 – The Fine Arts Academy (Academia de Belle-Arte)
- 1942 – The Higher School of Arts in Bucharest (Școala Superioară de Arte din București)
- 1948 – The Fine Arts Institute "Nicolae Grigorescu" (Institutul de Arte Plastice "Nicolae Grigorescu")
- 1990 – The Academy of Arts (Academia de Arte)
- 1995 – The University of Arts (Universitatea de Arte)
- 2002 – The National University of Arts in Bucharest (Universitatea Națională de Arte București)

The School had various departments: painting, sculpture, engraving, architecture, line drawing, aesthetics, history and perspectival drawing. At that time, the duration of studies was 5 years.

The School of Decorative Arts was founded in 1904.

In 1909, Spiru Haret approved the Regulation for the interior administration of the School of Arts, a document that established the admission examination and confirmed the break with the School of Architecture through the approval of a method of selection by the end of the 1st year of studies. The duration of studies was 7 years.

Through the Higher Education Law of 1931, the Fine Arts Schools in Romania were transformed in Fine Arts Academies. The first appointed rector was Camil Ressu. In 1942 the Academy changed its name again into the Higher School of Arts in Bucharest. The Arts Institute of Bucharest was founded in 1948 and included the Faculties of Theatre and Music, Choreography and Fine Arts, Decorative Arts and Art History. The Fine Arts Institute "Nicolae Grigorescu" was established in 1950. Since 1990 The Fine Arts Institute "Nicolae Grigorescu" changed its name into the Academy of Arts and, from 2002, its current name is The National University of Arts.

== Faculties ==
The University is structurally divided into 3 faculties:

- The Faculty of Fine Arts which includes the Departments of: Painting, Graphic Arts, Sculpture, Dynamic Image and Photography, Visual Art Education, Theory and Research.
- The Faculty of Decorative Arts and Design which includes the Departments of: Design, Fashion Design, Textile Design and Textile Arts, 9 Mural Art, Ceramics-Glass-Metal, and Set Design.
- The Faculty of Art History and Theory comprises 2 Departments: Art History and Theory and Conservation and Restoration.

Since 2012, the elected rector of the National University of Arts in Bucharest is Professor Cătălin Bălescu.

== Notable professors and alumni ==
- Béla Nagy Abodi
- Ioan Andreescu
- Theodor Aman
- Corneliu Baba
- Cătălin Bălescu
- Dragoș Gheorghiu
- Ignat Bednarik
- Catul Bogdan
- Constantin Brâncuși
- Traian Brădean
- Victor Brauner
- Ștefan Câlția
- Florin Ciubotaru
- Alexandru Ciucurencu
- Claudia Cobizev
- Nicolae Comănescu
- Nicolae Dărăscu
- Vasile Drăguț
- Sorin Dumitrescu
- Ion Dumitriu
- Darie Dup
- Ion Frunzetti
- Alex Gâlmeanu
- Albert György
- Dimitrie Gerota
- Gheorghe Ghițescu
- Dumitru Gorzo
- Elena Greculesi
- Ion Grigorescu
- Adrian Guță
- Radu Igaszag
- Sorin Ilfoveanu
- Marin Iorda
- Ionel Jianu
- Iosif Kiraly
- Petru Lucaci
- Ștefan Luchian
- Andu Mărginean
- Hortensia Masichievici Mișu
- Cornel Medrea
- Florin Mitroi
- Elena Murariu
- Marilena Murariu
- Adina Nanu
- Paul Neagu
- Ion Nicodim
- George Oprescu
- Dimitrie Paciurea
- Dumitru Pasima
- Horea Paștina
- Vasile Pintea
- Andrei Pleșu
- Lasgush Poradeci
- Victòria Pujolar
- Silvia Radu
- Stefan Ramniceanu
- Camil Ressu
- Mihai Sârbulescu
- Eugen Schileru
- Francisc Șirato
- Constantin Stăncescu
- Jean Alexandru Steriadi
- D. I. Suchianu
- Gheorghe Tattarescu
- Traian Trestioreanu
- Aurel I. Vlad
- Marian Zidaru
