= Ștefan Câlția =

Romanian painter (born 1942)

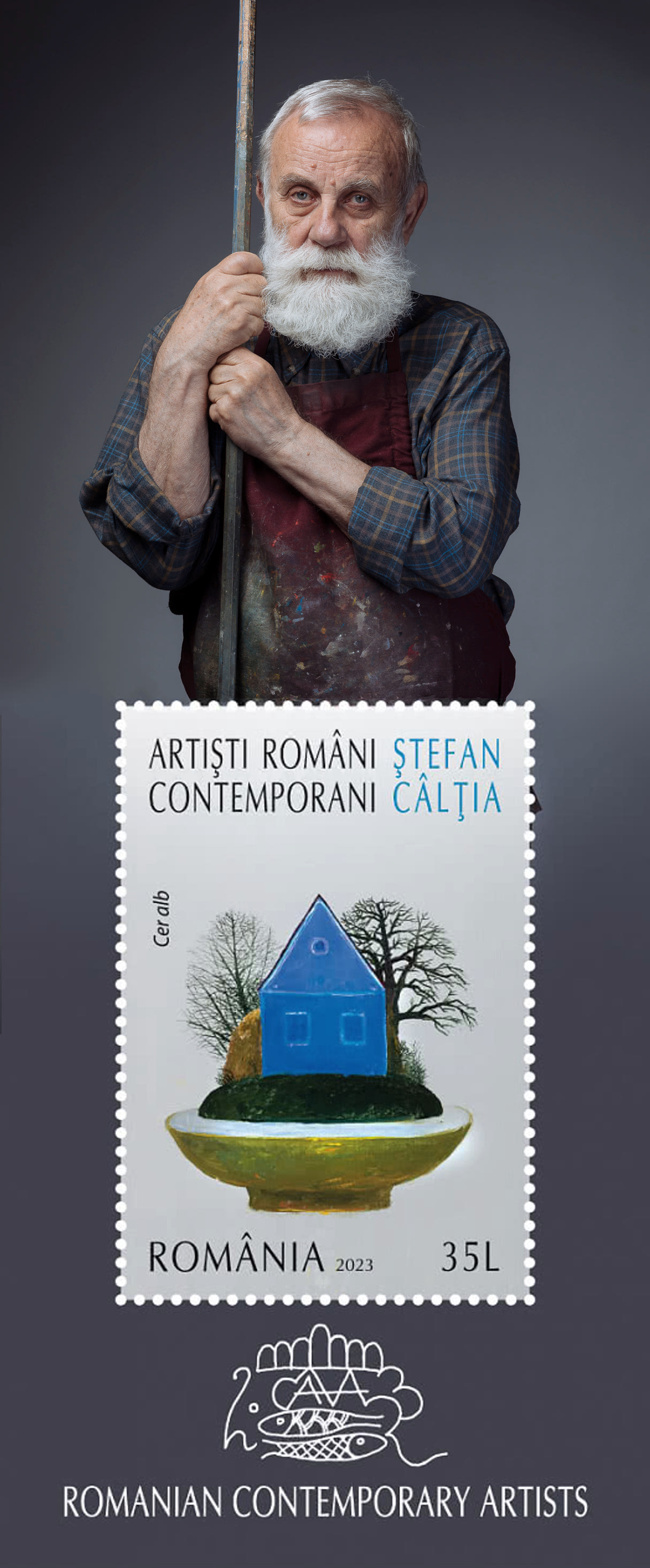
Câlția and his work Blue Sky on a 2023 stamp sheet of Romania

Ștefan Câlția (born 15 May 1942) is a contemporary Romanian painter.

Born in Brașov, he attended the arts and music high school in Timișoara from 1959 to 1963, having Julius Podlipny as a teacher. He then graduated in 1970 from the Nicolae Grigorescu Institute of Fine Arts in Bucharest, having Corneliu Baba as a teacher.

Since the 1970s, Câlția has held exhibitions in Norway, Switzerland, the Netherlands, Denmark, and Romania. In 1993 he became professor at the National University of Fine Arts in Bucharest, and in 2004 he became its chancellor. His works have been acquired by many important museums and art galleries around the world, such as the Norwegian Museum of Contemporary Art in Oslo, Norway, and the Museum of Fantastic Arts in Gruyère, Switzerland.

He is the most sold Romanian painter.

== Honours ==
- (Romania) Romanian Royal Family: 58th Knight of the Royal Decoration of the Cross of the Romanian Royal House
