= Corneliu Baba =

Romanian painter (1906–1997)

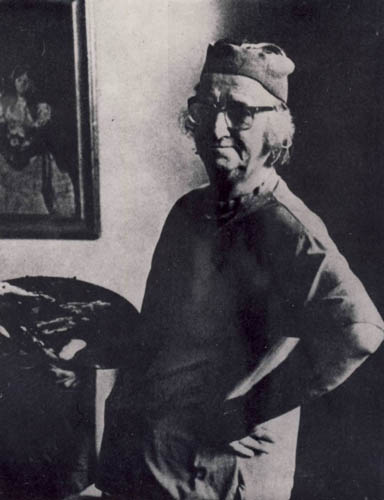
- Born: 18 November 1906; Craiova, Kingdom of Romania
- Died: 28 December 1997 (aged 91); Bucharest, Romania
- Known for: Painting, books illustrator
- Awards: Order of the Star of the Romanian Socialist Republic

Corneliu Baba (Romanian pronunciation: [korˈnelju ˈbaba]; 18 November 1906, Craiova – 28 December 1997) was a Romanian painter, primarily a portraitist, but also known as a genre painter and an illustrator of books.

== Early life ==
Having first studied under his father, the academic painter Gheorghe Baba, Baba studied briefly at the National School of Fine Arts in Bucharest, but did not receive a degree. His first public exhibition was in 1934 in the spa town of Băile Herculane; this led to his studying later that year under Nicolae Tonitza in Iași, finally receiving a diploma in Fine Arts from the Iași Academy of Fine Arts in 1938, where he was named assistant to the Chair of Painting in 1939 and a Professor of Painting in 1946.

Shortly after his 1948 official debut with a painting called The Chess Player at the Art Salon in Bucharest, he was arrested and briefly imprisoned in Galata Prison in Iași. The following year he was suspended without explanation from his faculty position and moved from Iași to Bucharest.

Despite an initially uneasy relationship with communist authorities who denounced him as formalist, Baba soon established himself as an illustrator and artist. In 1955 he was allowed to travel to the Soviet Union, and won a Gold Medal in an international exhibition in Warsaw, Poland. In 1956, Baba accompanied The Chess Player and two other paintings shown at the Venice Biennale, after which the paintings traveled on to exhibits in Moscow, Leningrad, and Prague.

== Fame ==
Cover of Pavel Susara's book Corneliu Baba: detail from Tudor Arghezi with his wife, 1961.

In 1958 Baba was appointed Professor of Painting at the Nicolae Grigorescu Institute of Fine Arts in Bucharest, where Niculiţă Secrieriu and Ștefan Câlția were among his pupils. The same year he received the title of Emeritus Master of Art. By this time, his earlier problems with the communist authorities appear to have been smoothed over. In the next decade, both he and his paintings were to travel the world, participating in exhibitions in places as diverse as Cairo, Helsinki, Vienna, and New Delhi, culminating in a 1964 solo exhibition in Brussels. In 1962, the Romanian government gave him the title of People's Artist; in 1963 he was appointed a corresponding member of the Romanian Academy, and in 1964 was similarly honored by the East Berlin Academy of Fine Art.

Honors and exhibitions continued to accumulate, ranging from a 1970 solo exhibition in New York City to the receipt of the Order of the Star of the Romanian Socialist Republic, 2nd class in 1971. While his name became a household word in Romania and, to a lesser extent, throughout the Eastern bloc, he never achieved comparable fame in the West.

In 1988, Baba was seriously injured by an accident in his studio, and was immobilized for several months. In 1990, following the Romanian Revolution, he was elevated to titular membership in the Romanian Academy. Shortly before his death in 1997, Baba published his memoir, Notes by an Artist of Eastern Europe. He was posthumously awarded the Prize for Excellence by the Romanian Cultural Foundation.

Corneliu Baba appears in the People of influence painting of Chinese artists Zhang An, Li Tiezi, and Dai Dudu.

In 2019, the Han Yuchen Museum in Handan (China) presented the largest Corneliu Baba Chinese museum retrospective.

== Art ==
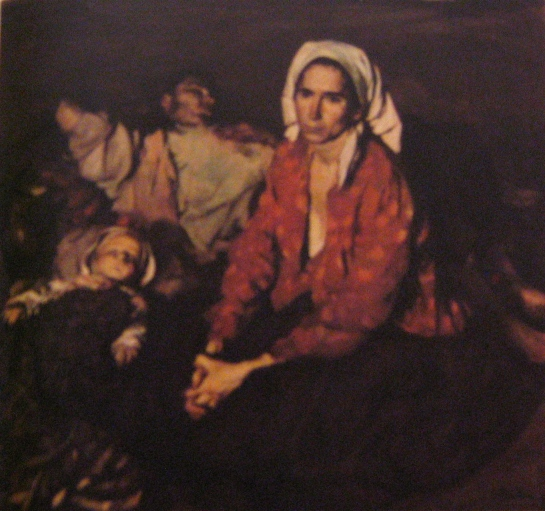
Odihnă pe câmp, (1956)

Perhaps unfashionably for a 20th-century painter, Baba consciously worked in the tradition of the Old Masters, although, from the outset of his studies with his father, he was also influenced by expressionism, Art Nouveau, academicism and "remnants" of Impressionism. Baba himself cited El Greco, Rembrandt, and Goya as particularly strong influences. This did not put him in good stead either with the official Socialist realism of the Eastern bloc (where, especially in the early Communist years, he periodically received damning criticism—and sometimes punishment, such as being suspended from teaching—for his "formalism").

Nearly all of Corneliu Baba's work remains in Romania; hardly a major museum in that country is without some of his work. The Art Museum in Timișoara possesses a very nice and rich collection (over 80 works) of Baba's paintings. Among his notable works are a 1952 portrait of Mihail Sadoveanu (now in Bucharest's National Art Museum) and a 1957 portrait of Krikor Zambaccian, (now in the Zambaccian Museum, also in Bucharest). One of his few pieces on public display outside of Romania is a rather impressionistic 1977-79 group scene entitled Fear, (one of several in a "Fears" series) in the Szépművészeti Museum in Budapest.

Throughout the 1970s and 1980s, Baba did an extensive series of paintings of Harlequins and "Mad Kings"; most of the latter remained in the artist's personal collection until his death, much as with Francisco Goya and his "black paintings".
