= Nicolae Grigorescu =

Romanian painter (1838–1907)

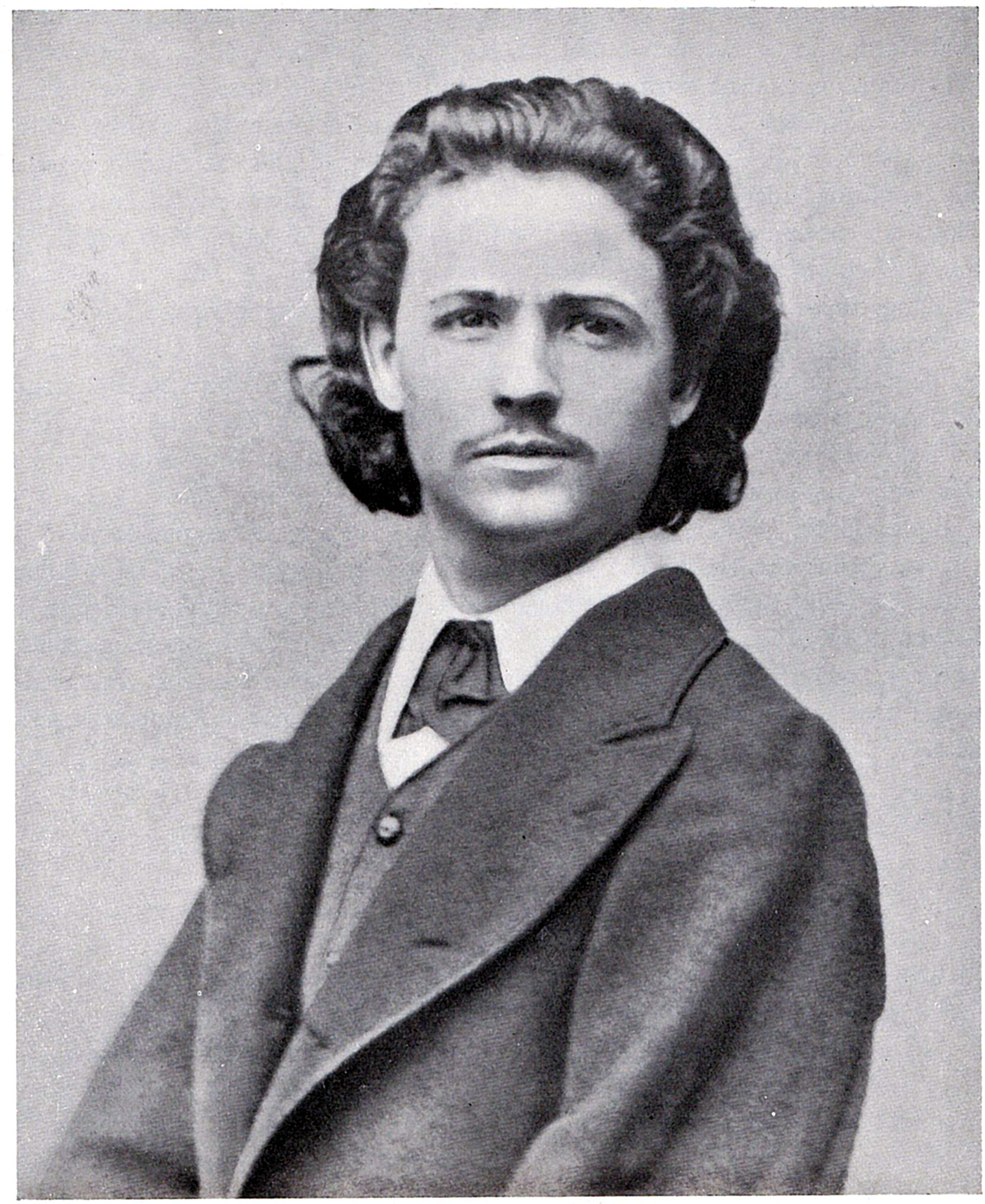
- Grigorescu in 1860
- Born: Nicolae Grigorescu; 15 May 1838; Pitaru, Dâmbovița County, Wallachia
- Died: 21 July 1907 (aged 69); Câmpina, Kingdom of Romania
- Education: École nationale supérieure des Beaux-Arts
- Known for: Painting, drawing
- Notable work: Țărancă din Muscel, Car cu boi, Atacul de la Smârdan, Fata cu basmaua galbenă
- Movement: Barbizon school, Impressionism

Nicolae Grigorescu (Romanian pronunciation: [nikoˈla.e ɡriɡoˈresku]; 15 May 1838 – 21 July 1907) was one of the founders of modern Romanian painting. He is considered by Romanians the greatest Romanian painter, and one of the founders of modern Romanian art. He is most known for paintings depicting rural life. He was one of the most respected and internationally known painters from Romania.

There is a metro station named after Grigorescu in Bucharest. It was given his name in 1990, before which it was named after Communist army general Leontin Sălăjan. Romanian currency features Grigorescu on the 10 lei bank note.

== Early life ==
He was born in Pitaru, Dâmbovița County, as the sixth of the seven children of Ion Grigorescu (died 1845) and tailor Ruxandra Grigorescu. Wallachia now called Romania. In 1843 his family moved to Bucharest. At a young age, his father, Ion Grigorescu, died when Nicolae was 7. In 1848, he became an apprentice at the workshop of the Romanian painter of Czech origins Anton Chladek and created icons for the church of Băicoi and the Căldărușani Monastery. His brother, Gheorghe Grigorescu (1835–1912) also worked for Chladek. His time working for Chladek would inspire his career, even though he left his workshop in 1850. In 1856 he created the historical composition Mihai scăpând stindardul (Michael the Brave saving the flag), which he presented to the Wallachian Prince Barbu Ştirbei, together with a petition asking for financial aid for his studies.

Between 1856 and 1857, he painted the church of the Zamfira monastery, Prahova County, and in 1861 the church of the Agapia monastery. With the help of Mihail Kogălniceanu, he received a scholarship to study in France.

== Studies and Career ==
In the autumn of 1861, young Grigorescu left for Paris, where he studied at the École des Beaux-Arts. He also attended the workshop of Sébastien Cornu, where he had as a colleague Pierre-Auguste Renoir. Knowing his weaknesses, he concentrated drawing and composition. However, he soon left this workshop and, attracted by the artistic concepts of the Barbizon school, he left Paris for that village, where he became the associate of artists such as Jean-François Millet, Jean-Baptiste-Camille Corot, Gustave Courbet and Théodore Rousseau. Under the influence of the movement, Grigorescu looked for new means of expression and followed the trend of en plein air painting, which was also important in Impressionism. As part of the Universal Exposition of Paris (1867), he contributed seven works. Then he exhibited at the Paris Salon of 1868 the painting Tânără ţigancă (Young Gypsy girl).

He returned to Romania a few times and starting in 1870 he participated in the exhibits of living artists and those organized by the Society of the Friends of the Belle-Arts. Between 1873 and 1874 he traveled to Italy, Greece and Vienna.

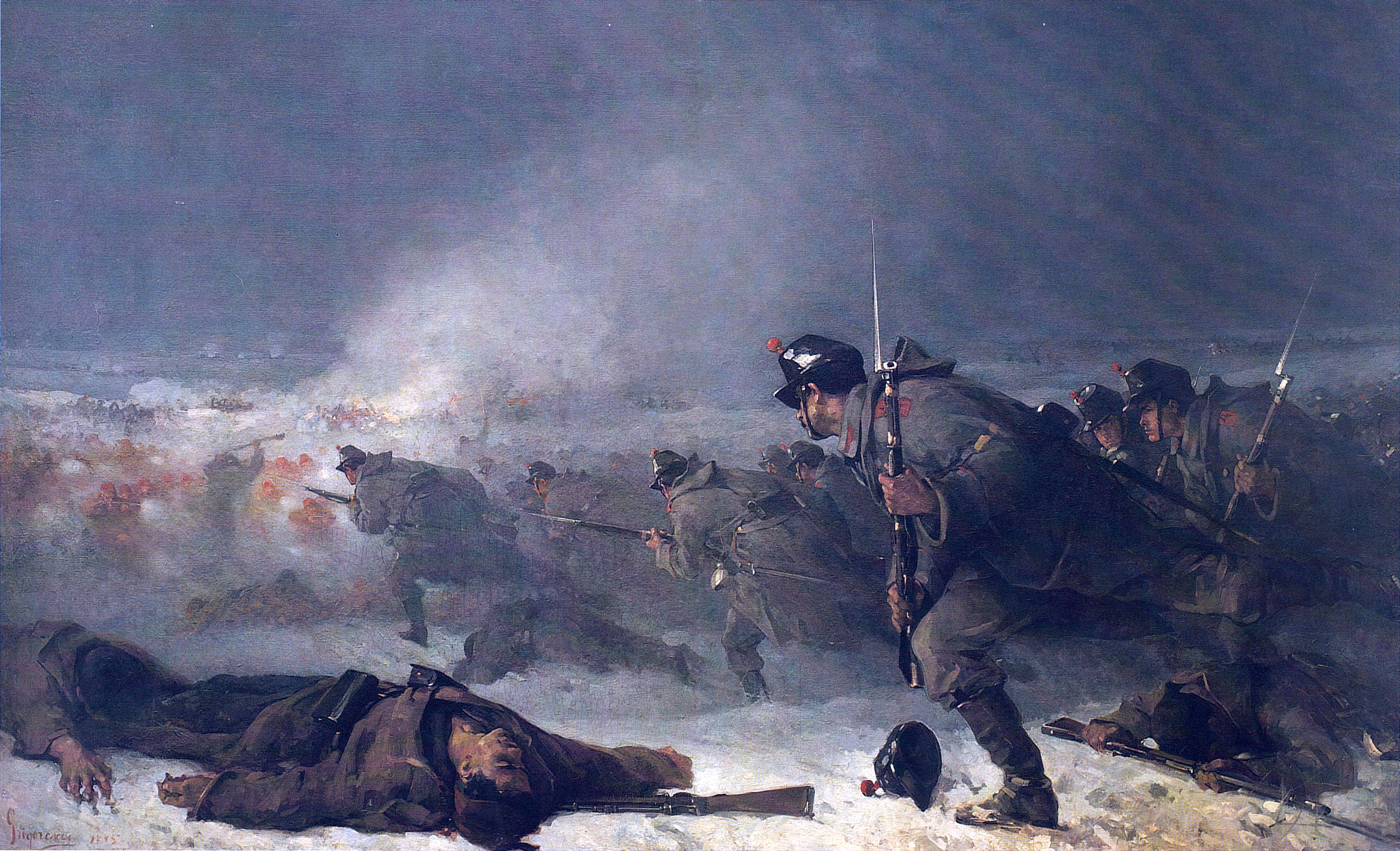
The Smârdan Attack, 1885

In 1877 he was called to accompany the Romanian Army as a "frontline painter" in the Romanian War of Independence. During the battles at the Grivitsa Strongpoint and Oryahovo, he made drawings and sketches which later used in creating larger-scale works.

In 1889 his work was featured in the Universal Exhibition in Paris and at the Romanian Atheneum. Centerpiece exhibits took place at the Romanian Atheneum would follow in 1891, 1895, 1897, 1902, and 1905.

From 1879 to 1890 he worked in France, especially in Vitré, Brittany, and in his workshop in Paris. In 1890 he settled in Câmpina and started depicting pastoral themes, especially portraits of peasant girls, pictures of ox carts on dusty country roads and other landscapes. He was named honorary member of the Romanian Academy in 1899.

At the time of his death, Grigorescu had been working on his Întoarcerea de la bâlci (The Return from the Fair). His house in Câmpina opened as the Nicolae Grigorescu Memorial Museum in 1957.

== Selected paintings ==
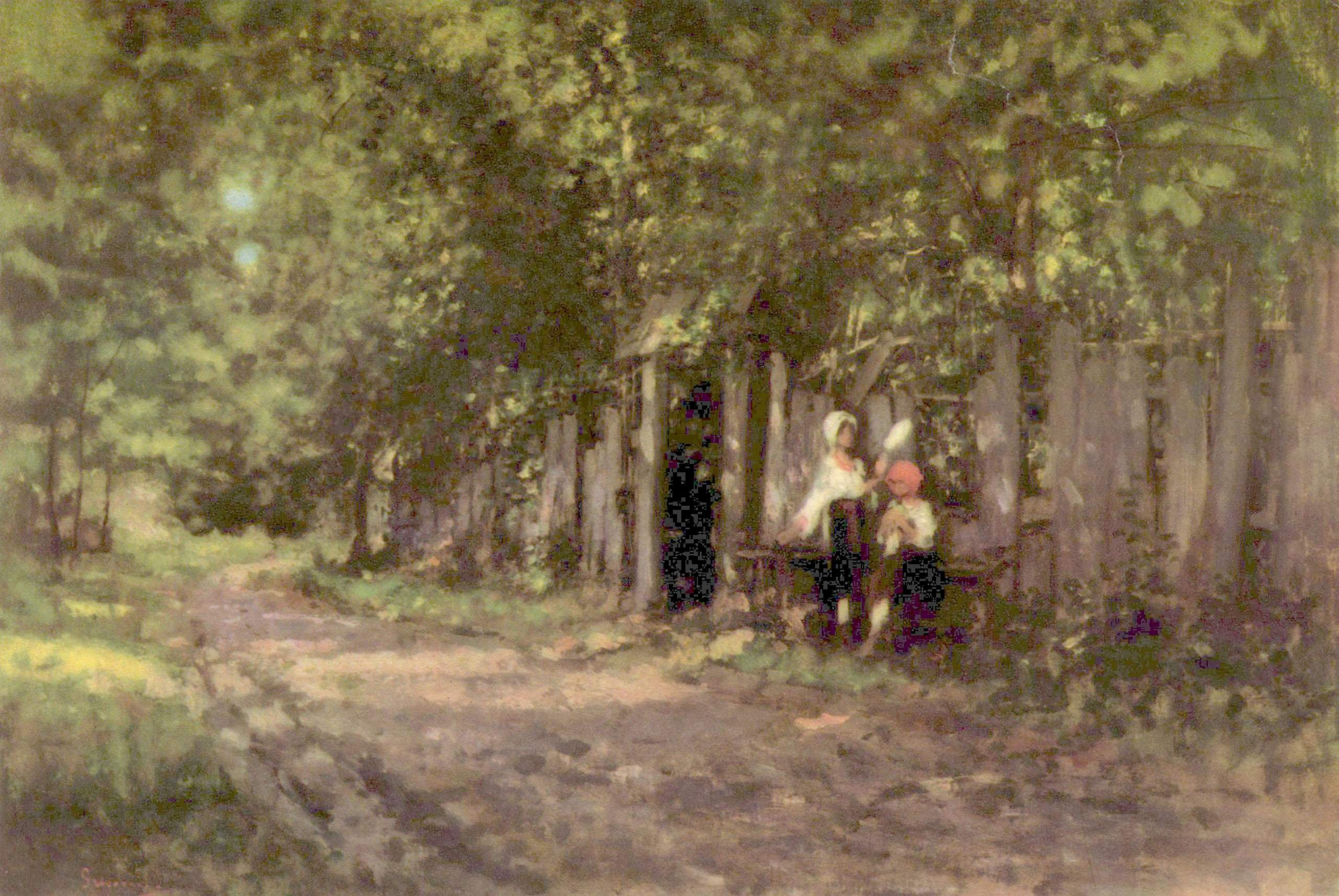
Girls Spinning at the Gate

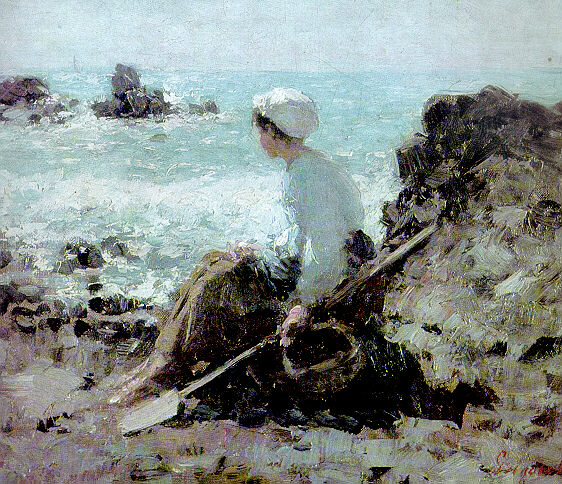
Fisherwoman at Grandville

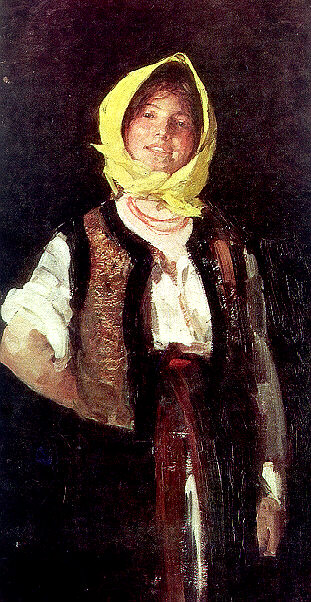
Joyful Peasant Woman

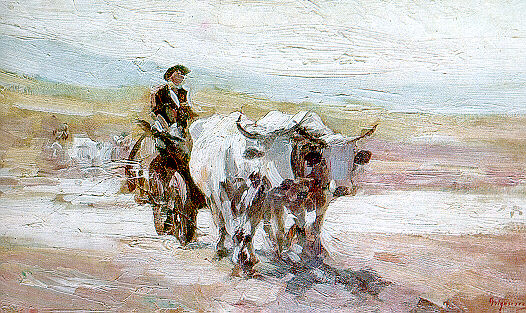
Oxcart

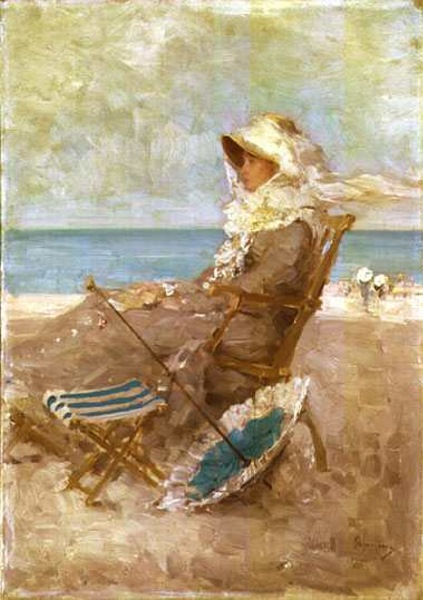
Woman on the Beach

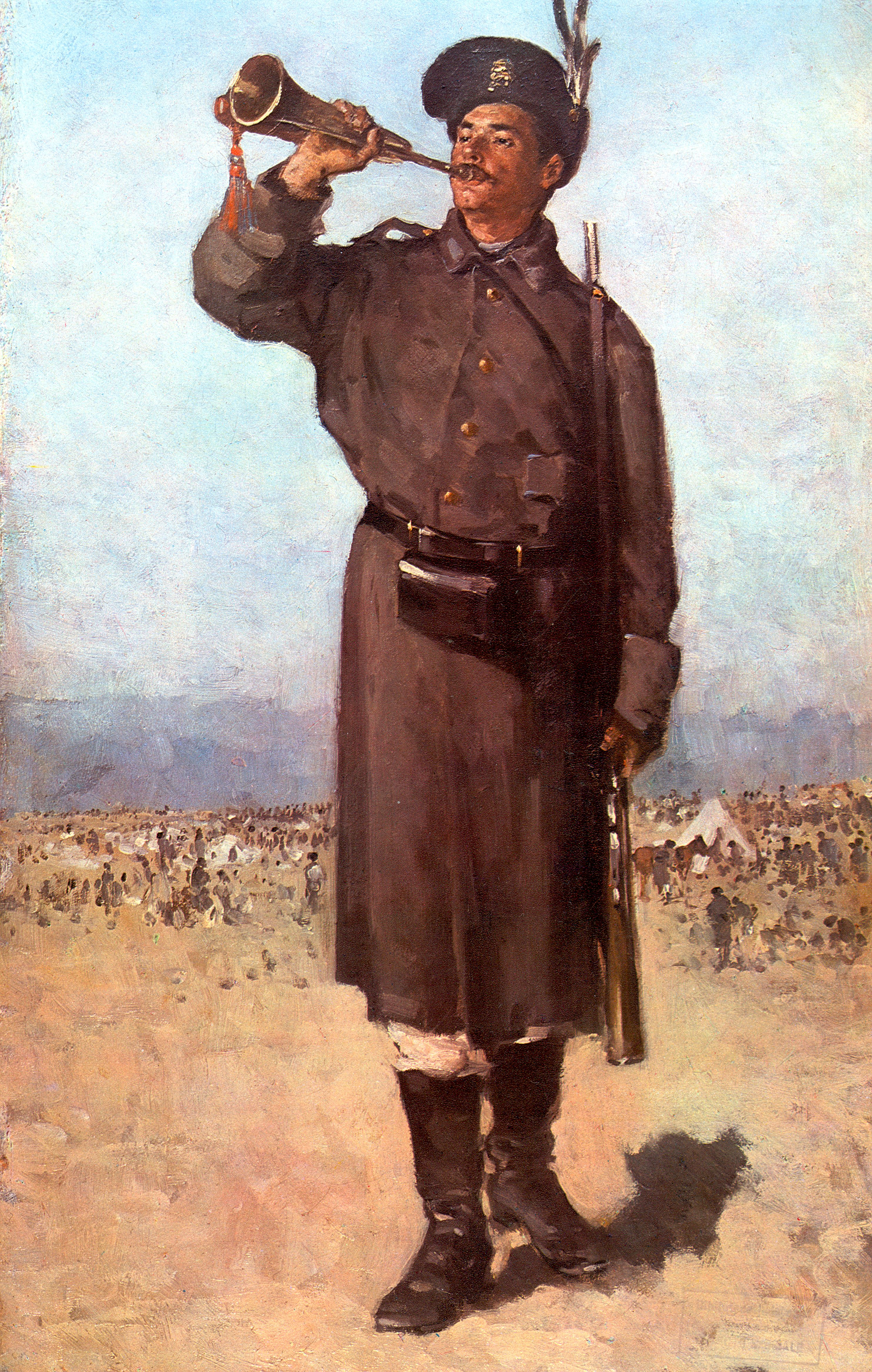
Bugler

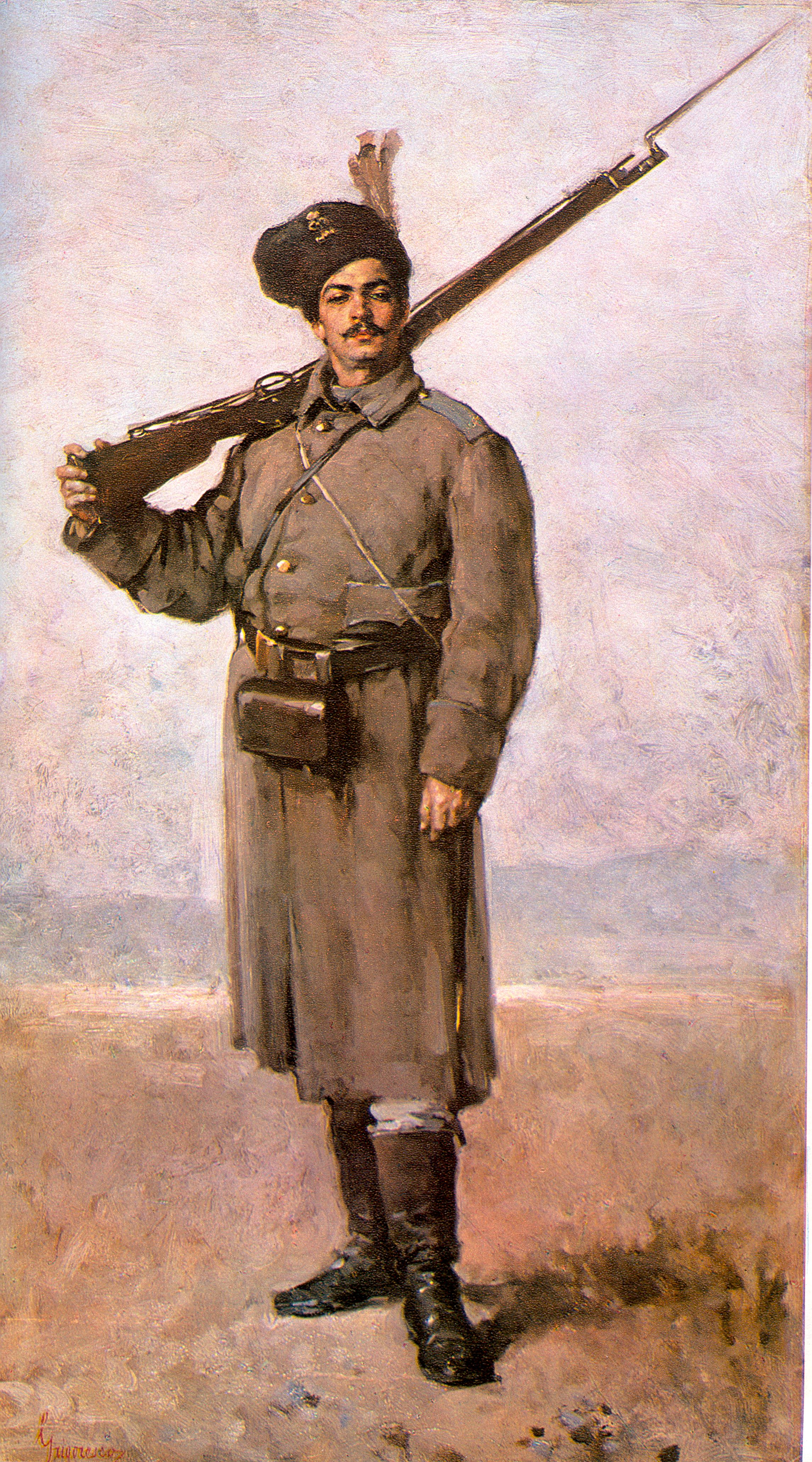
Guardsman

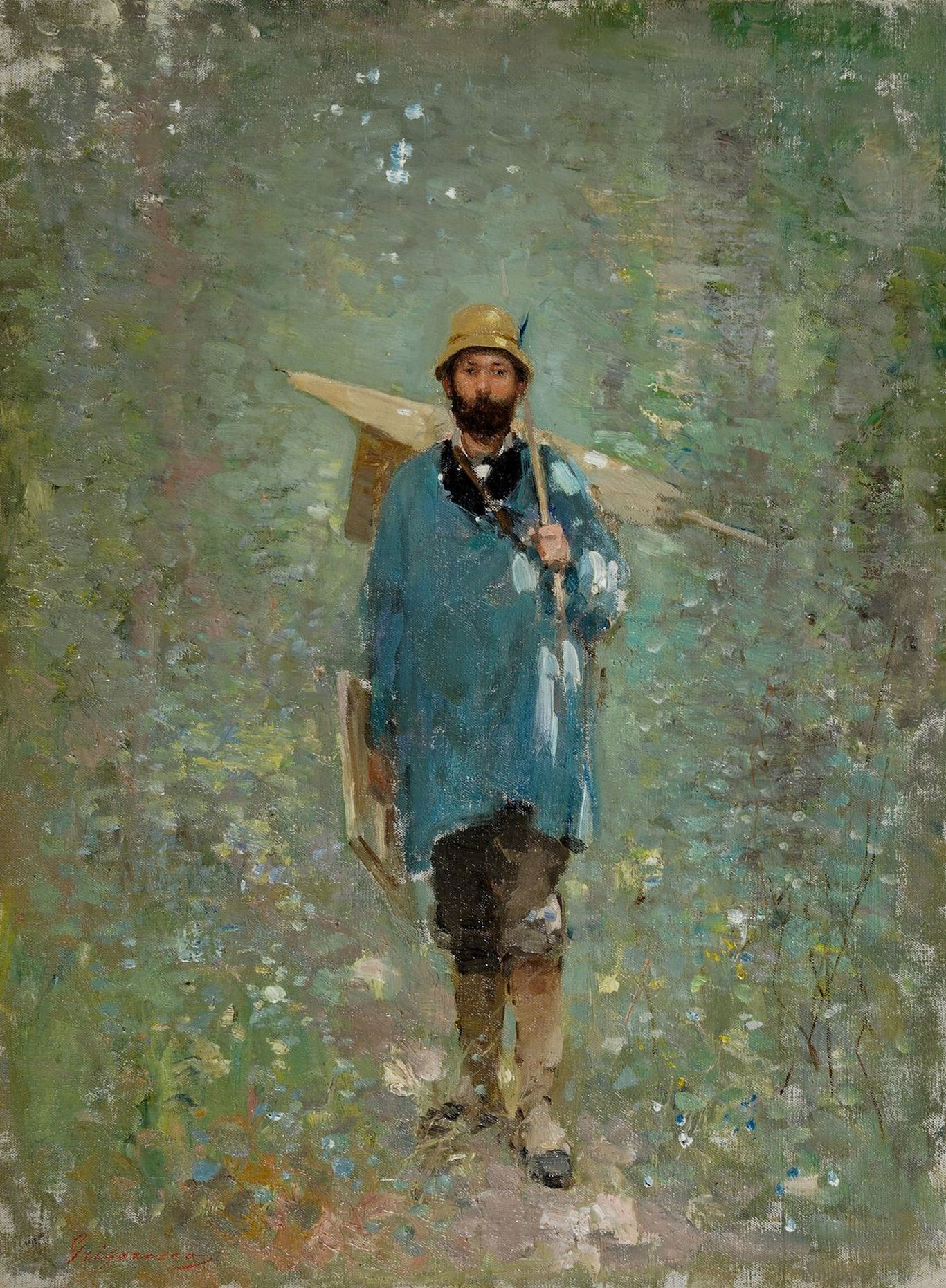
Andreescu at Barbizon

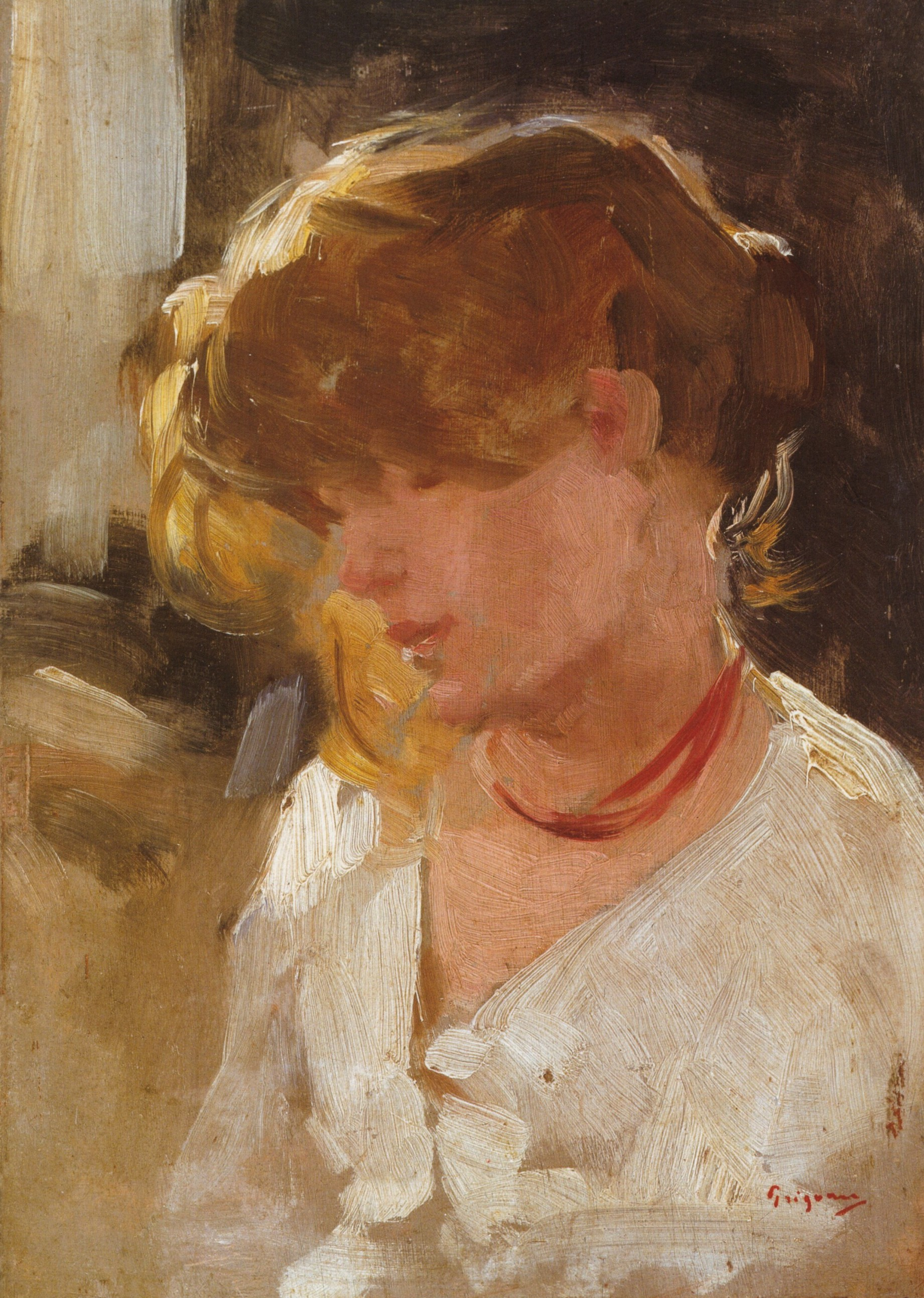
Head of a Peasant

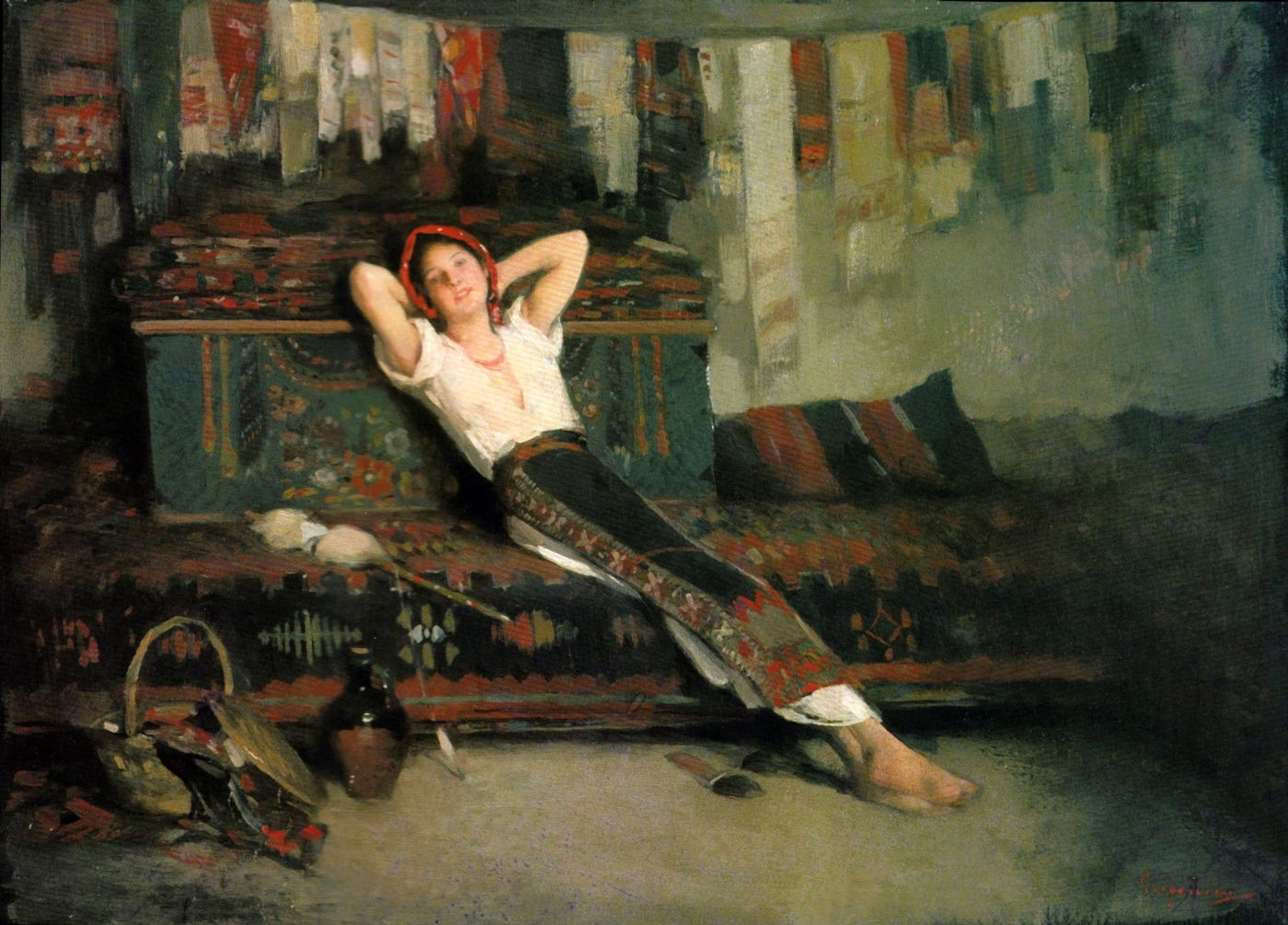
Girl with Her Dowry

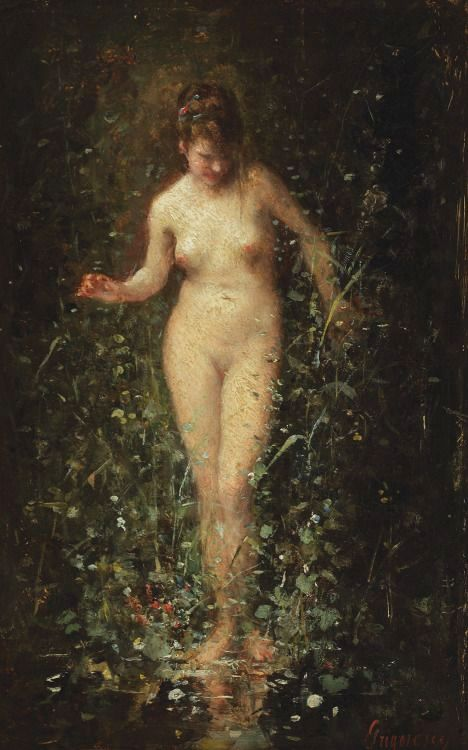
Entering the Bath

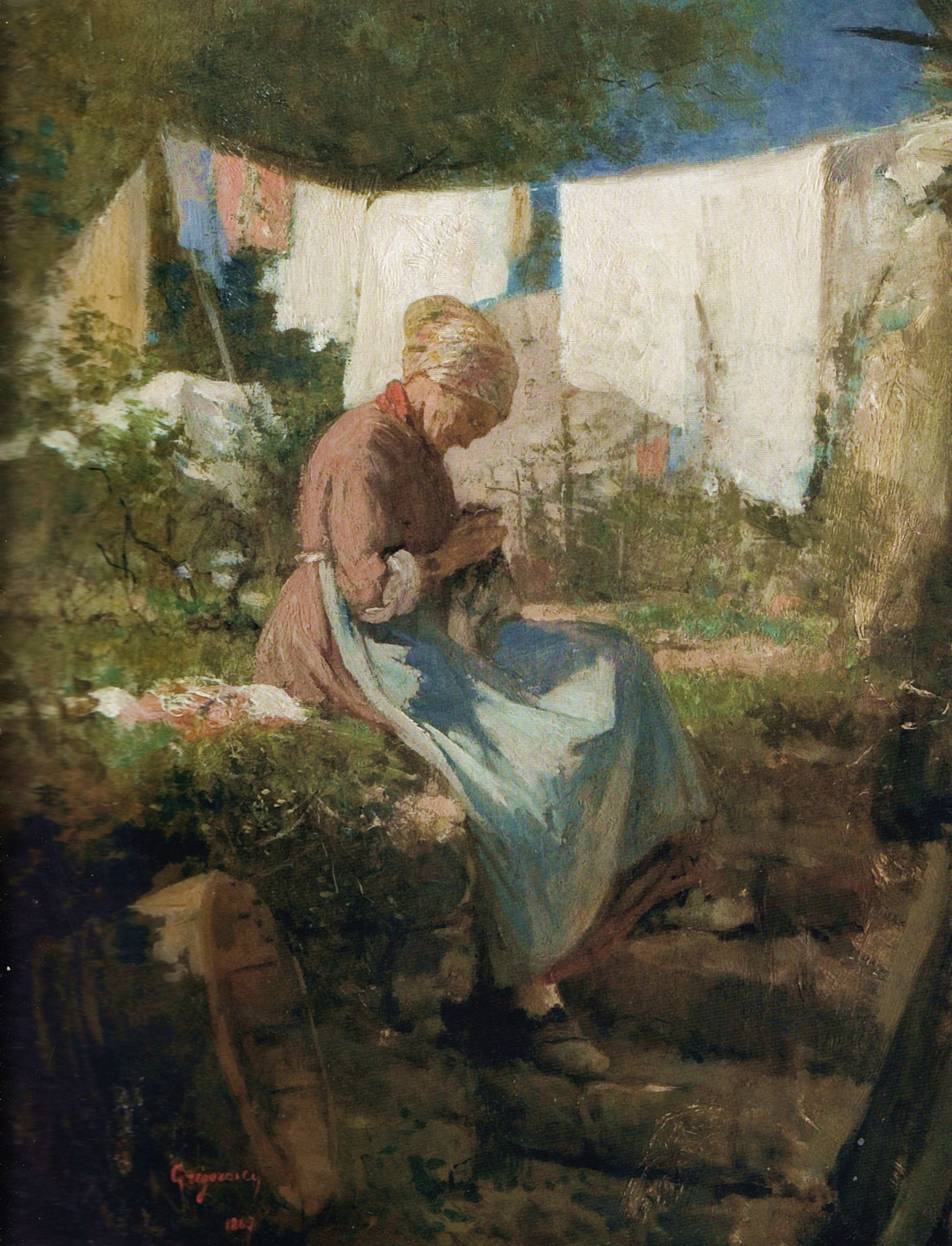
Old Woman Darning

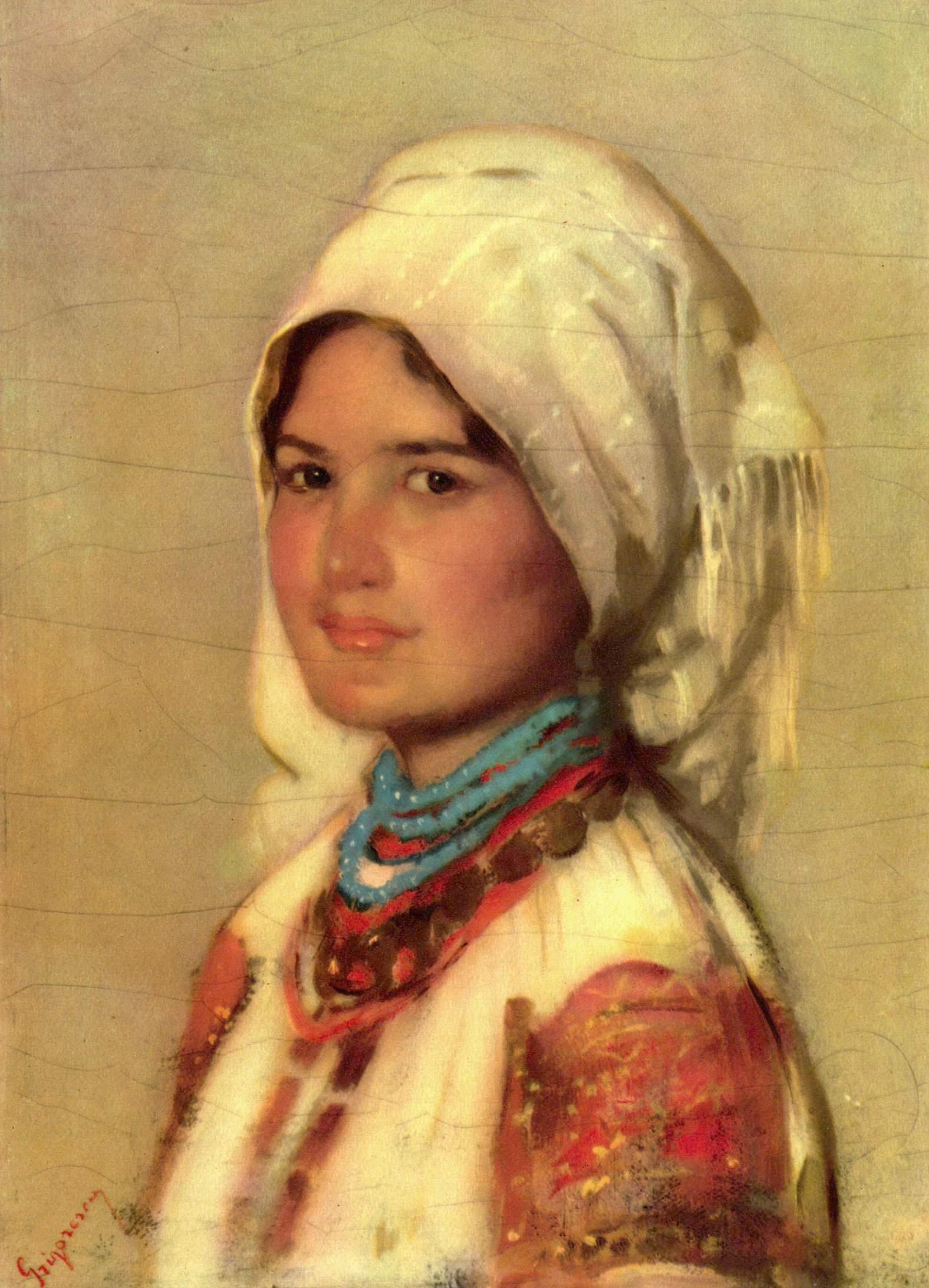
Peasant from Muscel

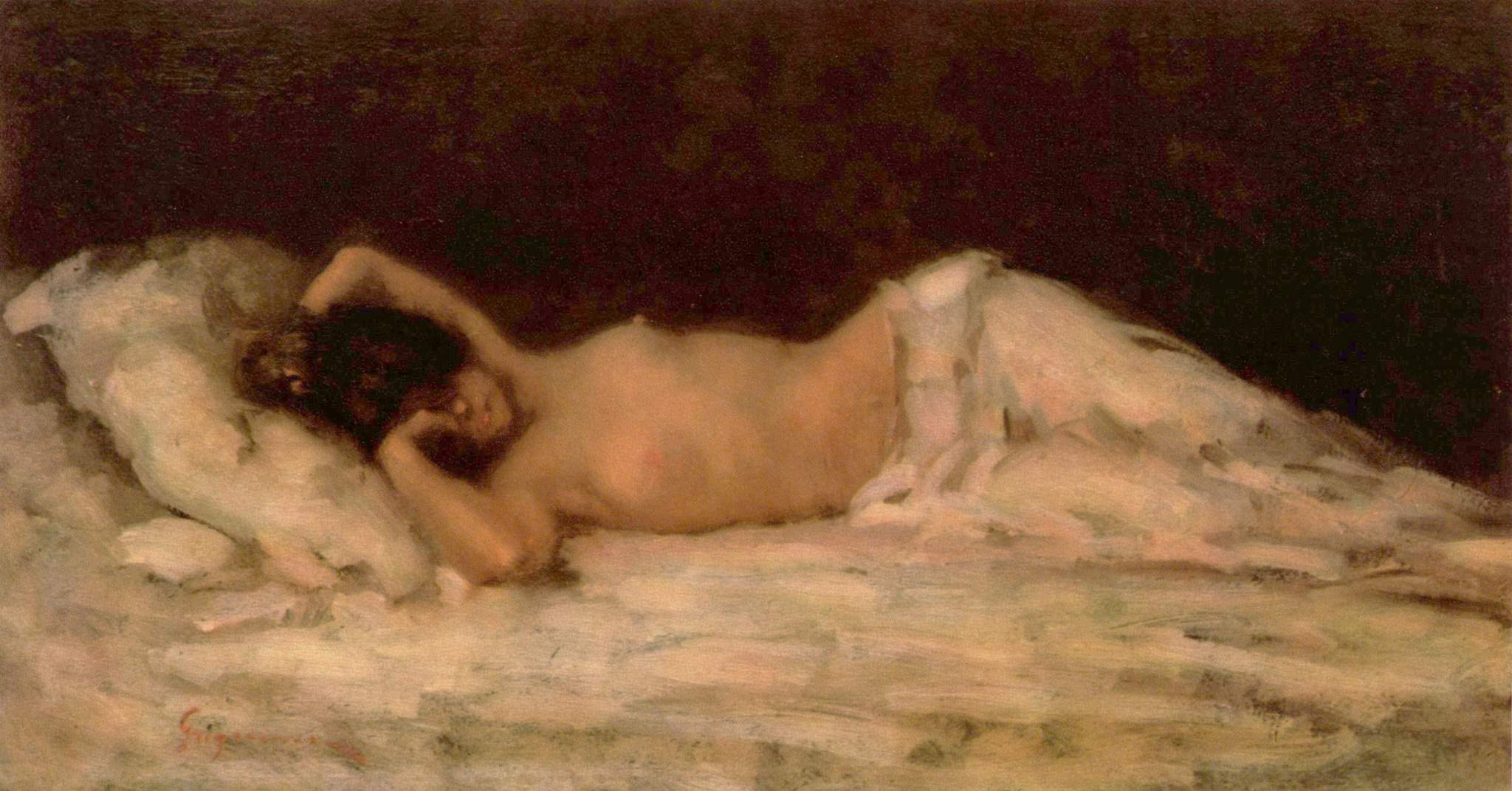
Nude

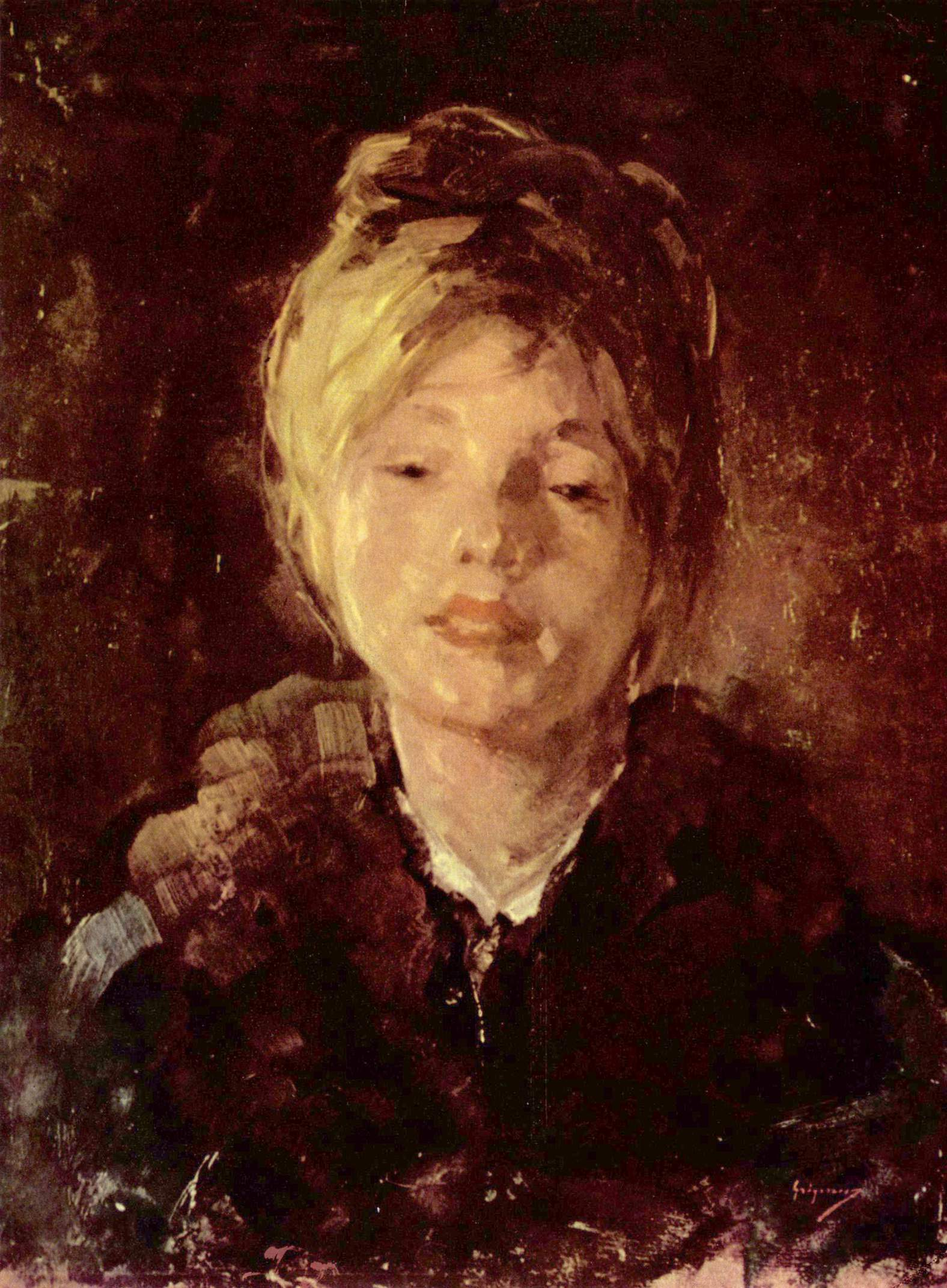
Portrait of a Girl

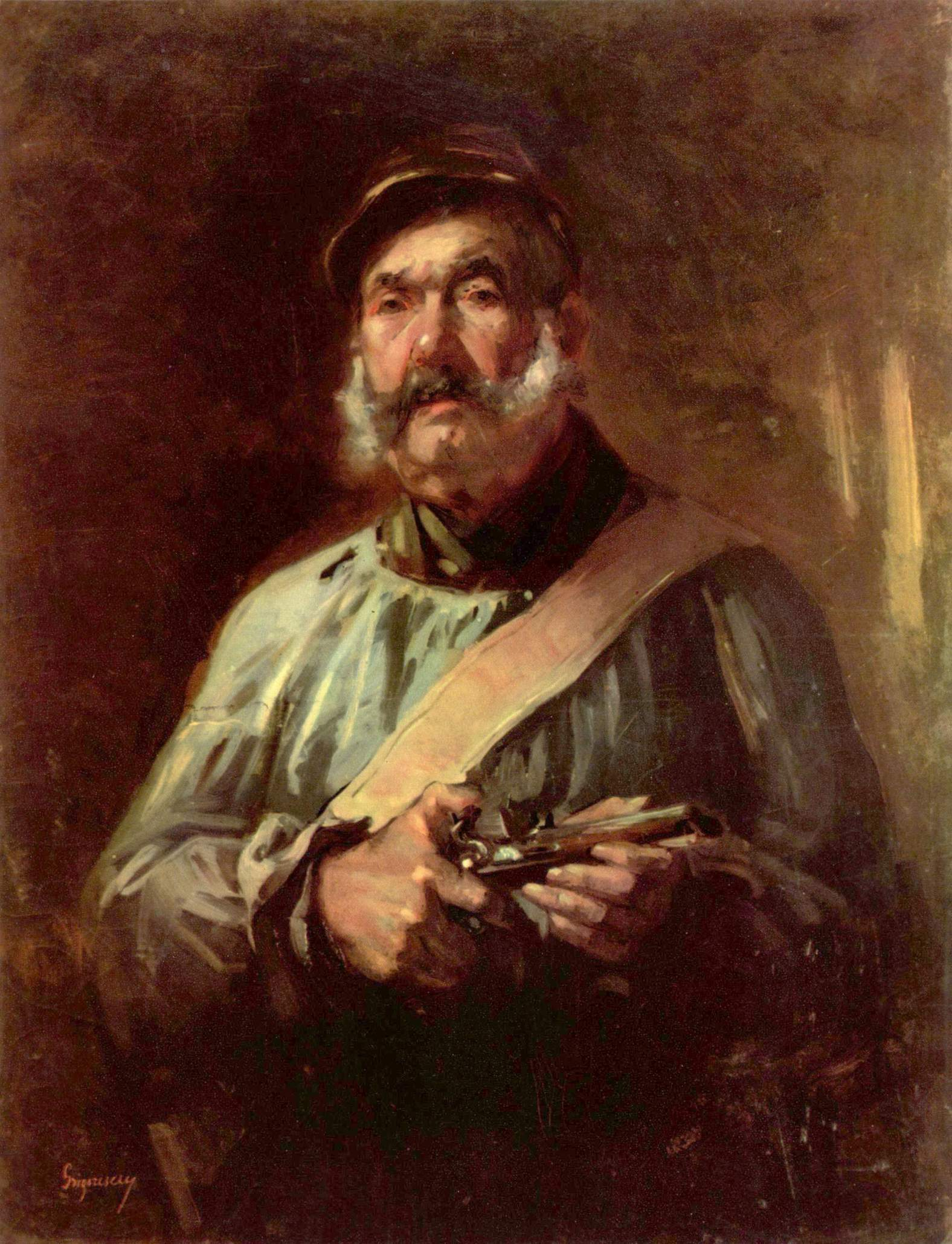
The Guardian of Chailly

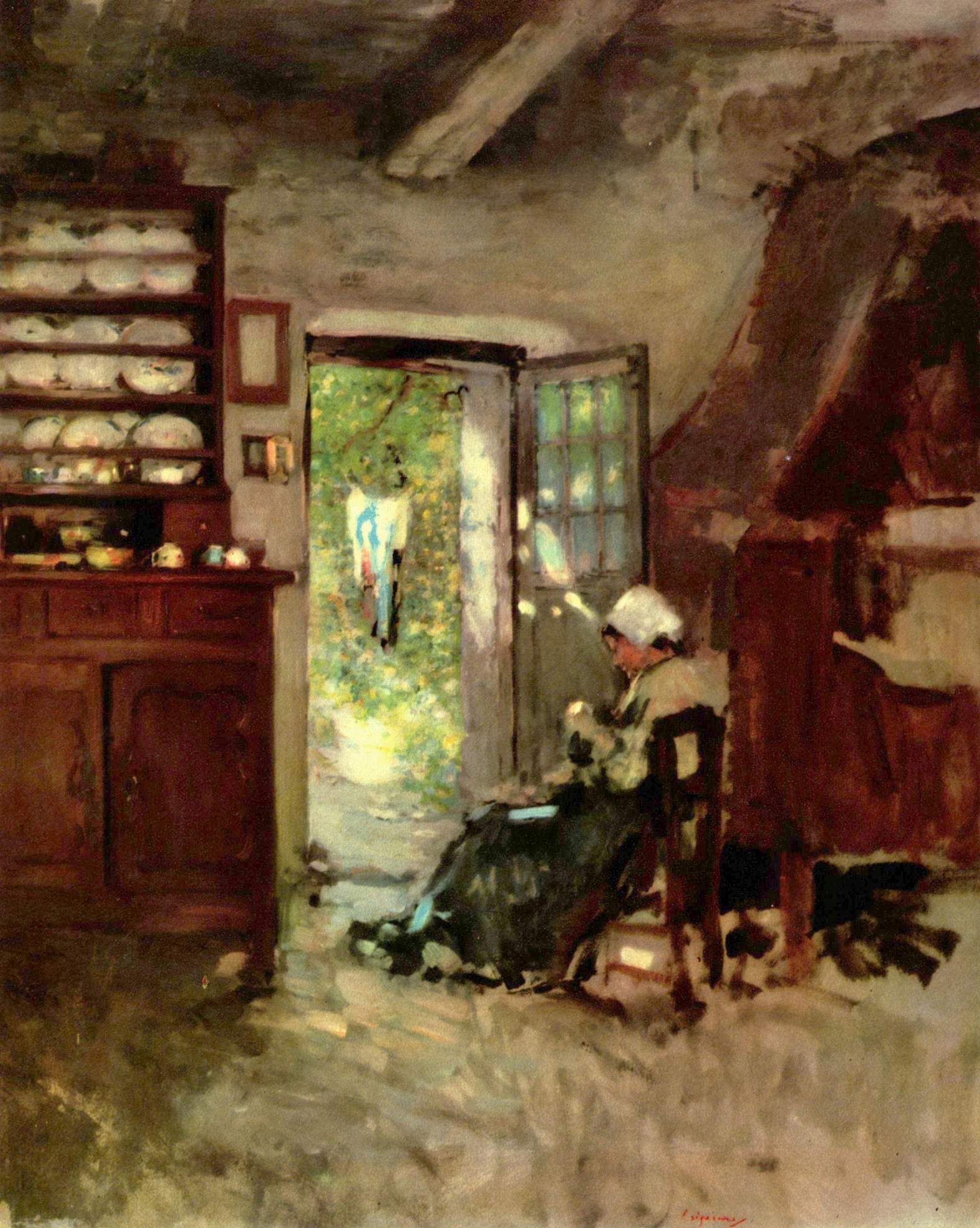
Interior in Vitré

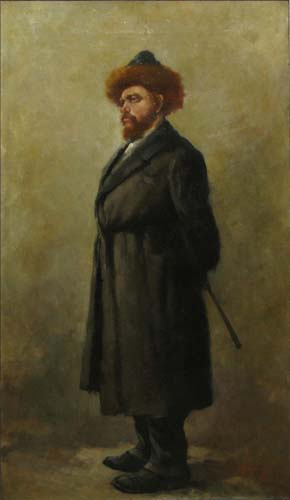
Hebrew with Caftan

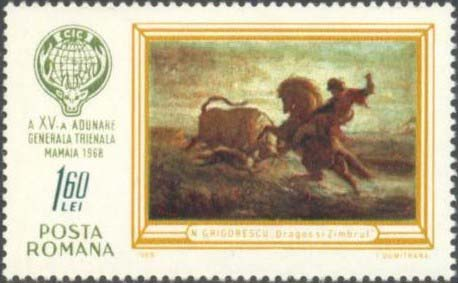
Prince Dragos and the Bison

== Sources ==
- Virgil Cioflec: Grigorescu, Editura Cultura Națională, Bucharest, 1925
- Barbu Brezianu: Nicolae Grigorescu, Tineretului, Bucharest, 1959
- George Oprescu and Remus Niculescu: Nicolae Grigorescu, 2 vol. Curier Rapid, Bucharest, 1961–1962
- Mircea Popescu: "N. Grigorescu", series: Arta pentru toți, Editura Meridiane, Bucharest, 1962
- Alexandru Vlahuță: Pictorul Nicolae Grigorescu, Editura Tineretului, Bucharest, 1969
- George Sorin Movileanu and Vasile Florea: Grigorescu, Editura Meridiane, Bucharest, 1978
- Mariana Vida and Monica Enache: Grigorescu – Commemorative album on the 100th anniversary of the artist's death, edited by the National Art Museum of Romania on the occasion of the retrospective exhibition "Grigorescu painter of nature" held at the Gallery, 2007
- Alexandru Cebuc: Grigorescu, Editura Monitorul Oficial al României, Bucharest, 2008 ISBN 978-973-567-627-8
- Iulia Iliescu and Marina Motroc: Viața și opera lui Grigorescu, Editura Monitorul Oficial R.A., Bucharest, 2009 ISBN 978-606-539-105-5
