= Sandrino =

Sandrino may refer to:

== People ==
Given name

- Sandrino Braun-Schumacher (born 1988), German footballer
- Sandrino Castec (1960–2024), Chilean footballer
- Sandrino Gavriloaia (1960–2025), Romanian journalist

Surname

- Tommaso Sandrino (1575–1631), Italian painter
