= Oprescu =

Oprescu is a Romanian surname. Notable people with the surname include:

- George Oprescu (1881–1969), Romanian art critic and historian
- Nicolae Oprescu (born 1953), Romanian artistic gymnast
- Sorin Oprescu (born 1951), Romanian politician and doctor
