= Girls Spinning at the Gate =

Painting by Nicolae Grigorescu

- Fete lucrând la poartă (Romanian)
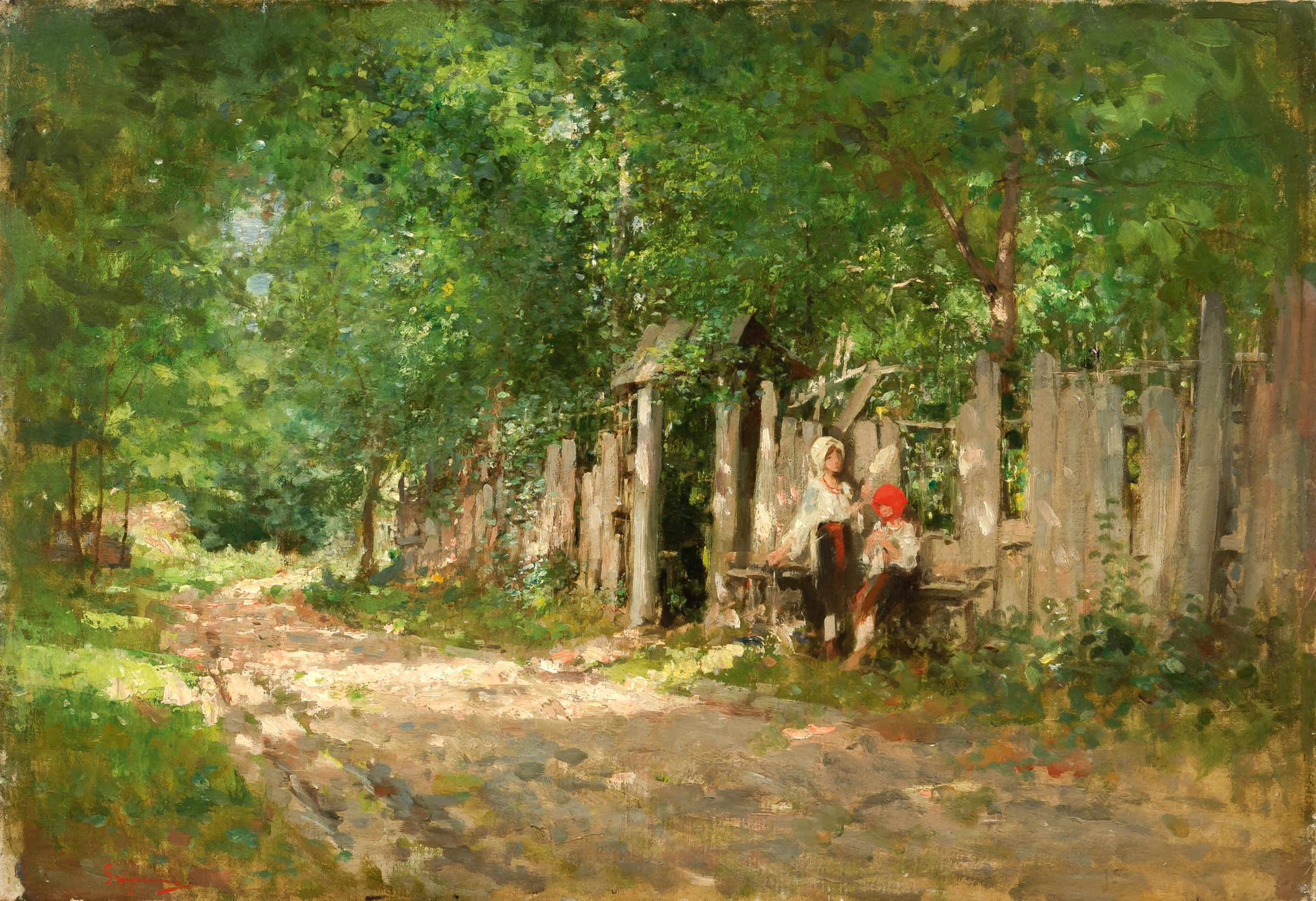
- Artist: Nicolae Grigorescu
- Year: 1885-1890
- Medium: oil on canvas
- Dimensions: 42.5 cm × 62.5 cm (16.7 in × 24.6 in)
- Location: National Museum of Art of Romania; Bucharest

Girls Spinning at the Gate (Romanian: Fete lucrând la poartă) is a painting by Romanian painter Nicolae Grigorescu, from the period 1885 to 1890.

== Description ==
The painting has dimensions of 42.5 x 62.5 centimeters.

The picture belongs to the National Museum of Art of Romania, Bucharest.

== Analysis ==
The picture shows two people in folk costumes sitting on a bench near a gate in a wood fence, and spinning, while light brings the surrounding landscape into the foreground.
