= Nicolae Grigorescu Memorial Museum =

Coordinates: 45°08′05″N 25°43′58″E

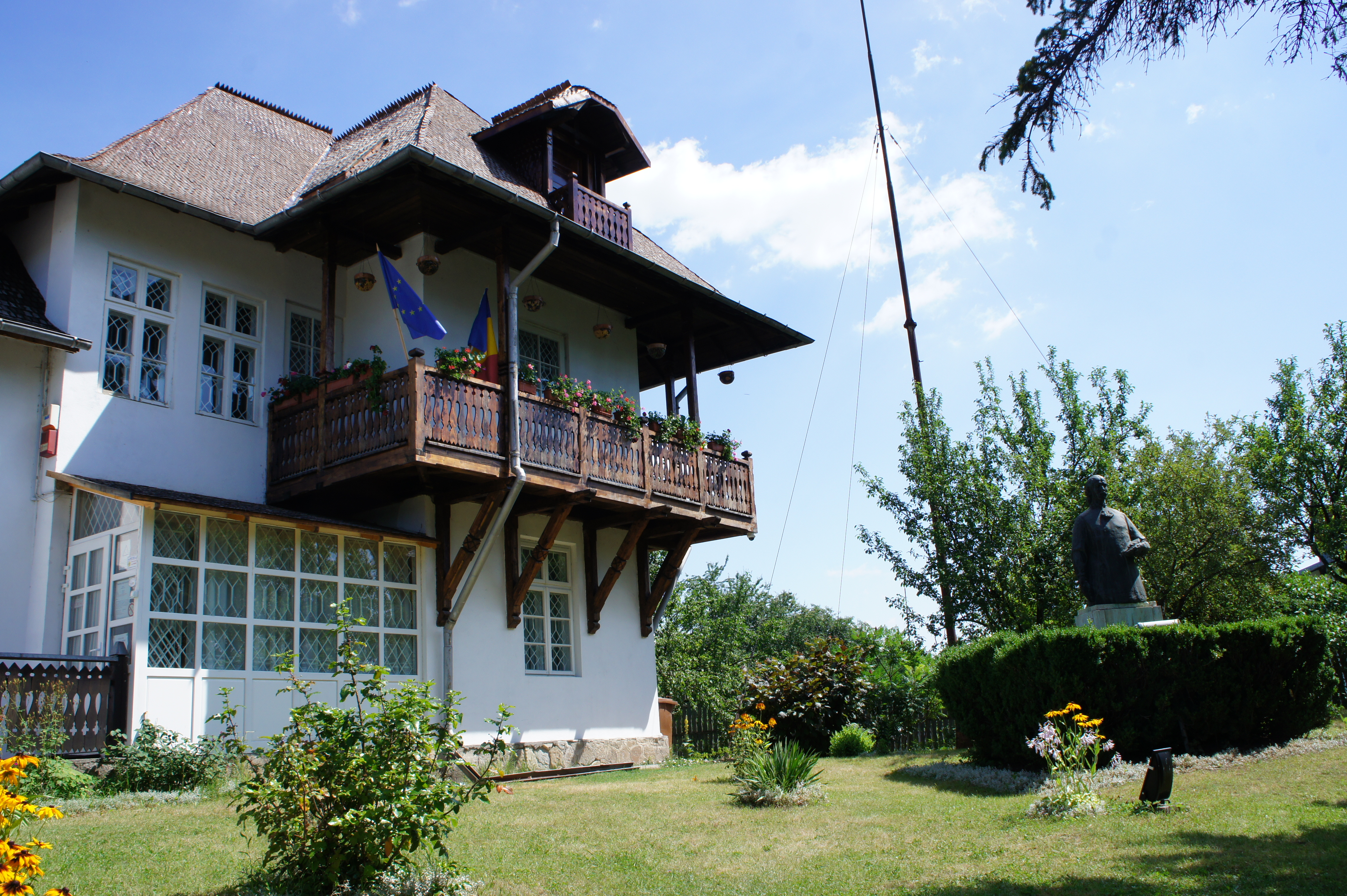
Nicolae Grigorescu Memorial Museum

The Nicolae Grigorescu Memorial Museum (Romanian: Muzeul Memorial Nicolae Grigorescu) is a museum located at 166 Carol I Boulevard, Câmpina, Romania.

The house that hosts the museum was originally built in 1901–1904 for painter Nicolae Grigorescu, his wife and son. He designed the building himself in the local style: eight rooms on two floors, balconies on three sides and a shingle roof. Grigorescu lived there until his death in 1907. The family continued to occupy the house until 1918, when it burned, destroying the studio.

The house remained in ruins until 1951–1952, when the local authorities decided to rebuild it. The reconstruction was aided by the artist’s son and by his assistant. The building was finished quickly, and a memorial museum was assembled between 1955 and 1957. The interior design was aided by photographs from 1904 and 1908, and slides from 1910. Exhibits were purchased from the family or from private individuals to whom the descendants had sold them.

The reconstructed studio is lined with paintings by Grigorescu. The house features books from his personal library, Oriental objects that he collected and a large 18th-century French tapestry.

The house is listed as a historic monument by Romania's Ministry of Culture and Religious Affairs, as is the 1957 bust of the artist.

== Notes ==
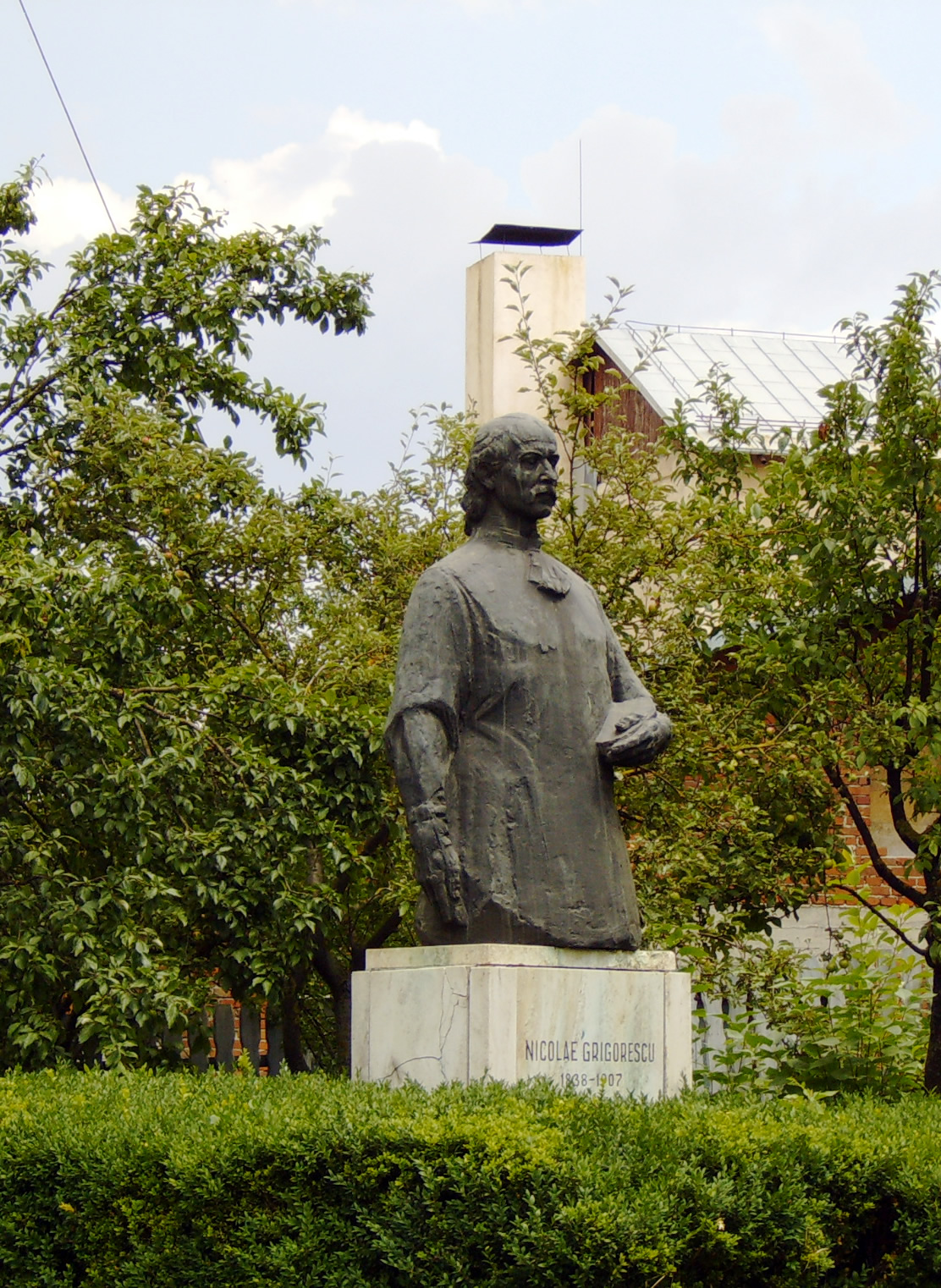
Statue of Grigorescu in the museum's courtyard
