= Potlogi =

- Commune
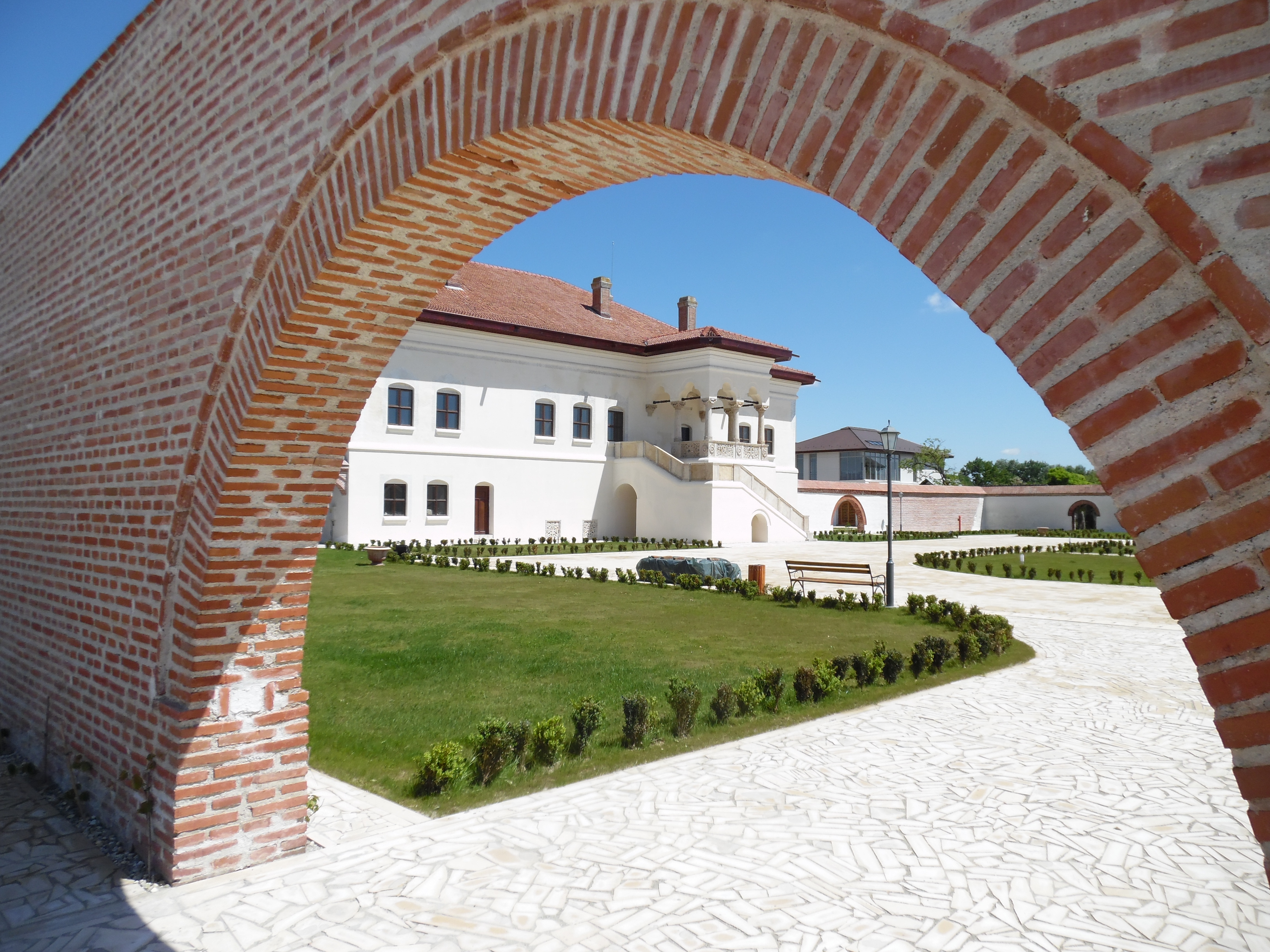
- Potlogi Castle

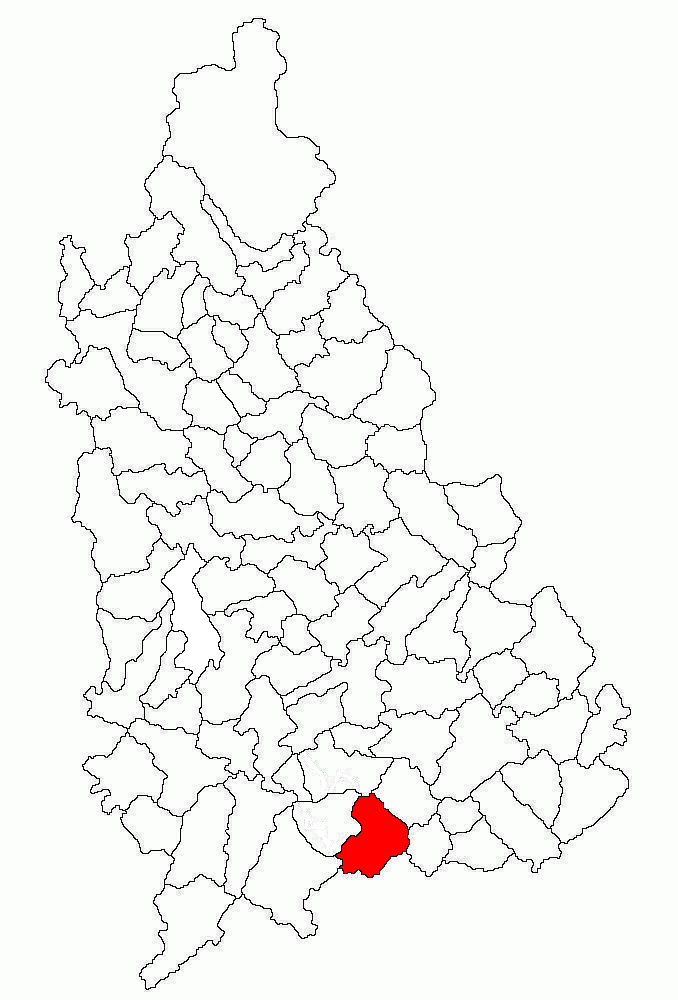
- Location in Dâmbovița County

- Location in Romania
- Coordinates: 44°33′N 25°35′E
- Country: Romania
- County: Dâmbovița

Government
  - Mayor (2024–2028): Viorel Drăghici (PSD)
- Area: 51.99 km^{2} (20.07 sq mi)
- Elevation: 134 m (440 ft)
- Population (2021-12-01): 8,739
  - Density: 168.1/km^{2} (435.4/sq mi)
- Time zone: UTC+02:00 (EET)
  - Summer (DST): UTC+03:00 (EEST)
- Postal code: 137370
- Area code: +(40) 245
- Vehicle reg.: DB
- Website: primariapotlogi.ro

Potlogi is a commune in Dâmbovița County, Muntenia, Romania with a population of 8,739 people as of 2021. It is composed of five villages: Pitaru, Podu Cristinii, Potlogi, Românești, and Vlăsceni.

The commune lies in the Wallachian Plain, on the banks of the river Sabar. It is located in the southern extremity of Dâmbovița County, 50 km (31 mi) from the county seat, Târgoviște, on the border with Giurgiu County; the capital of Romania, Bucharest, is 57 km (35 mi) to the east.

Historical population
Year	Pop.	±%
2002	8,388	—
2011	8,981	+7.1%
2021	8,739	−2.7%
Source: Census data

== Natives ==
- Nicolae Grigorescu (1838–1907), one of the founders of modern Romanian painting.

== Potlogi Castle ==
Potlogi castle was built by Constantin Brâncoveanu in 1698 for his eldest son and presumed heir to the country throne, Constantin II. It is one of the most precious monuments of medieval Romanian civil architecture, built in Brâncovenesc style. It has a cellar, ground floor and first floor. On the four sides there were four stairs, of which only two are preserved today, which facilitated access from the palace to the courtyard and gardens. On the ground floor there is a cellar, half buried. It is symmetrically framed by service rooms to the east and west, as well as the northern lodge on the ground floor. The cellar it is vaulted and supported by a central pillar. Above this pillar there was a vaulted hiding place, which connected with the treasure room, located upstairs, but also with the outside, through a vaulted corridor, which is still intact today. The upstairs rooms were lit by large, arched window at the top. The interior walls, like the exterior ones, were decorated with stucco, with decorative influences belonging to both the style of the late Italian Renaissance and the Oriental style.
