= Câmpina =

- Municipality
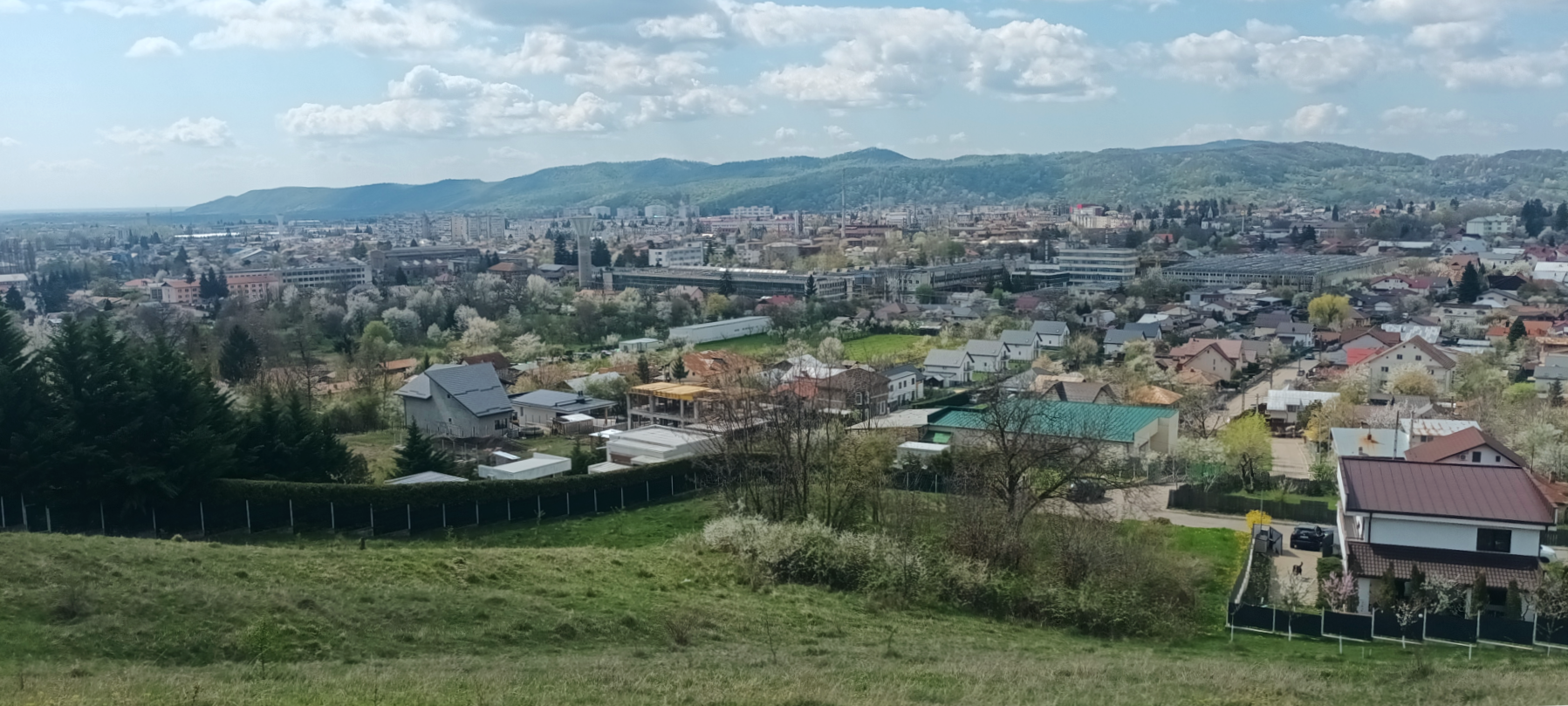
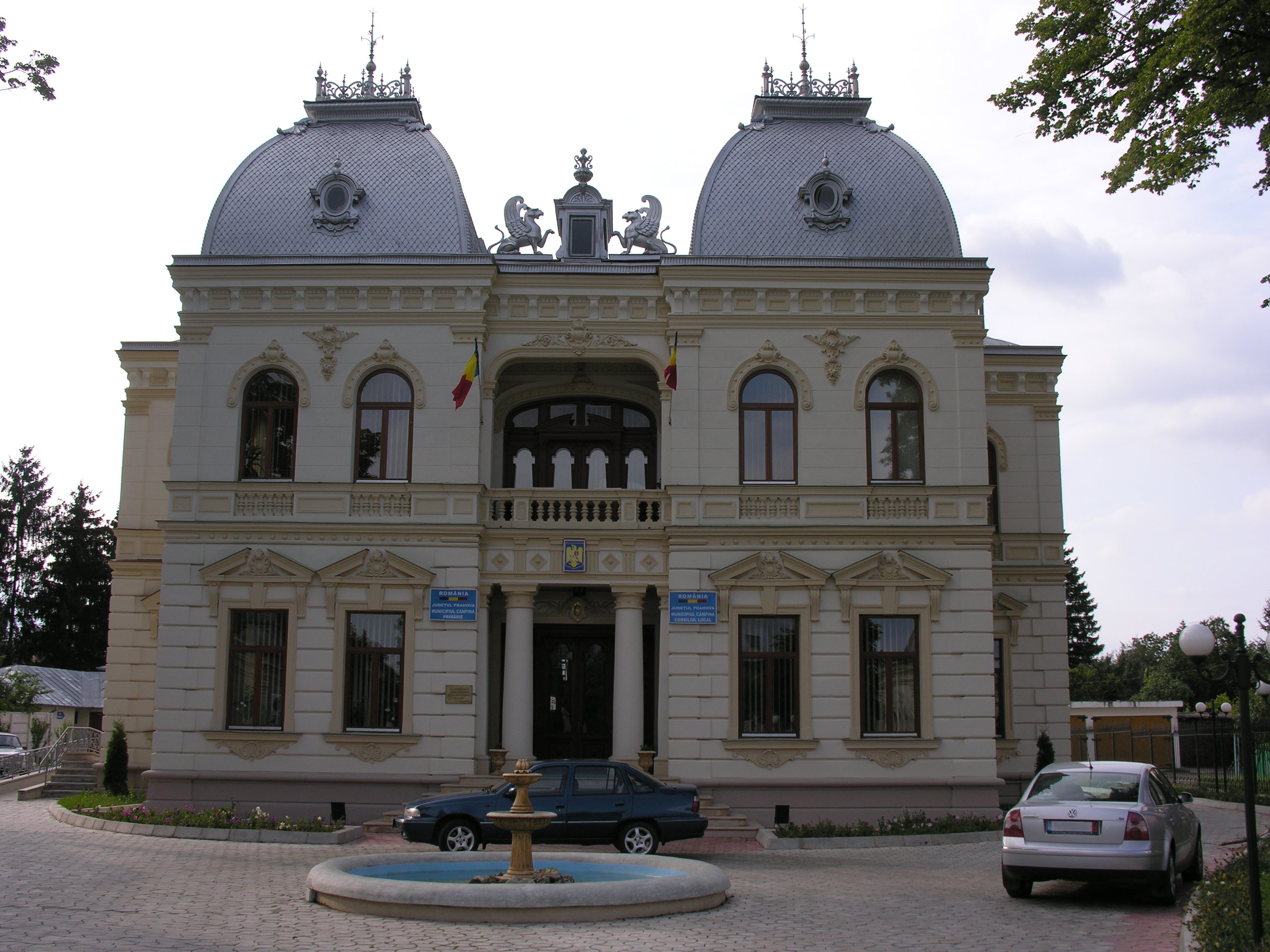
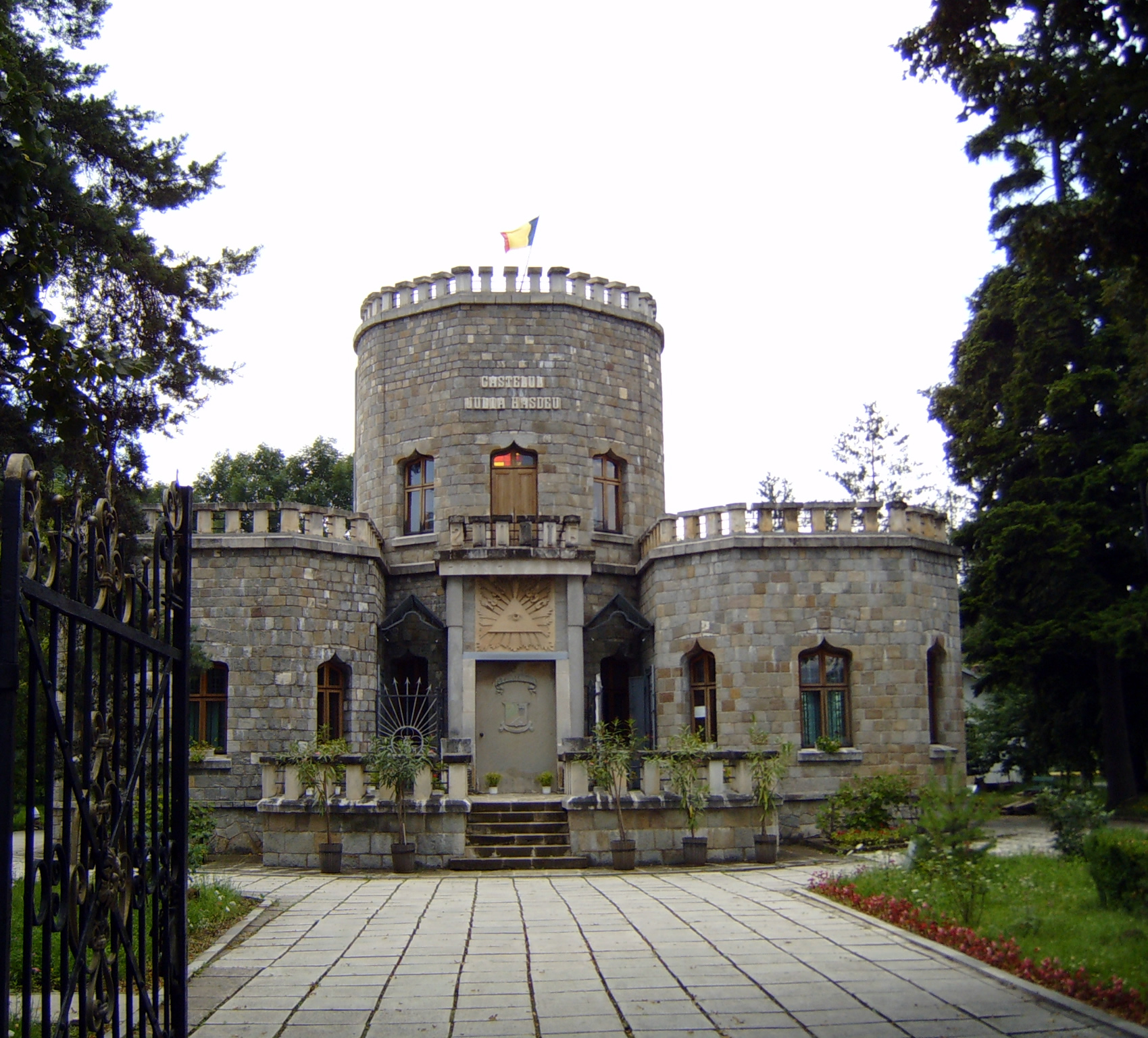
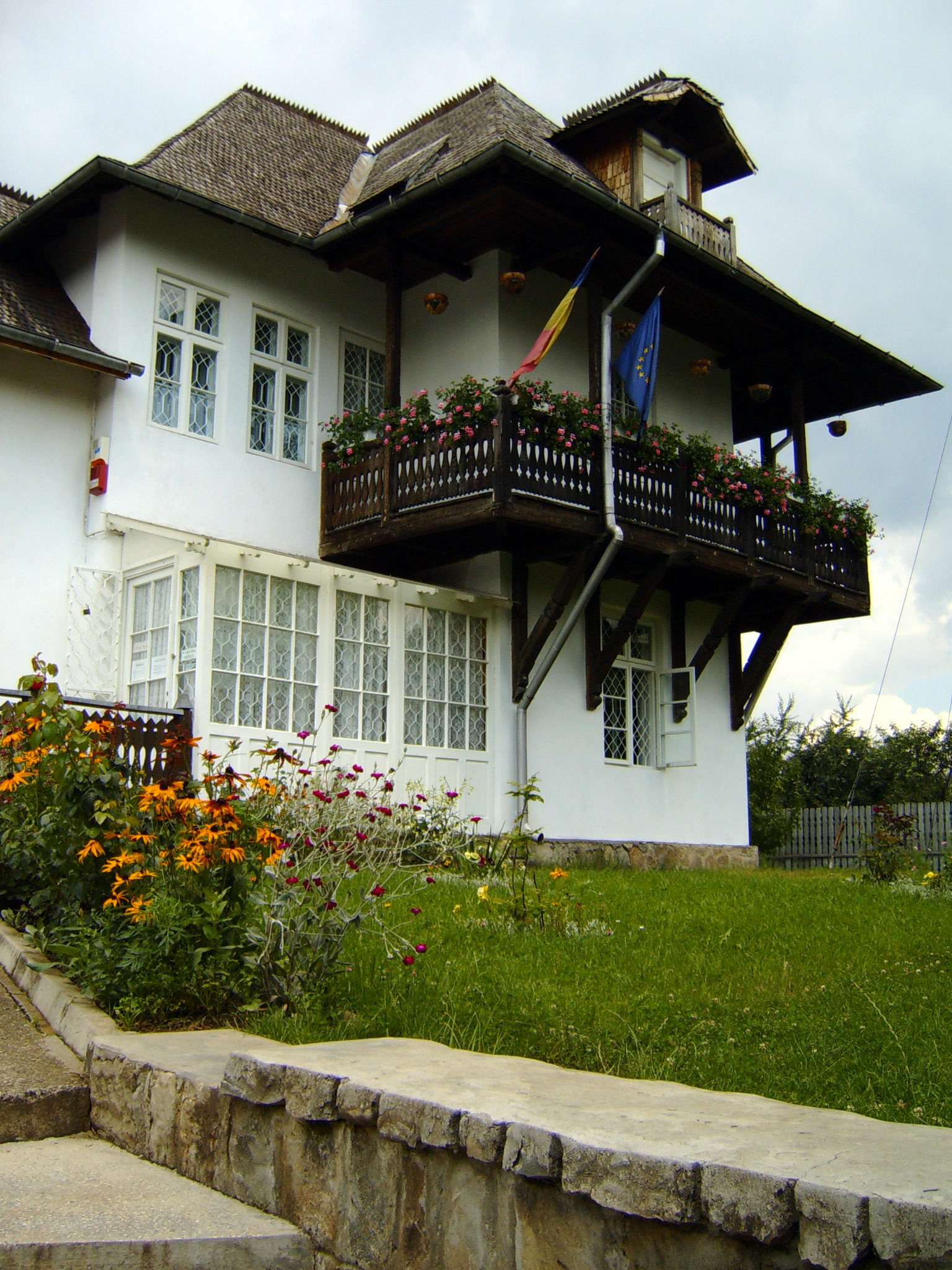
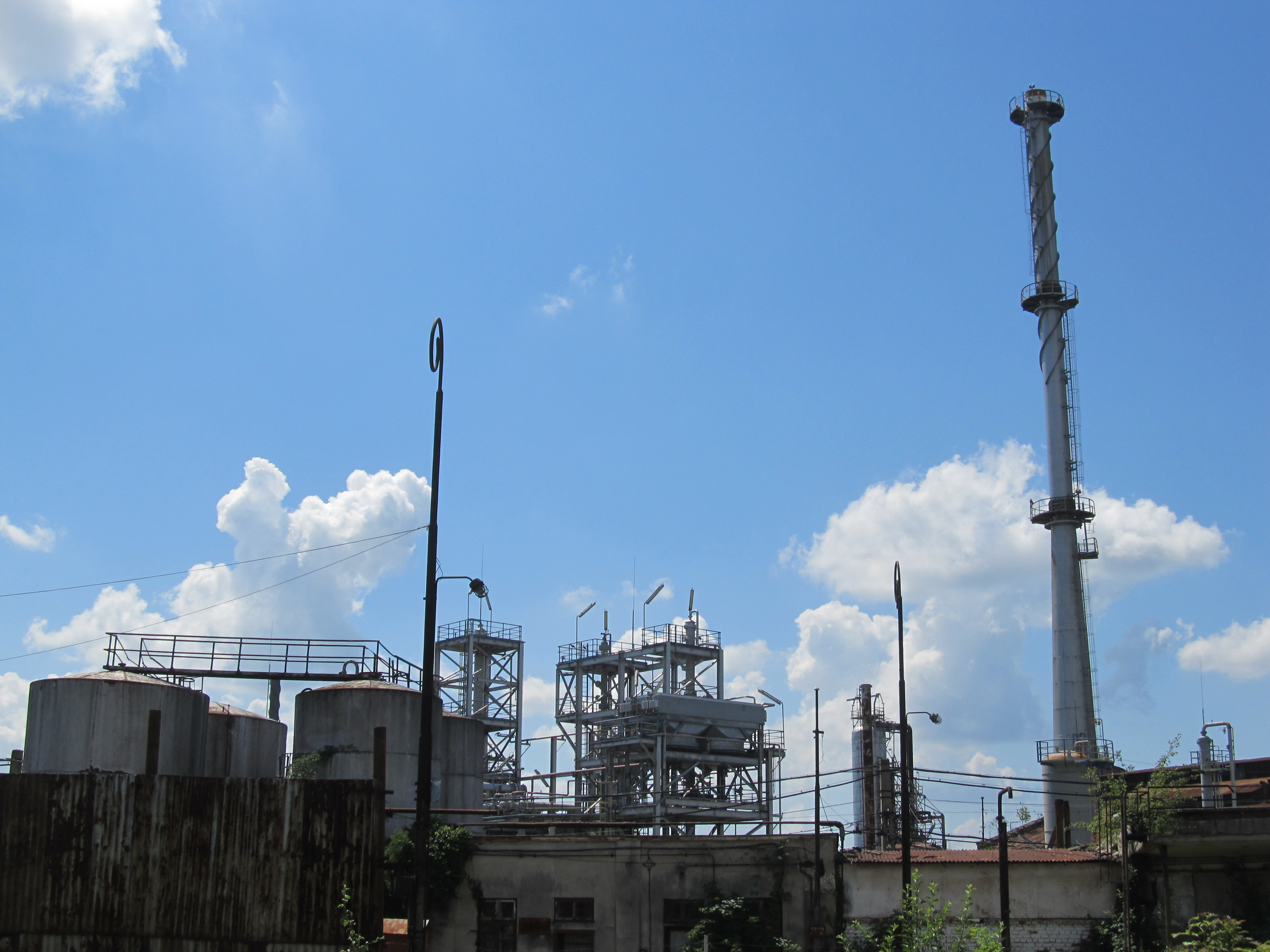
- View from the Old Observatory Câmpina City Hall Iulia Hasdeu Castle Nicolae Grigorescu Museum Steaua Română refinery

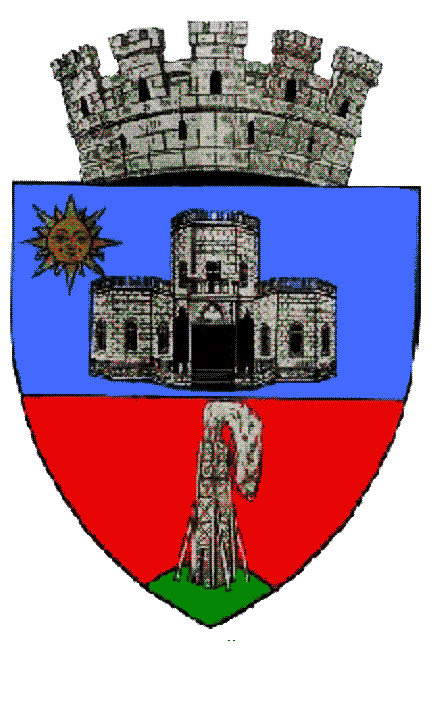
- Coat of arms

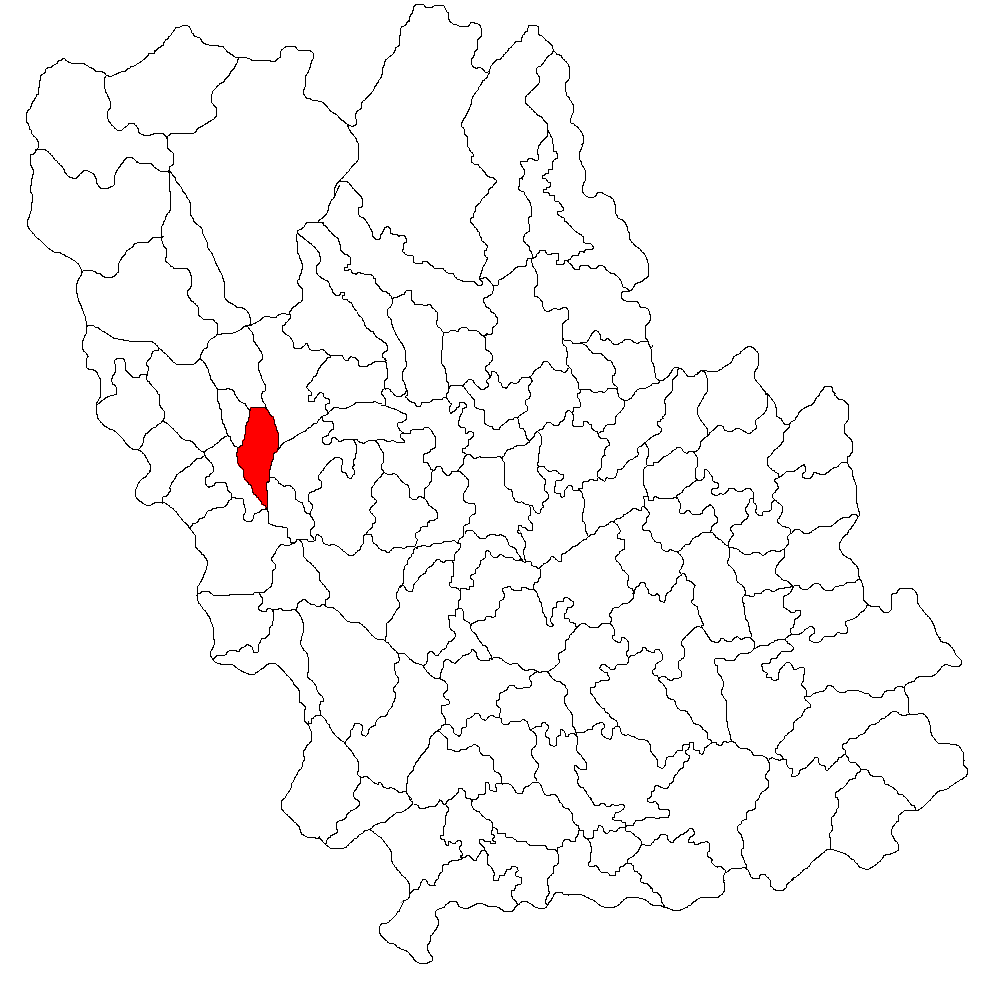
- Location in Prahova County

- Location in Romania
- Coordinates: 45°07′48″N 25°44′24″E
- Country: Romania
- County: Prahova

Government
  - Mayor (2024–2028): Irina-Mihaela Nistor (PSD)
- Area: 24.23 km^{2} (9.36 sq mi)
- Elevation: 426 m (1,398 ft)
- Population (2021-12-01): 28,993
  - Density: 1,197/km^{2} (3,099/sq mi)
- Time zone: UTC+02:00 (EET)
  - Summer (DST): UTC+03:00 (EEST)
- Postal code: 105600
- Area code: (+40) 0244
- Vehicle reg.: PH
- Website: www.primariacampina.ro

Câmpina (Romanian pronunciation: [ˈkɨmpina]) is a city in Prahova County, Romania, north of the county seat Ploiești, located on the main route between Wallachia and Transylvania. Its existence is first attested in a document of 1503. It is situated in the historical region of Muntenia.

== Geography ==
The city is located in the western part of Prahova County, 34 km (21 mi) northwest of the county seat, Ploiești. It is situated in a hilly region, at the southern end of the Prahova Valley, on the banks of the river Prahova, in between the rivers Câmpea and Doftana.

Câmpina is crossed by national road DN1, which links Bucharest, 100 km (62 mi) to the south, with the northwestern part of the country. The Câmpina railway station (opened in 1879) serves the CFR Main Line 300, which runs parallel to DN1, on the right bank of the Prahova.

== History ==
Formerly a customs point on the trade route between Transylvania and Wallachia, the town developed at the end of the 19th century and the beginning of the 20th century as an oil extraction and processing center. Between 1897 and 1898, Câmpina was the site of the largest oil refinery in Europe.

== Notable residents ==
- Alexandrina Alessandrescu (1857–1919), actress
- Dimitrie Bolintineanu (1819–1872), poet and politician; documented the local landscape in his 1862 novel Elena
- George Coșbuc (1866–1918), poet and translator; resident and author of "Din țara Basarabilor" (1901) in Câmpina
- Sandrino Gavriloaia (1964–2025), journalist
- Bogdan Petriceicu Hasdeu (1838–1907), philologist and writer
- Constantin Istrati (1850–1918), chemist, physician, and President of the Romanian Academy; developer of the local spa resort.
- Eugen Jebeleanu (1911–1991), poet
- Nicolae Grigorescu (1838–1907), painter
- Henrik Kacser (1918–1995), biochemist and geneticist was born in Câmpina
- Alexandru Vlahuță (1858–1919), writer and close associate of Nicolae Grigorescu

== Climate ==
Câmpina has a humid continental climate (Cfb in the Köppen climate classification).

Climate data for Câmpina (elevation 461m, 2014–2026 normals, extremes 1980–present)
Month	Jan	Feb	Mar	Apr	May	Jun	Jul	Aug	Sep	Oct	Nov	Dec	Year
Record high °C (°F)	20.8 (69.4)	22.9 (73.2)	26.6 (79.9)	29.0 (84.2)	31.4 (88.5)	34.8 (94.6)	37.3 (99.1)	38.1 (100.6)	37.8 (100.0)	30.5 (86.9)	26.0 (78.8)	23.4 (74.1)	38.1 (100.6)
Mean daily maximum °C (°F)	5.6 (42.1)	7.6 (45.7)	11.8 (53.2)	16.5 (61.7)	20.8 (69.4)	26.1 (79.0)	28.0 (82.4)	28.7 (83.7)	23.6 (74.5)	17.0 (62.6)	10.8 (51.4)	7.3 (45.1)	17.0 (62.6)
Daily mean °C (°F)	0.7 (33.3)	2.4 (36.3)	6.0 (42.8)	10.2 (50.4)	14.6 (58.3)	19.7 (67.5)	21.4 (70.5)	21.6 (70.9)	17.1 (62.8)	11.1 (52.0)	6.2 (43.2)	2.8 (37.0)	11.1 (52.1)
Mean daily minimum °C (°F)	−4.2 (24.4)	−2.7 (27.1)	0.3 (32.5)	3.8 (38.8)	8.5 (47.3)	13.3 (55.9)	14.8 (58.6)	14.6 (58.3)	10.5 (50.9)	5.2 (41.4)	1.6 (34.9)	−1.7 (28.9)	5.3 (41.6)
Record low °C (°F)	−25.1 (−13.2)	−21.1 (−6.0)	−18.0 (−0.4)	−7.1 (19.2)	−1.4 (29.5)	3.0 (37.4)	6.6 (43.9)	6.5 (43.7)	−1.4 (29.5)	−6.0 (21.2)	−15.2 (4.6)	−18.0 (−0.4)	−25.1 (−13.2)
Average precipitation mm (inches)	41.6 (1.64)	27.5 (1.08)	40.9 (1.61)	48.5 (1.91)	102.8 (4.05)	121.0 (4.76)	109.7 (4.32)	52.1 (2.05)	57.7 (2.27)	64.7 (2.55)	63.7 (2.51)	47.3 (1.86)	777.5 (30.61)
Average precipitation days (≥ 1.0 mm)	6.3	5.2	5.9	7.7	11.8	11.5	9.9	5.8	5.4	6.8	7.8	5.9	90
Average snowy days	4.9	4.5	2.2	0.5	0	0	0	0	0	0.4	1.3	2.8	16.6
Source: Meteomanz, Infoclimat, ANM

== Tourist attractions ==
- Nicolae Grigorescu Memorial Museum
- Iulia Hasdeu Castle
- Biserica de la Han (de la brazi) (The Inn Church)
- Geo Bogza Cultural Center
- Casa Tineretului (The House of the Youth)
- The House with Griffons (the actual city-hall), the first building with electric gates in Romania
- The Hernea Chapel
- The Saint Nicholas Parish
- Fântâna cu Cireși (on the Muscel hill)
- Muscel, Ciobu, and Pițigaia hills
- Prahova and Doftana riverbanks
- Near Paltinu Dam

== Education ==
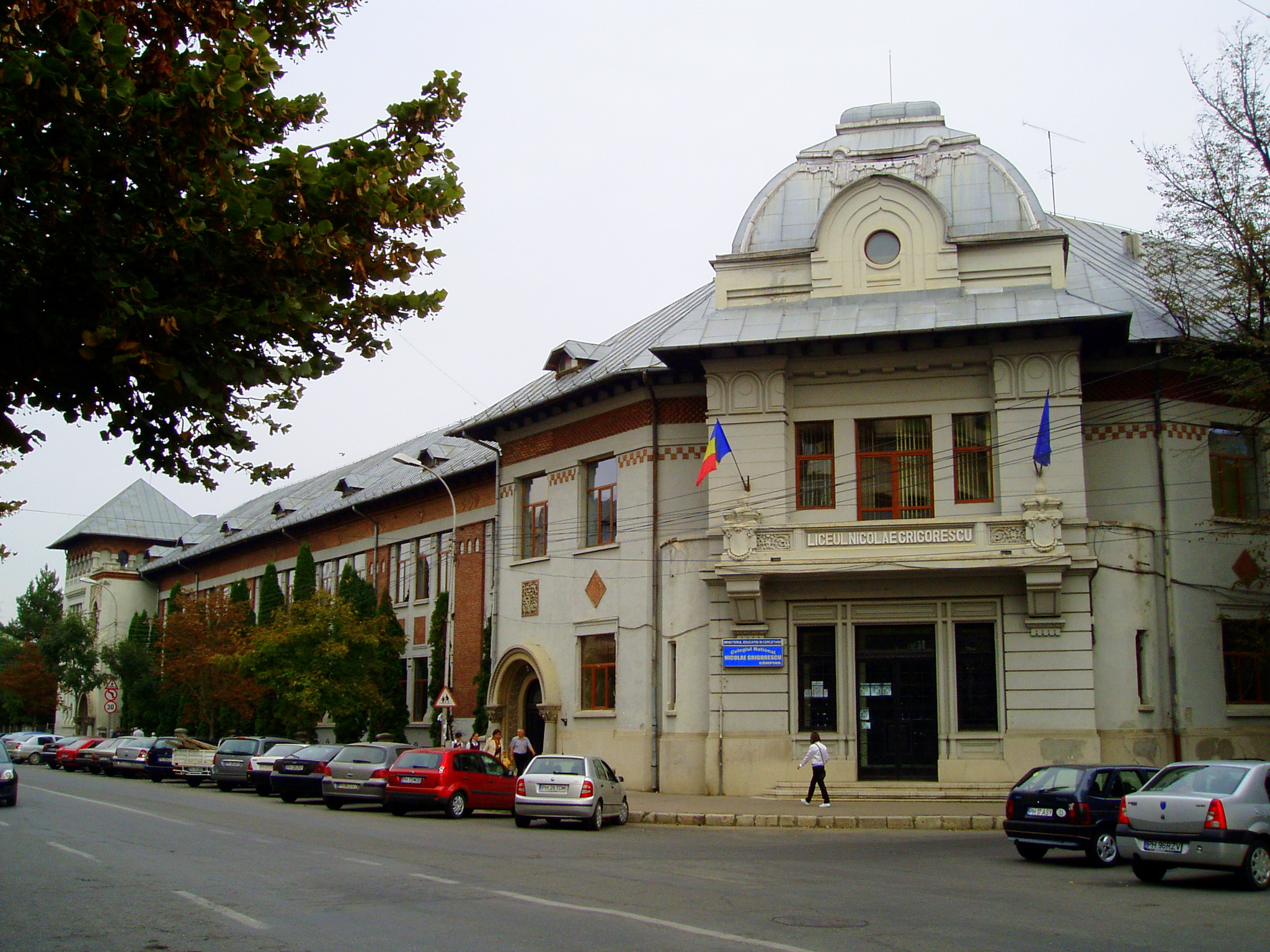
Nicolae Grigorescu National College

There are 5 high schools in Câmpina:

- Nicolae Grigorescu National College
- Constantin Istrati Technical High School
- Forestier Technical College
- Energetic Technologic High School
- Technologic-Mechanic High School

There is also a Police Agents School in Câmpina (Școala de Agenți de Poliție "Vasile Lascăr"), one of the two police agent schools in the country. There are also two sanitary schools, Dr. Dinu Sanitary School and the Louis Pasteur Nursing and Pharma School.

== Sport ==
The city is home to the 3rd-division football club FC Unirea Câmpina and to 4th-division football club FCM Câmpina, founded in 1936.

== Population ==
Historical population
Year	Pop.	±%
1897	3,774	—
1912	8,500	+125.2%
1948	22,800	+168.2%
1977	32,503	+42.6%
1992	41,554	+27.8%
2002	38,758	−6.7%
2011	32,935	−15.0%
2021	28,993	−12.0%
Source: Census data
