= Sandrino Gavriloaia =

Romanian journalist (1964–2025)

Sandrino Gavriloaia (1964 – 18 August 2025) was a Romanian journalist.

== Life and work ==
Gavriloaia was born in Câmpina, and graduated from the University of Bucharest. He began working for TVR in 1995, working as an editor. He has worked on cultural programming including Traveler in the East (2003–2009), The World and Us and The Second Romania.

Gavriloaia died on 18 August 2025, at the age of 61.
