= George Oprescu =

Romanian historian, art critic and collector (1881–1969)

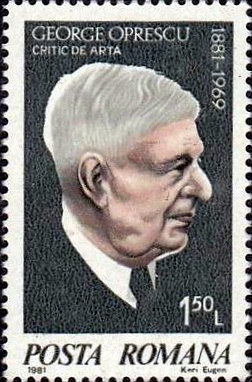
- 1981 postage stamp commemorating the centenary of Oprescu's birth
- Born: November 27, 1881; Câmpulung, Kingdom of Romania
- Died: August 13, 1969 (aged 87); Bucharest, Socialist Republic of Romania

Academic background
- Education: University of Bucharest

Academic work
- Discipline: History

George Oprescu (27 November 1881 – 13 August 1969) was a Romanian historian, art critic and collector. Born into a poor family, he developed a taste for the fine arts early in life, as well as for the French language, which he taught into his forties. Subsequently, working for the League of Nations, he turned his attention to art history, becoming a professor in the field at the University of Bucharest in 1931. He was also a museum curator and magazine editor, and in 1949 established the Institute of Art History, which he led for two decades until his death. His substantial private collection is now in the hands of various institutions, while his written body of work helped lay the foundation for art history to become a serious discipline in his country.

== Biography ==
=== Education and schoolteaching ===
Born in Câmpulung, he was raised in a poor household and was marked by his mother's early death. Receiving support from several individuals and earning top marks during primary school, he went to the national capital Bucharest to attend Matei Basarab High School, living with the family of his classmate Constantin Ionescu-Mihăești. He developed an artistic sensibility in these surroundings, rich with objets d'art, paintings, books and valuable furniture. Additionally, he cultivated a love of the French language, which permitted him to read numerous classic works in the original. His favorite teachers were the journalist and historian Gheorghe Ionescu-Gion, who taught history and French; and the folklorist, literary historian and journalist G. Dem. Teodorescu (Romanian language and literature). In the summer of 1900, together with other scholarship boys, he took a study trip to Greece under the supervision of Grigore Tocilescu. That autumn, following Ionnescu-Gion's proposal, he was named a teacher at Matei Basarab, which allowed him to finance his studies at the Literature and Philosophy Faculty of the University of Bucharest. It was during the following years that he deepened his appreciation for art, guided by Ioan Cantacuzino, a devoted collector of engravings.

Upon graduation in 1905, he became a French language and literature teacher in Giurgiu. In 1907, he transferred to Traian High School in Turnu Severin, remaining there until 1920, including a stint as principal. Among his pupils was the future literary critic Șerban Cioculescu, who recalled him as a stern disciplinarian. During summer holidays, alone or with students and teachers, he would travel to art museums in Austria, Germany, Italy and France. He declared his support for the 1907 Romanian Peasants' Revolt, and in January 1917, during World War I, after he had condemned the German occupation authorities, he was among sixty intellectuals and bureaucrats who were arrested in Turnu Severin. Afterwards, Oprescu was sent to Bulgaria, where he was interned in a camp before being freed several months later. Subsequently, he became an associate professor at the University of Cluj, which was located in a region that had come under Romanian jurisdiction with the union of Transylvania with Romania. At Cluj, he continued to teach French language and literature, also establishing and leading an art history seminar. While attending specialized courses in France, he became close friends with Henri Focillon, whose biography he later wrote, and whose letters to Oprescu were published posthumously.

=== Professorate and Art History Institute ===
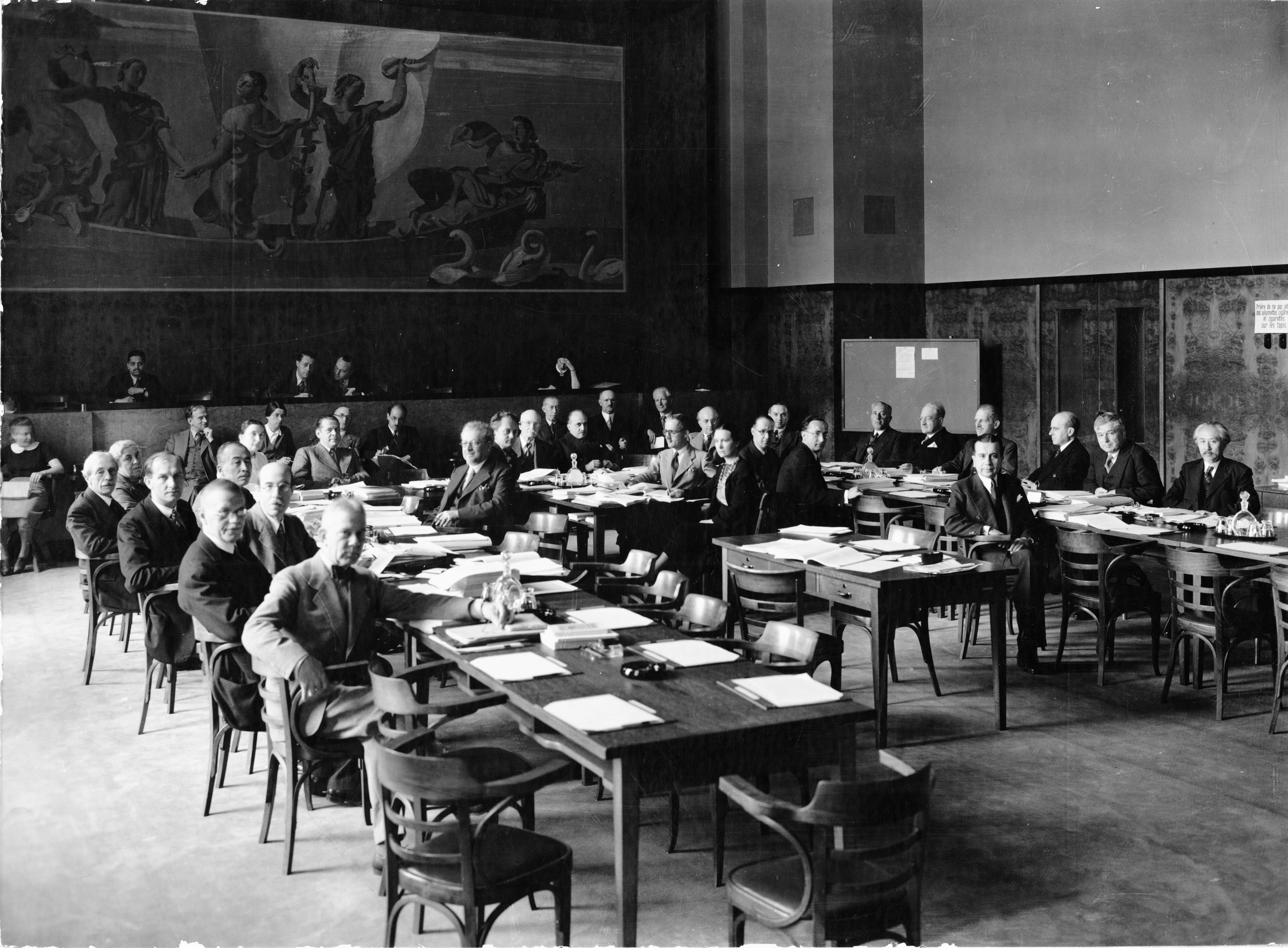
Oprescu (second from right) at the 1939 plenary session of the ICIC

From 1923 to 1930, Oprescu served as secretary of the League of Nations' International Committee on Intellectual Cooperation (ICIC) in Geneva; and then of the Committee on Literature and Art until 1939, when he moved back to Romania. In 1931, Nicolae Iorga invited him to join the University of Bucharest's faculty, and he became chairman of art history there. The appointment marked a turning point in art history's development as a discipline in Romania. His teaching, which reflected his research activities, laid a basis for future work in multiple topics. Aside from his teaching of Western art history, he established a course on modern Romanian art, although he steered somewhat clear of the 1920s avant-garde and modernist theory. From 1932 to 1942, he headed the Toma Stelian Museum, donating to it many of the artworks he had purchased both at home and abroad; the museum's collection later passed to the National Museum of Art of Romania.

Together with Ion D. Ștefănescu, he established and became co-editor of the review Analecta in 1942. Although only four issues were published from 1943 to 1947, it signaled a new direction toward subjects in European art and art theory in addition to modern and medieval Romanian art, as well as a less nationalist tone than that used by previous art historians. In 1948, after the establishment of a Communist regime, he became an honorary member of the Romanian Academy. From 1949 until his death in 1969, he headed the academy's Institute of Art History, which he founded and which today bears his name. Although a pragmatic collaborator with the regime, he nevertheless hired marginalized or persecuted figures such as Ion Frunzetti, Alexandru Paleologu, Remus Niculescu, Emil Lăzărescu, P. H. Stahl and Pavel Chihaia. In 1961, he became one of a select group of individuals to have received the Communist state's second-highest honor, the Order of the Star of the Romanian People's Republic, first class. During his time at the institute, he promoted scientific research, archival and field work, and its endowment with books and documents that would later develop into a library. He also founded two journals, Studii și Cercetări de Istoria Artei and Revue Roumaine d'Histoire de l'Art.

=== Work and legacy ===
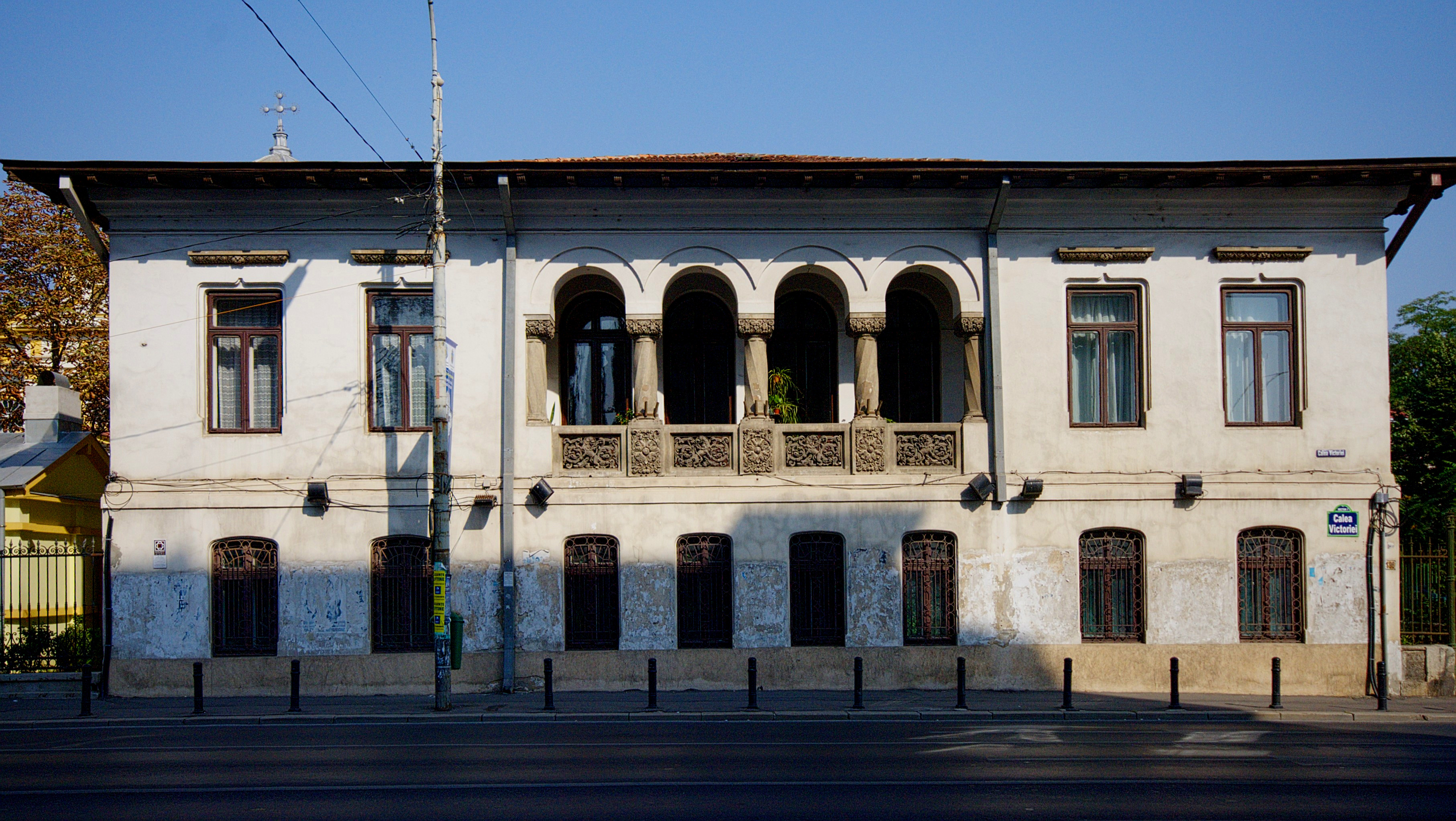
The Oprescu-founded Institute of Art History, located on Bucharest's Calea Victoriei

In 1962, he donated a collection of 1400 drawings and 6000 engravings to the academy. His private collection, held in his home in the Cotroceni neighborhood, was on display there until 1977, when his paintings, drawings, decorative pieces and folk art were given to the Museum of Art Collections, while his books went to the institute. He also donated his Câmpulung residence to the institute, and the building now serves to house visiting researchers. Although he began research into art history relatively late in life, in the early 1920s, his energy and longevity ensured a considerable output. Interested in a systematic approach to the subject, he also sought recognition for Romanian art abroad, publishing in France, Sweden, Switzerland, Germany and the United Kingdom, as well as commissioning translations for many of the works he published in Romanian.

At first focused on peasant art and on painters including Gheorghe Petrașcu and Ion Andreescu, in 1937 he published Pictura românească în secolul al XIX-lea ("Romanian Painting in the 19th Century"), the first integral account of the topic. Later, he wrote on subjects including drawing, painting, modern sculpture and European art history. He published numerous studies and articles in domestic and foreign art history magazines, with the following popular publications also hosting his work: Contemporanul (1951–1969), Flacăra (1954–1969), Luceafărul (1956–1966), Ramuri (1964–1969), Revista Fundațiilor Regale (1944–1946), La Roumanie d'aujourd'hui (1963–1966), La Roumanie nouvelle (1954–1958), Scînteia (1954–1969), Scînteia Tineretului (1963–1968), Universul (1932–1947) and Viața Românească (1937–1940).

Oprescu was homosexual. In early 1959, he was summoned by police investigators looking into homosexual activity by a number of individuals, among them Oprescu's employee, the musicologist Mihai Rădulescu and the latter's lover, the documentary filmmaker Petre Sirin. According to Sirin's account, an irritated Oprescu entered the office announcing, "I am the academician George Oprescu!", to which the investigator answered menacingly, "Get out, you old whore! And come in only when I call you!" His face pale, Oprescu promptly exited.
