= Remus Niculescu =

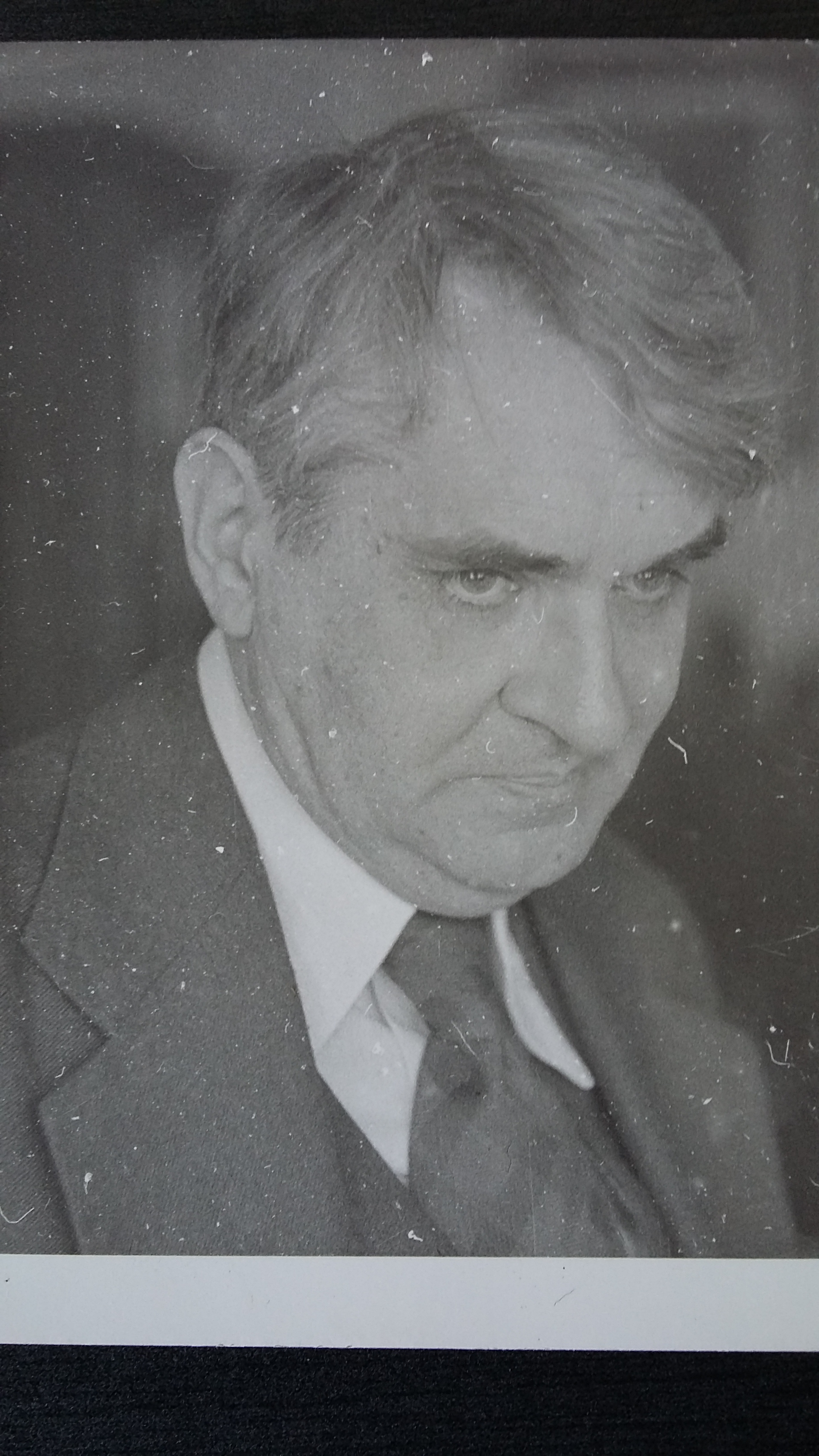
Remus Niculescu

Remus Niculescu (1927–2005) was a Romanian art historian. Due to his closeness to philosopher Constantin Noica, the Communist regime staged a show trial against him, but he was later rehabilitated.
