= Ion Theodorescu-Sion =

Romanian painter and draftsman

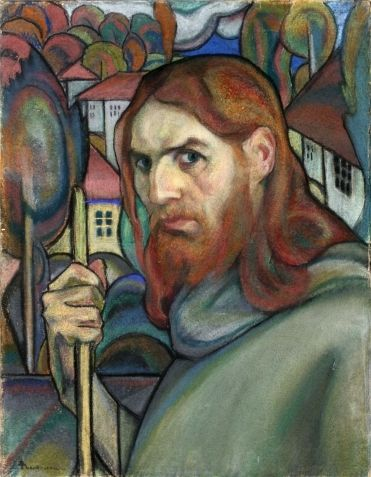
- Self-portrait (pastel, 1925)
- Born: January 2, 1882; Ianca, Brăila County, Kingdom of Romania
- Died: March 31, 1939 (aged 57); Bucharest, Kingdom of Romania
- Education: National School of Fine Arts; École nationale supérieure des Beaux-Arts
- Known for: Oil painting, mural, pastel, illustration, cartoon
- Movement: Academic art, Impressionism, Realism, Post-Impressionism, Divisionism, Symbolism, Art Nouveau, Primitivism, Synthetism, Fauvism, Cubism, Byzantine revival, Poporanism, Tinerimea Artistică, Gândirea
- Awards: Bucharest Salon 2nd Prize (1909); Order of the Crown (1923, 1926); Bene Merenti medal (1923)

Ion Theodorescu-Sion (Romanian pronunciation: [iˈon te.odoˈresku siˈon]; also known as Ioan Theodorescu-Sion or Teodorescu-Sion; January 2, 1882 – March 31, 1939) was a Romanian painter and draftsman, known for his contributions to modern art and especially for his traditionalist, primitivist, handicraft-inspired and Christian painting. Trained in academic art, initially an Impressionist, he dabbled in various modern styles in the years before World War I. Theodorescu-Sion's palette was interchangeably post-Impressionist, Divisionist, Realist, Symbolist, Synthetist, Fauve or Cubist, but his creation had one major ideological focus: depicting peasant life in its natural setting. In time, Sion contributed to the generational goal of creating a specifically Romanian modern art, located at the intersection of folk tradition, primitivist tendencies borrowed from the West, and 20th-century agrarian politics.

Initially scandalized by Theodorescu-Sion's experiments, public opinion accepted his tamer style of the mid to late 1910s. Sion was commissioned as a war artist, after which his standing increased. His paintings alternated the monumental depictions of harsh environments, and their inhabitants, with luminous Balcic seascapes and nostalgic records of suburban life. Their search for visual concreteness was a standard for the Anti-Impressionist emancipation of the Romanian artistic scene in the interwar period.

By the mid-1920s, Sion's style became a visual component of the Neo-Traditionalist, "Romanianist" and neo-Byzantine current formed around Gândirea literary magazine. In the years before his death, the emergent avant-garde was voicing criticism of his new stylistic and ideological choices. Sion's oscillation between modernity and parochialism, his flirtation with authoritarian politics, and the eventual decline of his work endure as topics of controversy.

== Biography ==
=== Background and early life ===
The son of a Romanian Railways brakeman and the peasant-woman Ioana Ursu, Theodorescu-Sion was born in Ianca, Brăila County, and baptized into the Romanian Orthodox Church. On both sides, his family had origins in Transylvania's Apuseni Mountains and the Breadfield, regions at the time still part of Austria-Hungary; by popular account, some were Moți, that is to say ethnic Romanian herders with a distinctly rustic lifestyle. Ion spent his early childhood on the Bărăgan Plain, but grew up into a passionate hiker of the Carpathian Mountains.

In 1894, having attended primary and secondary school in the Danube port of Brăila, the boy left for Bucharest to study at the National School of Fine Arts, and graduated in 1897. From 1904 to 1907, with a Ministry of War scholarship to his name, he traveled to France. Sion consequently enlisted at the École nationale supérieure des Beaux-Arts, studying under academic masters Jean-Paul Laurens and Luc-Olivier Merson. He was a rebellious student, shaped by socialist ideas, and squandered his scholarship money.

Sion was rendered enthusiastic by news of the Revolution in Russia, and was thrown out by his conservative patrons. He burned all his belongings except for a copy of Les Fleurs du mal, and traveled to French Algeria, where he probably intended to apply for the Foreign Legion. He later returned to Romania, but frequently traveled out of Romania on study trips. These took him to the Low Countries, England and Italy. He was a staff cartoonist (caricaturist) for various Romanian satirical papers, including Zavera ("The Trouble"), Nea Ghiță ("Uncle Ghiță") and George Ranetti's Furnica.

From his French period, Theodorescu-Sion brought home the echoes of Impressionism, and the more modern influences of Paul Cézanne, the post-Impressionist, and André Derain, the Fauve, together with the optical theories of Divisionism. Between 1908 and 1915, the artist, still heavily indebted to the work of Henri Fantin-Latour, was focused on creating Symbolist compositions with trees. As he took more risks in his experimentation, he began looking to Cubist Georges Braque for a new way of arranging still lifes. In tandem with such contributions were Realistic works suggesting the influence of Romania's Camil Ressu.

=== Symbolist movement and Balcic colony ===
Sion was received into the innovative and eclectic society [[Tinerimea Artistică|Tinerimea Artistică]], as one of its Symbolist recruits, in 1909, and shortly after exhibited his religious-themed portrait Lux in tenebris lucet (John 1:5). The same year, he sent his works to the Official Bucharest Salon, and shared with others the jury's Second Prize ex aequo. In tandem, he began hiking through the Carpathian and rural regions of Transylvania. His paintings record a growing interest in lives of its peasant inhabitants (and thus in his own peasant roots), with focus on the Romanian-inhabited areas of Apuseni, Breadfield or Mărginimea Sibiului. Culturally, Theodorescu-Sion also affiliated with a new wave of Romanian artists, who used simple forms, bold colors and clear contours to illustrate mystically charged subjects. Alongside Sion, this group has been said to include Cecilia Cuțescu-Storck, Friedrich Storck and Iosif Iser, followed later by Rodica Maniu and Francisc Șirato. Literary historian George Călinescu describes this moment as having generated "calligraphic painting": "shaped by the contours and by the invention of ceremonial attitudes", and "most often stripped down to the drawing."

The primitivists' activity in the visual realm is linked to the emergence of unconventional writers and the more radical manifestations of Romanian Symbolist culture—commentators note their kinship with poet Adrian Maniu (Rodica Maniu's brother) or with the minor Symbolists Alexandru Bogdan-Pitești, N. D. Cocea and Theodor Cornel. Theodorescu-Sion's first moment in the spotlight was in 1910, at the Tinerimea Artistică collective art show, which shocked the public and the academic authors. The group, joined by sculptor Constantin Brâncuși, found itself marginalized inside the exhibit, but received support in the Symbolist press. Building on the conclusions of other researchers, such as Theodor Enescu, literary historian Paul Cernat sees in this movement, called "anti-academic post-impressionism", Romania's first departure from picturesque salon art, as well as a Romanian version of the Armory Show phenomenon.

Sion was still regularly present at later Tinerimea salons. In 1912, he was extremely radical, allowing critics of the day to regard him as the prototype Romanian "Futurist" (an expression of shocking newness, rather than an actual affiliation with the Futurist current). In 1913, his featured paintings included a rendition of the Crucifixion and melancholic depictions of solitary shepherds. A year later, he had a personal exhibit (his first-ever) at the Romanian Atheneum. As noted by journalist Octavian Tăslăuanu, the establishment still viewed his works with embarrassment, and "exiled" them into a lateral hall.

Shortly after the Second Balkan War of 1913, a Romanian administration took over in Southern Dobruja, and the region became of interest to Romanian artists. Balcic (Balchik), once a promising port of export, declined economically, but its vistas and its exotic Muslim inhabitants made it a popular summertime resort and artists' colony. Theodorescu-Sion joined this phenomenon at its earliest stage, and was, with Ressu, Iser, Cuțescu-Storck and others, a "founding member" of the Balcic painters' community. He was also involved on the art scene of Northern Dobruja, commissioned to decorate the Constanța City Hall palace with a series of murals. It was here that he first met art collector and mecena Krikor Zambaccian, who would purchase an exhibit a sizable portion of his later canvasses, including Moara din Balcic ("The Balchik Mill"). Zambaccian remembered Sion as a talented but peculiar and vindictive artist, who posed as artistic mentor but could not stand actual competition.

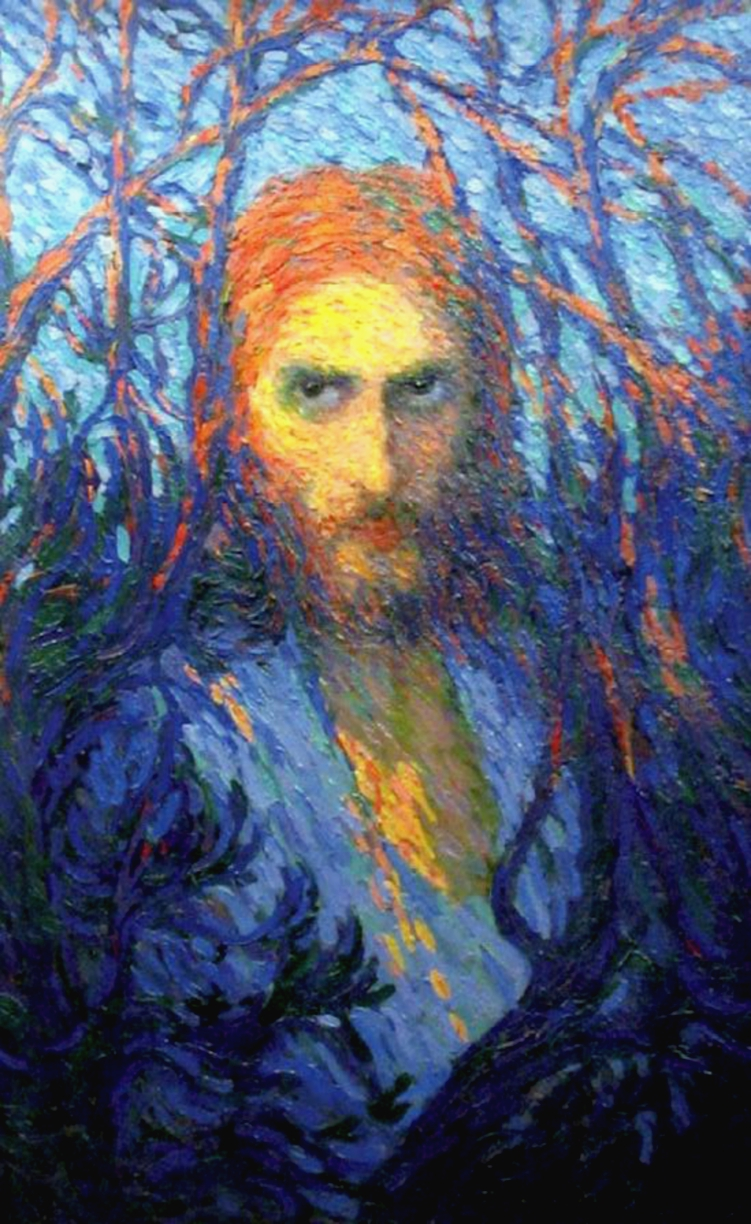
Lux in tenebris lucet (1909)

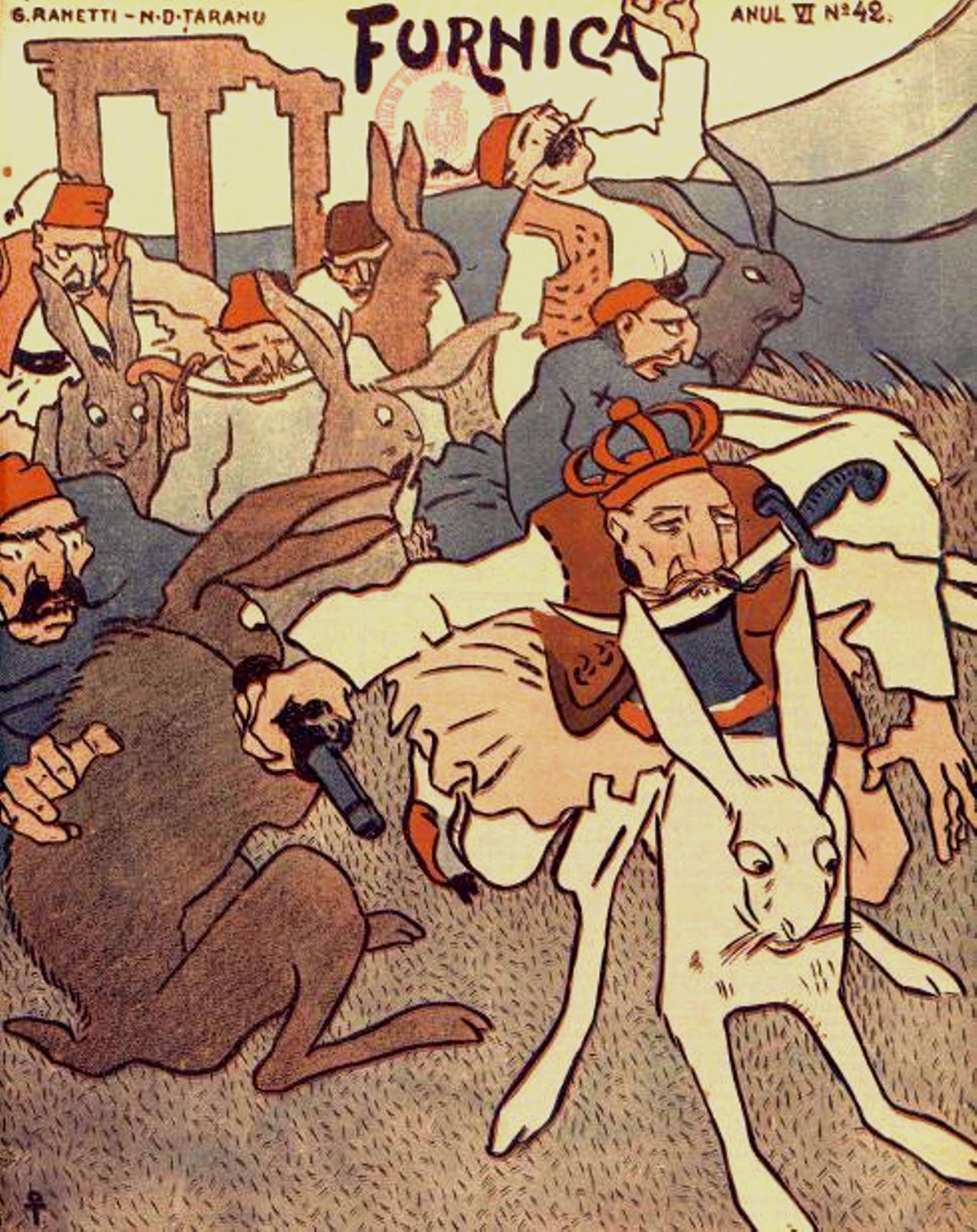
Cover art for Furnica (June 1910)

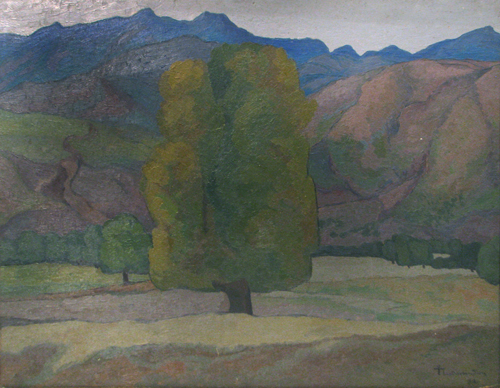
Peisaj ("Landscape", 1912)

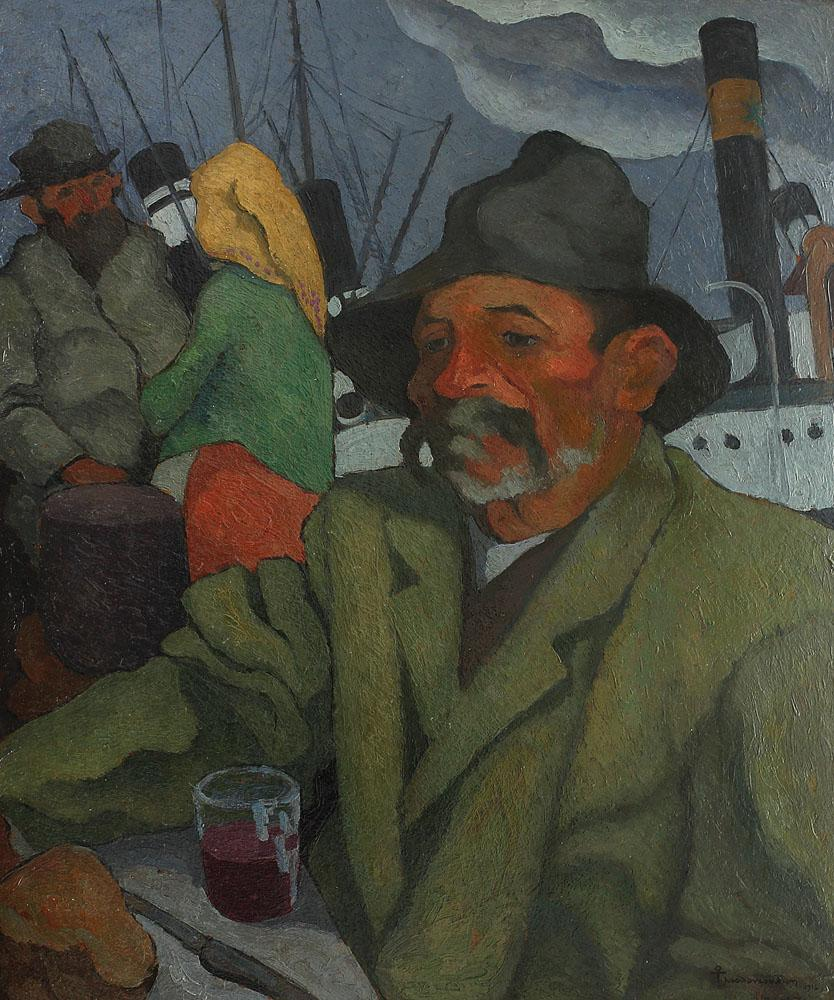
În repaos ("At Rest", 1912)

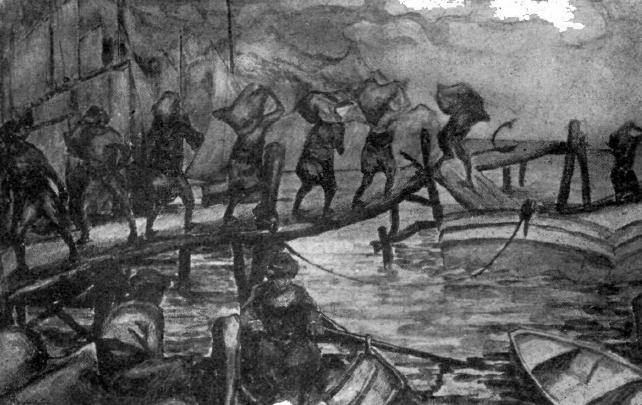
Încărcarea mahonului (Balcic) ("Loading the Barge (Balchik)", 1914)

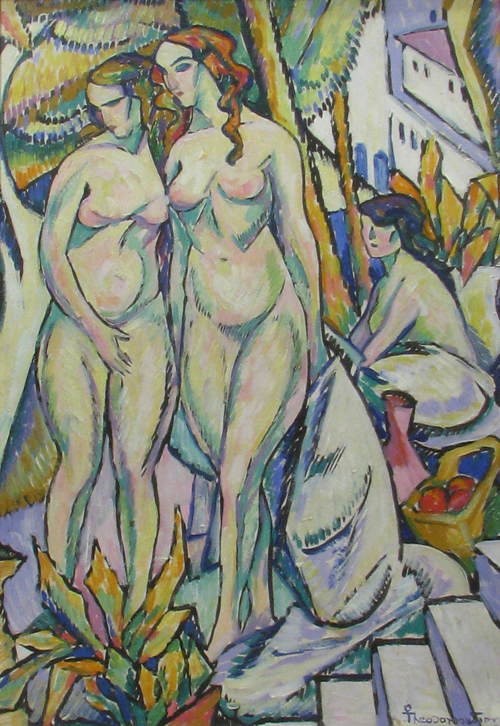
Nuduri în peisaj ("Nudes in a Landscape"), 1914

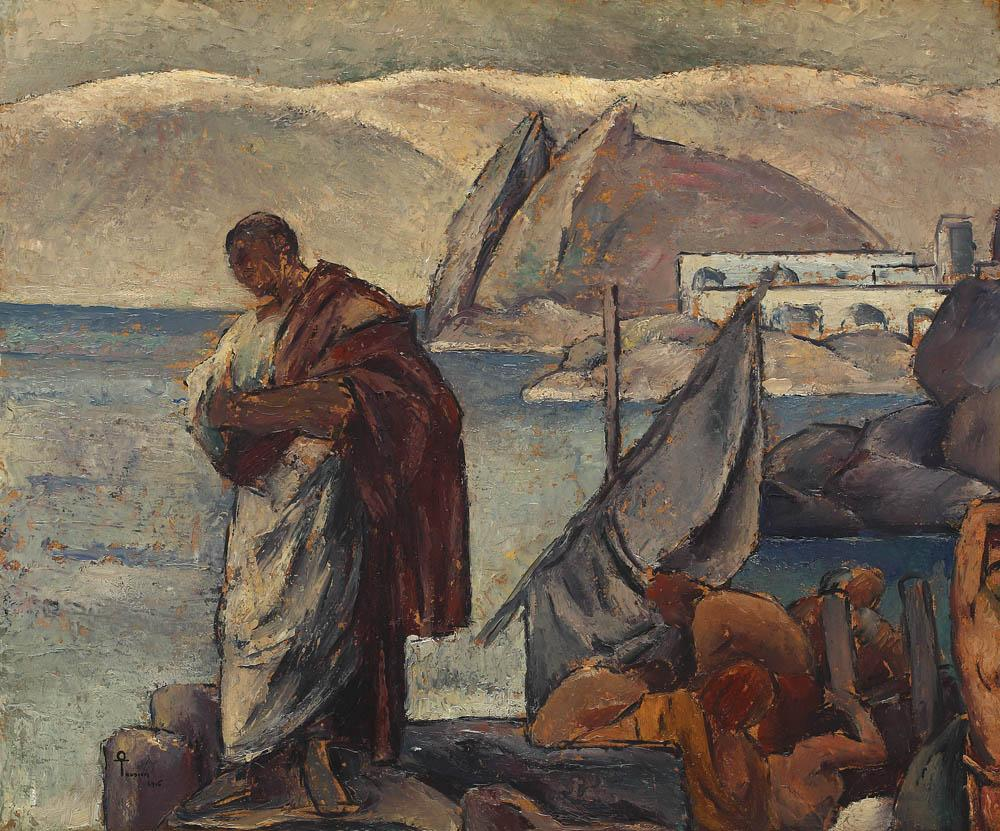
Ovidiu în exil ("Ovid in Exile", 1915)

=== War artist and Arta Română shows ===
Around 1914, Sion had distanced entirely himself from Symbolism and the decorative lines of Art Nouveau, advising his young pupil Lola Schmierer Roth to do the same—they both relied on a proto-Cubist composition into solid shapes, for which the model was Cézanne. Co-opted as a teacher at the National School of Fine Arts, Theodorescu-Sion was also one of the founding members of the Artists' Society, a leading Romanian professional association.

As Romania entered World War I in 1916, Ion Theodorescu-Sion was forced to interrupt his work on the Constanța murals. Once drafted into the Romanian Land Forces, he returned to official and academic art: he was employed by Chief of Staff Dumitru Iliescu to depict the Romanian Armed Forces in action. Sion witnessed (and painted) the subsequent storming of the Romanian front by the Central Powers, and joined the exodus of Romanian soldiers and civil authorities into the eastern region of Moldavia. He was in Iași, the provisional capital, where he began collaborating with other war artists driven away by the defeats. In 1918, Sion joined them as they broke with Tinerimea, creating the new artistic forum Arta Română ("Romanian Art")—Ressu, Nicolae Tonitza, Ștefan Dimitrescu and Oscar Han were among the other main affiliates.

After the Romanian authorities returned to Bucharest, Sion's work was featured in the Franklin Hall salon organized by Minerva Publishers (1919). He still flirted with socialism, and, as noted by journalist Tudor Teodorescu-Braniște, helped out in the 1920 funeral ceremony of Marxist theorist Constantin Dobrogeanu-Gherea: "The great old man [...] was being laid down on a bier that a group of socialist painters, headed by Teodorescu Sion, had previously wrapped in red fabric." His wartime conduct and artistic merits resulted in formal recognition, and he was granted high honors—the Order of the Crown (as Officer) and Bene Merenti Medal, both in 1923. The same year, he participated in the Arta Română exhibit with Argeș County landscapes, including Fântâna lui Manole ("Manole's Fountain").

During the interwar period, in addition to Tinerimea and Arta Română salons, Theodorescu-Sion exhibited his work at the Atheneum, the Universul newspaper art show, Dalles Gallery and various other venues. With Ressu and Arthur Verona, Sion was also co-founder, in 1921, of Romania's first artists' trade union (Sindicatul Artelor Frumoase), which militated for basic social security but also had a political and (according to art expert Vasile Radu) "utopian" agenda. Briefly, their plans earned official support during the interval when Victor Eftimiu, a Symbolist playwright and rich art collector, was Minister of Culture and the Arts. In the early interwar years, Sion was also one of the art experts employed in the authentication of paintings by the Romanian classic Nicolae Grigorescu.

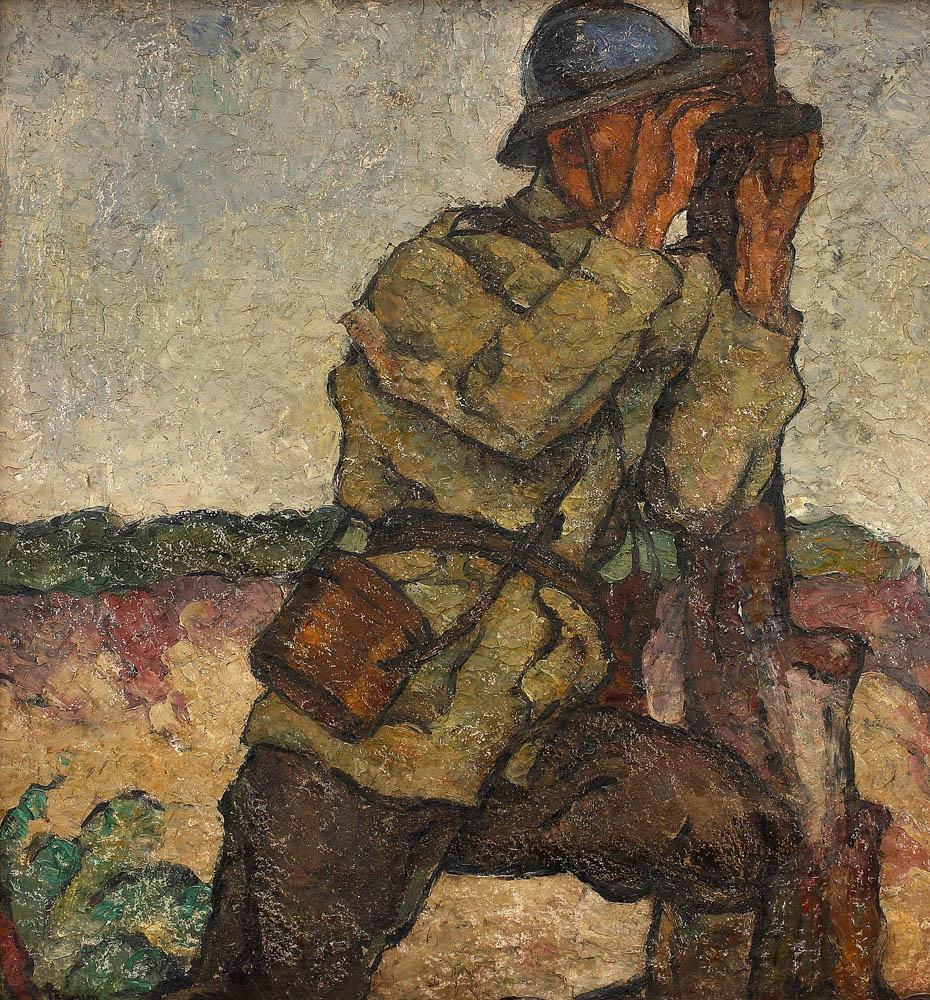
Cercetaș ("Scout", 1917)

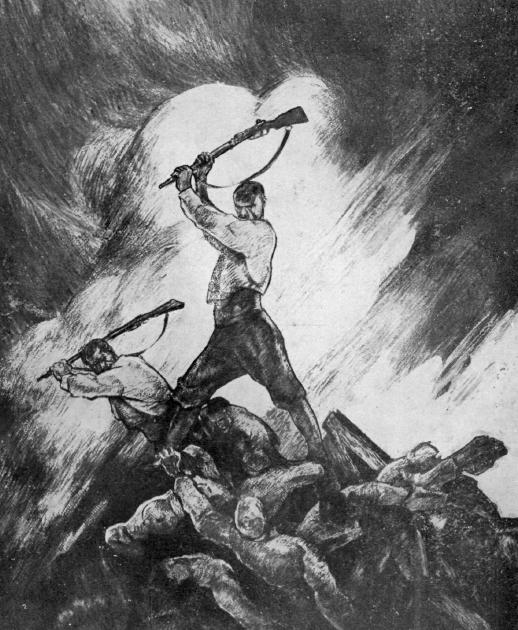
La Mărășești ("In Mărășești", 1919)

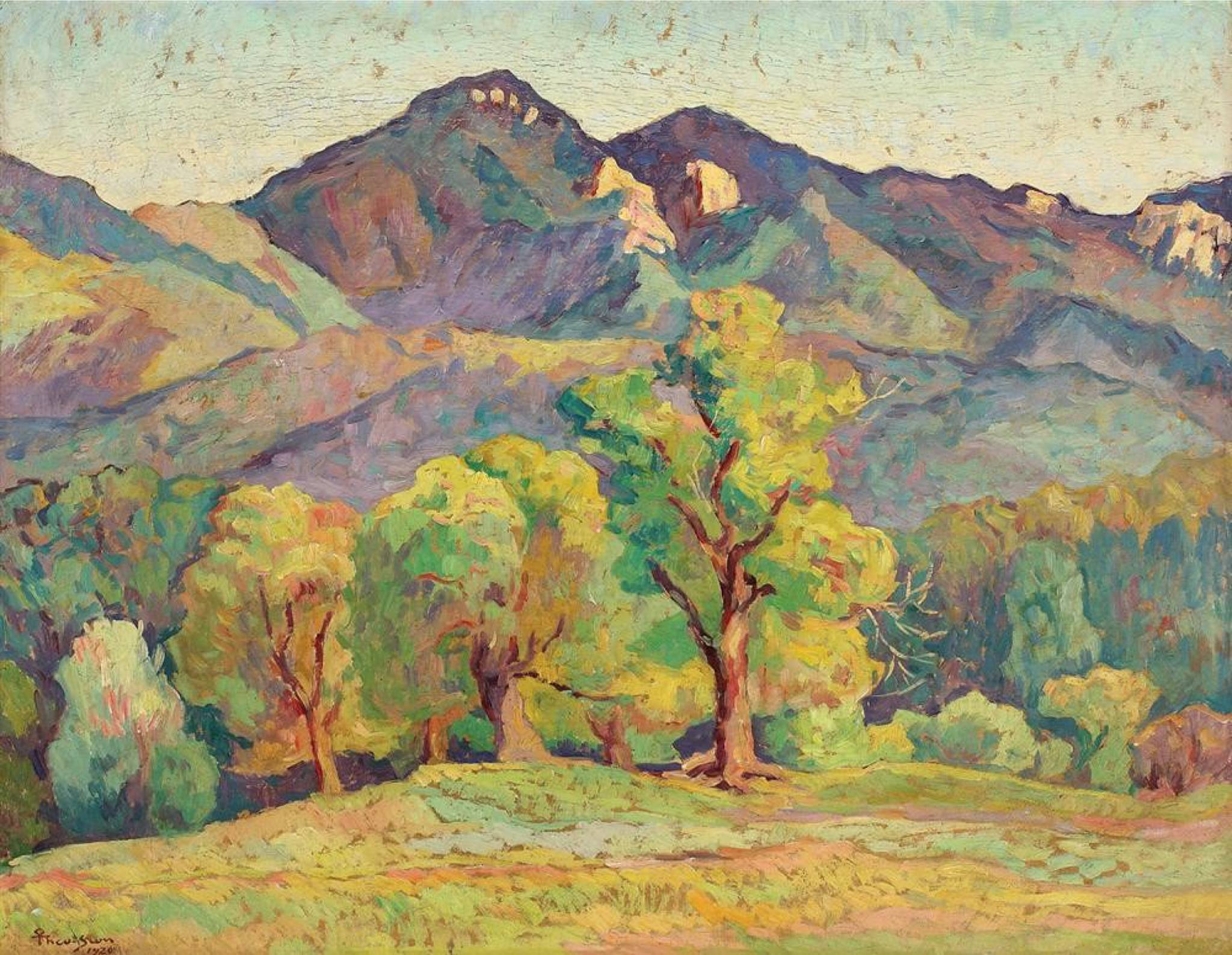
Piatra Craiului (1920)

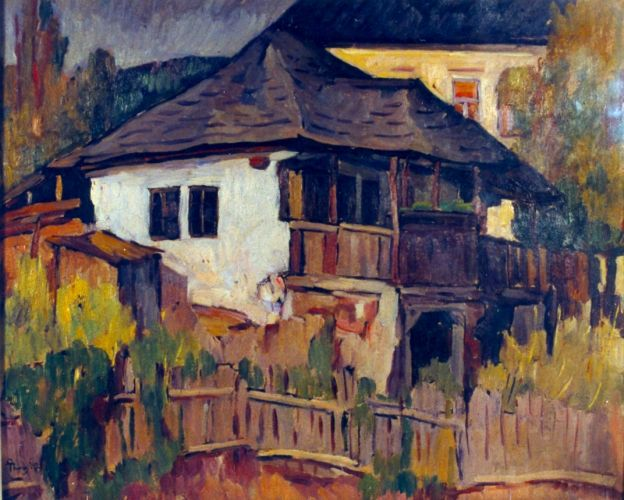
Casă țărănească din Curtea de Argeș ("Peasant Home in Curtea de Argeș", 1922)

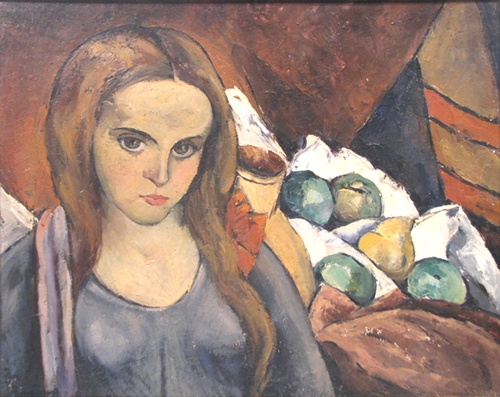
Miorița (1923)

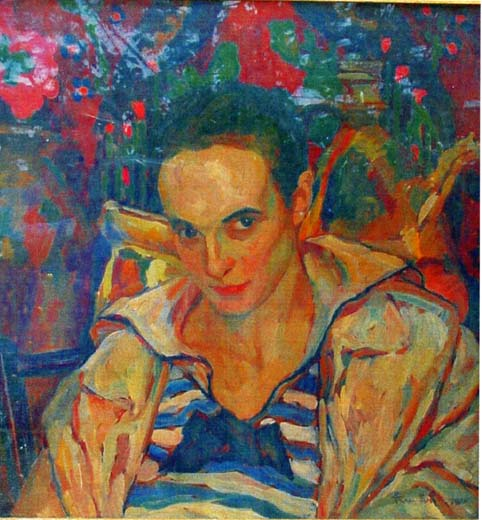
Lola Schmierer Roth

=== Gândirea years ===
The 1920s were a new period of synthesis in Theodorescu-Sion's life, as he became the artistic exponent of a neo-traditionalist movement centered on Gândirea magazine. Welcomed there by art columnist Oscar Walter Cisek, and later by editor in chief Nichifor Crainic, he provided illustrations to 1923's Satul meu ("My Village"), by Gândirist poet laureate Ion Pillat. Another former Symbolist, Tudor Arghezi, welcomed the change in style, writing: "Whosoever remembers Theodorescu-Sion's angles, points, squares, circles, semicircles and spheres will have thanked him for handing in his cap and taking on a better suited hat, and for parting with the confabulations of a very reduced Symbolism". The painter still took commissions from the Symbolist movement, providing illustration to a Symbolist play by Ion Minulescu, in Cetiți-mă! monthly (January 1922).

The painter looked favorably to Gândirea's quest for a new national specificity in art, or "Romanianism". The authors of a 1970 retrospective, published with Editura Meridiane, describe the period as follows: "From very different perspectives, the magazines Viața Românească and Gândirea [...] militated for the creation of artworks inspired from the Romanian reality; and if, at a later date, Gândirism would bear the imprint of exacerbated nationalism, as one of the carriers for the far right ideology, it is no less true that, in its beginnings, the magazine defined its aesthetic credo by balancing it against art's necessity of expressing a national reality." In an interview with author Felix Aderca, Sion claimed: "The artistic feeling of Romanianism is separated from those of other peoples by a special sensitivity. Discretion applied to delicacy, harmony in a subdued chromatic. All things in union, calm and clear like a midsummer's afternoon." Gogîltan links Theodorescu-Sion's main period with the establishment of Greater Romania: "Ion Theodorescu-Sion 'national-themed' canvasses were the visual rendition of a United Kingdom of Romania geography, following its incorporation of Transylvania, Banat, Crișana and Bukovina in the year 1918." She believes that Sion's passion for depicting shepherds on their seasonal treks, or transhumance, is a symbol for Greater Romania as people meeting over pastures.

Re-adapting himself to what critic Tudor Vianu calls "the mountaineer's experience", Sion was resuming his travels deep into the mountains, in both Argeș County and areas of Transylvania. Of all the paintings he presented for the public during the Ileana Gallery Art Show in 1925, the vast majority were landscapes of the mountains, or compositions with shepherds and mountain-folk such as La isvorul Troiței ("At the Troița [Trinity] Spring"), alternating with new Balcic seascapes. There is the occasional still life: Roz și roș ("Pink and Red"), which probably alluded to a poem by Transylvanian author Octavian Goga, impressed Goga and was bought for the state by Ion Lapedatu. Sion returned to the same venue in early 1926, when his exhibited a diverse selection of his newer compositions, and was rewarded with a higher class Order of the Crown.

A noted figure on Bucharest's bohemian scene, the painter frequented the artistic-literary club at Casa Capșa restaurant. He sat at the same table with some of the modernist and neo-traditionalist writers (Camil Baltazar, Liviu Rebreanu, Vasile Voiculescu, Ilarie Voronca), and, story goes, was once caught up in a cake fight with the satirist and prankster Păstorel Teodoreanu. Sion satisfied public expectations with portraits of the Bucharest upper middle class and proposed a design for the Vasile Alecsandri Mausoleum. He lost the latter commission to Paul Molda—reportedly, Sion preserved a bitter grudge against the Romanian Academy, who had ruled against him in this matter.

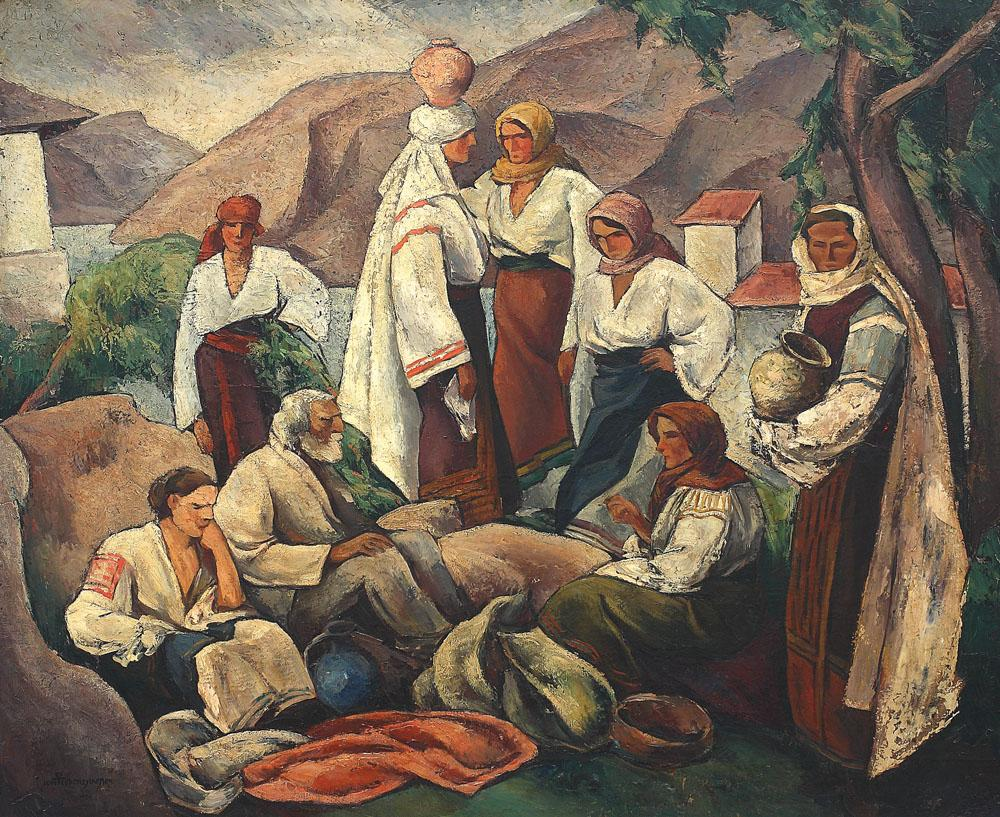
Compoziție cu motive românești ("Composition with Romanian Motifs", 1924)

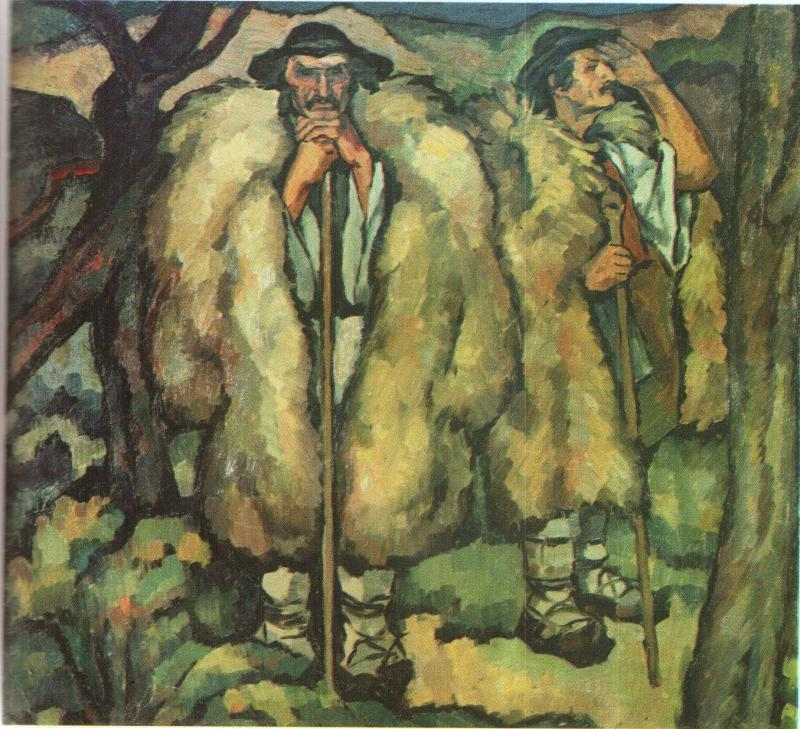
Mocani ("Mountain Folk")

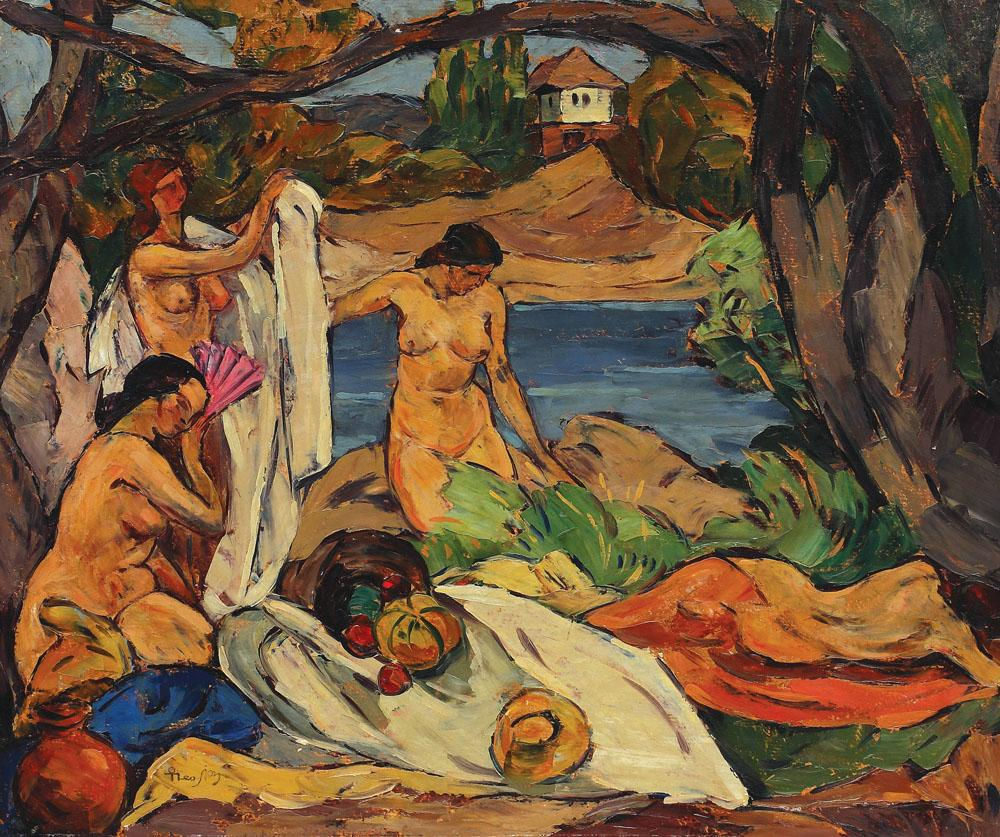
Pe malul apei ("By the Water", c. 1925)

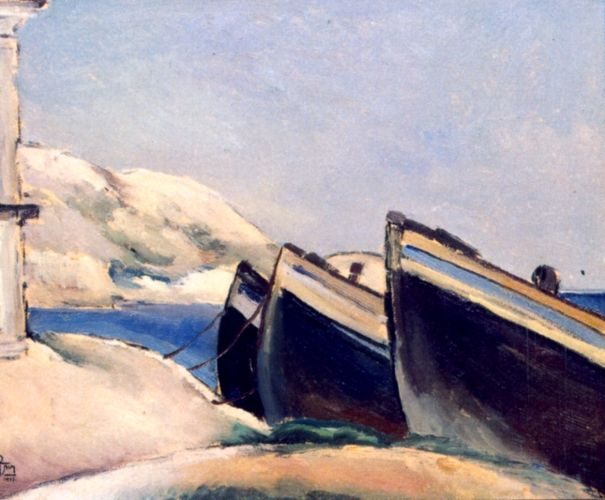
Bărci ("Boats", 1927)

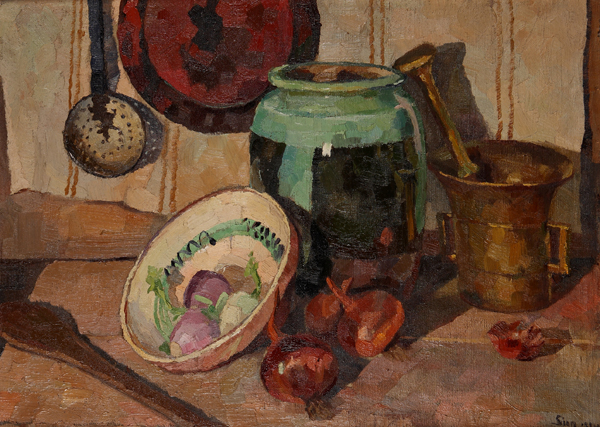
Natură statică cu legume și vase ("Still-life with Vegetables and Pottery")

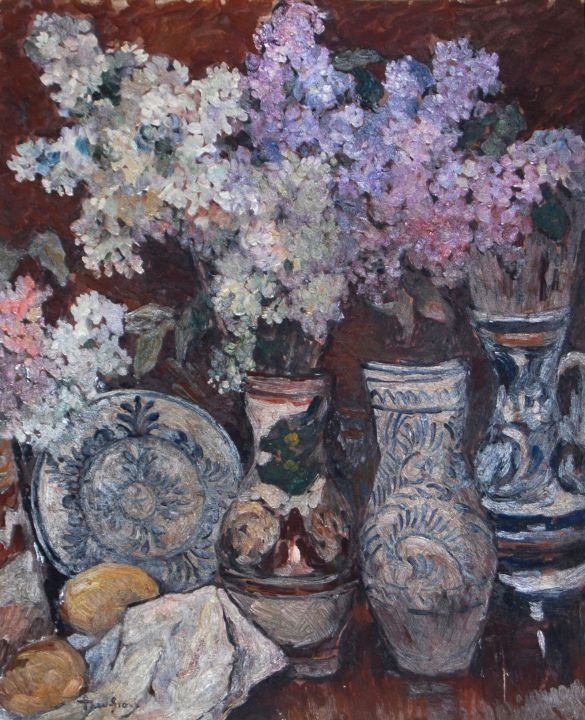
Mălini ("Hackberry Flowers")

=== Final decade ===
Around 1927, Theodorescu-Sion was again concentrating on his murals: his only works at the Official Salon for that year were studies for a wall painting called Șipotul ("Gushing Spring"). Returning to Constanța in 1928, he helped organize an official art show to mark the semicentennial of Romanian rule over that region. His own paintings were selected to represent Romanian art at Expo 1929 in Barcelona, Spain, and was part of the 1930 international exhibits in The Hague and Amsterdam.

By then, he had turned his back on the portrait genre, including on his trademark canvasses of peasants and shepherds, and his art became semi-abstract. He was seen in modernist circles, and contributed to the 1934 exhibit Peisajul bucureștean ("The Landscape of Bucharest"), with paintings dating back to 1919. A year later, he had a retrospective show at Dalles, which ran parallel to the debut exhibit of Alexandru Ciucurencu. Zambaccian recalls that Sion felt jealousy toward Ciucurencu's fast rise. According to Zambaccian's own account: "And since I was more preoccupied with Ciucurencu than Theodorescu Sion, he got upset and put up a sign on the door of his exhibit: 'No Entry for Dogs and Zambaccian'. Of course the storm soon subsided. The painter's wife tore off the card, and Theodorescu Sion kissed me when we met again!"

During the final five years of his life, Sion was becoming a sympathizer of Romania's King, the authoritarian Carol II; with Olga Greceanu and Marius Bunescu, he represented, under Carol's rule, the officially-supported version of modern painting. His work was again featured at a world's fair, the 1937 Exposition Internationale des Arts et Techniques dans la Vie Moderne in Paris. The same year, he was one of the artists involved in decorating the Bucharest Royal Palace (National Museum of Art), and was registered as a state-approved church muralist by government ordinance.

Theodorescu-Sion died in Bucharest, on March 31, 1939, and was buried in a Bellu cemetery crypt. His last selection of works was presented to the public as part of the Official Salon, which opened the same month in Bucharest. Gândirea published his obituary, signed by Crainic, and opening with the words: "Theodorescu-Sion died unexpectedly, in the full summer of his life and of his boundlessly fecund talent."

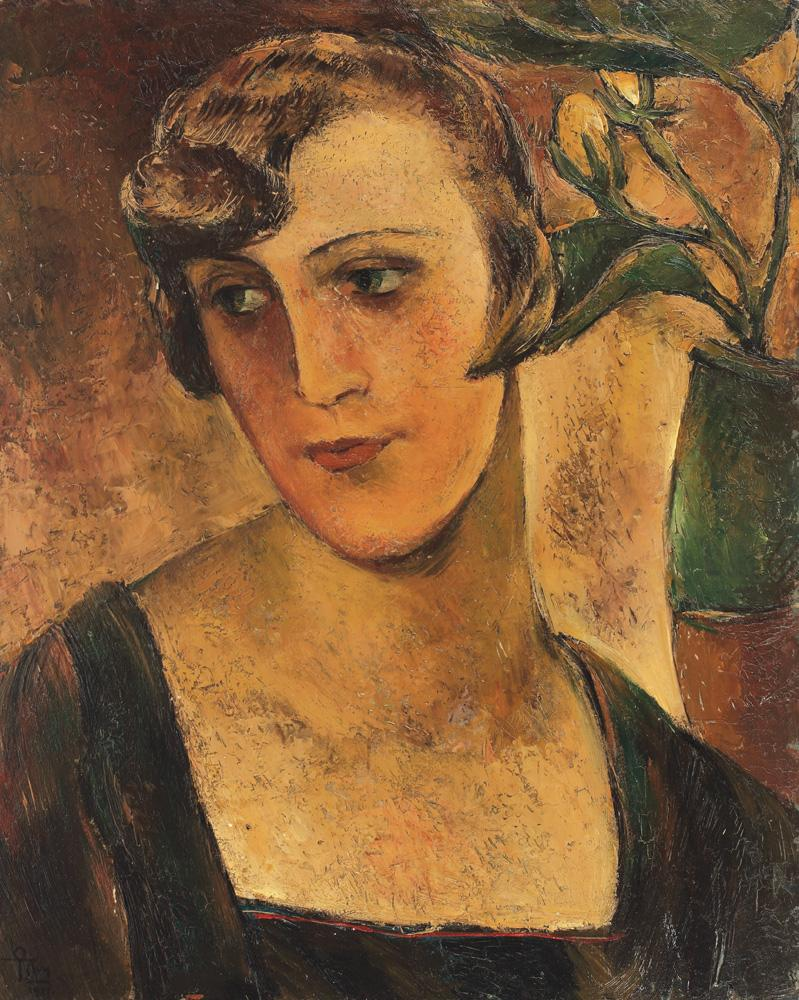
Artista ("The Artist", 1927)

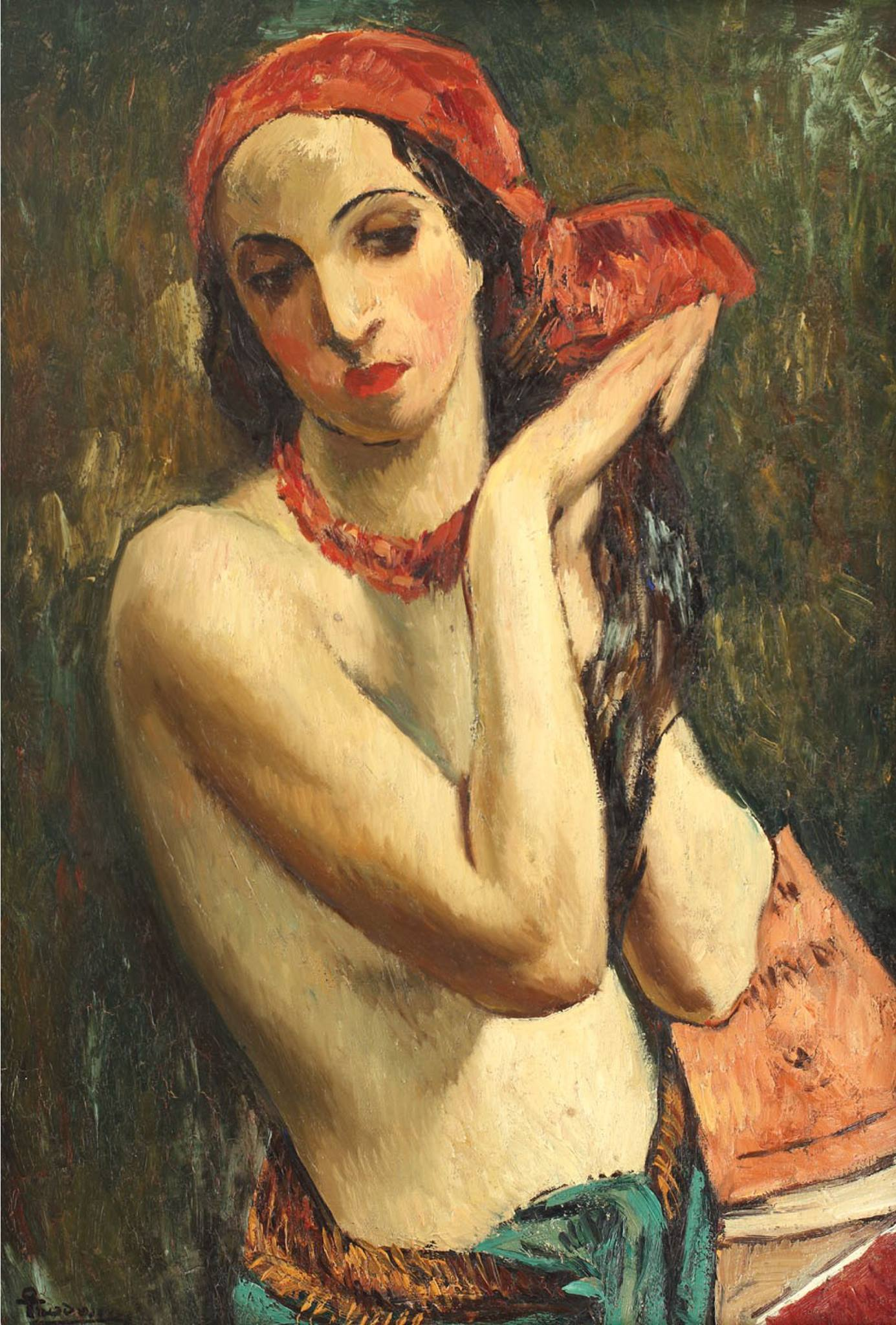
Tulpanul roșu ("Red Muslin", 1931)

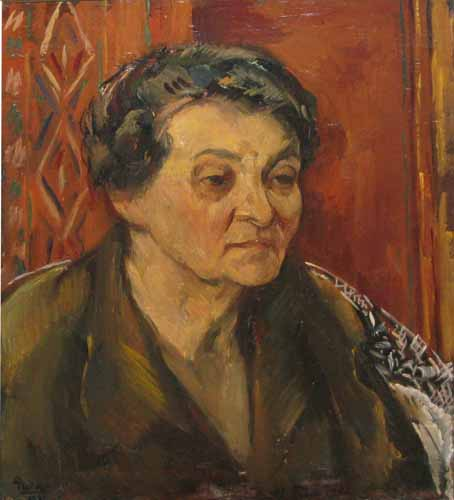
Măicuța Maria Ciuceanu ("Sister Maria Ciureanu", 1931)

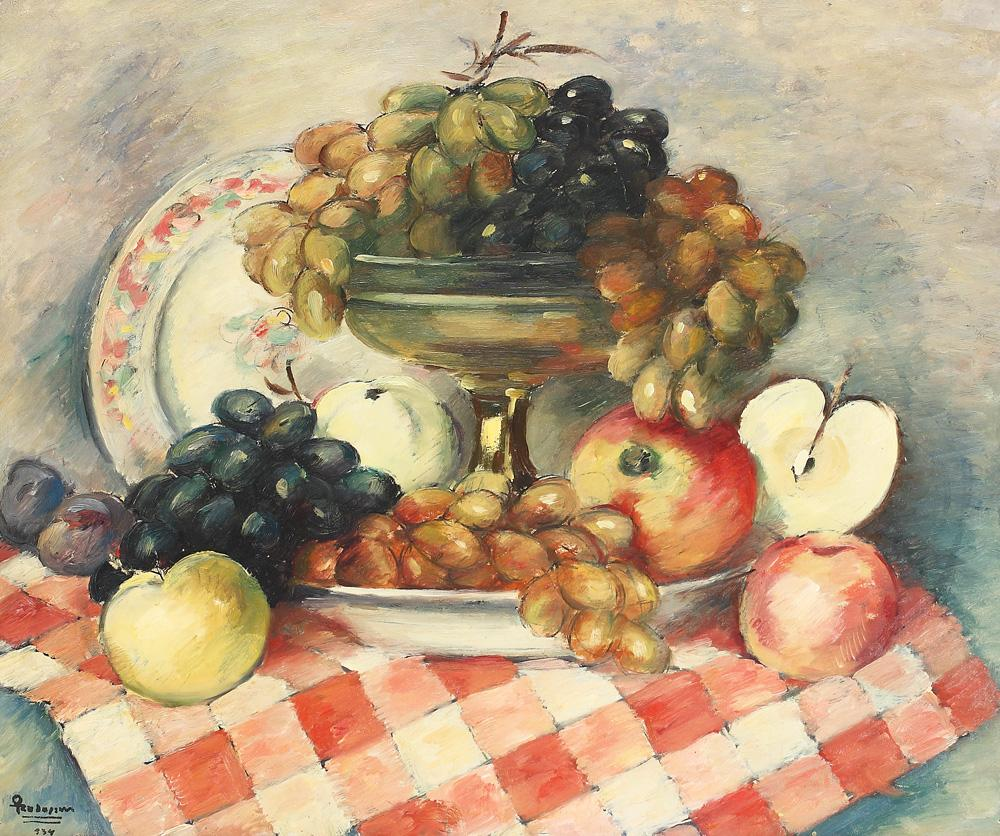
Natură statică cu struguri și mere ("Still-life with Grapes and Apples", 1934)

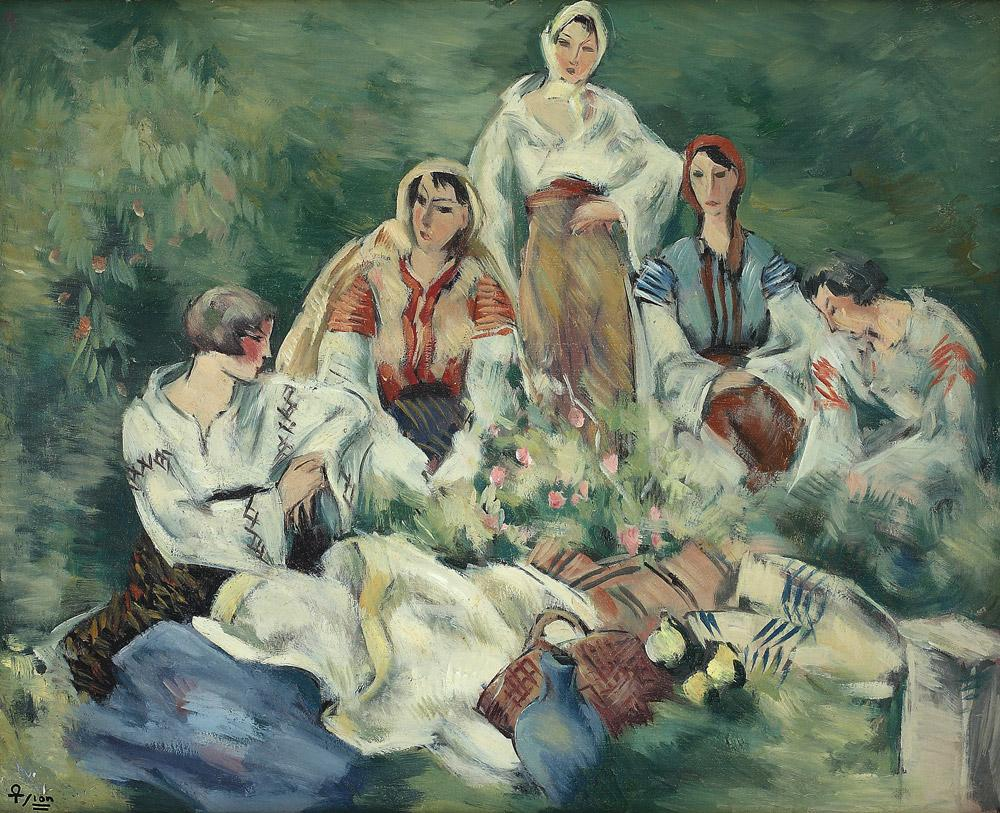
Compoziție pe motive țărănești ("Composition with Peasant Motifs", 1936)

== Work ==
=== Experimenter ===
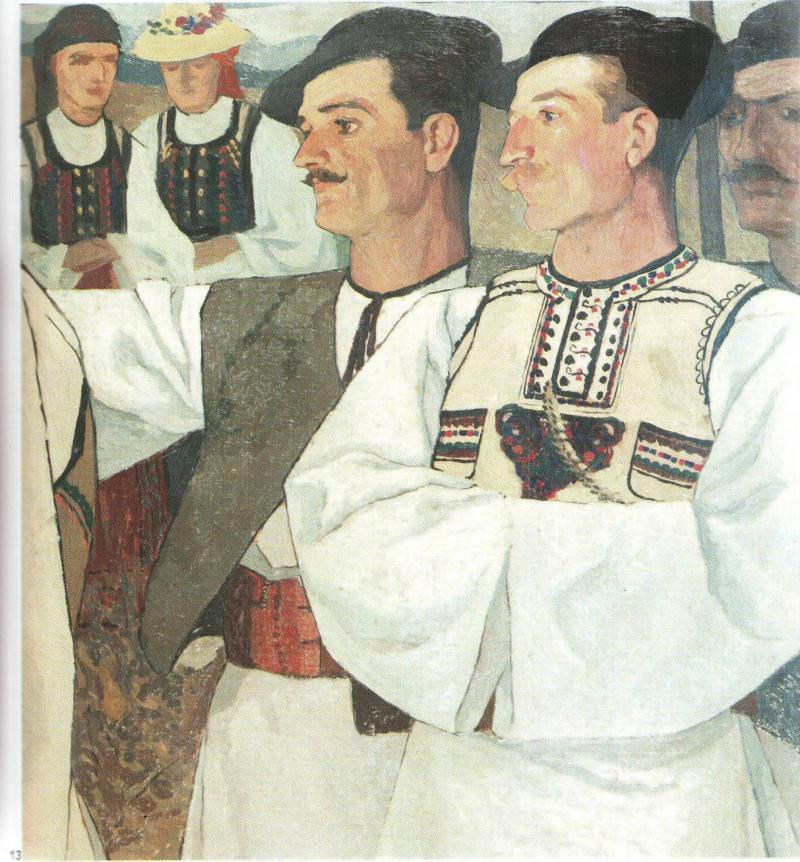
Țărani din Abrud ("Peasants of Abrud", c. 1913)

Theodorescu-Sion was probably the most protean Romanian oil painter. Sion's interests in trying out formulas was taken with reserve by some in the public. Writing for the Transylvanian readership of Luceafărul, in May 1909, George Murnu contended: "Teodorescu Sion is a new talent that ought to work hard before reaching the profundity of observation which makes one an artist. He is altogether too preoccupied with technical matters and too superficial in his drawing." Five years later, Tăslăuanu was to assess: "Mr. Theodorescu-Sion's art [...] doesn't agree with all people on first impression. [...] The primitive and decorative genre, with simple lines and expressive planes, has not won [it] many adherents. His way of seeing and rendering things seen relates him to the modern art of other countries." However, "[his canvasses] are like those women who do not seek to please the eye and to resemble others. Once you get close to them, once you get to know them and study them, you fall under the spell of their profound simplicity and beauty."

As noted in 1913 by Luceafărul art columnist G. Duma, Sion took his painting "science" from French academies and "the grand masters", techniques from Synthetism in his religious work, and modern decorative elements in his landscapes. Duma describes Sion's 1913 paintings, especially Crai nou ("New Moon") and the Crucifixion, as a spiritual journey, and concludes: "In vibrant colors, with well-ordered planes, always directing us to the art of the future, the conscious painter Theodorescu-Sion dreams of and puts into song that aria which leads to immortality." Art historians have since disagreed about young Sion's focus on the existential mystery. Mariana Vida calls his early compositions "pathetically Symbolist", but, according to Amelia Pavel, his visions of solitary trees fuse Art Nouveau, "with its twisted lineaments", with elements taken out of Expressionism. She writes: "the leafless tree [is] a symbol of human alienation, of human powerlessness when faced with the immensity of nature". Pavel is explicitly contradicted by fellow Romanian scholar Dan Grigorescu: "the tree motif is probably closer to [Sion's] decorative-muralist vision of a hallmark monumentality, with its ethnicist implications".

Beyond the Symbolist context, Theodorescu-Sion's primitivism was a form of social investigation. G. Duma was among the early ones to describe Sion as the voice of a specific Romanian sensibility: "Theodorescu-Sion's art is the echo of a people's feelings [...]. It is the atavism of our purest art [...]. The artist creates, and the people he represents lives on through him, making it known to all other nations with definitive characteristics that [...] the sources of its own dreams are coming to light under a creative power. [...] One feels spiritually connected to Theodorescu-Sion, because one finds, buried into his pastures, the labor and suffering of a race that has produced the painter himself." According to Anca Gogîltan, the Tinerimea art show of 1910 was a watershed moment in the relationship between urban modern art and the rural majority of Romania, as both Theodorescu-Sion and Camil Ressu tackled rural life without idyllic conventionalism or moral indignation. She refers in particular to Sion's Transylvanian-themed Arat în Munții Abrudului ("Ploughing in the Mountains of Abrud"), "underlining man's civilizing action" rather than expressing "social critique". Prior to World War I, Gogîltan argues, Sion and Ressu were the visual partners of Romanian agrarianism (or Poporanism), seeking to emphasize, like Mihail Sadoveanu in the literary field, the "dignity", "resilience" and economic importance of the Romanian peasantry.

With his trips in Southern Dobruja, his palette became more luminous, as discussed by Tăslăuanu: "In new Dobruja with its effusion of light and warmth, all colors are lighter; countours more imprecise, less defined; the coloring mixture and contrast more pronounced and richer. In the light-steeped atmosphere of Balcic and Deliorman, the artist found subjects that agree with his understanding of poetic color." By 1919, he was also showing an interest in the landscape of suburbia. Cultural historian Sorin Alexandrescu argues that the resulting paintings, where the focus is on women and children, have an atmosphere of "calm" and "balance". These scenes of family life contrast with his other preoccupations of the late 1910s. As Oscar Walter Cisek notes, Sion's colors were still luminous, but his canvasses "seemed to have concentrated [...] something from the darkness of the great war", and, for a while, huddled together "boulders of sheer matter". According to Cisek, this preference hurt Sion's art for the next few years, but began to wear out with the completion of La isvorul Troiței.

In the context of Romanian artistic modernity, the parallel evolution of Sion and Iosif Iser has intrigued various commentators. Reviewer Gheorghe Oprescu argues that the resemblance between the two is primarily modulated by Sion's temperamental changes, by his "restless, perhaps less sure of itself, being". Another interwar critic, Aurel D. Broșteanu, writes that Sion (like Iser, but with more rustic influences) contributed to "the assimilation of a pictorial objectivity", and set it out against "amorphous and disorganized Impressionism."

=== Gândirist painter ===
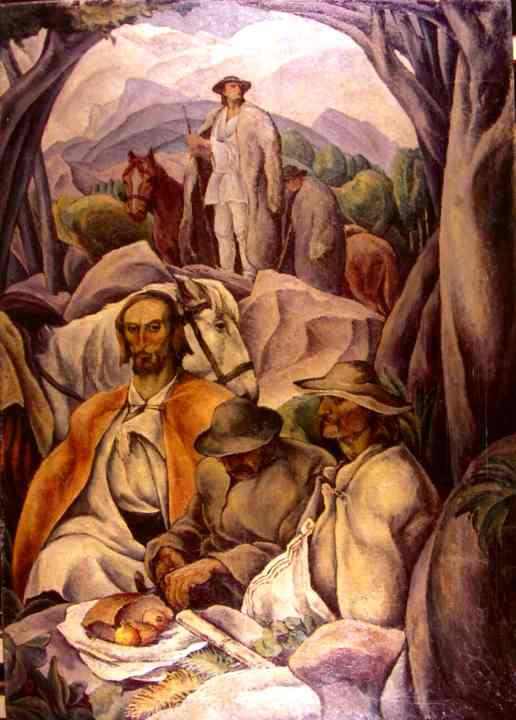
Străjerii ("The Guards", 1925)

Theodorescu-Sion's commitment to Gândirea aesthetics remains a much debated phase in his activity. Although the magazine's staff columnist noted with delight that he had abandoned his "belabored and obscure" methods for a "direct sensitivity", various authors propose that neo-traditionalism was the culmination of Theodorescu-Sion's decades of experiment. As a conclusion to his "calligraphic painting" theory, George Călinescu notes that "bit by bit, Romanian painting was gliding into the Neo-Byzantine", while Cisek sees the 1920s Sion as a Romanian anti-Impressionist painter of the "volume" and the "classical form", compatible with Cézanne, Derain or Max Unold. Likewise, Tudor Vianu refers to La izvorul Troiței and other works from c. 1925 as compositions of brute volumes, creating organic relationships between the figures and the landscape, an against claims that Theodorescu-Sion had become a neoclassic. Amelia Pavel additionally writes that the mature Sion returned to painting trees, with Expressionist filtered through Derain's pictorial techniques and, more characteristically, with a growing interest in making others discover the rural landscape of Romania. According to the Meridiane authors, his "rhythmic sequencing of volumes" shows a mix of influences distilled from contemporary Constructivism and echoes of the Symbolist master Pierre Puvis de Chavannes.

The environment typically depicted in most of Theodorescu-Sion's post-1918 creative periods is that of the mountains, of Argeș and of Motzenland. Vianu proposes that Theodorescu-Sion successfully fabricated himself the mentality of mountain dweller, with broken horizons and human figures seen from up close, with a somber palette that suggests "the coolness and secrecy one finds in a forest canopy." He notes: "one may document the nature of the man who created this painting style with his famous Self-portrait he exhibited [in 1925], where the protruding anatomy of his face, the unibrow, the one eye open and scanning, evoke in truth the very image of an ancestor from the mountains." Sion's polemic with urban life was becoming explicit. As historian Anca Gogîltan writes, one of his Peisaje ("Landscapes"), dating c. 1922, has "the delicate figure of a peasant woman showing up on the edge of a city, dominated by the modern city as a densely packed background, seemingly a screen of geometric shapes." Still lifes such as Roz și roș, she notes, show that he catered to the public's growing interest in folk art items, depicting rustic plates or cruses; other works make note of the actual hierarchies of the rural space, showing women thoroughly involved in household chores such as laundering. As noted in 1931 by Broșteanu, there were three deep influences on Sion's still lifes and portraits: the antique ceramic art of Romania, alongside Derain's pictorial vision, and, "unmistakably" so, the post-Impressionist canvasses of Ștefan Luchian.

According to his promoter Cisek, Theodorescu-Sion's organic treatment of nature emanates from "the fundamental law" of Romania's ancient folk arts, namely: "man does not master surrounding nature; he grows from the stony and craggy soil [...] like plants, like trees, like animals." This, Cisek argues, was the revelation of a true artistic expression of the Romanian soul, opposed to the idyllic canvasses of Impressionist master Nicolae Grigorescu, but akin to the Poporanist prose of Calistrat Hogaș. In 1926, he assessed: "It has been said—and many among the artistically illiterate continue to repeat as much to this day—that only Grigorescu's art can ever be Romanian, and that Theodorescu-Sion's painting can have nothing in common with the substance of our soil. [...] tomorrow perhaps, [he] may find himself able to overturn skeptical impressions and theories". Cisek depicts Sion as Romania's "best connoisseur of artistic techniques", with a "sovereign mastery", locating him at the opposite end from post-Grigorescu official art. Sion's understanding of national specificity, he argues, had nothing in common with the "mulligan" traditionalism of Octav Băncilă and Kimon Loghi: "if Mr. Loghi is a painter, then Teodorescu-Sion must surely be something else entirely! One should bear in mind that Mr. Teodorescu-Sion is still developing, whereas 'Master' Loghi has reached his summit. The summit of mediocrity." Contrarily, Nichifor Crainic, who was a Grigorescu aficionado, posthumously described Sion as Grigorescu's one equal; however, he noted, Sion bowed to commissions, and as such never produced an actual masterpiece.

Vianu's friend and Gândirea contributor Lucian Blaga, a poet-philosopher on the search for Romanian specificity, applauded Theodorescu-Sion's paintings of "super-shepherds and super-peasants" in "Romanian landscapes", while, from another side of modern literature, Victor Eftimiu celebrated Sion as a "cultured" and "refined" figure among the traditionalists. Art reviewer Petru Comarnescu also suggests that Theodorescu-Sion did in fact live up to the expectation of a purely Romanian art, by going back to the "naturalized Byzantine art" of medieval muralists, particularly so in Șipotul. Although he constructs a similar argument, the religious commentator Crainic finds that Sion was less secure as a Christian artist, even though, he notes, Gândirea itself encouraged him to paint modern Romanian icons.

=== "Reactionary" modernist ===
The mixture of themes and the controversies surrounding Gândirist politics have also touched Sion's artistic contributions. In the 1920s, the artistic vision proposed by Sion and Ressu was being contested by the avant-garde school of Contimporanul. Also inspired by primitive art, its leaders Ion Vinea and Marcel Janco refused to view the others as actual exponents of peasant traditions. The more radical experimenters, including Sion's student Jacques Hérold, rejected tame modernism altogether, turning to Surrealism; but young neo-traditionalists such as Elena Popea found in it a source of inspiration. Retrospectively, philosopher and curator Erwin Kessler finds in Sion the exponent of "a reactionary Romanian modernism": artistic nationalism, coming at a time when all modern Romanian art was divided along ethnic lines ("the ethnic component of classical modernism played an important role, one that should be explained, not occulted"). Kessler additionally notes that there is a radical component to Sion's belief in the organic relationship of men and the soil, likening it to the main concepts of Romanian nationalism and traditionalism—from A. C. Cuza's antisemitism to Virgil Madgearu's agrarianism, and passing through Blaga's theory on folk architecture. Also an antisemite, Crainic contended that Sion's art never made an impression on the art market, since the buyers were "mostly Jewish".

Various critics have noted that Sion's works of the 1920s and '30s are generally awkward, "scholastic", or geometrical and impersonal. The Meridiane study finds some of his works to be "emphatic", noting that Sion "does not reach into the philosophical meaning of folk mythology, retaining only its picturesque exterior." In some of his late canvasses, Sion makes a comeback to Symbolism, but gives it a "Rococo" twist, for instance by having his wife pose in crinoline.

== Legacy ==
Ion Theodorescu-Sion's "premature death" was, according to critic I. Zărnescu, a moment of crisis for Romanian art: "[it] leaves an emptiness in our art, just when he, the man of support and encouragement, was most sorely needed." The painter received several tributes from his peers. Novelist Camil Petrescu makes an oblique—and, Sorin Alexandrescu points out, chronologically inaccurate—mention of his urban landscapes in the 1933 novel Patul lui Procust; Alexandrescu believes that it serves to amplify the nostalgic mood in that particular fragment of the book. In addition to his self-portraits, Sion's likeness was preserved in a bust, the work of sculptor Corneliu Medrea (according to Nichifor Crainic, Medrea "wonderfully" captured the painter's proud demeanor and physical beauty). Medrea also designed Sion's crypt at Bellu cemetery.

Sion's fame declined with the years. His cultural legacy was in part preserved by his Gândirea colleagues, including those who later moved into far right politics. After World War II and the establishment of Romania's communist regime, some of the latter were arrested, while others fled abroad. One of the latter was political journalist Pamfil Șeicaru, who even took some of Sion's paintings with him when he relocated to Francoist Spain. In 1972, Gândirea's pro-fascist editor Crainic had been released from jail and, once rehabilitated, was writing chronicles in Glasul Patriei, a communist magazine for the Romanian diaspora. His article on Theodorescu-Sion was read and admired by Șeicaru, who wrote back to thank his former employer.

The National Museum of Art of Romania (MNAR) has a sizable Theodorescu-Sion collection. Much of it has been included in the Modern Romanian Art Gallery, reopened and rearranged by MNAR in 2001. Although long expected by critics, this new collection sparked debates: critic Gheorghe Vida found that Sion's presence, like that of other modern artists, was unjustly overshadowed by the inclusion of lesser, "second-shelf", painters of the interwar age. A 2006 donation of the Lola Schmierer Roth collection also supplemented MNAR's Theodorescu-Sion fund with works he had set aside for his former pupil. Other sizable Sion collections are held by the art museums of Constanța and Tulcea, and by the Zambaccian Museum in Bucharest.

Still emergent after the Romanian Revolution of 1989, the Romanian art market was ambivalent in its treatment of Theodorescu-Sion's work. Writing in 2009, art critic Pavel Șușară denounced "an unacceptable disagreement" between Sion's status as a "first-class artist" and the low starting prices of his canvasses, as opposed to the "exorbitant sums" fetched by painters such as Sabin Bălașa. That year, his Cele trei vârste ("The Three Ages") was sold for 32,000 lei. Interest in Theodorescu-Sion's work appears to have renewed itself by 2010, when the auctioned Sions fetched prices of the highest range.

The avant-garde's polemic with Sion's neo-traditionalism continues posthumously. In 2009, Erwin Kessler organized a collective show with the theme "Pork". Kessler explained that the pig, the staple food of modern Romania's consumerism, stood to replace the sheep as the "totem" of Theodorescu-Sion and Nicolae Grigorescu. The tongue-in-cheek exhibit featured conceptual artworks by Matei Bejenaru, Dumitru Gorzo, Ion Grigorescu, Dan Perjovschi and various others.
