= Ion Sân-Giorgiu =

Romanian businessman (1893 - 1950)

Ion Sân-Giorgiu (also known as Sîn-Giorgiu, Sângiorgiu or Sîngiorgiu; 1893–1950) was a Romanian modernist poet, dramatist, essayist, literary and art critic, also known as a journalist, academic, and fascist politician. He was notably the author of works on the Sturm und Drang phenomenon and the influence of Johann Wolfgang von Goethe. During his early years, he was influenced by Expressionism and contributed to the literary magazine Gândirea; he progressively moved towards support for the Iron Guard (the Legionary Movement), edited the far right journal Chemarea Vremii, and spent his last years as a member of Horia Sima's government in exile.

== Biography ==
Born in Botoşani, Sân-Giorgiu was educated in Germany. He debuted as a traditionalist poet, affiliated with the group originally formed around Sămănătorul magazine. According to literary historian Eugen Lovinescu, he was, with Anastasie Mândru and George Vâlsan, one of the best-known Sămănătorul poets in the Regat regions.

With time, Sân-Giorgiu moved towards modernist literature. In 1921, he contributed a serialized column on "Dramatic Expressionism" to Adevărul Literar şi Artistic, later published as a single volume. Sân-Giorgiu's views on Expressionism and modernism, like those of Gândirea itself, oscillated: in early 1923, he commented negatively in regard to the tendencies of younger poets to "discard metaphors", but later authored reviews and essays welcoming the trend. At the time, Sân-Giorgiu notably contributed essays on the literature of Georg Kaiser and Walter Hasenclever to Gândirea. His 1922 play Masca ("The Mask"), which followed Expressionist guidelines, was among the series of avant-garde productions staged by Victor Ion Popa during the interwar period.

During the early 1930s, he seconded Victor Eftimiu inside the Romanian PEN Club (of which he was General Secretary). A frequenter of Casa Capşa restaurant, Sân-Giorgiu was, according to the art collector Krikor Zambaccian, involved in a dispute with poet N. Davidescu which eventually turned violent. By that time, he was again discarding modernist approaches to literature, and returning to traditionalist techniques and subjects.

Initially, he was opposed to antisemitism, defining it as "an act of poverty of a failed intellectual or a cheap opportunity of self-assertion" and "a stupid ferment of anarchic agitation". Nevertheless, he changed his position, by rallying with the leading antisemitic and fascist camp. By 1938, Sân-Giorgiu expressed his support for Nazism and reportedly made a habit of wearing a Nazi-inspired swastika on his clothes, while maintaining close contacts with the authoritarian King Carol II. According to the marginalized Romanian Jewish author Mihail Sebastian, rumor had it that, in 1936, Sân-Giorgiu sought endorsement from Nazi Germany and competed for its attention with Nae Ionescu, a far right philosopher who had broken with Carol and supported the Iron Guard. The same account has it that Sân-Giorgiu and his journalist ally Pamfil Şeicaru managed to undermine Ionescu's standing, by presenting Nazi officials with proof that the philosopher had dealings with the prominent Jewish banker Aristide Blank.

Sân-Giorgiu was a member of the fascist and antisemitic National Christian Party (PNC), which took power when Carol appointed its leader Octavian Goga as Premier. In 1938, after the PNC fell in disfavor with the monarch, Ion Sân-Giorgiu rallied with the latter's National Renaissance Front, becoming its official journalist. Goga's dismissal caught Ion Sân-Giorgiu on a theatrical tour of Germany. Sebastian, who conversed with him right after, mentions him being "unrecognizable", and records his claims that the PNC was responsible for a series of mistakes, and notes that Sân-Giorgiu took no apparent displeasure in talking to a Jew, being "friendly and communicative". Also according to Sebastian, Sân-Giorgiu claimed to have registered major successes in Germany, having stated: "Not even Ibsen had such a triumph; not one unfavorable review."

In November 1940, after the Iron Guard established its National Legionary State government, Sân-Giorgiu threw his support behind the latter, while expressing his new thoughts on the Romanian Jewish community and racial policies in a column for Chemarea Vremii:

"Legionary Romania has solved the Jewish Question. That which the Oct. Goga-presided government has only attempted, the Legion has managed to achieve in less than three months. The Jews have been removed not just from the state apparatus, but also from the industry [and] commerce, where cooperative and neat Legionary organizations are striving and succeeding in taking their place. [...] We have a duty to pose overtly and without delay the problem of liquidating this miserable ghetto that is currently forming itself. It is time to ask: What do we do with them? Because to leave them free to multiply like rabbits, to consume our goods, to hate us and produce nothing in return, that cannot be. In Legionary Romania there is no room for drones. [...] It would serve Jews to know that we are not the passive bearers of a social rot, but the national surgeons of a national cancer. Hence I ask our own: what do we do with them? And I ask the Jews to reply honestly: what do you do?"

During the same year, Sân-Giorgiu's newspaper published influential essays by Mihail Manoilescu, who advocated corporatism and called for its implementation in the National Legionary State. Having survived the violent clash between the Iron Guard and their nominal partner, Conducător Ion Antonescu (events known as the Legionary Rebellion), he left Romania after Antonescu's regime and Romania's alliance to the Axis powers crumbled in autumn 1944 (see Soviet occupation of Romania). He joined Sima's Vienna-based Legionary cabinet, holding a nominal office as Minister of Education. The justice system in Communist Romania tried him in absentia, and sentenced him to death. The writer died in exile.

Sân-Giorgiu's daughter, Ioana, stayed behind in Romania. She later married Vintilă Corbul, a genre fiction author, screenwriter and former lawyer, who had faced political persecution in the 1950s. Ioana Sân-Giorgiu died of cancer in 1969; ten years later, Corbul defected and restarted his writing career in France (where he died in 2008).

== Work ==
Sân-Giorgiu's early Sămănătorist works, influenced by Panait Cerna and Mihai Eminescu, were thought by Lovinescu to be "lacking in originality". As he gradually moved towards modernism, Lovinescu notes, the poet displayed "abuse of imagery", "the perkiness of free forms", "egocentrism" and "tumultuous sensualism."

The earliest of his plays were characterized by Lovinescu as "Expressionist travesties, which do away with observation and even with talent, being content with ideas and theories". Masca showed the interactions between three amorous couples, all of whom are masked. One of the pairs, a female billionaire and her male artist lover, find themselves on the verge of an existential crisis as their masks are removed, and is on the verge of splitting up. According to Lovinescu: "It's fortunate that the author-theorist would intervene to put [their masks] up again, thus enabling them to go on lying to one another." In the 1925 drama Femeia cu două suflete ("The Woman with Two Souls"), Expressionism is toned down, but still present, particularly in the author's refusal to specify the setting and the characters' background—in reference to this aspect, Lovinescu writes: "Nothing [in it] is [...] seen, individualized, localized; everything is reduced to a possible subject." The plot deals with a forceful ménage à trois situation: the female singer Mona, obsessively loved by the sculptor Dionis, accepts the advances of Fink, a theater manager, and, overwhelmed by shame, decides to kill herself.

By 1926, having discarded Expressionism and returned to a traditional style, Sân-Giorgiu wrote a series of satirical plays, among which was Banchetul ("The Banquet"). Lovinescu notes that they owed inspiration to 19th century author Ion Luca Caragiale.
