= Oscar Walter Cisek =

Romanian writer, diplomat and art critic

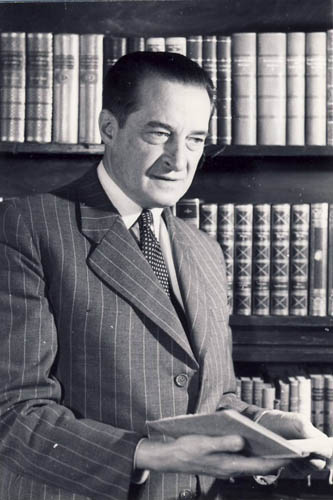
Oskar Cisek

Oscar Walter Cisek ([tsízek] or [tšisek]; 6 December 1897 - 30 May 1966) was a Romanian writer, diplomat, and art critic, who authored short stories, novels, poems and essays in both German and Romanian.

== Biography ==
Of Transylvanian Saxon descent, Cisek was born and died in Bucharest. After attending Bucharest's Evangelische Schule, he graduated in German studies and Art history from the Ludwig-Maximilians-Universität München.

Noted for his art chronicle and essays in the literary magazine Gândirea, he helped popularize modernist and avant-garde cultural trends in the 1920s Romania. After 1930, he entered the diplomatic corps of the Romanian Kingdom, serving as Cultural and Press Attaché in Austria, Czechoslovakia, and Germany. From 1946 to 1947, after the start of Soviet occupation in Romania and until the Communist regime was established, Cisek was General Consul in Berlin.

He was imprisoned by Communist authorities, and, after being set free, resumed his work as a writer in Bucharest. Rehabilitated, Cisek was a recipient of the Romanian Academy's Ion Creangă Prize shortly before his death, and became a corresponding member of the German Democratic Republic's Akademie der Künste.

== Works in German ==
- Die Tatarin (1929)
- Strom ohne Ende (1937)
- Vor den Toren (1950)
- Das Reisigfeuer (1960)
