= Gândirea =

Romanian literary, political and art magazine

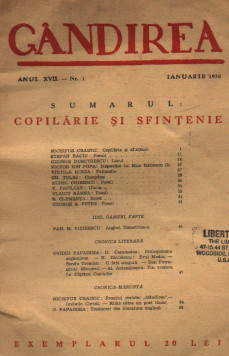
- Cover of Gândirea, 1938
- Categories: Literary magazine
- Frequency: Monthly
- First issue: May 1, 1921
- Final issue: 1944
- Country: Romania
- Language: Romanian

Gândirea ("The Thinking"), known during its early years as Gândirea Literară - Artistică - Socială ("The Literary - Artistic - Social Thinking"), was a Romanian literary, political and art magazine.

== Overview ==
Founded by Cezar Petrescu and D. I. Cucu in the city of Cluj, and first issued on May 1, 1921, as a literary supplement for the Cluj-based Voința, it was originally a modernist and expressionist-influenced journal. During its early existence, it attracted criticism from the traditional cultural establishment for allegedly allowing influences from Germanic Europe to permeate Romanian culture. Gândirea moved to Bucharest in October 1922, and, in 1926, its leadership was joined by the nationalist thinker Nichifor Crainic; he became its director and ideological guide in 1928, gradually moving it toward a mystical Orthodox focus — itself occasionally referred to as Gândirism. With just two interruptions in publication (1925 and 1933–34), Gândirea became one of the most important cultural magazines of the Romanian interwar period.

A proponent of home-grown traditionalist ideas, it eventually found itself in opposition to Sburătorul, the modernist magazine headed by literary critic Eugen Lovinescu, as well as to the journal Viaţa Românească, which stood for the left-wing and agrarian current known as Poporanism. In its later years, Gândirea routinely hosted fascist-inspired and antisemitic articles, largely reflecting Crainic's own political views. By then, numerous disputes were taking place between Crainic's supporters and former Gândirea collaborators such as literary critic Tudor Vianu and poet Tudor Arghezi. Additional debates were carried between Crainic and the centrist political figures Nicolae Iorga and Constantin Rădulescu-Motru over the nature of nationalism and religion in Romania. The magazine often identified its secularist adversaries with materialism, and occasionally accused modernist figures in Romanian literature of writing pornography.

Gândirea was briefly closed down over suspicions that it was supporting the fascist Iron Guard, and, between 1938 and 1944, endorsed the successive dictatorial regimes of the National Renaissance Front, the National Legionary State, and Conducător Ion Antonescu. During World War II, it expressed support for Antonescu's antisemitic policies, which Crainic claimed to have inspired. Together with all other publications Crainic was heading, Gândirea ceased to be published in 1944, as Romania ended its alliance with the Axis powers.

== Contributors ==
Several circles were formed around Gândirea, bringing together a large part of the period's Romanian intellectuals: Ion Barbu, Vasile Băncilă, Lucian Blaga, Dan Botta, Alexandru Busuioceanu, Mateiu Caragiale, Vasile Ciocâlteu, Oscar Walter Cisek, Anastase Demian, Radu Gyr, N. I. Herescu, Vintilă Horia, Adrian Maniu, Gib Mihăescu, Tiberiu Moșoiu, Ștefan I. Nenițescu, Ovidiu Papadima, Victor Papilian, Ioan Petrovici, Ion Pillat, V. I. Popa, Dragoș Protopopescu, Ion Marin Sadoveanu, Ion Sân-Giorgiu, Zaharia Stancu, Dumitru Stăniloae, Paul Sterian, Francisc Șirato, Al. O. Teodoreanu, Ionel Teodoreanu, Sandu Tudor, Tudor Vianu, Pan M. Vizirescu, Vasile Voiculescu, G. M. Zamfirescu.

Many other intellectuals and artists had their work published in Gândirea, and some of them were only temporarily associated with the journal. They include Tudor Arghezi, George Călinescu, Șerban Cioculescu, Petre Pandrea, Mircea Eliade, Emil Cioran, Marcel Janco, Ion Vinea, and Mircea Vulcănescu.

== History ==
=== Beginnings ===
For much of the 1920s, the magazine was a venue for modernist criticism, and involved in theoretical debates over the influence of German- and Austrian-influenced Expressionism on early 20th century culture. Gândirea's early years coincided with the aftermath of World War I and the establishment of Greater Romania, making the magazine one of several newly established Romanian-language periodicals in the formerly Austro-Hungarian region of Transylvania. It has thus been argued that, before moving to Bucharest, the magazine was also involved in promoting a unitary Romanian culture inside the newly acquired province, but this appears to have been one of its secondary goals.

Without producing its own an artistic program, Gândirea counted among the few Romanian publications to praise Expressionist culture (its editors often extended the term to non-Expressionists such as Constantin Brâncuși, Max Reinhardt, Alexander Archipenko, and Dmitry Merezhkovsky). This focus on emotion and expression was especially present in essays contributed by Adrian Maniu and Ion Sân-Giorgiu, as well as in Ion Marin Sadoveanu's chronicles about the impact of Gothic traditions on early 20th century literature. The Expressionist trend, accompanied by Gândirea's frequent and sympathetic reviews of Futurism and Dada, caused Crainic (who was only a correspondent at the time), to express his distaste.

Despite hosting a large number of essays on art criticism, and in contrast to the style of avant-garde journals such as Contimporanul, Gândirea rarely featured Expressionist graphics. Notably, in 1924, the editors chose to illustrate an issue with a print by the proto-Expressionist Edvard Munch, commented upon by Tudor Vianu. Nevertheless, later in the same year, painter Francisc Şirato used Gândirea as a means to popularize his essays on Visual Arts in Romania, in which he publicized his break with Expressionist influences and his newfound interest in Romanian specificity in local art and folklore. In parallel, Oskar Walter Cisek's art chronicle (published between 1923 and 1929), gave, overall, equal exposure to all existing modernist trends.

Literature produced by the first of several Gândirea circles received criticism from several traditionalist circles for being one of "sick modernists". Notably, the historian and politician Nicolae Iorga, one of the major cultural figures of his time, cited fears that Romania was becoming "Germanized". He argued that, aside from Crainic's poetry it published, the magazine was copying Germanic ideals originating with the art groups of Munich and Vienna ("[Gândirea is] the window copy of modernist jargon muttered by Munich only to be responded through other parrotings, insane or charlatanesque, by Vienna").

By that moment, however, the magazine was itself fusing Expressionist influences with traditionalist aesthetic goals, to the point where it had become, according to Lucian Blaga, "a bouquet of centrifugal tendencies". During the 1920s, Gândirea hosted polemical articles by the traditionalists and traditionalist-inspired Iorga, Crainic, Cezar Petrescu, and Pamfil Şeicaru. Writing much later, Crainic expressed his opinion that the two visions were only apparently contradictory:

"Expressionism in painting is a German fatality. But from [Germany] it has migrated towards us as well. [...] Have the poetry of Blaga and Adrian Maniu, the theater of Blaga, Maniu, lost their ethnic (and therefore traditional) specificity for having borrowed the expressionist style from wherever?"

Reviewing the emphasis of traditionalism subsequently present in Gândirea's pages, the critic Ovid Crohmălniceanu argued that it was no less an evidence of a new kind of literature. Although the main proponent of traditionalism, Crainic himself remained open to some modernist influences, and translated the innovative works of Rainer Maria Rilke into Romanian.

=== Early conflicts ===
From the late 1920s and over much of its existence, Crainic's press engaged in polemics with modernists of the Eugen Lovinescu school, which at times turned into accusations that Lovinescu was "a petty poser" and "a falsifier of Romanian culture". Crainic and his traditionalist followers rejected Lovinescu's views on local "synchronism" with Western culture. Their attitude in regard to the latter has drawn comparisons with protochronist messages in Communist Romania, both claiming the superiority and primacy of Romanian culture over its Western counterparts. Although Crainic publicized his thoughts on the matter mainly through his other periodical, Sfarmă-Piatră, Gândirea notably hosted a 1926 article in which he likened the fight against Lovinescu's influence to "a second independence [of Romania]".

During the 1930s, Gândirea was at the center of virulent polemics involving, on one side, former contributors such as Tudor Arghezi and Tudor Vianu, and, on the other, those younger journalists who recognized Crainic as their mentor. Initially, this took the form of a Gândirist critique of both Modernism and the socialist-inspired current known as Poporanism: in a 1930 article for Gândirea, Crainic notably indicated his distaste for "the irremediable materialism" he believed to be professed by the rival Viaţa Românească.

Following this, Vianu, whose political options contrasted with the new trend, chose to discontinue his contributions and joined the staff at Viaţa Românească; although Lucian Blaga shared some views with Crainic, he too decided to distance himself from the magazine as early as 1930 (writing to Vianu that he did not consider himself a "disciple of our common friend Nichifor's Orthodoxy").

=== Crainic's impact ===
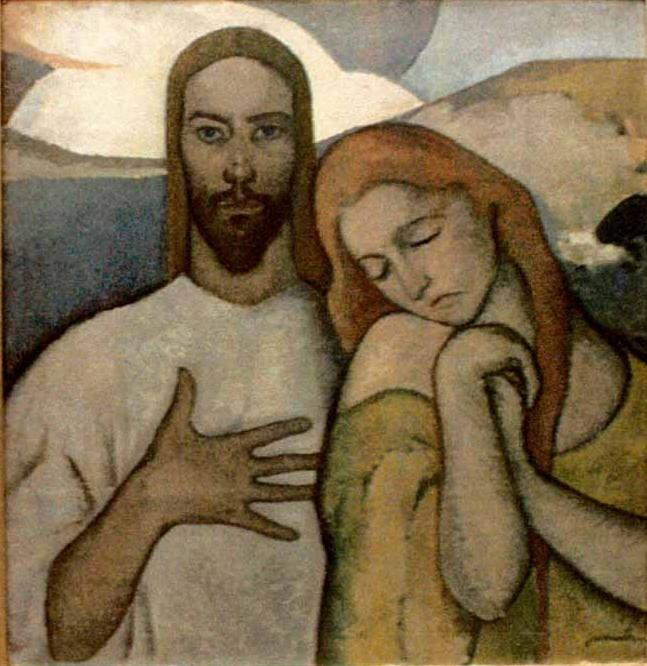
Religious painting by Sabin Popp, an artist whose work was praised by the traditionalists at Gândirea

In December 1931, as the magazine celebrated its first decade, Crainic summed up Gândirea's guidelines, stressing that its commitment to Orthodoxy, the Romanian monarchy and nationalism:

"[...] set apart a person from our generation from a thousand others — [these] are nothing other than absolutely necessary conditions which make possible the true spiritual life. [...] This is what our precursors cannot comprehend, [being] a sad generation liquidating a culture that was not theirs and through this was not even cultural."

The Viața Românească columnist George Călinescu was skeptical of Crainic's politics, and noted his alternation between various nationalist camps. Commenting on Gândirea's choice to support Carol II at the time when he replaced his son Mihai I as king (1930), he likened Crainic to Judas Iscariot:

"[Crainic is] a person incapable of any privation, seeker of pieces of silver and worldly pleasures, great seeker of noisy shindings where pistols are being fired, a cajoler and a careerist, outrageously dedicating Gândirea today to HRM Mihai, tomorrow to HRM Carol II, the day after tomorrow to the great apostle of the nation Nicolae Iorga, at any moment when the homage could be tied to the pursuit of a personal interest."

At the time, Gândirism owed inspiration to Russian émigré authors, both Orthodox traditionalists such as Nikolai Berdyaev and several advocates of the nationalist and mystical Eurasianist trend (Nikolai Trubetzkoy, Pyotr Savitsky, Pyotr Alexeyev, and Ivan Ilyin). Around 1934, Crainic reflected upon the connection his magazine had with other traditionalist cultural institutions, and concluded that his group was fulfilling the legacy of the more secular but equally traditionalist magazine Sămănătorul ("Over the land that we have learned to love from Sămănătorul we see arching itself the azure tarpaulin of the Orthodox Church. We see this substance of this Church blending in with the ethnic substance.")

More than a decade later, Călinescu argued that an enduring trait of Gândirism (to which he referred as Orthodoxism) had been a manifest belief in miracles. He believed to have noticed this in the works of Gândirea contributors such as Mircea Vulcănescu (in his homage to the deceased painter Sabin Popp, whom he allegedly regarded as "a saint"), Vasile Ciocâlteu ("who asks from God, in one of his poems, the favor to hold hot coals in his hands") and the Athonite pilgrim Sandu Tudor (who believed in "the workings of a mysterious miracle" as explanations for various events).

In his later columns for Gândirea, Crainic focused on explaining his ideal of ethnocracy in connection with the magazine's overall goals. This involved the denunciation of "foreign elements" and "minority islands", with a specific focus on the Jewish-Romanian community ("Jews make use of an indolent hospitality in order to deprive our kin of its ancient patrimony") and its alleged connections with the political establishment ("In statements, in speeches and in acts of government our democrats have always declared themselves on the side of intruders and the allogeneous"). According to Călinescu, Crainic, unlike the regime in Nazi Germany, was not condoning racism as much as religious antisemitism:

"For reasons of churchly policy, the race factor is averted and [Crainic] takes a stand against [racism in Nazi Germany] and those nationalists who advocate the elimination of Christianized Jews and deny them baptism. 'The Church is open to all'. Although it is not said outright, it is understood that a baptized Jew becomes a Romanian, Nation and Religion being correlated notions. [...] Gândirea has thus received plenty of rallied, that is to say Orthodoxized, Jews."

In parallel, around 1931, the magazine's approach to philosophy was criticized by the Personalist thinker Constantin Rădulescu-Motru, who deemed it "belletristic"; the traditionalist philosopher Mircea Vulcănescu, although himself only occasionally associated with Gândirea, defended Crainic's influence in front of the pragmatic conservative Junimist tradition arguably represented by Rădulescu-Motru inside the University of Bucharest. Writing in 1937, Crainic celebrated Gândirea's role in making nationalism and Orthodoxy priorities in Romania's intellectual and political life:

"The term 'ethnic' with its meaning of 'ethnic specificity' imprinted in all sorts of expressions of the people, as a mark of its original properties, has been spread for 16 years by the journal Gândirea. The same thing applies to the terms of autochthonism, traditionalism, Orthodoxy, spirituality and many more which became the shared values of our current nationalist language."

=== 1934 hiatus and recovery ===
A scandal erupted in 1934, when the magazine was closed down over Crainic's implication in the trial of Premier Ion G. Duca's assassins, all of them members of the fascist Iron Guard (a movement to which Crainic was close at the time). Instigation of the killing was attributed to, among others, Crainic, who faced trial; Gândirea, like Calendarul (his other major journal), was closed down by the authorities. The editor was eventually acquitted, but Calendarul was never allowed to resume print. Instead, Crainic focused his energy on issuing Sfarmă-Piatră.

Following its reemergence, Gândirea was again involved in a debate with Rădulescu-Motru. Among others, the latter contended that the Gândirist focus on Orthodoxy clashed with the traditional openness Romanian nationalism (which he referred to as Romanianism) had towards modernization, equating Crainic's thought with "xenophobia" and "nationalist patter". In response, Crainic accused Rădulescu-Motru of displaying "a Masonic aversion towards Orthodoxy", and of not having grasped the sense of spirituality (to the statement "Romanianism is a spirituality coming to justify a realist order", he replied "Any man knows that the word spirituality has a strictly religious meaning"). Later, he defined Rădulescu-Motru's thought as "militant philosophical atheism", and, in a Gândirea article of 1937, referred to him as a "philosophic simpleton [găgăuţ]".

As early as April 1933, Crainic wrote articles welcoming Adolf Hitler's rise to power in Germany, and began support for corporatist goals. Four years later, he authored a Gândirea article in which he praised Benito Mussolini and Italian fascism as the most adequate authoritarian alternative to positivism, materialism, capitalism and socialism alike:

"[Fascism is] a spiritual political concept [whose] manifestations, torn away from the tight circle of positivism and freed from the suffocating prison of materialism, fall into order on the ghostly marrow of history, prolonging themselves into the recess of past centuries and into the anticipations of the coming century. [...] A man bears there, under his vast dome-like forehead, our European century: Benito Mussolini. [...] The State created by Mussolini is the exemplary State. [...] Fascism is no longer capitalism, no longer socialism, but an authoritarian adjustment of every factor in production, geared into a social organism where nothing is left to chance. [...] More than any other country, Romania needs such a moral transformation in the depths of its soul [...] the spirit of a new Rome will suggest the shape of history destined to be created by a nationalist Romania."

This coincided with friendly relations between Crainic and the Italian Comitati d'azione per l'universalità di Roma (CAUR, the "Fascist International"), first evidenced in 1933–1934, at a time when Mussolini was undecided over the local political movement which was to attract his support. CAUR was planning to advance Crainic money to start a new publication, entirely dedicated to support for the Italian model, but the design was abandoned when Ugo Sola, the Italian ambassador in Bucharest, advised against it (Sola had been refused by the Iron Guard when approaching them with a similar proposal). As CAUR ended its all its relations with the Guard (who opted instead in favor of Nazi backing), it kept its contacts with Crainic and other less revolutionary-minded Romanian politicians — Mihail Manoilescu, Alexandru Averescu, Nicolae Iorga, Alexandru Vaida-Voevod, Octavian Goga and A. C. Cuza. In 1935, Crainic, who had been a vice president of Cuza's National-Christian Defense League, joined the fascist National Christian Party, but split with it after his ethnocratic ideal was dismissed by older party politicians (1937).

Writing in 1938 for his Porunca Vremii, Crainic argued:

"There exists authority based on love. The latter is Mussolini's authority over his people. It bursts out of the characteristic forces of the creative personality, like fire provoked by exploding bombs. Mussolini does not terrorize, for Mussolini does not kill. Mussolini attracts. [...] All his system is based on the fervent and unanimous adherence of his people."

=== Late 1930s polemics ===
After Emil Cioran published his The Transfiguration of Romania in 1937, Crainic reacted to the book's pro-totalitarian but overtly skeptic message, calling it "a bloody, merciless, massacre of today's Romania, without even [the fear] of matricide and sacrilege". To Cioran's support for modernization on a model which owed inspiration to both Nazi Germany and the Soviet Union, as well as to his criticism of Romanian traditions, Crainic replied by urging young people in general not to abandon "faith in our kin's rising century".

In early 1938, Nicolae Iorga, who had by then come into open conflict with the Iron Guard, voiced criticism of Cuvântul (a paper associated with the latter political movement), arguing that, despite an emphasis on traditionalism and localism, its ideological guidelines took direct inspiration from the foreign models of Nazism and Italian fascism. The dispute, involving, on the other side, Nae Ionescu, drew echoes in Gândirea — also challenged by Vulcănescu's argument that Gândirea had failed in their attempt to identify with Orthodoxy, Crainic polemized that Gândirism was in fact opposed to all forms of leftist and rightist internationalism (the "internationalist currents dominating our age"). At the time, publications headed by Ionescu and Crainic, despite maintaining separate visions on several core issues, showed equal support for a number of ideas (up to a certain point, Crainic was a direct influence on Ionescu). Iorga and Crainic had come to clash over Crainic's emphasis on religion (in front of Iorga's secularism), his political choices, as well as the few links Crainic still maintained with modernism.

Similar criticism of Crainic's political influence on Gândirea was voiced, in retrospect, by Pamfil Șeicaru (himself connected with the Iron Guard for part of his life). Șeicaru believed that the magazine aimed to adapt the influential ideas of Roman Catholic political activism (the Catholic Action) to an Orthodox environment: "[Crainic's] Orthodoxism was meant to facilitate the establishment of a party similar to the Democatholic ones". He also argued that

"A political-Orthodox movement crystallized inside a party is destined to be a vain attempt, no matter how much talent N. Crainic may have. And a political ambition is not enough in creating a large-scale social movement. Hence the deviation of Gândirea magazine from its initial impulse."

The magazine's articles featured accusations that Tudor Arghezi's group, together with others writers, was condoning "pornography", and Gândirea sided with Iorga's similar views on Arghezi's work. In this context, Crainic and his collaborators included antisemitic texts in Gândirea's columns. At the time, through the voice of Crainic, the magazine hailed Nazi Germany for having "immediately thrown over the border all Judaic pornographers and even those German writers infected with Judaism", and Fascist Italy for "immediately sanctioning a scabrous short story writer".

=== 1940s ===
Eventually, Crainic rallied with King Carol II's National Renaissance Front (FRN) and the authoritarian cabinet of Ion Gigurtu, inspiring the drafting antisemitic legislation, and being appointed to the leadership of the Propaganda Ministry. Despite the violent conflict between Carol and the Iron Guard, he continued to be ambivalent towards the latter, especially after the FRN was confronted with the Soviet occupation of Bessarabia and the Second Vienna Award; Crainic allowed its activists to broadcast their anthem on public radio, carrying on as minister during the World War II Iron Guard government (the National Legionary State).

In 1941, celebrating twenty years of existence, Gândirea hosted Crainic's thoughts on the "Jewish Question" and the new authoritarian and antisemitic regime of Ion Antonescu, which it had come to support:

"Throughout this time [...], Judaism was our most bitter enemy. Not an adversary, but an enemy [...]. Today, Judaism is vanquished. A splendid act of justice has suppressed [the left-wing publications] Adevărul, Dimineaţa and Lupta. The rest, it was only in 1940 that I could carry out when, as Minister of Propaganda, I extirpated all Jewish daily and weekly publications in Romania. The holy right of speaking in the name of Romanianism belongs now to Romanians exclusively. [...] There shall be no more artistic and cultural ideals where Judaism could dissimulate itself."

Following the recovery of Bessarabia during Operation Barbarossa, Gândirea joined the group of magazines that were blaming the territory's original loss on the Bessarabian Jewish community, while Crainic identified past and present Soviet policies with Judeo-Bolshevism.

=== Disestablishment and legacy ===
The magazine ceased publication in 1944, after the August 23 Coup overthrew Antonescu and the Soviet Red Army entered Romania (see Soviet occupation of Romania). In May 1945, Crainic was tried in absentia by a Communist Party-dominated People's Tribunal, as part of the "fascist journalists' group" (alongside Pamfil Șeicaru, Stelian Popescu, Grigore Manoilescu, and Radu Gyr). He was charged with instigating racial hatred, endorsing the war against the Soviet Union, and helping to keep secret the war crimes of the Antonescu regime. Found guilty, Crainic was sentenced to life imprisonment and hard labor (captured in 1947, he was to serve 15 years in the prisons of Communist Romania).

In a poll of 102 Romanian literary critics conducted in 2001 by the literary magazine Observator Cultural, the novel Craii de Curtea-Veche, written by Mateiu Caragiale and published in Gândirea in 1926–1927, was chosen "best Romanian novel of the twentieth century".
