= Valter Roman =

Romanian communist activist and soldier (1913–1983)

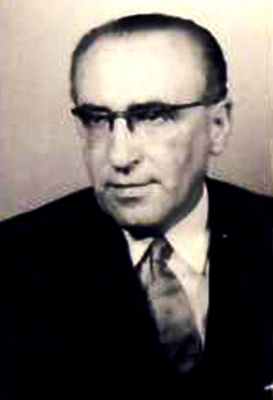
Valter Roman

Valter or Walter Roman (October 9, 1913 – November 11, 1983), born Ernst or Ernő Neuländer, was a Romanian communist activist and soldier. During his lifetime, Roman was active inside the Romanian, Czechoslovak, French, and Spanish Communist parties as well as being a Comintern cadre. He started his military career as a volunteer in the International Brigades during the Spanish Civil War, and rose to prominence in Communist Romania, as a high-level politician and military official.

Valter was the father of Petre Roman, a post-1989 politician, who served as Prime Minister.

== Biography ==
=== Early life ===
Born in Nagyvárad, Austria-Hungary Empire (today Oradea, Romania), he was the child of Jewish parents whose first language was Hungarian. In later testimonies, he indicated that his ethnic background was not entirely relevant to him: "Germans said I was a Hungarian, Hungarians that I was Romanian, Romanians said that I was Jewish, but Jews said I was a communist, although I was not yet one at the time".

Roman obtained a degree in electrical engineering in Brno, Czechoslovakia.

=== Military career ===
Initially active inside the PCR's agitprop section, he was a volunteer in a Romanian artillery unit of the International Brigades during the Spanish Civil War (see also Jewish volunteers in the Spanish Civil War) — according to one source, it was then that he first adopted the name Valter Roman, while also using the pseudonym G. Katowski. Wounded twice during combat, Roman eventually left for the Soviet Union.

In 1938–1941, Roman worked at a plane factory in Kalinin, later for one of the Comintern sections, and, during World War II, for an Institute for Scientific Research (1941–1945). During the period, he married Hortensia Vallejo, who was originally from Santander, Spain.

At the time, Roman also headed the Romanian-language radio station of the Comintern (România Liberă), broadcasting propaganda against the regime of Ion Antonescu and Romania's actions on the Eastern Front as an ally of Nazi Germany (see Romania during World War II). He returned to Soviet-occupied Romania in July 1945, as the political commissar for the Soviet-organized Horea, Cloșca și Crișan Division, commanded by General Mihail Lascăr.

Under the communist regime, Roman became a general in the People's Army (Major General after May 1, 1948) with political responsibilities (Chief of the Army Directorate for Education, Culture, and Propaganda, 1946; Chief of the Superior Political Direction of the Romanian Army and Chief of Staff, 1947–1951), and Minister of Telecommunications (March 29, 1951 – January 24, 1953). At the time, he declared himself in favor of recruiting a new military force "from the ranks of the working class, of the toiling peasantry and of the progressive intelligentsia".

Close to the Ana Pauker "Muscovite wing" of the PCR, he came into conflict with the party leadership around Gheorghe Gheorghiu-Dej. Initially removed from his Army position in 1950, at the same time as all cadres who had fought in the International Brigades or the French Resistance, Roman was deposed from government office, purged from the PCR and Army on charges of "Titoism" and "espionage", and singled out for a possible show trial (1952). He became subject to daily interrogations by the Party Control Commission.

Pressures on him were relaxed after the death of Joseph Stalin in 1953, and Roman became head of Editura Politică (1954–1983). He remained a suspect at a time when Gheorghiu-Dej felt increasingly threatened, was subject to a "vote of censure" in 1954, and was completely rehabilitated only in 1956.

=== Party leadership ===
In 1956 and 1957, as a high-ranking member of the Communist Party, Valter Roman was involved in deciding Romanian policies in regard to the Hungarian Revolution of 1956, which threatened to spark similar actions in Romania. He spent late October in Budapest, sending back reports which inflamed sentiments by presenting alleged revolutionary violence. After the Red Army invaded Hungary, he accompanied Gheorghiu-Dej, the writer Mihai Beniuc, and other local Communists to Budapest, where the three of them reviewed the situation and expressed approval of Soviet policies. Later on, he was involved in interrogating Imre Nagy during his detainment in Snagov, while also ensuring contacts between Nagy and Soviet officials. Nagy was returned to Hungary, secretly tried and executed. According to Fedor Burlatsky, Nikita Khrushchev had Nagy executed, "as a lesson to all other leaders in socialist countries."

An associate of Leonte Răutu, Roman seconded Emil Bodnăraş in the 1959 process of writing and compiling Party history, with a mission to highlight both Gheorghiu-Dej's role in the 1944 toppling of Ion Antonescu's regime and the insurrectional character of the coup.

In 1961, he was among the Party leaders who spoke out against Iosif Chişinevschi and other former leaders who had been since marginalized, such as Pauker (whom he accused of having maintained contacts with Soviet police chief Lavrentiy Beria), Boris Stefanov, and Lucreţiu Pătrăşcanu. He also rallied with Gheorghiu-Dej's positive views on de-Stalinization, claiming that Pauker's fall had been a sign of Romania parting with Stalinism. At the time, he argued that Pauker and her collaborator Vasile Luca had viewed him with suspicion based on his participation in the Spanish Civil War.

After Gheorghiu-Dej's death, he approved of the change in course indicated by Nicolae Ceauşescu, and joined in condemning the 1968 Soviet intervention in Czechoslovakia (at the time, he notably quoted Constantin Dobrogeanu-Gherea's statement that "socialism and truth are inseparable"). Elected to the Central Committee on July 24, 1965, he was in office until his death.

Decorated a Hero of the Socialist Labor, Roman was also employed as a University professor. By the 1970s, he was becoming opposed to the Ceauşescu leadership and questioned Leninism itself; a diary entry of 1975 shows that he resented the massive enrollment of obedient cadres into the PCR, and speculated that "when Lenin elaborated the concept of the new-type party he took inspiration from, he also thought of Ignacio de Loyola, of his «company of Jesus», of what it represented from the point of view of discipline, of obedience, hence there later emerged many negative consequences and, first of all, the deterioration of human character, of human integrity".

== Controversies ==
Several aspects of Roman's past remain under dispute.

In 2000, investigations by Russian historian Tofik Islamov concluded that, after Soviet authorities charged Maxim Litvinov to investigate the issue of Northern Transylvania, disputed between Romania and Hungary, Roman approached the commission in late 1944 with plans to have Transylvania declare itself independent (under a common guarantee from the Soviets and Western Allies). Petre Roman has repeatedly contested the conclusion, advancing documents which, he argued, proved that his father was in favor of Transylvania's status inside Romania.

In his own reply to Petre Roman's arguments, Islamov repeated his statements, and contended that views such as those attributed to Valter Roman were commonplace among internationalists of the time. He also cited Valter Roman's own 1944 statement — according to the document, Roman viewed both Hungary and Romania as guilty of waging war on the Soviet Union, arguing that the region (Transylvania) was "an ethnographic conglomerate" with a tradition of regional sovereignty, economic independence, and status as "the most progressive part of the country".

In 2006, Petre Roman was involved in a polemic with former Securitate chief and defector Ion Mihai Pacepa over the extent to which Valter Roman took part in political repression in the wake of the Hungarian Revolution.

== Works ==
=== Essays ===
- Revoluția industrială în dezvoltarea societății ("The Industrial Revolution in Social Development")
- Eseuri despre revoluția științifică și tehnică ("Essays on the Scientific and Technical Revolution")

=== Memoir ===
- Sub cerul Spaniei ("Under the Skies of Spain")

== Sources ==
- (in Romanian) Valter Roman's speech and subsequent exchange of replies with other Communist leaders (December 1961), at Sfera Politicii: Part I, Part II
- (in Spanish) "Roman llega hoy a Madrid para impulsar las relaciones entre España y Rumanía" ("Roman Arrives Today in Madrid to Revive Relations between Spain and Romania"), in El País, January 16, 1990
- (in Romanian) Final Report of the Presidential Commission for the Study of the Communist Dictatorship in Romania
- (in Romanian) Vartan Arachelian, "Falsificatorii" ("The Forgers"), in Ziua, August 23, 2005
- Adrian Cioroianu, Pe umerii lui Marx. O introducere în istoria comunismului românesc ("On the Shoulders of Marx. An Incursion into the History of Romanian Communism"), Editura Curtea Veche, Bucharest, 2005
- (in Romanian) Mirela Corlățan, "Elita militară: o epurare perfectă" ("The Military Elite: a Perfect Purge"), in Cotidianul, February 28, 2006
- (in Romanian) Tofik Islamov, "Scrisoare către Petre Roman" ("Letter to Petre Roman"), hosted by Provincia, August 19, 2000
- Robert Levy, Ana Pauker: The Rise and Fall of a Jewish Communist, University of California Press, Berkeley, 2001, ISBN 0-520-23747-1
- (in Romanian) Paula Mihailov, "Figuri moscovite ale comuniştilor români" ("Muscovite Figures of the Romanian Communists") in Jurnalul Național, February 28, 2007
- (in Romanian) Ion Mihai Pacepa, "Walter Roman - dedicat bolşevismului internaţional" ("Walter Roman - Dedicated to International Bolshevism"), in Ziua, September 8, 2006
- Vladimir Tismăneanu,
  - Gheorghiu-Dej and the Romanian Workers' Party: From De-Sovietization to the Emergence of National Communism (Working Paper No.37), Woodrow Wilson International Center for Scholars, Washington, D.C., 2002
  - Stalinism pentru eternitate, Polirom, Iaşi, 2005 ISBN 973-681-899-3 (translation of Stalinism for All Seasons: A Political History of Romanian Communism, University of California Press, Berkeley, 2003, ISBN 0-520-23747-1)
- (in Romanian) Cristina Vohn, "Transilvania, în planurile URSS" ("Transylvania in the USSR's Plans"), in Jurnalul Național, February 16, 2006
