= Vladimir Tismăneanu =

Romanian-American academic (born 1951)

- Born: July 4, 1951 (age 75); Brașov, Romania
- Occupations: Political scientist, political analyst, sociologist, professor
- Employer(s): University of Maryland, College Park
- Known for: Scholarly works on Stalinism, Romanian communism, and nationalism
- Parent(s): Leonte Tismăneanu, (Father), Hermina Marcusohn (Mother)

Vladimir Tismăneanu (Romanian pronunciation: [vladiˈmir tisməˈne̯anu]; born July 4, 1951) is a Romanian American political scientist, political analyst, sociologist, and professor at the University of Maryland, College Park. A specialist in political systems and comparative politics, he is director of the University of Maryland's Center for the Study of Post-Communist Societies, having served as chairman of the editorial committee (2004–2008) and editor (1998–2004) of the East European Politics and Societies academic review. Over the years, Tismăneanu has been a contributor to several periodicals, including Studia Politica, Journal of Democracy, Sfera Politicii, Revista 22, Evenimentul Zilei, Idei în Dialog and Cotidianul. He has also worked with the international radio stations Radio Free Europe and Deutsche Welle, and authored programs for the Romanian Television Company. As of 2009, he is Academic Council Chairman of the Institute for People's Studies, a think tank of the Romanian Democratic Liberal Party. Between February 2010 and May 2012, he was also President of the Scientific Council of the Institute for the Investigation of Communist Crimes in Romania.

Acclaimed for his scholarly works on Stalinism in general and the Romanian communist regime in particular, as well as for exploring the impact of nationalism, national communism and neo-Stalinism in the Soviet Union and countries of the Eastern Bloc, Tismăneanu writes from the critical perspective of a civil society supporter. His other influential texts deal with diverse topics such as Cold War history, Kremlinology and the Holocaust. Having moved from a loose Marxist vision, shaped under the influence of neo-Marxist and Western Marxist scholarship, he became a noted proponent of classical liberalism and liberal democracy. This perspective is outlined in both his scientific contributions and volumes dealing with Romania's post-1989 history, the latter of which include collections of essays and several published interviews with literary critic Mircea Mihăieș. Tismăneanu completed his award-winning synthesis on Romanian communism, titled Stalinism for All Seasons, in 2003.

Tismăneanu's background and work came under scrutiny after his 2006 appointment by Romanian president Traian Băsescu as head of the Presidential Commission for the Study of the Communist Dictatorship in Romania, which presented its report to the Romanian Parliament on December 18, 2006. There has been much controversy about the choice of Tismăneanu as commission president, about Tismăneanu's choices for commission members, and about the conclusions of the report.

== Biography ==
Born in Brașov, Vladimir Tismăneanu is the son of Leonte Tismăneanu, an activist of the Romanian Communist Party since the early 1930s, and Hermina Marcusohn, a physician and one-time Communist Party activist, both of whom were Jewish and Spanish Civil War veterans. His father, born in Bessarabia and settled in the Soviet Union at the end of the 1930s, worked in agitprop structures, returning to Romania at the end of World War II, and becoming, under the communist regime, chair of the Marxism-Leninism department of the University of Bucharest. Progressively after Gheorghe Gheorghiu-Dej acted against Ana Pauker, the Tismăneanus were sidelined inside the Romanian nomenklatura; in 1960, Leonte Tismăneanu was stripped of his position as deputy head of Editura Politică.

Vladimir Tismăneanu grew up in the exclusive Primăverii quarter of Bucharest. During his years of study at the Lyceum No. 24, which was then largely attended by students belonging to the nomenklatura, he was in the same year as Nicu Ceaușescu, son of communist leader Nicolae Ceaușescu, as well as the children of Leonte Răutu, Nicolae Doicaru, and Silviu Brucan.

In his preface to the Romanian-language edition of his 2003 book Stalinism for All Seasons, Tismăneanu indicated that, starting in 1970, he became interested in critiques of Marxism-Leninism and the Romanian communist regime in particular, after reading banned works made available to him by various of his acquaintances (among others, writer Dumitru Țepeneag and his wife, translator Mona Țepeneag, as well as Ileana, the daughter of Communist Party dignitary Gheorghe Gaston Marin). He stated that, at the time, he was influenced by Communism in Romania, an analytic and critical work by Romanian-born British political scientist Ghiță Ionescu, as well as by Marxist, Western Marxist, Democratic and Libertarian Socialist scholarship (among others, the ideas of Georg Lukács, Leszek Kołakowski, Leon Trotsky, Antonio Gramsci, and the Frankfurt School). According to Tismăneanu, his family background allowed him insight into the hidden aspects of Communist Party history, which was comparing with the ideological demands of the Ceaușescu regime, and especially with the latter's emphasis on nationalism.

He graduated as a valedictorian from the University of Bucharest's Faculty of Sociology in 1974, and received his Ph.D. from the same institution in 1980, presenting the thesis Teoria Critică a Școlii de la Frankfurt și radicalismul de stînga contemporan ("The Critical Theory of the Frankfurt School and Contemporary Left-Wing Radicalism"). During the period, he was received into the ranks of the Union of Communist Youth (UTC), authored several articles which displayed support for the regime, and, as vice-president of the UTC's Communist Student Association, allegedly took part in authoring and compiling propaganda aimed at students. He was also contributing to the UTC magazines Amfiteatru and Viața Studențească, where his essentially neo-Marxist essays were often mixed for publication with endorsements of the official ideology.

Between 1974 and 1981, Tismăneanu worked as a sociologist, employed by the Urban Sociology Department of the Institute Typified Buildings Design in Bucharest. Among his colleagues there were Alexandru Florian, Cătălin Mamali, Dumitru Sandu, Dorel Abraham, Radu Ioanid, Alin Teodorescu, and Mihai Milca. Tismăneanu was not given approval to hold an academic position. Around 1977, he was involved in a debate about the nature of Romanian culture, expressing a pro-European perspective in reaction to officially endorsed nationalism in general and, in particular, to the form of protochronism advocated by Edgar Papu and Luceafărul magazine. His thoughts on the matter, published by Amfiteatru alongside similar writings by Milca, Gheorghe Achiței, Alexandru Duțu, and Solomon Marcus.

In September 1981, a short while after the death of his father, he accompanied his mother on a voyage to Spain, after she had been granted a request to visit the sites where she and her husband had fought as young people. Unlike Hermina Tismăneanu, he opted not to return, and soon after left for Venezuela, before ultimately settling in the United States in 1982. During his time in Caracas, he was the recipient of a scholarship at the Contemporary Art Museum.

He lived first in Philadelphia, where he was employed by the Foreign Policy Research Institute (1983–1990), while teaching at the University of Pennsylvania (1985–1990). At the time, he began contributing comments on local politics to Radio Free Europe and Voice of America, beginning with an analysis of the "dynastic socialism" in Romania, centered on the political career of Nicu Ceaușescu. His essays on the lives and careers of communist potentates, requested by Radio Free Europe's Vlad Georgescu and aired by the station as a series, were later grouped under the title Archeology of Terror.

In 1990, Tismăneanu received a professorship at the University of Maryland, College Park and moved to Washington, D.C. He became editor of East European Politics and Societies in 1998, holding the position until 2004, when he became chair of its editorial committee. Between 1996 and 1999, he held a position on the Fulbright Program's Selection Committee for South-East Europe, and, from 1997 to 2003, was member of the Eastern Europe Committee at the American Council of Learned Societies. A fellow at the Institut für die Wissenschaften vom Menschen in Vienna, Austria and the New York University Erich Maria Remarque Institute (both in 2002), he was Public Policy Scholar at the Woodrow Wilson International Center for Scholars in 2001, returning as Fellow in 2005 and 2008–2009. Tismăneanu was also granted fellowship by Indiana University (Bloomington) (2003) and National Endowment for Democracy (2003–2004). The University of Maryland presented him with the award for excellence in teaching and mentorship (2001), the Distinguished Scholar Teacher Award (2003–2004), and the GRB Semester Research Award (2006). He received the Romanian-American Academy of Arts and Sciences's Prize for his 1998 volume Fantasies of Salvation: Democracy, Nationalism, and Myth in Post-Communist Europe and the 2003 Barbara Jelavich Award, presented by the American Association for the Advancement of Slavic Studies for his Stalinism for All Seasons. During the late 1990s, he collaborated with the German-based radio station Deutsche Welle, with a series of broadcasts, most of which he published in Romania as Scrisori din Washington ("Letters from Washington", 2002). He also worked as editor of Dorin Tudoran's Agora, a political journal of the Romanian diaspora.

Since the Romanian Revolution of 1989, he has been visiting his native country on a regular basis. Tismăneanu was in Bucharest during June 1990, witnessing the Mineriad, when miners from the Jiu Valley supporting the National Salvation Front put a violent stop to the Golani protest, an experience he claims gave him insight into "barbarity in its crassest, most revolting, form." Other sojourns included 1993-1994 research visits to the Communist Party archives, at the time supervised by the Romanian Army General Staff. Tismăneanu resumed his articles in the Romanian press, beginning with a series on communist leader Gheorghe Gheorghiu-Dej, which was published by the Writers' Union magazine România Literară during the early 1990s. He contributed a weekly column in Jurnalul Național, before moving to Cotidianul, and was regularly published by other press venues: Revista 22, Idei în Dialog, and Orizont. He later began contributing to Observator Cultural and Evenimentul Zilei.

Tismăneanu received the Romanian Cultural Foundation's award for the whole activity (2001), and was awarded Doctor honoris causa degrees by the West University of Timișoara (2002) and the SNSPA university in Bucharest. In its Romanian edition of 2005, Stalinism for All Seasons was a bestseller at Bookarest, the Romanian literary festival.

In 2006, Romanian president Traian Băsescu appointed him head of the Presidential Commission for the Study of the Communist Dictatorship in Romania, which presented its report to the Romanian Parliament in December of that year. As of 2009, Tismăneanu is also chairman of the academic board, Institute of People's Studies—an institution affiliated with the Democratic Liberal Party, which in turn is the main political group supportive of Băsescu's policies. The institution is presided upon by political scientist Andrei Țăranu. The following year, Tismăneanu was chosen by Democratic Liberal premier Emil Boc to lead, with Ioan Stanomir, the Institute for the Investigation of Communist Crimes in Romania, substituting the National Liberal Party's choice Marius Oprea. Tismăneanu was dismissed by the newly formed Victor Ponta government in May 2012.

Vladimir Tismăneanu is married to Mary Frances Sladek, and has fathered a son, Adam.

== Views and contributions ==
=== Overview ===
Vladimir Tismăneanu is one of the best-recognized contributors to modern-day political science in both the United States and Romania. Historian Cas Mudde referred to him as "one of the foremost American scholars on Eastern Europe", while Romanian literary critic and civil society activist Adrian Marino wrote: "The works of the political scientist Vladimir Tismăneanu, who owns a double cultural identity, American and Romanian, indicate a full-scale research agenda. His books are first rate, both in Romanian and in English .... They are representative of what has effectively shaped up nowadays into the Romanian political science .... When reading and studying Vladimir Tismăneanu, one enters a new realm, where, most importantly, one experiences a novel approach to writing. He rejects the usage of empty and inordinate formulae. He saves the characteristic Romanian creative writing, with its inconsistency and amorphousness, only for the literary trash bin. He sports a jaunty style, utterly lacking any inhibition or obsequiousness. ... His activity also fills a considerable void. It informs and it disseminates ideas. This is, undoubtedly, his fundamental virtue." According to historian Adrian Cioroianu, the insight provided to Tismăneanu by his family's oral history is "unique", amounting to "actual lessons in history, at a time when [it] was being Orwellianly processed by the [communist] system".

Sociologist Mihai Dinu Gheorghiu sees Tismăneanu and George Voicu as the two main contemporary Romanian sociologists to have "reconverted [to political science] while preserving a rather symbolic link with sociology". At the end of this process, he argues, Tismăneanu "has enjoyed the greatest authority in his field in Romania", while, according to critic Livius Ciocârlie: "Not so long ago, to the question of who is the greatest Romanian politologist, any other politologist would reply that there is only one possible answer: Vladimir Tismăneanu."

According to Vasile, Tismăneanu's contribution, like those of historians Katherine Verdery and Catherine Durandin, is being purposefully ignored by some Romanian academics, who object to their exposure of national communism. Vasile nominates such figures as "the pernicious and not altogether innocent continuity" of Communist Romania. In contrast, Tismăneanu was a direct influence on the first post-Revolution generation of political scientists and historians. Vasile credits his colleague with having influenced "an entire generation of young researchers of Romania's recent history." As one of them, Cioroianu, writes: "quite a lot of us in the field of historical-social analysis in this country have emerged from underneath Vl[adimir] Tismăneanu's cloak". In Cioroianu's definition, the group includes himself, alongside Stelian Tănase, Mircea Mihăieș, Marius Oprea, Stejărel Olaru, Dan Pavel, Dragoș Petrescu and others. The same author notes that his predecessor had an early and important contribution, equivalent to a "generative enlightenment", by presenting younger researchers with a detailed account of previously obscured phenomena and events. Most of Tismăneanu's works have English and Romanian-language editions, and books of his were translated into Polish, Lithuanian, and Ukrainian.

In addition to his analytic contribution, Vladimir Tismăneanu earned praise for his literary style. Romanian critics, including Tismăneanu's friend, philosopher Horia-Roman Patapievici, admire his "passionate" writing. Essayist and România Literară reviewer Tudorel Urian, who contrasts Tismăneanu with what he sees as the regular "self-styled 'analysts' [who] abdicate logic and common sense", opines: "The American professor's articles impress by their very solid theoretical structure, by their always effective argumentation, by their author's correct positioning in relation to the facts invoked ... and, not least of all, by the elegance of their style. In the world of contemporary politology, Vladimir Tismăneanu is an erudite, doubled by an artist, and his texts are a delight for the reader." According to Tismăneanu's fellow Commission member, historian and political scientist Cristian Vasile, such perspectives are especially true for the choice of "piercing epithets" defining persons or phenomena discussed in his works. Literary critic Mircea Iorgulescu notes in particular the many nocturnal and ghostly metaphors used by Tismăneanu in reference to totalitarianism, proposing that these reflect "perfectly natural psychoanalytical suggestions, for wherever there are ghosts, there are also neuroses, or, at the very least, obsessions."

=== Early works ===
Tismăneanu began his writing career as a dissenting Marxist, sympathizing with the intellectual currents known collectively as neo-Marxism. His doctoral thesis was cited as evidence that Tismăneanu was "a liberal student of Euro-Marxism" by University of Bucharest professor Daniel Barbu (who contrasted Tismăneanu with the official ideological background of Communist Romania, as one in a group of "outstanding authors", alongside Pavel Câmpeanu, Henri H. Stahl, Zigu Ornea, and Vlad Georgescu). Tismăneanu also states having been influenced by psychoanalysis, the Frankfurt School and Existentialism, and, from among the Marxist authors he had read at that stage, he cites as his early mentors Antonio Gramsci, Georg Lukács, Herbert Marcuse, and Jean-Paul Sartre.

According to Marino: "Some label [Tismăneanu] as 'Marxist anti-communist'. I'd rather say he used to be one. It seems remarkable to me the manner in which he achieves a freedom of spirit, lucidly and sharply applied to his present critique." Cristian Vasile places the author's "decisive split" with Marxism in the 1980s, during the Radio Free Europe years, while political scientist and critic Ioan Stanomir defines him as a "liberal-conservative spirit". American scholar Steven Fish writes:

[Tismăneanu] is animated by a passionate liberal spirit, albeit one of a particular type. [His] liberalism is less intimately akin to that of John Locke or Robert Nozick, or L. T. Hobhouse or John Rawls, than it is to that of Isaiah Berlin and, less proximately, John Stuart Mill. Tismăneanu shares with Berlin and Mill an uncompromising commitment to pluralism as the highest political value; a celebration of difference, nonconformity, and tolerance; a deep skepticism concerning ultimate solutions, political blueprints, and unequivocal policy prescriptions; and a wariness regarding the subtler danger of majoritarian authoritarianism.

Tismăneanu himself discusses the personal transition:

Originating as I was from the milieu of illegalists [that is, communists active in the pre-1944 underground], ... I discovered early on the contrast between the official legends and the various fragments of subjective truths as they revealed themselves in private conversations, syncopated confessions and biting ironies. I was also discovering a theme which was to puzzle me throughout my professional career: the relation between communism, fascism, anti-communism and anti-fascism; in short, I was growing aware that, as has been demonstrated by François Furet, the relationship between the two totalitarian movements, viscerally hostile to the values and institutions of liberal democracy, was the fundamental historical issue of the 20th century.

He credits Ghiță Ionescu, noted historian of Romanian communism, as his "mentor and model."

In her review of The Crisis of Marxist Ideology in Eastern Europe, political analyst Juliana Geran Pilon calls Tismăneanu's book "the best analysis of Marxist philosophy since Leszek Kołakowski's monumental trilogy Main Currents of Marxism." The work is Tismăneanu's study into the avatars of Marxism within the Eastern Bloc, and a contribution to both Kremlinology and Cold War studies. It proposes that the Soviet Union's policies of Perestroika and Glasnost masked an ideological crisis, and that the Bloc's regimes had reached a "post-totalitarian" stage, where repression was "more refined, less obvious, but by no means less effective". He criticizes Marxist opponents of Soviet-style communism for giving in to the ideological allure, and proposes that, although appearing reform-minded, Soviet leader Mikhail Gorbachev was, in effect, a "neo-Stalinist".

The 1990 collection In Search of Civil Society: Independent Peace Movements in the Soviet Bloc is structured around the transformation of the peace movements into anti-communist and dissident forces in the Soviet Union, the People's Republic of Hungary, the People's Republic of Poland, the Czechoslovak Socialist Republic and East Germany. It notably includes articles by two participants in such movements, Hungary's Miklós Haraszti and Russia's Eduard Kuznetsov. American University reviewer Laszlo Kürti called the volume "a milestone that will remain on reading lists for many years to come", but criticized Tismăneanu for not explaining neither the end of such movements nor their absence from other countries. Writing in 1999, scholar Gillian Wylie noted that, with In Search of Civil Society, Tismăneanu was one of the "few academics beyond those involved in the peace activist community" to have dealt with the topic of peace movements in Warsaw Pact countries.

=== Arheologia terorii and Reinventing Politics ===
With 1992's Romanian-published Arheologia terorii ("The Archeology of Terror"), which reunited the Radio Free Europe essays of the 1980s, Tismăneanu was focusing Romania's communism, in an attempt to identify what set apart from the experience of other Eastern Bloc countries. Cristian Vasile believes it to have been, at the time of its publishing, "one of the few researches on the Romanian communist elite to include prosopographic nuances." Among this group of essays, historian Bogdan Cristian Iacob singles out one dedicated to chief ideologist Leonte Răutu, the so-called "Romanian Zhdanov", as purportedly the first ever analytical writing dedicated to his career.

Much of the text focuses on Romania's dissidents after the start of De-Stalinization, and the peculiarities of this process in Romania. Tismăneanu notes how communist leader Gheorghe Gheorghiu-Dej, whose dictatorial rule of the 1950s and early 1960s preceded and survived the start of De-Stalinization, was able to exert control over the local intelligentsia even as civil society and nonviolent resistance movements were being created in other parts of the Bloc. It is also noted for its treatment of Gheorghiu-Dej's successor, Nicolae Ceaușescu, who associated himself with a message of liberalization and nationalist revival, and who made a point of opposing the 1968 Soviet-led invasion of Czechoslovakia. This gesture, Arheologia terorii argues, was in actuality Ceaușescu's attempt to ideologically legitimize his grip on Romanian society. In his review of the book, literary critic Ion Bogdan Lefter concludes: "One finds here, in the subtext, the premises for an extended debate on themes related to the philosophy of history: what are, in reality, the effective relations between the collective destiny of a community and the destinies of individuals who compose it? ... The [book's] answers are ... shattering. Looking back into the communist regime's back stages ... one finds not the faithful prophets of a utopia, but the morass of disgusting spiritual filth—and one cannot but be horrified by seeing who has been entrusted with the destiny of an entire people".

With the 1994 book Reinventing Politics, the Romanian author looked into the European revolutions of the previous decade, exploring the shades of repression, the differences in political culture, and how they related to the fall of communism in various countries. Calling it "a significant contribution", New School sociologist Jeffrey C. Goldfarb argues: "Tismăneanu is very good at ordering the often confusing details of what he calls 'the birth pangs of democracy.' " Goldfarb objects to the text being "long on historical detail and short on social theory", arguing that: "As a result, [his] attempts at generalization often miss the mark." According to Goldfarb, although Reinventing Politics cautions that the former communist societies risked folding into nationalism, xenophobia and antisemitism, its author "does not provide a clear sense of how [this] can be avoided." Goldfarb contends that, while the book expresses support for embarking on the road to an "open society", it fails to explain how the goal is supposed to be reached. In his review of a 2007 reprint, Romanian cultural historian Cristian Cercel comments on Vladimir Tismăneanu's belief in politics being "reinvented", which implied that power in former communist countries could be shifted to "the powerless" by following the example of Czechoslovak writer and activist Václav Havel. Cercel, who sees this as proof of "well-balanced idealism", writes: "Instead of an absolute critical distance, Tismăneanu presents us with a critical engagement at the core of the problem."

=== From Irepetabilul trecut to Balul mascat ===
The volume of essays Irepetabilul trecut ("The Unrepeatable Past") also saw print in 1994, and largely dealt with post-communist Romanian history. Bogdan Cristian Iacob describes it as "an expression of the priorities of those years, from the perspective of democratization and civil society consolidation" coupled with "a working site of ideas" for later works. The volume, Iacob notes, is structured as a typical work on the history of ideas, and, with "beneficent obstinacy", builds on Tismăneanu's "principal themes". In Iacob's view, "the most important" are: "the basic criminality of Bolshevism in any of its incarnations; the attachment to civic liberalism modeled on the experience of Central and Eastern European dissidence; the totalitarian past's reclamation ...; the research into Romania's communist experience; and, not least of all, the local environment's epistemic synchronization with debates in the Anglo-Saxon space." Under the influence of Jürgen Habermas and Karl Jaspers, the text proposes that social cohesion is only made possible by the common recognition of past evils around the idea of justice (see Historikerstreit). In particular, the essays reject the policies of Romania's major post-communist left-wing group, the National Salvation Front and those of its successor, the Social Democratic Party (PSD), arguing that their policies were a political hybrid designed to block the path of genuinely anti-communist liberalism. Irepetabilul trecut was the first such work to be noted for its biographical sketches of communist leaders.

In 1995, Tismăneanu was again focusing on Gheorghiu-Dej, analyzing the part he played in both the violent communization of the 1950s and the adoption of nationalism in the 1960s. This investigation produced the Romanian-language volume Fantoma lui Gheorghiu-Dej ("Gheorghiu-Dej's Ghost"), expanding on a similarly titled chapter in Irepetabilul trecut. It notably theorizes a difference between national communism and the "national Stalinism" suiting both Gheorghiu-Dej and his successor Ceaușescu. The question "What is left of Gheorghiu-Dej's experiment?", is answered by Tismăneanu as follows: "An inept and frightened elite, whose social mobility was linked to the nationalist-chauvinist line promoted by Ceaușescu. A sectarian and exclusive vision of socialism, a political style based on terror, manipulation and liquidating one's enemy. An unbound contempt for the spirit and a no less total conviction that humans are a mere maneuverable mass .... But most of all ... an immense scorn for principles, a trampling of all things dignified and honorable, a mental and moral corruption that continues to ravage this social universe that is still being haunted by the ghosts of national Stalinism." The text characterized the dictator himself as a figure who "had managed to unify within his style Jesuitism and lack of principles, opportunism and cruelty, fanaticism and duplicity."

Historian Lucian Boia highlights the clash between such a vision and that of a patriotic, liberal and congenial Gheorghiu-Dej, retrospectively advanced in the 1990s by some of the leader's collaborators, among them Alexandru Bârlădeanu, Silviu Brucan and Ion Gheorghe Maurer. Boia writes: "In between Bârlădeanu and Tismăneanu, may we be allowed to prefer the latter's interpretation. ... oblivion is not what we owe [Gheorghiu-Dej], but condemnation, be it moral and posthumous." Vladimir Tismăneanu's reflections on a self-legitimizing, "Byzantine", discourse in Romanian communism, Ioan Stanomir notes, were also being applied by Tismăneanu to the post-Revolution President of Romania, former Communist Party activist and PSD leader Ion Iliescu, who, both argued, did not represent an anti-communist social democracy, but a partial return to Gheorghiu-Dej's legacy.

Also in 1995, Tismăneanu published a collection of essays, Noaptea totalitară ("The Totalitarian Night"). It includes his reflections on the emergence of totalitarian regimes throughout the world, as well as more thoughts on Romania's post-1989 history. Writing in 2004, Ion Bogdan Lefter described it as the embryo of later works: "The author moves with essay-like dexterity from the concrete level, of history 'in movement', to the general, that of political philosophies and great 'societal' models, from biographic narrative to the evolution of systems, from anecdote to mentalities. ... From [such] reflections ... emerged Tismăneanu's studies on 20th century ideological and political history, and his articles on Romanian subjects have prepared and accompanied the completion of his recent synthesis [Stalinism for All Seasons]."

Balul mascat ("The Masquerade Ball", 1996), was Vladimir Tismăneanu's first book of conversations with Mircea Mihăieș, specifically dealing with political life in Romania's post-1989 evolution and on its relation to the European Union integration process. Tudorel Urian describes the volume and its successors in the series, all of them published at the end of electoral cycles, as "a most reliable indicator of tendencies", and to the authors as "important intellectuals of our age." Urian writes: "Although, at the time when these volumes were published, not everyone was pleased by the precise X-rays to which Vladimir Tismăneanu and Mircea Mihăieș subjected [Romania's politics], excessively vocal counterarguments were never produced. The distance (not just in kilometers) between Washington and Bucharest, the superior analytic accuracy, Professor Tismăneanu's international scientific prestige, the almost exclusive use of readily available sources ..., the democratic values at the core of the interpretations (ones which no honorable political actor could afford to contest publicly) have given these books a considerable dose of credibility ...."

=== Fantasies of Salvation ===
With Fantasies of Salvation, published in 1998, Vladimir Tismăneanu focuses on the resurgence of authoritarian, ethnocratic, demagogic and anti-capitalist tendencies in the political cultures of Post-Communism. The text, which is both a historical survey and a political essay, argues: "As the Leninist authoritarian order collapsed, societies have tended to be atomized and deprived of a political center able to articulate coherent visions of a common good." This process, he argues, favors the recourse to "mythology", and paradoxical situations such as a post-Holocaust antisemitism in the absence of sizable Jewish communities. He also focuses on the revived antisemitic conspiracy theory according to which Jews had played a leading role in setting up communist regimes (see Jewish Bolshevism).

Tismăneanu thus sees the political elites and the authoritarian side of the intelligentsia as responsible for manipulating public opinion and "rewriting (or cleansing) of history in terms of self-serving, present-oriented interests". He writes in support of the critical intelligentsia and former dissidents, whom he sees as responsible for resistance to both communism and the far right. Part of the volume deals with "the myth of decommunization", signifying the manner in which local elites may take hold of political discourse and proclaim lustration. Although he disagrees with the contrary notion of collective responsibility and sees calls for justice as legitimate, he notes that the special laws targeting communist officials may pose a threat to society.

Steven Fish calls the book "a major contribution to our understanding of the postcommunist political predicament" which "will stand the test of time", noting its "searching treatment of the connection between intellectual and political life", "incorporation of cultural conflict into the analysis of politics", "unabashed humanism" and "lyrical style", all of which, he argues, parallel works by Isaiah Berlin and Fouad Ajami. However, he criticizes Tismăneanu for his "not strictly correct" conclusion that intellectual former dissidents can be credited with bringing down communism and reforming their countries, replying that the "rough-hewn politicians" Lech Wałęsa and Boris Yeltsin, and the Bulgarian "pragmatic liberal centrist" Ivan Kostov, are just as important actors. A similar point is made by Cas Mudde, who contends that Tismăneanu's words display "passionate and uncritical support for the dissidents", adding: "For someone so worried about populism, it is remarkable that he does not see the clearly populist elements of the dissidents' 'anti-politics', which he so often praises." Political scientist Steven Saxonberg reserves praise for the manner in which Fantasies of Salvation is written, but objects to Tismăneanu's preference for market liberalism at the expense of any form of collectivism, and claims that his focus on new antisemitic trends overlooks the revival of antiziganism. Researchers comment favorably Tismăneanu's rejection of cultural determinism in discussing the Eastern Bloc countries' relation to the Western world and to each other.

As editor of the 1999 collection of essays The Revolutions of 1989 (Re-Writing Histories) (with contributions by Kołakowski and Daniel Chirot), Vladimir Tismăneanu was deemed by British historian Geoffrey Swain an "obvious choice to assemble the contributors." Swain, who called his preface "excellent", states: "It is difficult to argue with [Tismăneanu's] notion that 'these revolutions represented the triumph of civic dignity and political morality over ideological monism, bureaucratic cynicism and police dictatorship'." However, he disapproves of the author's decision to treat all bloc countries as if they were still a single entity: "What made historians address the diverse countries of Eastern Europe as a common unit was communism; with its collapse the logic for such an approach disappeared. ... The book works when a common approach works, and fails when a common approach fails." Between Past and Future. The Revolutions of 1989 and Their Aftermath, a 2000 collection published in collaboration with Sorin Antohi, Timothy Garton Ash, Adam Michnik, Radim Palouš, and Haraszti, is another overview of the dissidents' contribution to the end of communism.

=== Încet spre Europa and Scrisori din Washington ===
His second book of conversations with Mihăieș, titled Încet spre Europa ("Slowly toward Europe", 2000), touches on various subjects in Romanian society and world politics. Much of it deals with the events of 2000, in particular the country's management by the right-wing Romanian Democratic Convention. According to historian Victor Neumann, "[The book] suggests the measure to which the public debate needs to be fundamental in educating the elite and the public at large, in structuring civil society and in promoting an articulate discourse for the rejection of extremist political orientations. However, it also shows how such debates have not yet found the right framework or the institutions to promote it. Responsibility for the delay of [social and economic] reforms is not placed on not just the—as yet invertebrate—political class, but also on the cultural milieus and the media, which favor sterile discussions, world play, obsolete ideologies." He also notes: "The dialogue between Vladimir Tismăneanu and Mircea Mihăieș demonstrates the role of analysis and confrontation of ideas over hasty judgment or temperamental criticism, providing in the end an image as unembellished as possible. [It] places a magnifier over high-ranking institutions such as the Presidency, the Orthodox Church, the school. The observations are always based on knowledge of the facts."

Part of the volume focuses on the Holocaust, Holocaust denial, and Romania's responsibility, discussing them in relation with Stéphane Courtois' Black Book of Communism. Like Alan S. Rosembaum's Is the Holocaust Unique?, Încet spre Europa uses the polemical term "comparative martyrology" on comparisons made between the Holocaust and the Gulag (or other forms of communist repression). Although he agrees that communism is innately genocidal, Tismăneanu views the latter claims as attempts to trivialize the Holocaust. He also criticizes some versions of historical revisionism which, he argues, make it seem like the victims of communism were all "friends of democracy" and "adherents to classical liberalism", but agrees that: "The manner in which communism dealt with [its victims] is utterly illegal and this needs to be emphasized." Tismăneanu, who theorizes a "very complicated, bizarre, perverse, and well-camouflaged" relationship between communism and fascism, preserved in both national communism and the political discourse of post-communist Romania, also argues: "Romania will not un-fascify until it decommunizes, and will decommunize until it un-fascifies." Such conclusions were also present in the Spectrele Europei Centrale ("The Specters of Central Europe", 2001), where he notably argues that the popularity of fascist ideology within the defunct Kingdom of Romania was exploited by the communist regime, leading to what he calls a "baroque synthesis" of extremes (an idea later expanded upon by essayist Caius Dobrescu).

With 2002's Scrisori din Washington, Tismăneanu constructs a retrospective overview of the 20th century, which he sees as dominated by the supremacy of communism and fascism. Structured around reviewed Deutsche Welle broadcasts, it also includes short texts on diverse subjects, such as essays about Marxist resistance to established communism, an analysis of the Western far right, conclusions about the Kosovo War, a debate around the political ideas of interwar novelist Panait Istrati, and praises of the Romanian intellectuals Virgil Ierunca and Dan Pavel. Mircea Iorgulescu criticizes the work for not discussing other relevant phenomena (such as the successes of feminism, decolonization and the environmental movement), and argues that many of the pieces seem American-centered, unfocused or outdated. Iorgulescu also objects to the book's verdict on Istrati's political choices after his split with communism, claiming that Tismăneanu is wrong in assuming that Istrati eventually moved to the far right. He nevertheless argues: "[the book] provides an impressive image of the extraordinary American effort to research, analyze and interpret communism and post-communism." Iorgulescu, who views Tismăneanu as a Romanian equivalent to Michnik, adds: "The circumstance of his living in the United States ... protects him, for it is not hard to imagine how one would have viewed and behaved toward a Romanian from Romania who has the courage to speak, for instance, about the existence of an anti-Bolshevik Bolshevism. Being himself a critical intellectual, one would understand the origin of his continuous plea for [the intellectual critics] always hunted down by the authoritarian regimes."

=== Stalinism for All Seasons ===
With Stalinism for All Seasons, Tismăneanu provides a synthesis of his views on Communist Romanian history leading back to Arheologia terorii, documenting the Romanian Communist Party's evolution from the Bolshevik wing of the Socialist Party to the establishment of a one-party state. Tismăneanu himself, reflecting on the purpose of the book, stated his vision of communism as an "eschatological" movement, adding: "Romanian communism was a subspecies of Bolshevik radicalism, itself born out of an engagement between Russian revolutionary tradition and the voluntarist version of Marxism." Adrian Cioroianu notes that "Tismăneanu was the first who could ever explain the mirage and the motivation [felt by] Romania's first communists of the '20-'30 decade." The focus on communist conspiracies and inner-Party struggles for power is constant throughout the book. In a 2004 review published by Foreign Affairs magazine, political scientist Robert Legvold sees it as "less a political history of communism than it is a thorough account of leadership battles in the Romanian Communist Party from its origins at the turn of the nineteenth century to its demise in 1989." Also according to Legvold, the author "shed[s] light on the paradoxes of Romanian communism: how a pariah party that was Stalinist to the core eventually turned on its Soviet master and embraced nationalism—how 'national Stalinism' was acceptable to the West as long as it meant autonomy from [the Soviet Union]. That is, until it became grotesque in Nicolae Ceaușescu's last decade, leading to the regime's violent death."

The book title is a direct allusion to Robert Bolt's play A Man for All Seasons. It refers to an idea discussed in previous works, that of Romania's special case: Stalinism preserved after the death of Joseph Stalin, and returning in full swing during the Ceaușescu years. Noting the role played by party purges in this process, Cioroianu stresses: "Tismăneanu was the first to ever suggest that between the communists of the '30s and those of the '60s one could hardly determine a correspondence, even if the names of some—the lucky ones!—crop up from one period and into the other." Ion Bogdan Lefter notes that it is "paradoxical—in that it is the first American book that Vladimir Tismăneanu dedicated to the subject he was most familiar with." Lefter writes that the idea of "perpetual Romanian Stalinism" is backed by "a weighty demonstration", but is reserved toward the statements according to which Ceaușescu's early "small liberalization" of the 1960s was inconsequential, arguing that, even though "Re-Stalinization" occurred with the April Theses of 1971, "[the regime] could never overturn [the phenomenon] altogether, some of its effects being preserved—at least in part—until 1989." Lefter proposes a more in-depth analysis of this situation, based on the methodology of historiography introduced by the Annales School, which, he argues, would allow more room for "small personal histories".

Initially, Vladimir Tismăneanu had planned to write a review of Romanian history covering the entire modern period, before deciding to concentrate on a more limited subject. Part of the volume relies on never-before published documents to which he had gained access as a young man, through his family connections. It also incorporates his thoughts on the communist legacy in Romania, and in particular his belief that the modified communist dogma endured as a force in Romanian politics even during the post-1989 period. Cioroianu reviews the high praise earned by the volume throughout the Romanian intellectual and educational environments, as "all the appreciations a history volume could have expected". American historian Robert C. Tucker calls it "the definitive work on Romanian communism", and Stanomir "a monument of erudition and laconicism".

=== Democrație și memorie and Cortina de ceață ===
The 2004 volume of essays, Scopul și mijloacele ("The Purpose and the Means") is largely an expansion of Noaptea totalitară. It was followed in 2006 by a collection of his press articles, carrying the title Democrație și memorie ("Democracy and Memory"), which centers on admiring portraits: those of thinkers, politicians or activists whom he credits with having provided him with an understanding of political phenomenons—Raymond Aron, Robert Conquest, Arthur Koestler, Jacek Kuroń, Czesław Miłosz, Susan Sontag, Alexander Nikolaevich Yakovlev—and those of Cold War figures such as US President Ronald Reagan and Pope John Paul II. The book also included his earlier calls to have the Securitate archives, then managed by the Romanian Intelligence Service, opened for the public, in the belief that liberal democracy has transparency as its prerequisite. Other segments of the book voiced calls for a public debate on the moral legacy of communism, and for the assumption of the "democratic ethos" by regular Romanians.

A third volume of Mihăieș-Tismăneanu dialogues was published in 2007, as Cortina de ceață ("The Fog Curtain"). According to Tudorel Urian, it is directly linked to its author's involvement in political disputes, and in particular those created around the Presidential Commission for the Study of the Communist Dictatorship in Romania. Therefore, Urian says, it "has a more accentuated polemic character, the two of them being often required to reply to the attacks on them." The volume's title is Tismăneanu's definition of political scandals and supposed media manipulation in Romania, and the book includes commentary on such events as the arrival to power and eventual breakup of the Justice and Truth alliance; the National Anticorruption Directorate's inquiry into the activities of former premier Adrian Năstase and other PSD leaders; the revelations that Chamber representative Mona Muscă and Tismăneanu's own colleague Sorin Antohi had been informants of Communist Romania's secret police, the Securitate; and criticism of the commission itself. The book expresses its author's support for the political agenda of Romanian President Traian Băsescu, impeached by Parliament and reinstated by an April 2007 referendum. Urian writes: "supporters of [Băsescu's] agenda will be enthusiastic about the book, and those who reject it will be searching for flaws under a microscope. All shall nevertheless have to read very carefully. This is because, beyond the generic, predictable, direction, it is rich in punctual analyses of a great finesse and in information too easily lost in the daily turmoil, but which, once brought to memory, may render things in a new light."

=== Refuzul de a uita and Perfectul acrobat ===
Points similar to those made by Cortina de ceață were present in another 2007 book, Refuzul de a uita ("Refusing to Forget"). A collection of scattered articles, it also partly responds to criticism of the commission. Alongside such pieces stand essays which expand on earlier subjects: portraits of various intellectuals admired by the author (Michnik, Kołakowski, Jeane Kirkpatrick, Vasile Paraschiv, Jean-François Revel, Andrei Sakharov, Aleksandr Zinovyev); reflections on populism, with case studies of Hugo Chávez's Venezuela and Slobodan Milošević's Yugoslavia; and a posthumous critique of political analyst and former communist activist Silviu Brucan. A section of the volume refers to the controversy surrounding journalist Carol Sebastian, exposed as a Securitate informant after a career in the anti-communist press. Tismăneanu contrasts Sebastian with open supporters of the Ceaușescu regime, grouped around Săptămîna magazine during the 1970s and never exposed in such a manner, and concludes that Sebastian's case stands as "a warning that we must as soon as possible progress to the condemnation of the institutions who have made possible such tragic moral collapses."

With the 2008 volume Perfectul acrobat ("The Perfect Acrobat"), co-authored with Cristian Vasile, Tismăneanu returned to his study of Leonte Răutu, and, in general, to the study of links between Communist Romania's ideological, censorship and propaganda apparatuses. The book, subtitled Leonte Răutu, măștile răului ("Leonte Răutu, the Masks of Evil"), also comments on the motivations of writers in varying degrees of collaboration with the communist structures: Tudor Arghezi, George Călinescu, Ovid Crohmălniceanu, Petru Dumitriu, Paul Georgescu, Eugen Jebeleanu, and Miron-Radu Paraschivescu. It attempts to explain in detail how the regime resisted genuine De-Stalinization without meeting many public objections from the leftist intellectuals, a situation defined by Bogdan Cristian Iacob as "the painful absence of an alternative, of an anti-systemic tradition." Răutu's high-ranking career and overall guidelines, both of which survived all changes in the system under Gheorghiu-Dej and Ceaușescu, are taken by the authors as study cases in Romania's post-Stalinist Stalinism. In addition, Iacob notes, "the two authors bring forth irrefutable proof for the unshakable link between word and power in communism". He cites Răutu's own theories about the role education and agitprop had in creating the "New Man". Tismăneanu, who deems Răutu "the demiurge of the infernal system to crush the autonomy of thought in communized Romania", lists the creation of a New Man among the ideologue's main goals, alongside the atomization, mobilization, and homogenization of his target audience. According to Stanomir, "the biographical examination ... gives birth to a narrative on the rise and fall of a modern possessed man", while the documents presented reveal Răutu's willingness to show fidelity to all policies and all successive leaders, in what is "more than a survival strategy." For Stanomir, the ideologist as Tismăneanu and Vasile show him is a man who replicates religious belief, guided by the principle that "outside the Party there can be no salvation" (see Extra Ecclesiam nulla salus). In its introductory section, Perfectul acrobat includes a dialogue of the two authors with a first-hand witness to Răutu's actions, philosopher Mihai Șora. This piece, coupled with a final documentary section, are rated by Stanomir as "outstandingly innovative ... at the intersection of intellectual discourse, testimonial and the document itself."

=== Other contributions ===
Outside the realms of history, political science and political analysis, Vladimir Tismăneanu is a noted author of memoirs. This part of his work is centered on the volume Ghilotina de scrum ("The Ashen Guillotine"), also written on the basis of interviews with Mihăieș. The book offers an account of his complicating relationship with Leonte Tismăneanu, postulating a difference between the everyday father, who has earned his son's admiration for being marginalized by his political adversaries, and a "political father", whose attitudes and public actions are rejected by Vladimir Tismăneanu.

This approach earned praise from two influential intellectual figures of the Romanian diaspora, critics Monica Lovinescu and Virgil Ierunca, whose letter to the author read: "the distances you take from your own background are of most-rare authenticity and tact. You accomplish a radical break, being at the same time participative, negating things only after you have understood them, being dissociated from both roles of judge and defense counsel." Cioroianu also notes: "He is not the only son of (relatively) well-known communists; but he is one of the few to have reached the level of detachment needed in order to X-ray, in a cold and precise way, a political system. Does this seem easy to you? I do not know how many of us would be capable of introspecting with such lucidity our own parents' utopias, phantasms and disappointments". The historian opposes Tismăneanu's approach to that of Petre Roman, Romania-s first post-1989 Premier, whose attempts at discussing the public image of his father, the communist politico Valter Roman, are argued by Cioroianu to have "failed".

Tismăneanu has contributed the screenplay for Dinu Tănase's documentary film Condamnați la fericire ("Sentenced to Happiness"), released in 1992. With Octavian Șerban, he has also authored a series about Communist Romania, which was showcased by the Romanian Television Company.

== 2006 Final Report and related controversy ==
=== Early objections ===
Some who oppose or criticize Tismăneanu's appointment to head the Presidential Commission, his selection of other commission members, or the conclusions in the commission's final report, have drawn attention to several texts he authored in Romania, which they perceive as being Marxist-Leninist in content, and his activities inside the Union of Communist Youth. Among the critics of Tismăneanu's early activities was philosopher Gabriel Liiceanu, who stated that they were incompatible with the moral status required from a leader of the commission. However, Liiceanu endorsed the incrimination of communist regime and eventually the report itself.

After the presentation of the Final Report and the official condemnation of the communist regime by President Traian Băsescu in a joint session of the Romanian Parliament, Liiceanu openly expressed his support for Vladimir Tismăneanu and endorsed the Presidential Commission for the Analysis of the Communist Dictatorship in Romania. In November 2007, Liiceanu's publishing house, Humanitas, published in volume format the Final Report. Furthermore, Liiceanu, in the homage to Tismăneanu, when the latter was granted the award of the Group for Social Dialogue (January 2008), openly retracted his initial statements about Tismăneanu's academic and moral stature: "Vladimir Tismăneanu was the perfect person for completing the task of coordinating the Commission, considering that those who spoke after being exposed to this ideology explained it best. Vladimir Tismăneanu, besides owning such insider knowledge on what is communism at multiple levels, he then had an ideal competence, acquired and validated within the American academic environment, in order to be able to study this subject with both familiarity and distance." Liiceanu concluded: "He is the most qualified intellectual in the world for analyzing Romanian communism. His book Stalinism for All Seasons is the classical study in the field."

Early criticism of Tismăneanu based on allegations of communism was also voiced by writer Sorin Lavric. The author revised his stance soon afterward and, in four separate articles, gave his endorsement to both the Final Report and Vladimir Tismăneanu's later publications.

=== Political party-level reactions ===
Several commentators have argued that the negative reception of the Final Report in sections of the press and the political establishment was partly due to the investigation's implications, as the latter's overall condemnation of the communist regime has opened the road for further debates regarding the links between various contemporary politicians and the former communist structures. The examples cited include four Senate members: Ion Iliescu and Adrian Păunescu from the PSD, as well as Greater Romania Party leader Corneliu Vadim Tudor and Conservative Party leader Dan Voiculescu. The reading of the Final Report by President Băsescu was punctuated with heckling from among the Greater Romania Party Senate and Chamber representatives. One televised incident saw the group making attempts to force several audience members, including intellectuals Liiceanu, Horia-Roman Patapievici and Andrei Pleșu, out of the balcony overlooking the Parliament Hall. Several commentators have described the behavior of anti-Băsesecu parliamentarians during the public reading as "a circus act" (an expression also used by Patapievici).

Although Iliescu and PSD leader Mircea Geoană abstained from participating in the session, the Final Report was soon after approved with certain reserves by Geoană. Support for the document was also voiced by academic and Social Democratic parliamentarian Vasile Pușcaș, who noted that his group's objections addressed "working methods" and the perceived notion that the Commission claimed access to an "absolute truth". Pușcaș also took his distance from Iliescu's successive negative comments on the document. Similar assessments were made by Pușcaș's party colleague, sociologist Alin Teodorescu, who called the document "the work of a lifetime, [written] for sure in a perfectible manner, but ... an exceptional study", while stating that he objected to "Băsescu [having] climbed on Tismăneanu's shoulders." According to journalist Cristian Pătrășconiu, the conflict between Iliescu and Tismăneanu explained why, in the second edition of Tismăneanu's book of interviews with Iliescu, Marele șoc din finalul unui secol scurt (tr. The Great Shock of the Twentieth Century, first edition 2004), the latter's name was removed from the cover (a decision he attributed to Iliescu himself).

Among the consequences of the scandal, Urian states, is Vladimir Tismăneanu's "descent into the arena", leading some to perceive him as "a component of the never-ending political scandal and a predilect target for the president's adversaries." Urian also notes that, before the crisis, Romanian politicians from all camps, with the exception of Corneliu Vadim Tudor's supporters, viewed Tismăneanu with an equal "distant respect", before some grew worried that the commission was first step toward lustration. The conflict was further highlighted during early 2007 by Băsescu's preliminary impeachment by Parliament, a measure supported by the National Liberal Party of Premier Călin Popescu-Tăriceanu, the PSD, the Conservative Party, the Greater Romania Party, and the Democratic Union of Hungarians, and ultimately resolved in Băsescu's benefit by an impeachment referendum. During this crisis, Tismăneanu joined 49 other intellectuals in condemning the anti-Băsescu parliamentary opposition, signing an open letter which accused it of representing political corruption and the legacy of communism, and referred to its attitude toward the commission.

On the anti-Tismăneanu side, the controversy involved political forces most often described as extremist, in particular the Greater Romania Party. Such groups have an ideological objection to Tismăneanu's condemnation of both fascism and national communism. Cristian Vasile, who argues that this meeting of extremes had already been predicted and verified by Tismăneanu's notion of "baroque synthesis", specifically refers to a "fowl-smelling rhetorical cocktail" of neo-fascism or "(Neo-)Legionary characteristics" (in reference to the historical Iron Guard), neo-Stalinism and protochronism, to be found at the source of "media and historiographic ambuscades". In this context, claims of an antisemitic nature were issued, targeting Tismăneanu and his family. As Tismăneanu recalls in an interview with Jim Compton from the Washington Post, "A Greater Romania Party senator made a speech in Parliament, about 'five reasons why Tismăneanu should not head the commission,' and reason number three was that I was a Jew."

In July 2007, Tismăneanu sued the Greater Romania Party journals Tricolorul and România Mare, on grounds of calumny, in reference to the series of articles they published in the wake of the commission report. Tismăneanu, who demanded 100,000 Euro in compensation, indicated that he also contemplated suing the two papers in front of a United States court, were his case denied in Romania. He specified that the publications he cited were responsible for issuing "defamatory, xenophobic and antisemitic" articles targeting him personally. In addition, he referred to accusations that he had stolen archived documents from his native country and that had been enlisted by the Securitate. He had earlier recounted having received, at his College Park home, hate mail with explicit death threats and copies of Tricolorul and România Mare articles, and having informed campus police. According to Tismăneanu, such letters, using "almost identical terms", had been sent to him before 1989 by unknown antisemites. At the time of this incident, he again accused Greater Romania Party of endorsing the conspiracy theory of Jewish Bolshevism as incitement to racial hatred and violence, citing its leader's statements on Oglinda Television, which called Tismăneanu, among other things, "one of the most idiotic persons ... in Romania" and "an offspring of the Stalinist Jews who brought communism to Romania on top of Red Army tanks." Such attacks, Tismăneanu contended, "cannot but lead to polluting the public discourse and rendering hysterical those persons who belong the category of what [Romanian writer] Marin Preda called 'the basic aggressive spirit'."

=== Tismăneanu and Gallagher ===
Beginning in 2004, Tom Gallagher, a Professor of Ethnic Conflict and Peace at the University of Bradford and author of influential works on Romanian politics, expressed criticism of Vladimir Tismăneanu on various grounds. He authored a series of articles critical of Tismăneanu's involvement in local Romanian issues in the post-1989 era, and especially of his relations with Ion Iliescu. According to Gallagher, Tismăneanu "was useful to Iliescu in 2004 because the then President recognised the type of figure he was beneath the western reformist image he has cultivated".

Gallagher writes that Marele șoc "was ready to depict Ion Iliescu as an enlightened leader who, despite some flaws, had been instrumental in consolidating Romanian democracy", and that the volume, which he called "one of the strangest books to emerge from the Romanian transition", did not include, to Iliescu's advantage, any mentions of the controversial aspects of his presidency ("any serious enquiries about the mineriads, the manipulation of nationalism, the denigration of the historic parties [the National Peasants' Party and the National Liberal Party], civic movements and the monarchy, the explosion of corruption, or indeed the continuing political influence and fabulous wealth of the heirs of the pre-1989 intelligence service"). In addition, he wrote that, in agreeing to interview Iliescu, Vladimir Tismăneanu had come to contradict his own assessment of the post-Revolution regime, which he had earlier defined as "of a populist, corporatist and semi-fascist type". In contrast to this assessment, Ion Bogdan Lefter challenged that Tismăneanu had taken "unnecessary precautions" in stating his bias during the dialogue with Iliescu, given that the latter was "at the end of his political career", and stresses that the interviewer had preserved "a researcher's perspective" throughout the conversation. Also according to Lefter, the interest of the book does not reside with Iliescu's views on politics, which express "the already familiar 'official' version, formulated in his hardly bearable 'wooden tongue' ", but in his recollections of childhood and youth.

Gallagher expressed further criticism on Tismăneanu, writing that "he wishes to build up a vast patron-client network in contemporary history and political science not dissimilar to what the PSD did in those areas where it desired control". Referring to Tismăneanu's books, he also wrote: "But what about the role of the Securitate? In his books, [Tismăneanu] has never been especially interested in their role. Much of the time, he has seemed far more concerned with creating a psycho-biography of the life and times of his illegalist family in order to overcome the long lasting shock of having been cast into the wilderness for over twenty years when his family fell from grace under Gheorghiu-Dej." In other pieces he authored, Gallagher questioned Tismăneanu's expertise, comparing him to the Romanian-French businessman Adrian Costea, a person close to Iliescu who stood accused of encouraging political corruption, and claiming that he was using the academic environment as a venue for lobbying. He also took a negative view of his colleague's earlier collaboration with Jurnalul Național, a newspaper owned by Conservative Party leader Dan Voiculescu (who has been officially linked with the Securitate). Additionally, Gallagher complained about the publicized visit Tismăneanu paid to Gigi Becali, leader of the nationalist New Generation Party – Christian Democratic, at his residence in Pipera.

Tismăneanu replied to some of Gallagher's accusations in a manner described by Cotidianul's Cristian Pătrășconiu as "discreet". In an interview with Jurnalul Național, arguing that Marele șoc largely reflected Iliescu's own beliefs, which he had wanted to render accurately, and stating that "all I could do was to obtain the maximum of what can be obtained through dialog with [Iliescu]". He depicted Gallagher's attitude as "an outbreak of resentments", and indicated that "the only praise I could offer [Iliescu]" was in regard to the latter's respect for pluralism in front of authoritarianism. In later statements on the issue, he argued that Gallagher concerns about a supposed change in political views had been unfounded, while expressing regret over the fact that "I had not highlighted ... in those sections I authored, certain elements that would have made it clear for the reader where I stand". Elsewhere, he responded to claims made about his contacts with Becali by admitting that the visit was inappropriate. Cristian Vasile, who notes that concerns similar to those of Gallagher were expressed by historian Șerban Papacostea and by himself, argues that Tismăneanu effectively dissuaded fears of a "moral resignation" by not accepting any form of "privilege or public post" from the political sides he was alleged to favor.

By spring 2007, Gallagher and Tismăneanu reconciled, explaining that this was largely owed to their common support for Băsescu, who was then faced with impeachment. In that context, Gallagher explained his earlier position: "Marele șoc ... was published [at] a time when the Social Democratic Party were going through a lot of trouble to quiet international voices in order to cover the lack of significant reform of key state institutions. Tismăneanu argued at the time that because of agreeing to the NATO and EU accession, Iliescu was signaling his wishes of reconciliation with the democratic quarters in the country. Both the author and others gradually became convinced that Iliescu's intentions were far from targeting pluralism. He only aimed at legitimizing the elite whose leader he was and which he propelled out of communism to a new era essentially defined by violence, abuse and repression, as it was obvious already by 1990-91. For purposes of revealing such interest groups, the political scientist risked both his name and life. Both his results in the academic field and his unwavering determination must be appreciated and treasured, more so considering the insults and calumny showered upon him by the post-communist clique and their followers in the mass-media. I wish to express to Vladimir Tismăneanu my gratitude and utmost appreciation for his and the Commission's efforts, hoping that our initial disagreements are from now on belonging only to the past." Commenting on the developments following the impeachment referendum, Vladimir Tismăneanu indicated that he and Gallagher, together with British historian Dennis Deletant, had decided to campaign against the Parliament's decision and in favor of Traian Băsescu, a measure which he equated with support for "pluralism and transparency". Gallagher himself noted that the initiative was motivated by "the need to display solidarity in order to prevent the replacement of democracy with the collective autocracy of economic barons and their political allies. That would destabilize the Balkans, would discredit the EU and would place the country on the Eastern trajectory."

=== Ziua allegations ===
In 2006 and early 2007, Ziua newspaper repeatedly published accusatory claims that Tismăneanu had left with support from the Securitate, that he had settled abroad with assistance from the Communist Party of Venezuela, and that, after escaping Romania's communist censorship, he continued to publish materials supporting official communist tenets. Tismăneanu has rejected all allegations, indicating that they contradicted data present in, among others, files kept on him by the Securitate and the official conclusion reached by the National Council for the Study of Securitate Archives (CNSAS).

The article was also criticized by intellectuals such as Ovidiu Șimonca, Ioan T. Morar and Mircea Mihăieș. Writing for Observator Cultural, Șimonca argued that it was evidence of "defamation", that the information, which he deemed "horrific" and "hard to believe", was not substantiated by evidence, and that Ziua had vested interest in spreading rumors about Vladimir Tismăneanu. He also asked if Ziua's campaign was not itself motivated by "Securitate structures". In an editorial for the local newspaper Monitorul de Suceava, titled Prietenul meu, Vladimir Tismăneanu ("My Friend, Vladimir Tismăneanu"), Morar dismissed the article as "hogwash, egregious lies and let-ins", commenting that the claims made in regard to Tismăneanu's stay in Venezuela were "an aberration stemming from a rather obvious psychiatric diagnosis". He also made references to the fact that Ziua's editor in chief, Sorin Roșca-Stănescu, was himself a proven Securitate informant, arguing that the tactics employed by the newspaper in question were the equivalent of "blackmail". Soon afterward, Roșca-Stănescu issued a formal apology for those particular claims (while expressing further criticism of various aspects of Tismăneanu's biography).

Based on data which he indicated formed part of his CNSAS file, Tismăneanu also specified that he was the object of constant Securitate surveillance after his departure, that his mother was subject to pressures, and that derogatory comments on him, including a coded reference to his Jewish background (tunărean), were gathered from various informants and agents. He made mention of the fact that, according to the documents (the last of which were allegedly compiled in April 1990), the post-Revolution Foreign Intelligence Directorate had continued to monitor him. Tismăneanu also indicated his belief that the author of a denunciation note, who used the name Costin and recommended himself as a Faculty of Sociology professor, was the same person who, after 1989, had sent a letter to his University of Maryland employer, in which he had called attention to the communist activities of Leonte Tismăneanu (according to Vladimir Tismăneanu, the letter was dismissed as "abject" and irrelevant by its recipient). Tismăneanu also cited Costin's report to the Securitate, which expressed concern that his doctoral thesis was a covert popularization of the Frankfurt School and its reinterpretations of Marxist thought. According to his former colleague Radu Ioanid, the Urban Sociology Department group had been under constant Securitate surveillance, especially after Tismăneanu defected. Ioanid quoted his own Securitate file, which, in a post-1981 comment, referred to his "close contacts" with Tismăneanu, defining the latter as "a sociologist of Jewish nationality, a former office colleague [of Ioanid's], presently an outstandingly hostile collaborator of Radio Free Europe [who has] settled in the USA." Ioanid also referred to Tismăneanu's family in Romania having been "heckled" by the Securitate, especially after he himself had been made suspect by his historical research into Romanian antisemitism.

In January 2007, Ziua contributor Vladimir Alexe published in facsimile a text which he considered part of a separate file kept on Tismăneanu by the Counter-Espionage unit of the Securitate, dated 1987. According to this, Tismăneanu was well appreciated for his professional and Romanian Communist Party work prior to 1981, and had held the position of lecturer on the Propaganda Commission of the Communist Party Municipal Committee for Bucharest. The same text also contradicts Tismăneanu's indication that he had not been allowed to travel to the West prior to 1981, by stating that he had been approved tourist visas for both the Eastern Bloc and "capitalist states". The facsimile was accompanied by an open letter containing similar accusatory claims made by Dan Mureșan, who recommended himself as the political consultant of a company working for the United States Republican Party, and relying on the assertion that Tismăneanu had settled in the United States only after 1985. Several months before, Alexe had himself been accused by Cotidianul newspaper of having been a Securitate informant and confronted with a CNSAS file which appeared to confirm this, but had rejected the claim as manipulative.

As leaders of anti-communist opinion inside the former Eastern Bloc, invited by President Băsescu the Final Report reading, Lech Wałęsa and Vladimir Bukovsky had been requested by Ziua to comment on the Commission's activities. When asked if he knew Tismăneanu, Wałęsa replied "No, I don't know, I don't have such a good memory", while Bukovsky stated "I don't know Tismăneanu, I know nothing about him. I would like people to understand what they did in the past. He too should understand the part he played".

Writing for Evenimentul Zilei in May 2007, Tismăneanu accused Ziua of "intoxication", and argued that the journal's stated anti-communism was meant to avert attention from its association with Băsescu's critics, at a time when the president was impeached and reinstated by popular suffrage. Commenting that the anti-Băsescu group was setting itself against "popular sovereignty" and ruling through a "continuous parliamentary putsch", he also accused Ziua and other press venues, including Dan Voiculescu's Jurnalul Național and Antena 1, were engaged in a campaign to discredit Băsescu. In his view, the coalition of political forces itself represented a "black quadrilateral" reuniting diverse left-wing forces and "camouflaged-green" groups inspired by the Iron Guard, whose goal he alleged was in "establishing an oligarchic-neo-Securist dictatorship". Tismăneanu stated that this was connected with earlier criticism of the Commission, arguing that, despite its editors professing anti-communism, "Ziua has been doing nothing other than throw mud at the [Commission] members and at the very purpose of the Commission." Similar accusations against such press organs, as well as against Voiculescu's newer station Antena 3, were repeated during subsequent interviews.

In July 2007, Gabriel Liiceanu and former Ziua contributor Dan Tapalagă sued the latter newspaper for calumny, referring to various allegations made against them—Liiceanu considered that, in his case, Ziua had organized a campaign of libel after he had decided to rally with supporters of the Report. According to Adevărul journal, the three argued that their initiative was an attempt "to purge the language of the Romanian press, and to put a stop to the publishing of articles that 'poison' public opinion." Patapievici also expressed his concern that the anti-Băsescu section of the Romanian public made little effort to condemn Ziua for its "mudslinging".

=== Michael Shafir and Iluzia anticomunismului ===
Repeated criticism of the Final Report was voiced by Romanian-born Israeli historian and former Radio Free Europe contributor Michael Shafir. In a January 2007 interview with Tapalagă, Shafir had expressed objections to the document's referencing a "genocide" in Communist Romania, arguing that this verdict was exaggerated and unscientific, and objected to Iron Guard activists allegedly being included among the regime's victims, in the same category as members of democratic forces. Shafir, who nevertheless also stated the existence of "chapters in the report where I wouldn't change one comma", rated the text "a seven, no more than an eight." Accusing Vladimir Tismăneanu's adversaries at Ziua of having a dissimulated far right agenda, he added: "Every time Mr. Tismăneanu was attacked unjustly, I took a stand provided I thought my word counted." In late May 2006, Shafir had joined a group of intellectuals (comprising Liviu Antonesei, Andrei Cornea, Marta Petreu, Andrei Oișteanu, Leon Volovici and others) who together issued a formal protest against Ziua journalists, in particular Dan Ciachir, Victor Roncea and Vladimir Alexe, over their treatment of figures such as Tismăneanu and Foreign Minister Mihai Răzvan Ungureanu, and over their allegedly Iron Guard-inspired and antisemitic rhetoric. Shafir's perspective on the matter of genocide was supported early on by exiled writer Dumitru Țepeneag, who described the "far from perfect" Final Report as having the "not at all dismissible quality of being in existence", while calling its main author "an opportunist".

In 2008 Shafir joined Gabriel Andreescu, Daniel Barbu, Alex Cistelecan, Vasile Ernu, Adrian-Paul Iliescu, Costi Rogozanu, Ciprian Șiulea, Ovidiu Țichindeleanu and other intellectuals from various fields in writing a critique of the Final Report, named Iluzia anticomunismului ("The Illusion of Anti-communism"). The volume was written from both mainstream liberal and left-wing positions, and objected to parts of the report on various grounds—including its definitions of genocide, the absence of detail on Communist Romania's contribution to positive causes such as literacy campaigns, an alleged overemphasis on the intellectuals' role in the events described, and in particular the tone, which the authors perceived as indicative of bias. In addition to the critique of the text, Iluzia anticomunismului made reproaches on Tismăneanu himself. It stated that, although well-selected overall, the commission had included Patapievici and Nicolae Manolescu for "clientelistic" reasons (Andreescu); that Tismăneanu was favorably reviewing the works of his friend Dan Pavel, who, it concluded, had lost credibility by campaigning with the New Generation Party (Rogozanu); and that he only answered to marginal and violent criticism from venues such as the Greater Romania Party, being indifferent to his peers' objections, and constructing an image of "good" vs. "bad intellectuals" (Șiulea). The group also complained that Romanian publishing houses were unwilling to endorse their critique, on account of which the work was published by Editura Cartier in neighboring Moldova.

The new book itself sparked debates in the media. Patapievici sees it as evidence of "extermination criticism, hypocritically presented as impersonal". He also reproached Șiulea his conclusions that the report was not neutrally voiced and that Tismăneanu's background made his moral standing questionable. Essayist and Idei în Dialog contributor Horațiu Pepine proposed that "beyond the visible and unrestrained resentment, it contains an emotional state and a tension that seems to speak of a certain social suffering." Pepine concluded that, among the authors, the "young revisionists" were the voice of a newer social class, which had emerged as a result of Ceaușescu's policies and was faced with becoming "déclassé". According to Pepine, at least some of the authors had already publicly objected to the idea of condemning communism before the Final Report had been issued. Iluzia anticomunismului earned the endorsement of historian Lorin Ghiman, who saw in it a correct evaluation of the Commission's actual goals, described by Ghiman as "the rhetorical and symbolical legitimation for the hegemony of an intelligentsia preoccupied with maintaining a monopoly on opinion." Ghiman also objected to Vladimir Tismăneanu's alleged refusal to engage Iluzia anticomunismului writers in a public debate, but added that he did not perceive a personal conflict, and that "all editors of the volume have publicly expressed their respect for Mr. Tismăneanu, for all the reserves they voice in respect to various of his decisions." Historian Sorin Adam Matei has also criticized the report, on editorial, legal and pragmatic grounds. He pointed to the fact that the conclusions were published before the report was even written and argued that the text incorporates verbatim sections from pre-existing works, suggesting a superficial and non-systematic approach to its writing. Matei concludes that the report generally fails to make a legal, factually grounded case for specific indictments of specific facts or individuals, under legal provisions valid at the time of commission of the acts described in the report. He called for a remake of the project, in a more legalistic and practically oriented manner.

In a December 2008 article, Tismăneanu stated that the allegation according to which he had not engaged his critics in a public debate was "completely false", and indicated several instances which he believed count as such. Tismăneanu also responded to critiques that the Commission was preparing "a sort of 'single textbook' " on Romanian communism, defining the Final Report as "a synthesis which would lead to further explorations." He summarized the topics of criticism against him and the document, arguing that they were for most connected to his person, and that they echoed accusations made against investigators of criminal regimes in Chile, Germany, Guatemala or South Africa. He also stated that, with the exception of Daniel Barbu, none of the Iluzia anticomunismului authors had cited "[scientific] literature in connection with the memory of totalitarianism .... No historical document that would contradict or disprove the conclusions of the Report was made available." Tismăneanu contended the writers' motivations were "frustrations, phobias and a desire ... for fame", and asserted that their arguments were equivalent to an "irresponsible Marxism-Leninism" he associates with Slovenian sociologist Slavoj Žižek. He later objected on principle to the implication that he was "expected to answer" to issues raised by Iluzia anticomunismului.

=== Ramifications of the dispute ===
Some criticism of Tismăneanu's leadership of the commission was also voiced by other sections of the Romanian academic environment. One such voice was historian Florin Constantiniu, who, although viewing Tismăneanu's contributions as relevant, saw the Final Report as Tismăneanu's betrayal of his father's memory, likening him to the famed Soviet delator Pavlik Morozov. Cristian Vasile calls Constantiniu's statement "unwarranted and offensive", contrasts it with the incriminated document, where Leonte Tismăneanu is only mentioned in passing, concluding that the accuser had not read the text he was discussing. Rumors also surfaced of a clash between Tismăneanu and Marius Oprea, Commission member and head of the older Romanian Institute of Recent History, which, according to Vasile, was a method for Tismăneanu's detractors to encourage "a destructive competition". This controversy was rekindled in early 2010, when Tismăneanu replaced Oprea at the helm of the Institute for the Investigation of Communist Crimes in Romania. Oprea, who received open support from various Romanian and foreign intellectuals and political figures, claimed that Tismăneanu's term at the head of a reformed institute (which also comprised Romanian diaspora archives) was a political deal aimed at shifting focus away from criminology. Speaking at the time, Oprea mentioned that he felt "shame" for having sat on the 2006 Commission.

Tismăneanu himself referred to criticism of the Final Report from the part of several members of the Institute of the Romanian Revolution, noting that their reply, published in a special issue of the body's official journal, was prefaced by Ion Iliescu, and inferring a common political agenda. In July 2007, Cotidianul reporter Mirela Corlățan reviewed and supported accusations of censorship and pro-Iliescu bias inside the institute, quoting Tismăneanu and other scholars critical of the body's policies. Corlățan's article cited historian Miodrag Millin, a resigned member of the Institute, who deemed the reply: "a state-sponsored 'clog' forced on the condemnation of communism, without any [of the Institute members] taking responsibility for those opinions." Millin added: "It is an institution born into old age, with no synchronization to reality, led by Ion Iliescu and his cronies." Other local academic reactions, Cristian Vasile claims, were mostly motivated by covert sympathies for communist historiography among the "spiritually aged professors"; Vasile cites one academic's comment that Tismăneanu was an unprofessional and "one of the communist regime's profiteers", calling the statement "venomous" and presuming it to display "repulsion and envy". He also identifies such historians as persons whose careers were shaped in the final decades of communism, under the influence of protochronism and other nationalist historiographic interpretations favored by Ilie Ceaușescu, a Romanian Army general and brother of Nicolae.

An extended polemic was sparked between the Tismăneanu Commission and the dissident writer Paul Goma. Goma, who initially accepted an invitation to become a commission member, as issued by Tismăneanu himself, claims to have been excluded after a short while by "the self-styled 'eminent members of civil society'". According to Tismăneanu, this happened only after Goma engaged in and publicized personal attacks aimed at other Commission members, allegedly calling Tismăneanu "a Bolshevik offspring", based on his family history. Tismăneanu also indicated that Goma's statements had been prompted by rumors that he had sided with other intellectuals in condemning as "antisemitic" the views he had expressed on issues pertaining to the 1940 Soviet occupation of Bessarabia. He denied ever having made public his views on this particular matter, and Goma consequently apologized for not having sufficiently verified the information. The commission justified the exclusion based on Goma's implicit and later explicit refusal to recognize the board as a valid instrument. The fact that Sorin Antohi, who was a confirmed former collaborator of the Communist regime's Securitate, and known to have falsified his academic credentials, was selected for the commission's panel, has prompted further criticism. Antohi resigned in September 2006.

The Final Report and the activity of the Presidential Commission received endorsement from the American media and the academic community. Georgetown University professor Charles King stated the following in his review of the Commission's Report: "the report is the most serious, in-depth, and far-reaching attempt to understand Romania's communist experience ever produced. It ... marked the culmination of months of feverish research and writing. It is based on thousands of pages of archival documents, recent scholarship in several languages, and the comparative experience of other European countries, all refracted through the critical lenses provided by some of Romania's most talented, and most abrasively honest, thinkers. ... The Tismăneanu commission's chief tasks had to do with both morality and power: to push Romanian politicians and Romanian society into drawing a line between past and present, putting an end to nostalgia for an alleged period of greatness and independence, and embracing the country's de facto cultural pluralism and European future." In reply to Jim Compton's favorable review of the commission and its early activities, Romanian-American businessman Victor Gaetan wrote a letter, originally published in the op-ed section of The Washington Post and republished by Ziua, in which he referred to the Tismăneanu family's nomenklaturist history and described Tismăneanu's doctoral thesis as "a vitriolic indictment of Western values".

Further ramifications of the scandal came in summer 2009, when leadership of Cotidianul newspaper was taken over by Cornel Nistorescu, whose change in editorial line prompted a wave of resignations among the newspaper panelists, who identified the new policies as an unmitigated anti-Băsescu bias, and complained that Nistorescu was imposing censorship on independent contributors. In subsequent statements, Nistorescu alleged that his adversaries represented a pro-Băsescu "pack" led by Tismăneanu himself. Journalist Mădălina Șchiopu reacted against this perspective and other accusations aimed by Nistorescu toward his former colleagues, arguing that they amounted to "a story with little green men and flying saucers" which served to cover the "fundamental incompatibility between [Nistorescu's] decisions and the notion of decency." She viewed "the idea that the source for all that is wrong with the Romanian press can be found somewhere in Tismăneanu's entourage" as equivalent to declaring that Tismăneanu "turns into a vârcolac under the fool moon and eats the newly born". In one of his other editorials, the new Cotidianul editor revisited Tismăneanu's past, quoting statements from the 1980s which, he wrote, made Tismăneanu "a devoted communist activist" incompatible with his later appointments: "The chairman of the Presidential Commission could do anything, except condemning that which he has supported." The events also prompted an article by Tismăneanu's friend, novelist Mircea Cărtărescu. It sarcastically included Nistorescu, alongside Vadim Tudor, Roșca-Stănescu, Voiculescu, Geoană and businessman Dinu Patriciu, all of them adverse to Băsescu, among the "champions of democracy", noting that himself, Tismăneanu and other public figures who did not abandon Băsescu's cause "despite his human flaws", were being negatively portrayed as "ass-kissers" and "blind people".

The implications of the scandal also involved several Wikipedia entries, particularly those on Romanian Wikipedia. In June 2007, Vladimir Tismăneanu stated: "I did not make efforts to respond to the wave of calumnies (which have infested the two Wikipedia articles about me in both English and Romanian) because I followed the precept 'You do not dignify them with an answer'." During a 2008 colloquy on "The Campaign against the Intellectuals", organized by Revista 22 and attended by several journalists and civil society members, Horia-Roman Patapievici stated: "How does one respond to the claim that one has no right condemn communism over being what one is? How come so many people are not indignant over this kind of argumentation? ... [Tismăneanu's] page on Wikipedia was vandalized and has stayed that way. Viewers of the page are okay with the tendentious information there. You were outraged, for just cause, when a Jewish cemetery was vandalized, but, please, also express public outrage toward the vandalizing of Wikipedia pages on Vladimir Tismăneanu. ... Why do those who supervise the Wikipedia franchise in Romania allow this grave disinformation of the public, by forcefully maintaining a vandalized page? The absence of such an indignation is the most significant contribution to our country's morally unbreathable air."

=== Allegations of intimidation and influence peddling ===
Tismăneanu has been accused by multiple Romanian and foreign scholars and researchers of employing dubious methods to squelch criticism of him and his works. In May 2012, the well-respected scholar Alina Mungiu-Pippidi wrote, "I hope that Volodea will once again become the spiritual creature, subtle and with a sense of humor who he used to be, and that we can forget this sinister alter-ego that he has become, telephoning newspapers and television stations to orchestrate--without being asked by anybody--pro-Băsescu propaganda and putting pressure on independent journalists." According to Michael Shafir, Tismăneanu responded to criticisms by the American researcher Richard Hall as follows: "On the one hand, the vicepresident of the Civic Alliance, Sorin Ilieșiu, a person close to Tismăneanu, reacted by putting the word "analyst" in quotes, so that the journalist Andrei Bădin could then "demonstrate" that Hall wasn't a CIA analyst, but had only served an insignificant "probationary" period of six months. The person who was the object of his criticism knew better: Hall had published in the very journal that he had previously led ("East European Politics and Societies"). So he picked up the telephone and yelled at Richard Hall's supervisor, in a scene that could have been included in "Stalinism for All Seasons." Michael Shafir detailed Tismăneanu's tactics more broadly in an article entitled suggestively, "About Questionable Clarifications, Plagiarism, Being an Imposter, and Careerism." In November 2013, Vasile Ernu told an interviewer how Editura Curtea Veche cancelled a book contract because among a handful of references to Tismăneanu one suggested that "Tismăneanu employs two different discourses, one inside Romania and one outside."

== Works ==
=== Originally published in Romanian ===
- Noua Stîngă și școala de la Frankfurt (Editura Politică, Bucharest, 1976). OCLC 6023264.
- Mic dicționar social-politic pentru tineret (with various; Editura Politică, Bucharest, 1981). OCLC 255128067.
- Condamnați la fericire. Experimentul comunist în România (Grup de edituri ale Fundației EXO, Bucharest, 1991). ISBN 973-95421-0-7.
- Arheologia terorii (Editura Eminescu, Bucharest, 1992). OCLC 35040287.
- Ghilotina de scrum (Editura de Vest, Timișoara, 1992). ISBN 973-36-0123-3.
- Irepetabilul trecut (Editura Albatros, Bucharest, 1994). ISBN 973-24-0353-5.
- Fantoma lui Gheorghiu-Dej (Editura Univers, Bucharest, 1995). ISBN 973-34-0324-5.
- Noaptea totalitară: crepusculul ideologiilor radicale în Europa de Est (Editura Athena, Bucharest, 1995). ISBN 973-97181-1-6.
- Balul mascat. Un dialog cu Mircea Mihăieș (with Mircea Mihăieș; Polirom, Iași, 1996). ISBN 973-9248-01-2.
- Încet spre Europa. Vladimir Tismăneanu în dialog cu Mircea Mihăieș (with Mircea Mihăieș; Polirom, Iași, 2000). ISBN 973-683-558-8.
- Spectrele Europei Centrale (Polirom, Iași, 2001). ISBN 973-683-683-5.
- Scrisori din Washington (Polirom, Iași, 2002). ISBN 973-683-980-X.
- Marele șoc din finalul unui secol scurt. Ion Iliescu în dialog cu Vladimir Tismăneanu (dialogue with Ion Iliescu; Editura Enciclopedică, Bucharest, 2004). ISBN 973-45-0473-8.
- Schelete în dulap (with Mircea Mihăieș; Polirom, Iași, 2004). ISBN 973-681-795-4.
- Scopul și mijloacele: Eseuri despre ideologie, tiranie și mit (Editura Curtea Veche, Bucharest, 2004). ISBN 973-669-060-1.
- Democrație și memorie (Editura Curtea Veche, Bucharest, 2006). ISBN 973-669-230-2.
- Refuzul de a uita. Articole și comentarii politice (2006–2007) (Editura Curtea Veche, Bucharest, 2007). ISBN 973-669-382-1.
- Cortina de ceață (with Mircea Mihăieș; Polirom, Iași, 2007). ISBN 973-46-0908-4.
- Raport final - Comisia Prezidențială pentru Analiza Dictaturii Comuniste din România (with various; Humanitas, Bucharest, 2007). ISBN 978-973-50-1836-8.
- Perfectul acrobat. Leonte Răutu, măștile răului (with Cristian Vasile; Humanitas, Bucharest, 2008). ISBN 978-973-50-2238-9.

=== Originally published in English ===
- The Crisis of Marxist Ideology in Eastern Europe: The Poverty of Utopia (Routledge, London, 1988). ISBN 0-415-00494-2.
- Latin American Revolutionaries: Groups, Goals, Methods (with Michael Radu; Potomac Books, Dulles, 1990). ISBN 0-08-037429-8.
- In Search of Civil Society: Independent Peace Movements in the Soviet Bloc (with various; Routledge, London, 1990). ISBN 0-415-90248-7.
- Debates on the Future of Communism (with Judith Shapiro; Palgrave Macmillan, New York, 1991) ISBN 0-312-05220-0.
- Uprooting Leninism, Cultivating Liberty (with Patrick Clawson; University Press of America, Lanham, 1992). ISBN 0-8191-8729-1.
- Reinventing Politics: Eastern Europe from Stalin to Havel (Free Press, New York, 1992). ISBN 0-7432-1282-7.
- Political Culture and Civil Society in Russia and the New States of Eurasia (M. E. Sharpe, Armonk, 1995). ISBN 1-56324-364-4.
- Fantasies of Salvation: Democracy, Nationalism and Myth in Post-Communist Europe (Princeton University Press, Princeton, 1998). ISBN 0-691-04826-6.
- The Revolutions of 1989 (Re-Writing Histories) (with various; Routledge, London, 1999). ISBN 0-203-97741-6.
- Between Past and Future: The Revolutions of 1989 and Their Aftermath (with Sorin Antohi; Central European University Press, New York, 2000). ISBN 963-9116-71-8.
- Stalinism for All Seasons: A Political History of Romanian Communism (University of California Press, Berkeley, 2003). ISBN 0-520-23747-1.
- World Order After Leninism (with Marc Morjé Howard, Rudra Sil, Kenneth Jowitt; University of Washington Press, Seattle, 2006). ISBN 0-295-98628-X.
- Stalinism Revisited: The Establishment of Communist Regimes in East-Central Europe (with various; Central European University Press, New York, 2009). ISBN 978-963-9776-55-5.
- The Devil in History: Communism, Fascism, and Some Lessons of the Twentieth Century (University of California Press, Berkeley, 2012). ISBN 978-052-0239-72-2.

=== Bilingual ===
- Vecinii lui Franz Kafka. Romanul unei nevroze/The Neighbors of Franz Kafka. The Novel of a Neurosis (with Mircea Mihăieș; Polirom, Iași, 1998). ISBN 973-683-172-8.

== General references ==
- (In Romanian) Biography at Polirom.ro; retrieved October 3, 2007
- Lucian Boia (ed.), Miturile comunismului românesc, Editura Nemira, Bucharest, 1998. ISBN 973-569-209-0.
