= Tismăneanu =

Tismăneanu is a Romanian surname. Notable people with the surname include:

- Leonte Tismăneanu (1913–1981), Romanian communist activist
- Vladimir Tismăneanu (born 1951), Romanian-American political scientist and sociologist
