= Sorin Antohi =

Romanian historian, essayist, and journalist

- Born: 20 August 1957 (age 69); Târgu Ocna, Bacău Region, Romanian People's Republic
- Education: Alexandru Ioan Cuza University; School for Advanced Studies in the Social Sciences
- Occupations: Historian; essayist; journalist
- Employers: University of Michigan; University of Bucharest; Central European University
- Website: www.sorinantohi.org

Sorin Antohi (born 20 August 1957) is a Romanian historian, essayist, and journalist.

== Biography ==
Antohi was born in Târgu Ocna, Bacău County. He received his Bachelor of Arts and Master of Arts degrees from the University of Iași and a DEA from École des Hautes Études en Sciences Sociales in Paris.

He taught history at the University of Michigan, at the University of Bucharest, and at the Central European University of Budapest (since 1995). At CEU, he founded Pasts, Inc. Institute for Historical Studies, where he pursued many scholarly activities. Antohi was part of the Presidential Commission for the Study of the Communist Dictatorship in Romania at the bequest of its chair, Vladimir Tismăneanu, before resigning in May 2006.

In 2018, he became a member of the Academia Europaea.

== Controversy ==
In a 2006 open letter published in the Bucharest-based 22 review, Antohi admitted to having collaborated with the Securitate, the secret police in Communist Romania, during the 1970s and the 1980s. He also claimed that he had been persecuted, and physically abused by the same Securitate as a member of the Jassy Group of anti-communist intellectuals, which included Dan Petrescu, Liviu Antonesei, Luca Pițu and others. As an informant, he claimed that he offered non-detrimental information on the political views of many of his close friends.

On 20 October 2006 the Romanian press reported that representatives of the Romanian Ministry of Education discovered that Antohi never defended his doctoral thesis in the country. It appears that he failed to write his PhD thesis, and was expelled from the doctoral program of the University of Iași in 2000. His Curriculum vitae at the Central European University also listed several books that Antohi claimed were published by Polirom press, but which journalists from the Ziua de Iași daily were unable to locate; Antohi was unavailable for comment.

In October 2006, this sequence of scandals led him to resign from his position as head of the history department at the Central European University in Budapest, Hungary, and from the Pasts, Inc. Institute for Historical Studies. As of 21 December 2006, he is still an editor of the academic journal East European Politics and Societies, where his collaborator Vladimir Tismăneanu is chair of the editorial committee.

The scandal broke out again in July–August 2008, in Germany and Romania, after having co-directed a Conference with the financial help of the Institute for Cultural Studies. Newspapers in Germany and Romania alleged that Antohi had, in public forums over the course of the previous year, represented himself as the director of two research institutes, one in Germany and one in Romania, which do not exist. At this time the scandal was, in part, revived by the Romanian-German author and Nobel Prize Winner Herta Müller who, in a letter in the Frankfurter Rundschau, asked how it was that Antohi, who had been an informer since the age of 19, and who had falsified his PhD diploma, had been invited to an event at a Romanian cultural institute in Berlin.

== Work ==
His historical work focuses on intellectual history, the history of ideas, historical theory and the history of historiography, and Romanian studies in European contexts. Antohi has also been actively involved in many institutional projects, focusing on the "education, training and career development of emerging scholars" from Eastern Europe.

=== Published volumes ===
- Utopica. Studii asupra imaginarului social ("Utopica. Studies on Social Imagination"). Editura Științifică, Bucharest, 1991 (second, revised and expanded [edition]Idea, Cluj-Napoca, 2005)
- Civitas imaginalis. Istorie și utopie în cultura română ("Civitas Imaginalis. History and Utopia in Romanian Culture"), Litera, Bucharest, 1994 (second revised edition, Polirom, Iași, 1999)
- Exercițiul distanței. Discursuri, societăți, metode ("The Practice of Distance. Discourses, Societies, and Methods"), Nemira, Bucharest, 1997 (second edition, 1998)
- Imaginaire culturel et réalité politique dans la Roumanie moderne. Le Stigmate et l'utopie ("Cultural Imagination and Political Reality in Modern Romania. The Stigma and the Utopia"), L'Harmattan, Paris-Montréal, 1999
- Războaie culturale. Idei, intelectuali, spirit public (Cultural wars. Ideas, Intellectuals and Public Ethos), Jassy, Ed. Polirom, 2007

=== Co-authored ===
- with Moshe Idel, Ceea ce ne uneste. Istorii, biografii, idei (What binds us together. Histories, biographies, ideas), Polirom, Iasi, 2006
- with Adrian Marino, Al treilea discurs. Cultură, ideologie și politică în România ("The Third Discourse. Culture, Ideology, and Politics in Romania"), Polirom, Iași, 2001
- with Mihai Șora: Mai avem un viitor? România la început de mileniu ("Do We Still Have a Future? Romania at the Start of the Millennium"), Polirom, Iaşi, 2001
- with Alexandru Zub: Oglinzi retrovizoare. Istorie, memorie si morală în România ("Rearview Mirrors. History, Memory, and Morals in Romania"), Polirom, Iaşi, 2000

=== Edited volumes ===
- 2007, Narratives Unbound. Historical Studies in Post-Communist Eastern Europe. New York-Budapest: CEU Press, 514 pages (co-edited with Balazs Trencsenyi and Peter Apor).
- 2003, Geografii simbolice, Caietele Echinox. Cluj: Dacia, 296 pp (co-edited with Corin Braga).
- 2003, Ioan Petru Culianu. Omul și opera, Jassy, Editura Polirom, 653 pp.
- 2001, Religion, Fiction, and History. Essays in Memory of Ioan Petru Culianu. Bucharest: Nemira. 2 vols. (415 + 590 pp.).
- 2000, Between Past and Future: The Revolutions of 1989 and Their Aftermath, Central European University Press, Budapest (coeditor Vladimir Tismăneanu)
- 1997, Dialog și libertate. Eseuri în onoarea lui Mihai Șora, București, ed. Nemira, 332 pp. (coeditor Aurelian Crăiuțu).
