= Alexandru Graur =

Romanian linguist (1900–1988)

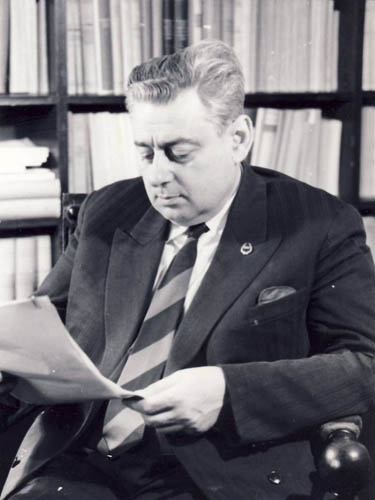
Alexandru Graur

Alexandru Graur (Romanian pronunciation: [alekˈsandru ˈɡra.ur]; July 9, 1900 – July 9, 1988) was a Romanian linguist.

Born into a Jewish family in Botoșani, Graur graduated from the Faculty of Letters of the University of Bucharest and the École Pratique des Hautes Études in Paris (1924–1929). He obtained a Doctor of Philosophy degree from the Sorbonne. After returning to Bucharest, he became involved in academic life and published studies in different periodicals.

Graur founded and was the principal (1941–1944) of the "Liceul particular evreiesc" (Jewish Private High School). In 1946 he started teaching at the university level. In 1955 he was named titular member of the Romanian Academy. Between 1954 and 1956 he was the Dean of the Faculty of Letters at the University of Bucharest. He wrote many papers and articles on classical philology and etymology. He had many contributions in the field of linguistics, phonetics, and grammar of the Latin and Romanian languages.

In 1956, Graur, alongside Dean Iorgu Iordan, leading propagandist Leonte Tismăneanu, and the academics Mihai Novicov, Ion Coteanu, and Radu Florian, took part in a University inquiry into the anti-communist statements of Paul Goma, a university student who later became a noted dissident and writer. Led by Iordan and supervised by the Securitate, the investigation culminated in Goma's expulsion from the Faculty and his subsequent arrest. In 1971, he was awarded the Order of Tudor Vladimirescu, 2nd class.

He was married twice, the second time with Neaga Graur (1921–2005) in 1947, and they had a son, Dumitru (born 1947). Streets in Botoșani and Cluj-Napoca are named after him.

== Published works ==
- Nom d'agent et adjectif en roumain, Champion, Paris, 1929
- La romanité du Roumain, Editura Academiei Române, Bucharest, 1965
- The Romance Character of Romanian, Editura Academiei Române, Bucharest, 1965
- Nume de persoane, București, Editura Științifică, Bucharest, 1965
- Tendințele actuale ale limbii române, Editura Științifică, Bucharest, 1968
- Scrieri de ieri și de azi, Editura Științifică, Bucharest, 1970
- Puțină... aritmetică, Editura Științifică, Bucharest, 1971
- Nume de locuri, Editura Științifică, Bucharest, 1972
- Gramatica azi, Editura Academiei Române, Bucharest, 1973
- Mic tratat de ortografie, Editura Științifică, Bucharest, 1974
- Dicționar al greșelilor de limbă, Editura Academiei Române, Bucharest, 1982
- Puțină gramatică, Editura Academiei Române, Bucharest, 1987
