= Dorin Tudoran =

Romanian poet, essayist, journalist and dissident

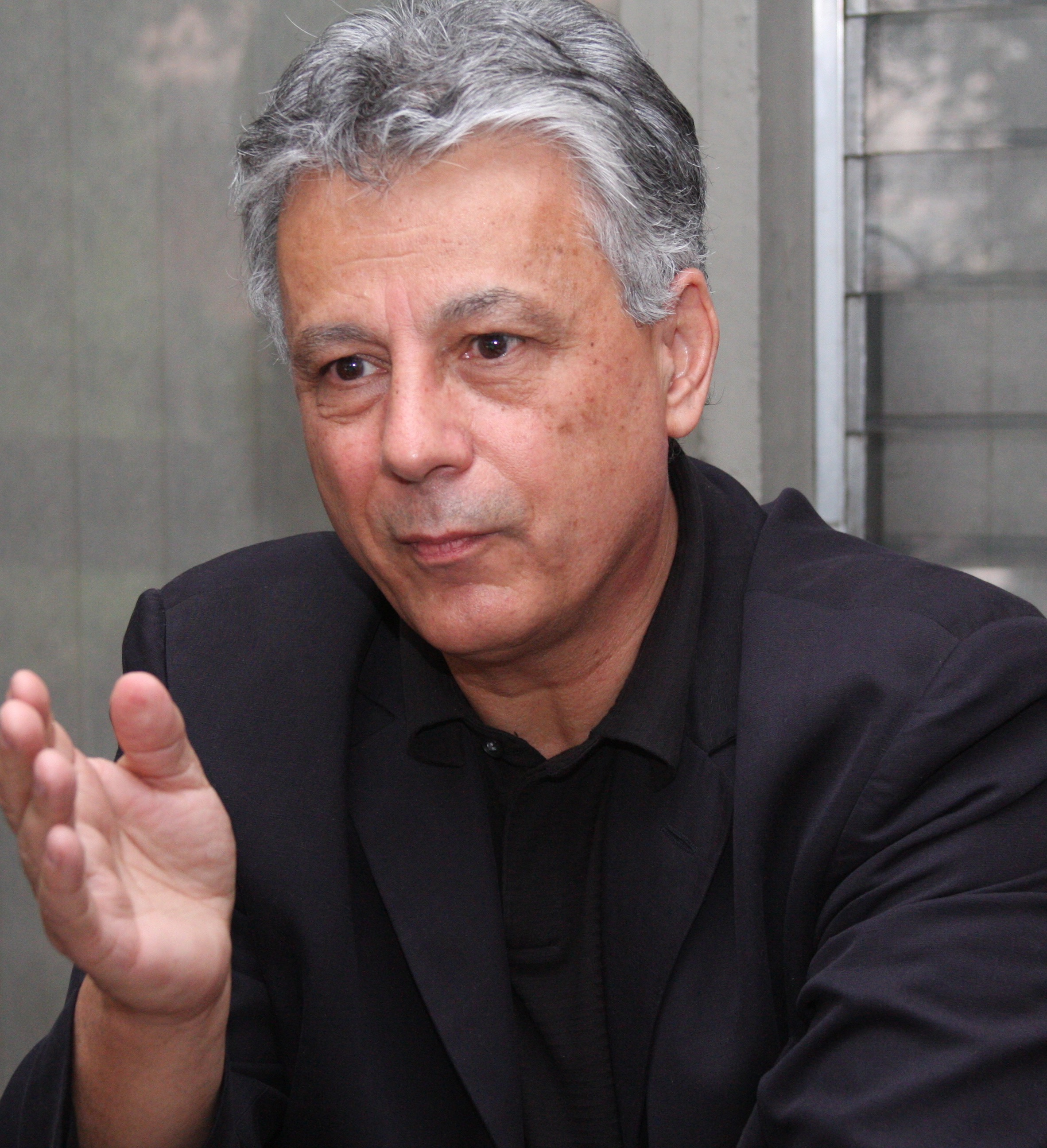
- Dorin Tudoran in 2009
- Born: June 30, 1945 (age 81); Timișoara, Kingdom of Romania
- Education: University of Bucharest
- Occupations: poet, essayist, journalist
- Writing career
- Notable awards: Order of the Star of Romania, Knight rank

Dorin Tudoran (born June 30, 1945) is a Romanian poet, essayist, journalist, and dissident. A resident of the United States since 1985, he has authored more than fifteen books of poetry, essays, and interviews.

== Biography ==
=== Early life ===
Born in Timișoara, he attended the Mihai Viteazul High School in Bucharest, graduating in 1963. He pursued his studies at the Faculty of Languages and Literature of the University of Bucharest, obtaining a B.A. degree in 1968. Tudoran made his debut in 1973 with a volume of poetry, Mic tratat de glorie. He was an editor at Flacăra (1973–1974) and Luceafărul (1974–1980). From 1977 to 1981, he belonged to the ruling council of the Writers' Union of Romania. In March 1982, he resigned from the Romanian Communist Party (an extremely rare act at the time).

On April 7, 1984, Tudoran asked to emigrate from Communist Romania, together with his family. Denied a response, he wrote a letter on August 1, 1984, to Nicolae Ceaușescu. After being threatened with legal proceedings, he started a hunger strike on April 25, 1985, asking for an audience at the U.S. Embassy in Bucharest. The hunger strike lasted for 42 days. In response to pleas from human rights groups, he was allowed to leave Romania for the United States, on July 24, 1985, the same day as dissident priest Gheorghe Calciu-Dumitreasa.

=== In the United States ===
In the United States, Tudoran founded and ran two magazines, Agora (funded by the Foreign Policy Research Institute in Philadelphia, 1987–1992) and Meridian (Washington, D.C., 1990–1991), and worked as an international broadcaster at the Voice of America. He was also a guest lecturer at the University of Connecticut (1986), and a research fellow at The Catholic University of America (1987). He then started working for the International Foundation for Election Systems (IFES), a Washington, D.C.–based organization. From 2004 to January 2007, Tudoran was editor in chief of Democracy at Large, a publication of that organization; currently, he is Senior Director for Communications and Research at IFES.

He is a frequent editorialist, commentator and analyst in a wide variety of international media outlets, including The MacNeil/Lehrer NewsHour, 20 Minutes, CNN, ABC, CBS, NBC, International Herald Tribune, Partisan Review, Journal of Democracy, Le Monde, The Washington Post, The Washington Times, Orbis, The Hartford Courant, El País, Index on Censorship, Kontinent, C-SPAN, BBC, Radio France Internationale, Deutsche Welle, RAI, National Public Radio, ARD-Munich, VPRO-Amsterdam, and Radio Free Europe.

=== Back to Romania ===
After the Romanian Revolution of 1989, Tudoran returned to Romania in 1990 as an envoy of IFES; he later worked as country director for the IFES office in Chișinău, Moldova. He helped launch two Non-governmental organizations in the region—CENTRAS (Romania) and ADEPT(Moldova)—and serves on their boards of directors.

In recent years, Tudoran was an editorialist for Jurnalul Național. In July 2006, Camelia Voiculescu, the owner of the newspaper, asked for his resignation, following an editorial in which Tudoran criticized her father, Dan Voiculescu, for his past association with the Securitate. Since August, 2006, Tudoran is an editorialist for Ziua.

A part of Tudoran's Securitate file was published in Romania in 2010 under the title Eu, fiul lor (English: I, Their Son), just around 500 pages among the nearly 10,000 pages in his file found in the Securitate archives.

=== Recognition ===
Tudoran won the Writers' Union of Romania prize in 1973, 1977, and 1998; the grand prize of the Professional Writers' Association – ASPRO in 1998; the Writers' Union of the Republic of Moldova prize in 1998; the prize "Superlativele anului" from Cuvîntul in 1998; and the ALA prize in 2001.

In 2020, in honor of his 75 birthday, Romanian President Klaus Iohannis awarded him the Order of the Star of Romania, Knight rank.

He is a member of the French and American PEN Clubs, the Romanian-American Academy of Arts and Sciences, and the Writers' Union of Romania; he is also an Associate Scholar with the Foreign Policy Research Institute. On March 25, 2005, he was conferred the title of "Citizen of Honor" by the Municipal Council of Timișoara.

== Works ==
- Mic tratat de glorie, Bucharest: Cartea Românească, 1973. OCLC 80658181
- Cântec de trecut Akheronul, Bucharest: Cartea Românească, 1975. OCLC 81080554
- Frost or fear?: reflections on the condition of the Romanian intellectual (translated into English and with introduction by Vladimir Tismăneanu), Daphne, Alabama: Europa Media Inc., 1988. ISBN 0-936993-50-2
- Kakistocrația, Chișinău: Editura ARC, 1998. ISBN 9975-61-051-X
- Optional future: selected poems (translated into English by Marcel Cornis-Pope), Bucharest: Romanian Cultural Foundation Publishing House, 1999. ISBN 973-577-193-4
- Tînărul Ulise: antologie, Bucharest: Polirom, 2000. ISBN 973-683-388-7
- Absurdistan: o tragedie cu ieșire la mare, Iași: Polirom, 2006. ISBN 973-46-0241-1
- Eu, fiul lor. Dosar de securitate, 2010
- Pisicuț (Somnografii), 2011.

== Prizes ==
- 1992 – Premiul Special al Uniunii Scriitorilor din România ("Special Prize of the Romanian Writers' Union")
- 2001 – Premiul Adevărul Literar și Artistic (Literary and Artistic Truth Prize)
- 2009 – Premiul Național de Poezie "Mihai Eminescu" – Opera Omnia ("Mihai Eminescu National Poetry Prize")
