= Michael Radu =

American journalist

- Born: April 29, 1947
- Died: March 25, 2009 (aged 61)
- Education: Babeș-Bolyai University; Columbia University
- Occupations: political scientist journalist

Mihai S. Radu (April 29, 1947 – March 25, 2009) was a Romanian American political scientist and journalist who grew up in Romania. He was Senior Fellow at the Foreign Policy Research Institute in Philadelphia, Pennsylvania and Co-Chairman of FPRI's Center on Terrorism, Counter-Terrorism, and Homeland Security.

== Early life and education ==
Radu was born in Romania on April 29, 1947. Michael's mother had been born in Rockford, Illinois to Romanian immigrants. Radu was educated at the Babeș-Bolyai University in Cluj (1965–1975) before emigrating to the United States in 1976. He earned his PhD in international relations from Columbia University in 1992, focusing on Africa. He was a visiting senior lecturer on African politics at the University of the Witwatersrand in Johannesburg.

== Career ==
Radu studied terrorist and insurgent groups worldwide from the mid-1980s until his death in 2009. He monitored the 1993 election in Cambodia, as well as elections in Romania, Peru, and Guatemala. He was a National Peace Fellow at the Hoover Institution on War, Revolution and Peace.

Radu was the author or editor of twelve books on international affairs and a member of the International Advisory Board of the Review of International Law and Politics. His writings have appeared in The Wall Street Journal, The New York Times, Newsweek, and Associated Press. He has also contributed articles in the Romanian newspapers România Liberă and Cotidianul.

Michael Radu died on March 25, 2009, at the age of 61.

== Selected publications ==
- Radu, Michael (1981). Eastern Europe and the Third World: East vs. South. New York: Praeger. ISBN 0-275-90708-2.
- Radu, Michael (1988). Violence and the Latin American revolutionaries. New Brunswick, N.J: Transaction Books. ISBN 0-88738-195-2.
- Tismăneanu, Vladimir; Radu, Michael (1990). Latin American revolutionaries: groups, goals, methods. Washington: Pergamon-Brassey's International Defense Publishers. ISBN 0-08-037429-8.
- Arnold, Anthony; Radu, Michael (1990). The New insurgencies: anticommunist guerrillas in the Third World. New Brunswick, N.J., U.S.A: Transaction Publishers. ISBN 0-88738-307-6.
- Klinghoffer, Arthur Jay; Radu, Michael (1991). The dynamics of Soviet policy in sub-Saharan Africa. New York: Holmes & Meier. ISBN 0-8419-1226-2.
- Radu, Michael (2003). Dangerous neighborhood: contemporary issues in Turkey's foreign relations. New Brunswick, N.J., U.S.A: Transaction Publishers. ISBN 0-7658-0166-3.
- Radu, Michael (2006). Dilemmas of democracy & dictatorship: place, time, and ideology in global perspective. New Brunswick, N.J: Transaction Publishers. ISBN 0-7658-0313-5.
- Radu, Michael (2006). Islamic And Terrorist Groups In Asia (The Growth and Influence of Islam in the Nations of Asia and Central Asia). Philadelphia: Mason Crest Publishers. ISBN 1-59084-834-9.
- Radu, Michael (2009). Islam in Europe (World of Islam). Philadelphia: Mason Crest Books. ISBN 978-1-4222-1366-7.
- Radu, Michael (2010). Europe's Ghost: Tolerance, Jihadism, and the Crisis in the West. San Francisco: Encounter Books. ISBN 978-1-59403-262-2.
