= Seliște, Orhei =

Seliște
- Commune
- Location in Moldova
- Coordinates: 47°20′20″N 28°41′4″E
- Country: Moldova
- District: Orhei District

Population (2014)
  - Total: 4,049
- Time zone: UTC+2 (EET)
  - Summer (DST): UTC+3 (EEST)

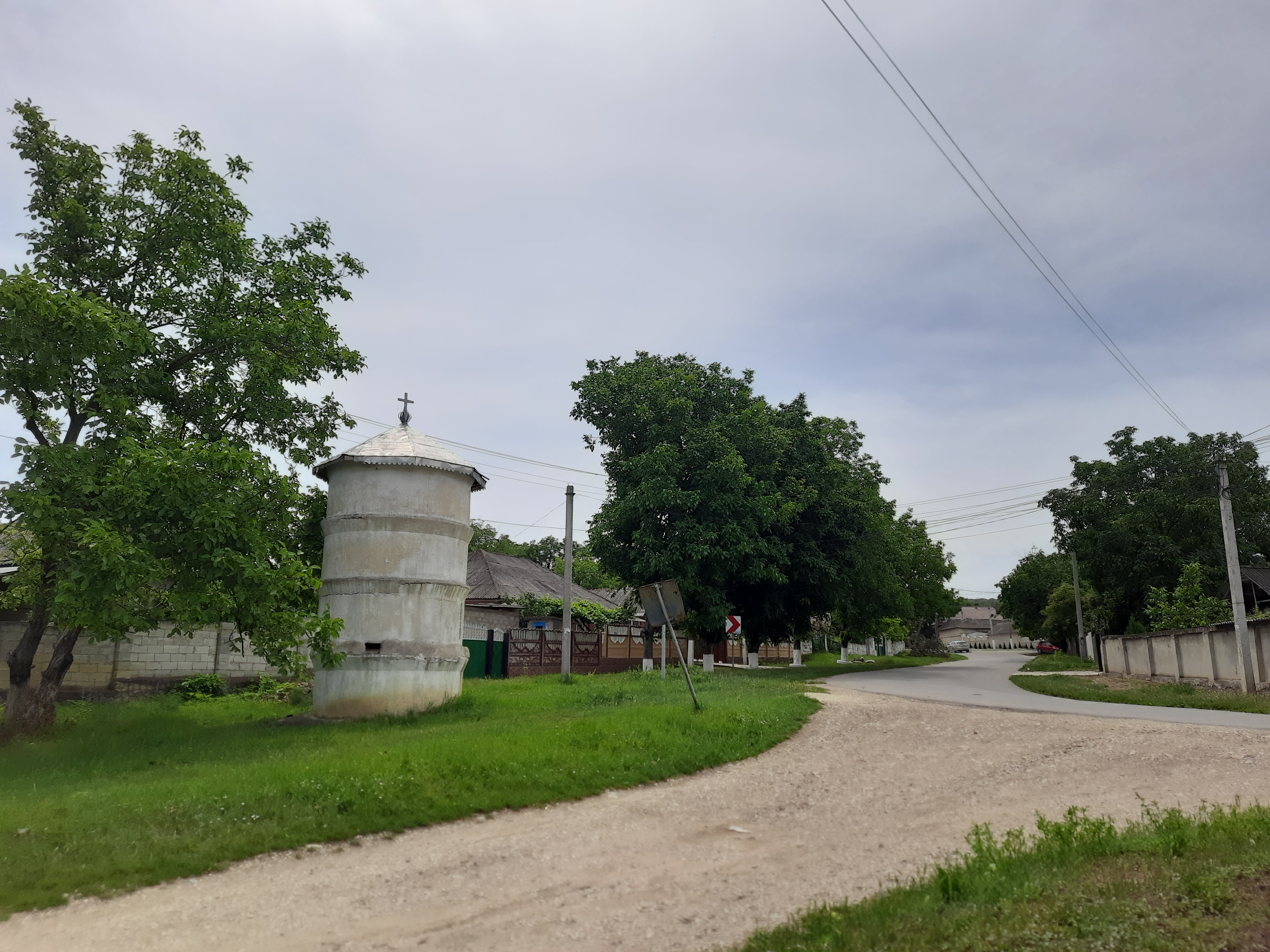
Seliște village, Orhei district, Republic of Moldova

Seliște is a commune in Orhei District, Moldova. It is composed of three villages: Lucășeuca, Mana, and Seliște.

== Notable people ==
- Paul Goma (1935–2020), Romanian writer and dissident.
