= Presidential Commission for the Study of the Communist Dictatorship in Romania =

The Presidential Commission for the Study of the Communist Dictatorship in Romania (Romanian: Comisia Prezidenţială pentru Analiza Dictaturii Comuniste din România), also known as the Tismăneanu Commission (Comisia Tismăneanu), was a commission started in Romania by Romanian President Traian Băsescu to investigate the regime of Communist Romania and to provide a comprehensive report allowing for the condemnation of communism as experienced by Romania.

Formed in April 2006 as a panel headed by the political scientist Vladimir Tismăneanu, it focused on examining the activity of institutions that enforced and perpetuated the communist dictatorship, "the methods making possible the abuses, the murders, the felonies of the dictatorship, the flagrant violations of human rights and the role of some political figures in the maintaining and the functioning of the totalitarian regime in Romania".

The Commission presented its final report to the Romanian Parliament on December 18, 2006. The report has been adopted as an official document of the Romanian Presidency and published on its website. The report made Romania the third former Eastern Bloc country (after the Czech Republic and Bulgaria) that officially condemned its communist regime. The quality, conclusions and choice of commission members of the report are subject to debate in Romanian society. On January 8, 2007, modifications started to be made to the report to correct errors and omissions.

== Members ==
The following members were selected by the commission's President Vladimir Tismăneanu: Sorin Alexandrescu, Sorin Antohi (resigned September 13, 2006), Mihnea Berindei, Metropolitan Nicolae Corneanu (resigned December 2006), Constantin Ticu Dumitrescu, Paul Goma (dismissed April 2006), Radu Filipescu, Virgil Ierunca (died September 28, 2006), Sorin Ilieșiu, Gail Kligman, Monica Lovinescu, Nicolae Manolescu, Marius Oprea, Horia-Roman Patapievici, Dragoș Petrescu, Andrei Pippidi, Romulus Rusan, Levente Salat, Stelian Tănase, Cristian Vasile, and Alexandru Zub.

== Final report ==
=== Pillars, enforcers and supporters of communism ===
The report identifies several individuals as responsible for officially endorsed violent methods. Several of their biographies were reviewed as part of the 660-page report. Among those identified included former Romanian President Ion Iliescu, Romanian Senators Corneliu Vadim Tudor and Adrian Păunescu, and the Commission president's father, Leonte Tismăneanu. In the category comprising those found to be "guilty of enforcing and perpetuating a regime built on crimes" were Gheorghe Gheorghiu-Dej, Ana Pauker, Gheorghe Apostol, Gheorghe Rădulescu, Manea Mănescu and Ion Iliescu. Among those found responsible for political indoctrination were Ion Iliescu, Mihai Roller, Paul Niculescu-Mizil, Valter Roman and Silviu Brucan.

A special category comprises those participants in the cultural life who were found to have actively supported the communist regime. The report mentions Eugen Barbu, Corneliu Vadim Tudor, Dan Zamfirescu, Ion Dodu Bălan, Dinu Săraru, Adrian Păunescu, Ilie Bădescu, Mihai Ungheanu, Nicolae Dan Fruntelată, Artur Silvestri and Ilie Purcaru. The Săptămâna magazine, directed by Eugen Barbu and Corneliu Vadim Tudor, was considered "the main platform for manipulative pseudo-nationalism during the late years of the Ceaușescu regime".

The report mentions Mihai Bujor Sion and Leonte Tismăneanu among the main activists of the Romanian Communist Party. Those identified as involved in the regime's propaganda apparatus are Matei Socor (head of the Agerpres news agency), Paul Niculescu-Mizil, Leonte Răutu, Eugen Florescu and Ion Iliescu. Ghizela Vass and Ștefan Andrei were identified as main agents of the communist regime involved in policies pertaining to external affairs.

In a speech accepting the report, Băsescu denounced the communist regime as "illegitimate and criminal" and said that it used the Romanian people as "guinea pigs for an experiment".

=== Other conclusions ===
The report also contradicts President Băsescu's earlier assertion (a thesis also supported also by the Left-wing and nationalist groupings of the Romanian political spectrum) that the communist secret police, the Securitate, can be divided into two distinct sections: one serving the regime and the other ensuring the nation's security. Vladimir Tismăneanu was quoted by Adevărul as saying:

We [the Commission] reject on a scientific basis the existence of two kinds of Securitate, one of before 1965, for the Comintern and anti-patriotic, and the other one devoted to the people and to the patriotic values.

== Criticism ==
Critics of the report of the Tismăneanu commission do not deny that it does have a considerable merit: it contains factual, informative parts, based on studies conducted by experts and is an important source on the history of the totalitarian Communist Romania.

Critics have focused on three problems: the choice of events and personalities included in the report, the moral authority of the commission members and the conclusions of the report.

=== Choice of events and communist figures ===
Historians Péter Apor, Sándor Horváth and James Mark write that the Commission has "interpreted collaboration in the context of discrediting postcommunist socialists through a militant anti communism. Thus, in Romania, as in most of the countries of the region, the question of collaboration is politicized, permeated with anticommunist views".

The anticommunist dissidents Victor Frunză and Ionel Cana published a protest letter criticising the fact that the report failed to mention Bessarabia and Bukovina, which were the main target of Soviet expansionism. They contend that the pro-Soviet position concerning Bessarabia and Bukovina was one of the main "structural defects of the communist group of Romania". A similar position has been taken by other personalities such as Victor Roncea, president of the Civic Media Association, who denounced the crimes committed by the communists in Soviet-occupied Bessarabia and Bukovina before, during and after the Second World War. The communist repression in both territories was proposed for inclusion in the report by dissident Paul Goma as early as May 2006 in an open letter to Romanian President Traian Băsescu.

The Romanian journalist Ion Cristoiu considers the personalities nominated are perceived as political enemies of Băsescu, who initiated the commission. The writer and Ziua editor Dan Ciachir considers that the choice of events and the conclusions of the report put an undue weight on the relations between the Romanian Orthodox Church with the communist regime, especially in relation with the interdiction of the Romanian Greek Catholic Church.

=== Moral authority of commission ===
Tismăneanu's father, Leonte Tismăneanu, was, according to the report, one of the main propagandists in charge of communist indoctrination. One of the commission's members, Sorin Antohi, was a collaborator of the Securitate who lied about his academic credentials. He is a close collaborator of Tismăneanu and still edits a scientific journal chaired by Tismăneanu. Another member, Metropolitan Nicolae Corneanu, resigned after declaring he was not aware of his nomination to serve on the commission. Mihnea Berindei, also a member, was accused of being a Securitate collaborator. The exiled writer and dissident Paul Goma was invited and later fired from the commission after only nine days by Tismăneanu.

=== Conclusions of report ===
Some critics have noted that condemning a political doctrine is useless because the crimes of the regime should be condemned and dangerous because existing communist states could take it as an attack. Some believe thaf President Traian Băsescu's choice to declare the communist regime as illegitimate on the basis of the report is also dangerous because it may be interpreted as an annulment of all international treaties in which it took part.

The volume Iluzia Anticomunismului summarises a number of critiques, including lack of narrative continuity, poor organization and failure to engage the problem at more than symbolic level. Sorin Adam Matei criticizes the report for its lack of rigor, amalgamation with no obvious plan of various pre-written book chapters and articles, and for adopting as conclusion a document written before the report was even written. He also points to the lack of juridical basis or consequence of the report. He calls for a second edition of the report, a "Report on Communism 2.0" to be documented and rewritten by historians and legal scholars who have a sound understanding of the legal implications of such a document. Michael Shafir pointed to the fact that the language of the report is unsuitable for a historical work and leads to conceptual confusions. He believes that "genocide" is not an appropriate word in the context; that the head of the commission, Tismăneanu, used theories and concepts without proper attribution; and throughout the report, a faulty citation policy has been used. He also noted that the report mixes all victims of the communist regime into a single category and makes no distinction between democratic leaders and former Iron Guard members. Important dissident leaders are also omitted from the report.

On January 8, 2007, modifications to the report corrected some errors and omissions. The legal status of the changes to a final report adopted as an official presidential document is unclear.

=== Other ===
The Tismăneanu report is written in a journalistic, rhetorical, electoral language, in a wooden language analogous to the communist parlance of a "grotesque, self-degrading pathos", which "pushes grandiloquence and snoring tone to indecency".

== See also ==
- Commission for the Study of the Communist Dictatorship in Moldova
