= Institute for the Investigation of Communist Crimes and the Memory of the Romanian Exile =

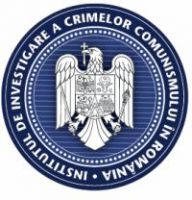
Official logo

Institute for the Investigation of Communist Crimes and the Memory of the Romanian Exile (Romanian: Institutul de Investigare a Crimelor Comunismului şi Memoria Exilului Românesc, IICCMER), formerly Institute for the Investigation of Communist Crimes in Romania, is a government-sponsored organization whose mission is to investigate the crimes and abuses conducted while Romania was under communist rule, prior to December 1989. Following the Romanian Revolution, Romania’s Communist government was overthrown and a democratic president was elected in May 1990.

The main objectives of the Institute are the gathering of data, documents and testimonies regarding all oppressive actions exerted by the system, and notifying the state’s criminal investigation departments. In addition, the Institute informs the public of the crimes, abuses and instigations to crime, conducted in the name of "class struggle" by the powerful people within the communist system. The Institute was led for many years by Marius Oprea, president, a University of Bucharest graduate with a PhD in history, who is an archeologist and historian; since January 2020, it is being led by Alexandra Toader.

The institute is a member organisation of the Platform of European Memory and Conscience.

== News ==
According to a 2006 report presented to Romanian President Traian Băsescu, up to one million people were killed or persecuted by communist authorities in Romania.

In December 2009, France 24, the French-based news agency, reported on the Institute’s progress in documenting the communist crimes in Romania, including finding the buried remains of some of the many thousands of people alleged to have been murdered.

== International partners ==
The Institute has cooperation agreements with the Institute of National Remembrance and the Institute for the Study of Totalitarian Regimes, government agencies of Poland and the Czech Republic, respectively, tasked with the investigation of Nazi and Communist crimes.

== See also ==
- Commission for the Study of the Communist Dictatorship in Moldova
- Memorial of the Victims of Communism and of the Resistance
- Presidential Commission for the Study of the Communist Dictatorship in Romania
