= Leonte Tismăneanu =

Romanian communist activist and propagandist

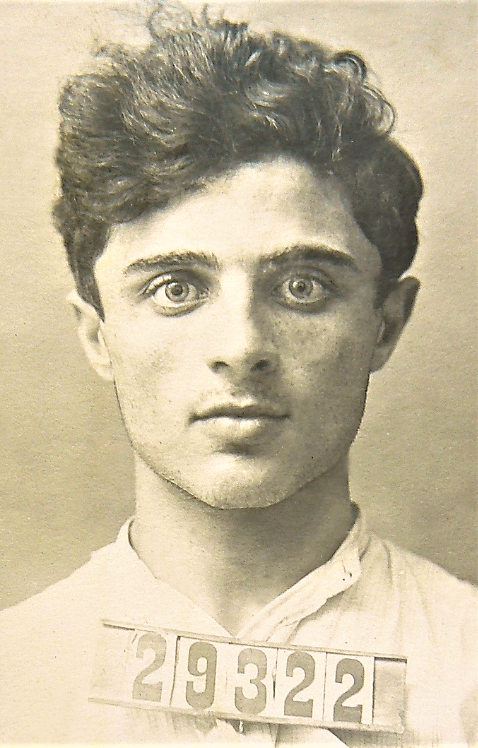
- Mug shot taken by the Siguranța in the 1930's
- Born: Leonid Tisminetski; 1913; Soroca, Russian Empire
- Died: 1981 (aged 67–68); Otopeni, Socialist Republic of Romania
- Education: Moscow State Linguistic University
- Political party: Romanian Communist Party
- Spouse: Hermina Marcusohn
- Children: Vladimir Tismăneanu
- Military Service
- Allegiance: (Second Spanish Republic) Spanish Republic
- Branch: Spanish Republican Army
- Unit: International Brigades
- Conflicts: Spanish Civil War (WIA)

Leonte Tismăneanu (born Leonid Tisminetski, or Tisminețki; 1913–1981) was a Romanian communist activist and propagandist.

Born into a Jewish family in Soroca, Bessarabia, Russian Empire (now in Moldova), he joined the Romanian Communist Party (PCR) in the early 1930s. He engaged in illegal communist activities in Bucharest, Galați, Brăila, and Soroca. Later, he fought as a volunteer in the International Brigades during the Spanish Civil War, losing his right arm at the age of 24. In 1939, Tisminetski left for the Soviet Union, where he became a student of the Moscow State Linguistic University. After the start of Operation Barbarossa, in which Romania took part (see Romania during World War II), he worked with Ana Pauker, Leonte Răutu, and Vasile Luca for the Romanian language branch of Radio Moscow, first as a newsreader, then as a writer.

In 1948, Tisminetski and his family were sent to Soviet-occupied Romania, where he changed his name in 1949 to Leonte Tismăneanu, at the request of the PCR. He was named deputy director of Editura PMR, later Editura Politică, the publishing house of the Communist Party and also held the Chair of Marxism-Leninism at the University of Bucharest.

In 1956, Tismăneanu, alongside Dean Iorgu Iordan and the academics Mihai Novicov, Alexandru Graur, Ion Coteanu, and Radu Florian, took part in a university inquiry into the anti-communist statements of Paul Goma, a university student who later became a noted dissident and writer; led by Iordan and supervised by the Securitate, the investigation culminated in Goma's expulsion from the faculty and subsequent arrest (Tismăneanu and Florian voted in favor of the former, but against the latter).

Between 1958 and 1960, Tismăneanu was investigated for "revisionist-type deviationism" (deviaționism de tip revizionist), the inquiry ending with him being expelled from the Party in 1960. Allowed to rejoin the party in 1964 by Gheorghe Gheorghiu-Dej himself, he subsequently worked as a writer for Editura Meridiane. Leonte Tismaneanu died in February 1981 of heart attack in a hospital in Otoprni, near Bucharest. .

He was married to Hermina Marcusohn, herself a Spanish Civil War veteran who had trained as a physician, held a professorship at Bucharest's Medical School, and briefly worked as a party activist. Their son, Vladimir Tismăneanu, is a political scientist, who headed the Presidential Commission for the Study of the Communist Dictatorship in Romania, which presented a report on the crimes of the communist regime in Romania. In an extended polemic with Vladimir Tismăneanu, Goma has indicated his mistrust in the latter's ability to exercise impartial judgment, allegedly calling him "a Bolshevik offspring".

The Final Report of the Presidential Commission lists Leonte Tismăneanu among the group of prominent party activists responsible with indoctrination.
