= Marc Morjé Howard =

American legal academic and author

- Education: Yale University (BA); University of California, Berkeley (MA, PhD); Georgetown University Law Center (JD)
- Occupations: Professor, author
- Employer: Georgetown University
- Title: Professor of Government; Professor of Law; Director of the Prisons and Justice Initiative
- Website: www.marcmhoward.com

Marc Morjé Howard is Professor of Government and Law at Georgetown University. Howard is a noted author and a leading supporter of criminal justice and prison reform.

== Early life and career ==
Howard grew up in Port Jefferson, New York, the son of a French librarian mother and American philosopher father. As a child, Howard spent summers in Normandy with his grandparents and is a native speaker of both English and French.

In 1993, Howard graduated from Yale University with a B.A. in Ethics, Politics, and Economics. He received two degrees in political science from the University of California, Berkeley, an M.A. in 1995 and a Ph.D. in 1999. While a student, he lived and researched in Germany for several years and in Russia for nearly one year, and he is fluent in German and Russian. Howard briefly taught at the University of California, Santa Cruz and at the University of Maryland, College Park from 2000 to 2003.

Since 2003, Howard has been a professor in Georgetown's Department of Government. He received a J.D. in 2012 and a courtesy appointment as Professor of Law in 2014 from the Georgetown University Law Center. In 2016, Howard founded the Georgetown University Prisons and Justice Initiative (PJI), which brings together scholars, practitioners, and students to study the problem of mass incarceration.

He is the author of the book, The Weakness of Civil Society in Post-Communist Europe. He also wrote The Politics of Citizenship in Europe, in 2009. Howard is also the author of the book Unusually Cruel: Prisons, Punishment, and the Real American Exceptionalism, which was published by Oxford University Press in 2017.

== Prison reform work ==
Howard is a prominent supporter of criminal justice and prison reform in the United States. He became involved in prison reform through the case of his high school classmate, Marty Tankleff. In 1988, at age 17, Tankleff falsely confessed and was convicted of murdering his parents. Howard visited Tankleff in 2004 and began helping him win his release. In 2007, after 17 years in prison, Tankleff was exonerated and released when an appellate court overturned his conviction.

Howard started teaching a course called "Prisons and Punishment" at Georgetown in 2011. The course featured a tour of the Jessup Correctional Institution, a maximum-security prison in Maryland, as well as a meeting and conversation with a group of "lifers" at Jessup. In 2014, Howard began teaching a full course to inmates at Jessup as part of the JCI Scholars Program.

== Publications ==
- The Weakness of Civil Society in Post-Communist Europe. Cambridge University Press, 2003.
- World Order After Leninism. University of Washington Press, 2006 (co-edited with Vladimir Tismaneanu and Rudra Sil).
- The Politics of Citizenship in Europe. Cambridge University Press, 2009.
- Unusually Cruel: Prisons, Punishment, and the Real American Exceptionalism. Oxford University Press, 2017 (forthcoming).
