= Paul Goma =

Romanian writer (1935–2020)

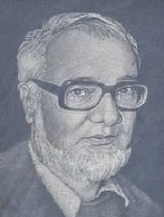
- Born: October 2, 1935; Mana, Kingdom of Romania
- Died: March 24, 2020 (aged 84); Paris, France
- Citizenship: Romania (1935–1977); Moldova (since 2013)
- Occupations: Writer and dissident
- Writing career
- Years active: 1966–2020
- Website: paulgoma.com

Paul Goma (Romanian pronunciation: [ˈpa.ul ˈɡoma]; October 2, 1935 – March 24, 2020) was a Romanian writer, known for his activities as a dissident and leading opponent of the communist regime before 1989. Forced into exile by the communist authorities, he became a political refugee and resided in France as a stateless person. After 2000, Goma expressed opinions on World War II, the Holocaust in Romania and the Jews, claims which have led to widespread allegations of antisemitism.

== Biography ==
=== Early life ===
Goma was born to a Romanian family in Mana village, Orhei County, then in the Kingdom of Romania, now part of Moldova.

In March 1944, the Goma family took refuge in Sibiu, Transylvania. In August 1944, finding themselves in danger of involuntary "repatriation" to the Soviet Union, they fled to the village of Buia, by the Târnava Mare River. From October to December 1944, the family hid in the forests around Buia. On January 13, 1945, they were captured by Romanian shepherds and turned over to the Gendarmerie in Sighișoara, where they were interned at the "Centrul de Repatriere" ("Repatriation Center"). There, Eufimie Goma forged documents for his family; however, Maria Goma's brother, who didn't have forged papers, was "repatriated to Siberia". In June 1945, taking advantage of the forged documents, they returned to Buia. Later on, Paul Goma would describe his family's refugee saga in the novels Arta refugii ("The Art of Refuge", a wordplay on the Romanian words for "refuge" and "taking flight"), Soldatul câinelui ("Dog's Soldier"), and Gardă inversă ("Reverse Guard").

=== Dissident in Romania ===
Goma graduated from Făgăraș' Radu Negru High School in 1953. In 1954, he was admitted to the Faculty of Letters of the University of Bucharest. In November 1956, he was part of the Bucharest student movement of 1956: during a seminar, he read out to other students parts of a novel he had written about a student who establishes a movement that is similar to the ones in Hungary during the Hungarian Revolution of 1956. Goma was arrested on the charge of attempting to organize a strike at the University of Bucharest and he was sentenced to two years in prison. He served his sentence at the prisons in Jilava and Gherla, and then was put under house arrest in Lătești (a former village of the Bordușani commune) until 1963.

As a former political prisoner, he was not allowed to resume his studies and he had to work as a manual labourer until 1965 when a decree allowed former prisoners to study at the university. In September 1965, he was re-admitted as a first-year student at the Faculty of Letters of the University of Bucharest.

At the end of August 1968, Goma became a member of the Romanian Communist Party, in an act of solidarity with the Romanian position during the Warsaw Pact Invasion of Czechoslovakia (Romania did not take part, indeed condemning the invasion).

Several months later, Goma attempted to publish a novel, Ostinato (based on his experiences with the secret police), but it was not allowed by the censors after one of them claimed to recognize one character as Elena Ceaușescu. Nevertheless, he published the novel in translation in West Germany in 1971, as a result of which, Paul Goma was excluded from the Communist Party.

During the summer of 1972, he was allowed to visit France, where he wrote Gherla, a novel based on his experiences in the Gherla Prison. This book was also denied publication in Romania but was published in France in 1976.

=== Goma's 1977 letters ===
In 1977, Goma wrote a public letter expressing solidarity with the Charter 77, but, finding few friends willing to sign it, he wrote another letter, addressed directly to Ceaușescu, in which he asked him to sign it, as the two of them (Goma and Ceaușescu) were the only Romanians not afraid of the Securitate. Following this, he wrote another letter (addressed to the 35 countries in the CSCE) in which he called for respect for human rights in Romania.

In February 1977, Romania's dictator Nicolae Ceaușescu made a speech in which he attacked the "traitors of the country", referring to the two letters Goma wrote. The following day, a police cordon was in front of his building, not allowing non-residents, to prevent people from signing Goma's letter. The authorities tried to convince Goma to emigrate, but he refused. As the police cordon got more relaxed, several more people signed the letter and they were arrested on exiting Goma's apartment.

In March, he wrote an even tougher admonitory letter to Nicolae Ceaușescu, urging him not to break the bond between the people and him, a bond that was created after Ceaușescu condemned the invasion of Czechoslovakia, and attacked the Securitate whom Goma said were "traitors and enemies of Romania, who produce nothing and prevent those who produce from producing more". In the meantime, Goma gained the support of two intellectuals: psychiatrist Ion Vianu and literary critic Ion Negoițescu; in all, he had 75 signatures.

Called by Cornel Burtică, the Secretary for Propaganda of the Central Committee, on March 12, Goma got the promise of being allowed to publish again, but he refused as he said that he wants not to be followed by the Securitate. A week later, a former boxer, Horst Stump, broke into Goma's flat and attacked him; the attacks repeated the following days. As he was barricading himself with some friends in his apartment, he gave an interview to French TV station Antenne 2.

Goma was arrested and excluded from the Writers' Union of Romania. Following his arrest, he was attacked in the Romanian media: in a Săptămîna article, Eugen Barbu called him "a nullity", in Luceafărul, Nicolae Dragoș said he was "rousing reactionary elements" and in Contemporanul, Vasile Băran, not mentioning Goma, claimed that "individuals calling themselves writers and journalists sully with the dirtiest of dirt our noble profession".

An international appeal for his release was launched, among the signatories being Eugène Ionesco, Jean-Paul Sartre, Arthur Miller and Edward Albee. Goma was released on 6 May 1977, four days before the anniversary of 100 years of Romanian independence, celebrations which Ceaușescu didn't want to be overshadowed by Goma's arrest.

On November 20, 1977, Goma and his family left Romania and went into exile in France.

=== Exile in France ===
On 3 February 1981, Goma and Nicolae Penescu (former Interior Minister) received parcels in their post. Penescu opened his parcel to find a book and when he lifted its cover an explosion wounded him. Goma, who had received two death threats since his arrival in France, called the police. Both packages had been sent on instructions by Carlos the Jackal.

In 1982, the Securitate planned to assassinate Goma. Matei Haiducu, the secret agent sent by the Securitate to carry out the plan, turned to French counter-intelligence (DST). With the help of the DST, Haiducu simulated an attempt on Goma's life, by poisoning his drink at a restaurant; the drink was then spilled by a French agent, pretending to be a "clumsy guest".

Although Goma's numerous works (both fiction and non-fiction) were translated worldwide, his books, except the first one, were published in Romania only after the 1989 Revolution. He lived in Paris as a stateless political refugee, his Romanian citizenship having been revoked after 1978 by the communist government.

=== Death ===
On March 18, 2020, Paul Goma was hospitalized at Pitié-Salpêtrière Hospital in Paris after being infected with COVID-19 and died on March 24, 2020. He was 84.

=== Controversies ===
Michael Shafir described Goma as a "deflective negationist", i.e. as blaming the victims of the Holocaust in Romania for their own fate. Goma did not deny the crimes against the Jews, but considered those crimes as "legitimate revenge", he maintained that "those atrocities were exclusively committed out of an urge to avenge, in circumstances specific to wartime, the earlier murders committed by the Jews."

Despite the fact that his wife is Jewish, some of Goma's post-2005 articles and essays have been criticized for their strong antisemitic nature. In particular, in his "essay" Săptămâna Roșie [The Red Week], he tried to rewrite the Romanian history of the years 1940–1944, claiming that the Jews exaggerated the numbers of the victims of the Romanian holocaust, that communist Jews made things up and that Jews were not the victims, but the perpetrators of several of the heinous crimes of those times, using thus strategies common to holocaust denial. Goma rejects these criticisms and claims that he has filed libel lawsuits against his accusers. He asserted that his wife was Jewish and stated that similar arguments were used against him by the Securitate in the 1980s. On January 30, 2007, Goma was awarded the "Citizen of Honor" distinction by the Municipal Council of Timișoara. In February 2007, the Federation of Jewish Communities of Romania and the Israeli Embassy protested against the distinction, arguing that Paul Goma was the author of multiple antisemitic articles.

On April 5, 2006 he was invited to become a member of the Tismăneanu Commission, a body charged with researching the crimes of the communist dictatorship in Romania. Nine days later he was dismissed by the Commission's president, Vladimir Tismăneanu, who explained the exclusion based on Goma's questioning the moral and scientific credibility of the president of the Commission, and disclosing of their private correspondence.

== Literary contributions ==
Goma's literary debut came in 1966 with a short story published in the review Luceafărul with which he collaborated as well as with Gazeta literară, Viața românească and Ateneu. In 1968 he published his first volume of stories, Camera de alături ("The Room Next Door"). After Ostinato and its West German publication in 1971 came Ușa ("Die Tür" or "The Door") in 1972, also in Germany. After his forced emigration in 1977 and until his books could again be published in Romania after the 1989 revolution, all his books appeared in France and in French. (His novel Gherla had in fact been published in 1976 first in French by Gallimard of Paris before he left Romania.) There followed such novels as Dans le cercle ("Within the Circle", 1977); Garde inverse ("Reverse Guard", 1979); Le Tremblement des Hommes ("The Trembling of People", 1979); Chassée-croisé ("Intersection", 1983); Les Chiens de la mort ("The Dogs of Death", 1981), which details his prison experiences in Pitești in the 1950s; and Bonifacia (1986). The autobiographical Le Calidor appeared in French in 1987 and was subsequently published in Romanian as Din Calidor: O copilărie basarabeană ("In Calidor: A Bessarabian Childhood", 1989, 1990; translated as My Childhood at the Gate of Unrest) in the Romanian émigré journal Dialog, edited by Ion Solacolu.

In its totality, Goma's literary work comprises a "persuasive and grimly fascinating exposure of totalitarian inhumanity" from which, in his own case, even foreign exile was no guarantee of a safe haven. In such later novels as Bonifacia and My Childhood at the Gate of Unrest, the biographical element dominates as he focuses on his childhood in Bessarabia. Several sets of diaries, all published in Romania in 1997 and 1998, shed light on Goma's later life and career: Alte Jurnale ("Other Journals"), which covers his stay in the United States in autumn 1978 but concentrates primarily on 1994–96; Jurnal I: Jurnal pe sărite ("Journal I: By Leaps and Bounds", 1997); Jurnal II: Jurnal de căldură mare ("Journal II: Journal of Great Heat", 1997), covering June and July 1989; Jurnal III: Jurnal de noapte lungă ("Journal of the Long Night", 1997), covering September to December 1993; and Jurnalul unui jurnal 1997 ("The Journal of a Journal, 1997"), focusing just on that year.

== Published works ==
- (in Romanian) Camera de alături, Bucharest, 1968.
- (in German) Ostinato, Suhrkamp, Frankfurt am Main, 1971. ISBN 3-518-06638-2
  - (in French) La Cellule des libérables, Éditions Gallimard, Paris, 1971. ISBN 2-07-028096-9
  - (in Dutch) Ostinato, Bruna & Zoon, Utrecht, 1974.
  - (in Romanian) Ostinato, Editura Univers, 1992. ISBN 973-34-0215-X
- (in German) Die Tür, 1972.
  - (in French) Elles étaient quatre, Éditions Gallimard, Paris, 1974.
  - (in Romanian) Ușa noastră cea de toate zilele, Editura Cartea Românească, Bucharest, 1992.
- (in French) Gherla, Éditions Gallimard, Paris, 1976.
  - (in Swedish) Gherla, 1978.
  - (in Romanian) Gherla, Humanitas, Bucharest, 1990. ISBN 973-28-0169-7
- (in French) Dossier Paul Goma. L'écrivain face au socialisme du silence., Paris, 1977
- (in French) Dans le cercle, Éditions Gallimard, Paris, 1977. ISBN 2-07-029709-8
  - (in Romanian) In cerc, 1995.
- (in French) Garde inverse, Éditions Gallimard, Paris, 1979.
  - (in Romanian) Gardă inversă, Univers, 1997. ISBN 973-34-0409-8
- (in French) Le Tremblement des Hommes: peut-on vivre en Roumanie aujourd'hui?, Éditions du Seuil, Paris, 1979. ISBN 2-02-005101-X.
  - (in Dutch) 1980.
  - (in Romanian) Culorile curcubeului '77, Humanitas, Bucharest, 1990. ISBN 973-28-0174-3
  - (in Romanian) Culoarea curcubeului '77. Cod "Bărbosul", Polirom, 2005. ISBN 973-681-833-0
- (in French) Les chiens de mort, ou, La passion selon Pitești, Hachette, Paris, 1981. ISBN 2-01-008309-1
  - (in Dutch) Het vierkante ei, Elsevier Manteau, Antwerp, 1983.
  - (in German) Die rote Messe, Thule, Köln, 1984.
  - (in Romanian) Patimile după Pitești, 1990.
  - (in Romanian) Patimile după Pitești, Dacia, 1999. ISBN 973-35-0845-4
- (in French) Chassé-croise, Hachette, Paris, 1983.
  - (in Romanian) Soldatul câinelui, Humanitas, Bucharest, 1991. ISBN 973-28-0235-9
- (in French) Le calidor, Albin Michel, 1987.
  - (in Romanian) Din calidor, 1989.
  - (in English) My Childhood at the Gate of Unrest, Readers International, July 1990. ISBN 0-930523-74-1
  - (in Romanian) Din calidor: O copilărie basarabeană, Polirom, 2004. ISBN 973-681-732-6
- (in French) L'art de la fugue, Julliard, 1990. ISBN 2-260-00635-3
  - (in Romanian) Arta refugii, Editura Dacia, Cluj, 1991. ISBN 973-35-0225-1
  - (in Romanian) Arta refugii, Editura Basarabian, Chișinău, 1995.
- (in Romanian) Sabina, 1991.
  - (in French) Sabina, 1993.
  - (in Romanian) Sabina, Universal Dalsi, Bucharest, 2005. ISBN 973-691-031-8
- (in French) Astra, 1992.
  - (in Romanian) Astra, Editura Dacia, 1992.
- (in Romanian) Bonifacia, 1993.
- (in French) Bonifacia, Albin Michel 1998. ISBN 2-226-02589-8
  - (in Romanian) Bonifacia, Anamarol, 2006. ISBN 973-8931-18-5
- (in Romanian) Adameva, Loreley, Iași, 1995. (not distributed)
- (in Romanian) Amnezia la români, Litera, 1995.
- (in Romanian) Scrisori întredeschise – singur impotriva lor, Multiprint "Familia", Oradea, 1995.
- (in Romanian) Justa Editura Nemira, Bucharest, 1995.
- (in Romanian) Jurnal pe sărite, Editura Nemira, Bucharest, 1997
- (in Romanian) Jurnal de căldura mare, Edutura Nemira, Bucharest, 1997
- (in Romanian) Altina – grădina scufundată, Editura Cartier, Chișinău, 1998.
- (in Romanian) Scrisuri. 1972–1998, Editura Nemira, Bucharest, 1999. ISBN 973-569-377-1
- (in Romanian) Roman intim, Editura Allfa, 1999. ISBN 973-9477-06-2
- (in Romanian) Jurnal de Noapte Lungă, Dacia, Bucharest, 2000.
- (in Romanian) Jurnal unui jurnal, Dacia, Cluj, 2000.
- (in Romanian) Jurnal de Apocrif, Dacia, Cluj, 2000.
- (in French) Profil bas, Des Syrtes, 2001. ISBN 2845450389
- (in Romanian) Săptămîna Roșie. 28 Iunie–3 Iulie 1940 sau Basarabia și evreii, Museum, Chișinău, 2003. ISBN 978-9975-906-77-7
- (in Romanian) Jurnal, Criterion, Bucharest, 2004. ISBN 978-973-86850-8-6
- (in Romanian) Alfabecedar, Editura Victor Frunză, 2005.

== Awards and honours ==
- "Chevalier dans l'ordre des Arts et des Lettres" (France), 1986
- Writers' Union of Moldova's Prize for Prose, March, 1992.
- Writers' Union of Romania's Prize for Prose, May 25, 1992.
- "Honorary Citizen" by the Municipal Council of Timișoara, January 30, 2007.
