= Cotidianul =

Romanian newspaper

- Type: Daily newspaper
- Format: Berliner
- Owner(s): Academia Cațavencu, through Realitatea-Cațavencu
- Editor-in-chief: Cornel Nistorescu
- Editor: Doru Bușcu
- Founded: 1927 re-founded in 1991 re-launched in 2003
- City: Bucharest
- Country: Romania
- Website: www.cotidianul.ro

Old logo of Cotidianul newspaper, used in the inter-war period, and in the early 1990s

The logo used between 2003 and 2007

Cotidianul (meaning The Daily in English) is a Romanian-language newspaper published in Bucharest, Romania.

== History and profile ==
Founded by Ion Rațiu, Cotidianul was first published on 10 May 1991 and was the first privately held newspaper in Romania following the Romanian Revolution of 1989. The paper had its headquarters in Bucharest. It was published Monday to Saturday in Berliner format.

Cotidianul ceased print publication on 23 December 2009 due to financial difficulties, but remained active as an online news source. The owners announced that the closure was temporary due to insolvency, but no buyers was found.

Since November 2016 the newspaper has appeared again in print.

== Notable contributors ==
- Cătălin Avramescu
- Adrian Cioroianu
- Andrei Marga
- Ioan T. Morar
- Cornel Nistorescu
- Octavian Paler
- Ovidiu Pecican
- Valerian Stan
- Vladimir Tismăneanu
- Robert Turcescu
- Traian Ungureanu
- Ioan Vieru
- Sever Voinescu
