= Sfera Politicii =

Sfera Politicii ((in Romanian) for "The Political Sphere") is a monthly political science magazine, published in Romania since 1991.

== History and profile ==
Sfera Politicii was first published in December 1991. The magazine is based in Bucharest. Its articles, written in both English and Romanian, deal with diverse issues in local and international politics.

Sfera Politicii was established by Stelian Tănase around the Civic Society Foundation (Fundaţia "Societatea Civilă", which was headed by Alexandru Paleologu until his death in 2005) and the Institute for Economic and Political Research (Institutul de Cercetări Economice şi Politice).
