= Ziua =

Newspaper

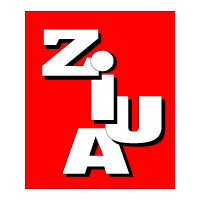
- The old logo, used until 2006
- Type: Print
- Format: Berliner
- Publisher: Sorin Roșca-Stănescu (1994-2008)
- Editor-in-chief: Roland Cătălin Pena / Adrian Pătrușcă
- Editor: Adina Anghelescu, Victor Roncea, Miruna Munteanu, Doru Dragomir, Cătălin Vărzaru, Răzvan Savaliuc, George Damian, Vladimir Alexe, Laura Dushka, Rene Pârșan, Mihai Toader, Marius Gherghe, Cezar Ioan
- Founded: 1930
- Language: Romanian
- Ceased publication: 2010
- Headquarters: Strada Mille 17
- City: Bucharest
- Country: Romania
- Circulation: 12,000
- Website: www.ziua.ro

Ziua (Romanian pronunciation: [ˈziwa] , The Day) was a major Romanian daily newspaper published in Bucharest. It was published in Romanian, with a fairly sizeable and often informative English section. Ziua was founded in 1994 by Sorin Roșca Stănescu, eventually becoming foreign-owned. It was the most conservative of the major Romanian dailies, often taking a Christian-nationalist point of view in its opinion pieces.

The website of the paper, in addition to featuring almost all the contents of the Romanian edition, featured a daily selection of articles translated into English. Moreover, Ziua's website featured one of the most complete free online newspaper archives in Romania, stretching back to January 1998.

There used to be several regional editions of the paper, including Ziua de Vest, Ziua de Iași, Ziua de Constanța, and Ziua de Cluj. These newspapers either survive as stand-alone spin-offs, with independent editorial supervision, or have been sold (and subsequently renamed).

The last edition of the newspaper was printed on 7 January 2010, the last front-page editorial quoting unsustainable mounting losses coupled with a general economic recession. The same editorial promised that only the print edition of the newspaper will be shut down, the online edition continuing to be produced. However, the last update to the website's content occurred at 21:00 on 7 January, with a final update on 12 January replacing the front page with a message announcing that the newspaper has completely ceased to exist.
