= Ruxandra Cesereanu =

Romanian poet, essayist, short story writer, novelist, and literary critic

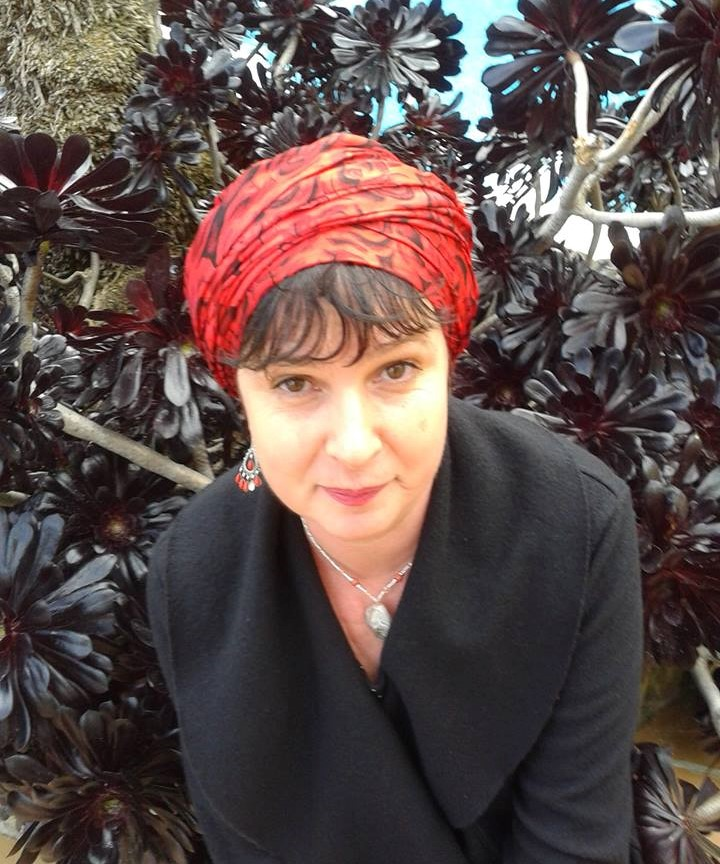
Ruxandra-Mihaela Cesereanu

Ruxandra-Mihaela Cesereanu or Ruxandra-Mihaela Braga (born August 17, 1963) is a Romanian poet, essayist, short story writer, novelist, and literary critic. Also known as a journalist, academic, literary historian and film critic, Cesereanu holds a teaching position at the Babeș-Bolyai University (UBB), and is an editor for the magazine Steaua in Cluj-Napoca.

The author of several proses and poetry volumes, Cesereanu became noted for her lyrical depictions of femininity and eroticism, many of which attracted critical acclaim in her native country. They are believed by several commentators to have been influenced by Surrealism and its Romanian successor, Onirism, and seen as examples of Postmodernism, while Cesereanu herself identified some of her writings with psychedelic experience and with the coined term delirionism. She is also noted for collaborating with Romanian-born American poet Andrei Codrescu on two poems, both of which were completed through e-mail exchanges.

Several of Cesereanu's studies deal with the impact of the communist regime on Romanian culture and society, and in particular with the history of repression and penal labor. She has also contributed essays and coordinated research on various aspects of Romania's post-communist history, as well as on the history of journalism in her country.

== Biography ==
Born in Cluj, Ruxandra Cesereanu is the daughter of writer Domețian Teodoziu Cesereanu and his wife Aurora, a teacher. She graduated from the Natural Sciences High School (now the Onisifor Ghibu High School), and studied Philology at the UBB's Romanian-Spanish Department, graduating in 1985. She received her graduation diploma with a thesis on the work of poet Mihai Eminescu (Moartea, visual și somnul în opera lui Eminescu, or "Death, Dreaming and Sleep in the Work of Mihai Eminescu").

After being assigned a teaching position in 1988, she taught Romanian language and literature at educational institutions in Năsăud, Bistrița, and Avrig. In 1989, the year when the communist regime was toppled by the Romanian Revolution, Cesereanu was working in Cluj-Napoca, where she was an editor for the Film Distribution Section of Transylvania. In 1990, she became an editor for the film and movie magazine Ecran, before joining Steaua's staff the following year. She also worked as a journalist for Ziarul de Cluj in 1998.

In 1994, Cesereanu began teaching at the UBB's Faculty of Letters, and moved on to the Faculty of Political Sciences' Journalism Department in 2000. She was the recipient of several scholarships: in 1992, the Central European University granted her a one-year study course in Prague, and in 1995 she received a similar grant from the Soros Foundation.

After receiving a PhD in 1997, with a thesis on the impact of communist persecution on Romanian culture (Infernul concentraționar reflectat în conștiinţa românească, "The Inferno of the Prison System as Reflected in the Romanian Consciousness"), Cesereanu was the recipient of a Fulbright Grant to the United States, affiliating with Columbia University's Harriman Institute in New York City (1999–2000). She then received a four-month research grant in France, followed by two creativity grants in, respectively, Rhodes and Arles. She became a Lecturer (2002) and then a Prelector (2003) for the UBB's Journalism Department.

Cesereanu is a member of the Writers' Union of Romania since 1994, and of the Romanian PEN Club since 2001. She is also a member of the UBB's Center for Imagination Studies and of the Echinox Cultural Foundation. In addition to her work as a writer and commentator, Cesereanu has also produced a short documentary film for the Cluj-Napoca branch of the national television channel (Treisprezece biserici, "Thirteen Churches", 1998), and a four-episode talk show series on cultural issues, aired by the same station during 2000. Cesereanu also organized two cultural events in her native city: a poetry symposium in 1998 and an art exhibit in 1999. The Cluj-Napoca Writers' Association granted her its Poetry Award on two separate occasions (1994, 2005), and its Essay Award in 1998 and 2001. She is a recipient of Apostrof magazine's Ion Negoițescu Award in the Essay category (1998), and received the Lions Club Prose Prize in 2005.

In addition to her contributions to Steaua, Apostrof, and Ziarul de Cluj, Cesereanu had her articles hosted by publications such as Cuvântul, Tribuna, Familia, Revista 22, Vatra, România Literară, Observator Cultural, Convorbiri Literare, Romanian Review, Orizont, Memoria and Echinox, as well as in Columbia University's Intermarium and the Moldovan literary magazine Contrafort.

Ruxandra Cesereanu is married to Corin Braga, the dean of UBB's Faculty of Letters since 2008. She signs her works with her maiden name.

== Literary contributions ==
=== Poetry and prose of fiction ===
Cesereanu has a large number of contributions to literature, which, according to literary critic Paul Cernat, makes her "one of the most creative literary women in post-revolutionary Romania". Much of her early work, Cernat argues, is characterized by "mannerism", related to Onirism and using psychoanalytic techniques. The links with Onirism and Surrealism have also been noted by critic Matei Călinescu, who also noted that Cesereanu took inspiration from the tradition of fairy tales and legends, in particular in pieces where she reinterprets Arthurian legends and retells the mythical search for the Holy Grail. Cesereanu's collaborator and literary historian Doina Jela describes her prose as "postmodern", while historian and civil society activist Adrian Marino calls her "the most original, but also the most paradoxical writer from Cluj-Napoca".

Cesereanu's early poems, grouped in the volumes Grădina deliciilor ("Garden of Delights") and Oceanul Schizoidian ("The Schizoid Ocean"), both noted for their interrogative and occasionally violent stances, have been defined by the author herself as "extremely attached to a culture of corporality", depicting "battles with myself, with Death, with love, with God." The poetry volume Femeia-cruciat ("The Woman-Crusader") was imagined by the author as a dialog between the several aspects of femininity and four men, each standing for one of the main images of the male: "Magister (her master), the Brother, the Lover and Christ." The book also depicts women through "a series of portraits", comprising "the neurotic little girl, the femme fatale, the crusader, the schizophreniac woman, the mystic, the profligate woman etc." This focus on female passion, which she noted was akin to an act of "exorcism", is also present in the "letters of a courtesan" series of poems she published under the title Veneția cu vene violete ("Venice with Violet Veins").

In 2002, Cesereanu published the novel Tricephalos (or "Trikephalos"). She speaks of it as: "A book of initiation into an eroticism that is at once spectacular and abysmal, but also into the emptiness of this world. A book that has fulfilled me as both a writer and a woman." Cernat defines the volume as "the inkhorn myth-making of the eros and of traveling [which] relishes into an extravagant spectacle of female stances". Literary critic Dan C. Mihăilescu describes it as "imbued in sexuality", and notes that some have even compared it to Emmanuelle, a French softcore film.

Three years after Tricephalos, Cesereanu published Nebulon, a collection of short stories. The eponymous micro-novel Nebulon, based on the Arthurian legend, is one of many cultural references in the book: the other stories reference a wide range of cultural symbols, featuring, among other things, the imaginary symposium of Balkan and Mediterranean nations, an account involving the metamorphosis of a virgin fisherman in Tunisia, a memoir of the author's own love for the British rock band Pink Floyd, and recollections from her childhood. Cesereanu's other Partly expanding on her earlier themes, the pieces were defined by Cernat as "exercises in virtuosity", and noted for their "imaginative exuberance". However, the critic objected to their "inkhorn" and "didactic" aspects, raising concern that the author's tendency to "reveal the conventions of her own narratives" echoed "pedantry".

Early in the 2000s, Ruxandra Cesereanu took a more experimental approach to poetry, theorizing a style for which she coined the term delirionism (from "delirium"). According to her own definition, it implies "the transposition of a semi-psychedelic trance into poetry". She then publicized a Delirionist Manifesto, which was notably read by Romanian American writer Andrei Codrescu. According to Cesereanu, Codrescu welcomed the new trend, and identified himself as a delirionist.

In June 2007, Cesereanu and Codrescu published a lengthy experimental poem they authored together, which was completed through the means of e-mail exchanges. Titled Submarinul iertat ("The Forgiven Submarine"), it is structured as a set of poetry lessons, handed down by a beatnik poet and woman pianist to a submarine. Codrescu, who noted that he and his collaborator on the poem only met once in person by the time they started work, described the piece as "the complete story of a difficult love", commented on the writing process: "I was a sleepwalker and an obsessive person. I wrote like a madman and expected immediate replies from Ruxandra, and if the answer did not come on time, I went into hysteric fits like a girl would."

Cesereanu noted that, although begun as a game, the writing drew praise from the influential Romanian writer Mircea Cărtărescu, who recommended it for publishing. It was issued in a luxury edition of 150 copies, bound in velvet and illustrated with works by the Cluj-Napoca-based artist Radu Chio. The two authors wrote a second collaborative poem, Ospățul alchimic ("The Alchemic Feast"), originally published on Cesereanu's blog and later printed by the magazine România Literară.

=== Literary and historical essays ===
Cesereanu dedicated part of her work to researching the impact of communist-organized state persecution, and to the historical investigation of political imprisonments during the 1950s and 60s, as set in place by the communist secret police, the Securitate. Dan C. Mihăilescu, who referred to Cesereanu as one in a "Cluj-Napocan, Transylvanian 'trident' " of essayists, alongside Marta Petreu and Ștefan Borbély, indicated she was "one of the most industrious literary historians, analysts of mentalities, of the ethno-psychologies etc." Speaking in 2004, she noted that her contributions in the study of what she calls "the Romanian Gulag" aimed to provide material for a "trial of communism" in Romania. Paul Cernat argues that there may be a subtle connection between Cesereanu's fiction and her historical studies, indicating that the "archeology of nocturnal phantasms", a common theme in Cesereanu's poetry, may share focus with her interest in " 'domesticating' a savage imagination" Romanians have developed around the issue of communist terror.

Cesereanu notes that, although not a trained historian, she sought to contribute material that would bridge a gap in traditional historiography. At the time, speaking of the prison system set in place in the Soviet Union and throughout the Eastern Bloc, Cesereanu stated: "I do not think that the Holocaust and the Gulag should be judged in competition to one another, as I do not believe in a hierarchy of horror. Horror is horror, there is no room set for a first prize with a wreath and then a second place, a third etc. Between the regimes that have produced the Holocaust and those that have produced the Gulag there were differences in the practice of terror, but the goal was one and the same." She also indicated that her investigations also dealt with politically motivated "fratricide" in general, including the Mineriads of the early 1990s, during which miners from the Jiu Valley assailed the "Golani" crowds protesting in Bucharest.

In particular, Cesereanu focused on preserving the memory of the Romanian penitentiary system, objecting to a tendency toward "passivity and indifference", which, she argues, is present among those who have "collaborated with the communist regime" or are among "the more or less symbolic executioners". She also noted that, in addition to this category and the smaller one, comprising people who assume "a collective memory", there are those who assume a "neither pro- nor against position, because they have done nothing against the communist regime, but where obedient." She added: "I place my confidence in the youngsters and their appetite for the truth."

Cesereanu's research into violence also extended to investigating the tradition of abusive and demeaning language in Romanian journalistic prose, from the 19th century onwards. She subsequently published the 2003 study Imaginarul violent al românilor ("The Violent Imaginary of the Romanians"), which analyzes the references to violence in articles authored by the celebrated writers Mihai Eminescu, Ion Luca Caragiale, and Tudor Arghezi, provides an overview of the violent fascist discourse of the interwar period and World War II (in particular that used by the Iron Guard), and looks into the radicalism of the communist newspapers which monopolized information after 1947. The main focus, Cesereanu writes in the book, was on the "spectacular-inventive" use of "the law breaking register, the bestial, the putrid-excremental and the lecherous ones." According to Adrian Marino, this signified that the material dealt with was of a "maximal triviality, vulgarity and violence."

In its final part, the volume investigates the proliferation of abusive language and threats in the Romanian press of the early 1990s, focusing on papers who supported the ruling National Salvation Front, in particular Adevărul, Dimineața, Azi, and the ultra-nationalist România Mare. Notably, this chapter of the book focuses on hate mail received by poet Ana Blandiana, who had become one of the Salvation Front's most prominent critics, and who, Doina Jela argues, was thus being subjected to intimidation from the part of former Securitate operatives who supported the new authorities. Also according to Jela, Cesereanu read the letters in their entirety (something which their addressee had always refused to do) and used their many claims and calumnies as evidence of a distorted and violent image Romanians in general had of the world at large. Of the book's perspective on the Mineriads, Marino wrote: "Written in sobre, calm manner, with outstanding clarity, well-informed, this 'bitter story' (which we have all lived through) [is] at the level of the best Romanian contributions in this field. And more than once above these." Noting the impact of "the author's literary talent" on her scientific work, he praised the work for its "fluent style, without any aridity."

Although critically acclaimed, the book raised some concerns that, in particular through its choice of title, it was over-generalizing mentalities not necessarily shared by the entire Romanian society. While himself objecting to this possibility of misinterpretation, Mihăilescu notes that Imaginarul violent al românilor documents a number of unusual connections between violent images in the Romanian press. He thus comments that the "imprecations" found in the far right Sfarmă-Piatră resemble the "appeals to assassination" authored by the Romanian Communist Party's Silviu Brucan, and that some of the more scornful pamphlets published by the left-wing Arghezi served as an inspiration to the ultra-nationalists Eugen Barbu and Corneliu Vadim Tudor. Adrian Marino commented that, although the book could not provide an exact portrayal of Romanian references to violence, it could serve as a study in "ethno-ontology", a concept first used by Romanian historian Sorin Antohi. Cesereanu herself commented on her choice of title, indicating that she had aimed for "corporalization and personalization", and rejecting speculation that she was unfavorably comparing Romanians to other peoples.

Cesereanu also coordinated two volumes documenting the livelihood of marginalized categories in the post-revolutionary period. According to Cernat, they are both written as "experimental reportages". She has also contributed a book on the 1989 Romanian Revolution (Decembrie '89. Deconstrucția unei revoluții, "December 1989. The Deconstruction of a Revolution").

== Political advocacy ==
In early 2007, Cesereanu became involved in supporting President Traian Băsescu, who was facing impeachment referendum as a result of Parliament decision. Together with 49 other intellectuals (among them Adriana Babeți, Hannelore Baier, Mircea Cărtărescu, Magda Cârneci, Livius Ciocârlie, Andrei Cornea, Sabina Fati, Florin Gabrea, Sorin Ilieșiu, Gabriel Liiceanu, Mircea Mihăieș, Dan C. Mihăilescu, Virgil Nemoianu, Andrei Oișteanu, Horia-Roman Patapievici, Dan Perjovschi, Andrei Pippidi, Șerban Rădulescu-Zoner, Victor Rebengiuc, Dan Tapalagă, Vladimir Tismăneanu, Florin Țurcanu, Traian Ungureanu, Sever Voinescu, and Alexandru Zub), she signed an open letter accusing parliamentary parties of benefiting from the crisis.

The signers accused the most radical anti-Băsescu parties, a core group including the Social Democrats, the Conservative Party, and the Greater Romania Party, of representing the legacy of communism and political corruption. The letter noted that this group had objected to both the findings of the Presidential Commission for the Study of the Communist Dictatorship in Romania, which offered the basis for the regime's retrospective condemnation, and to the judicial reform measures advanced by Băsescu.

== Works ==
=== Originally published in Romanian ===
- Călătorie prin oglinzi ("Voyage Through Looking Glasses"), micro-novel, Editura Dacia, Cluj-Napoca, 1989
- Grădina deliciilor ("Garden of Delights"), poems, Echinox, Cluj-Napoca, 1993
- Zona vie ("Live Zone"), poems, Editura Dacia, Cluj-Napoca, 1993
- Cădere deasupra orașului ("Fall Over the City"), poems, Transpres, Sibiu, 1994
- Purgatoriile ("The Purgatories"), short prose, Editura Albatros, Bucharest, 1997
- Oceanul schizoidian ("Schizoid Ocean"), poems, Editura Marineasa, Timișoara, 1998; second edition Editura Vinea, Bucharest, 2006
- Călătorie spre centrul infernului. Gulagul în conștiinţa românească ("Journey to the Center of Hell. The Gulag in the Romanian Modern Conscience"), essay, Editura Fundaţiei Culturale Române, Bucharest, 1998
- Trupul-Sufletul ("The Body-The Soul"), poems, Călin Stegerean, 1998
- Femeia-cruciat ("The Crusader-Woman"), anthology, poems, Editura Paralela 45, Cluj-Napoca & Bucharest, 1999
- Panopticum. Tortura politică în secolul XX ("Panopticon. Political Torture in 20th Century"), essay, Institutul European, Iaşi, 2001
- Veneția cu vene violete. Scrisorile unei curtezane ("Venice with Violet Veins. Letters of a Courtesan"), poems, Editura Dacia, Cluj-Napoca, 2002
- Tricephalos ("Trikephalos"), novel, Editura Dacia, Cluj-Napoca, 2002
- Imaginarul violent al românilor ("The Violent Imaginary of the Romanians"), essay, Humanitas, Bucharest, 2003
- Fărâme, cioburi, așchii dintr-o Curte a Miracolelor ("Bits, Shards, Splinters from a Cour des Miracles"), reportages (as editor), Editura Limes, Cluj-Napoca, 2003
- Decembrie '89. Deconstrucția unei revoluții ("December 1989. Deconstruction of a Revolution"), essay, Polirom, Iaşi, 2004
- Kore-Persephona, poems, Editura Vinea, Bucharest, 2004
- A doua Curte a Miracolelor ("The Second Cour des Miracles"), reportages (as editor), Editura Tritonic, Cluj-Napoca, 2004
- Nebulon, prose, Polirom, Iaşi, 2005
- Gulagul în conștiinţa românească. Memorialistica și literatura închisorilor și lagărelor comuniste ("The Gulag Reflected in the Romanian Consciousness. The Memories and Literature of Communist Prisons and Camps"), essay, Polirom, Iaşi, 2005
- Made in Romania. Subculturi urbane la sfârșit de secol XX și început de secol XXI ("Made in Romania. Urban Subcultures upon the Close of the 20th Century and the Start of the 21st Century"), essay, Editura Limes, Cluj-Napoca, 2005
- Nașterea dorințelor lichide ("The Birth of Liquid Desires"), prose, Cartea Românească, Bucharest, 2007
- Submarinul iertat ("The Forgiven Submarine"), with Andrei Codrescu, Editura Brumar, Timișoara, 2007
- coma, Editura Vinea, București, 2008
- Angelus, Editura Humanitas, București, 2010
- Ținutul Celălalt, poem-roman scris în colaborare cu Marius Conkan, Cartea Românească, 2011
- Un singur cer deasupra lor, roman, Polirom, 2013
- California (Pe Someș), Editura Charmides, 2014
- Veneţia cu vene violete. Scrisorile unei curtezane ("Venice with Violet Veins. Letters of a Courtesan"), poems, Second Edition, Introduction by Giovanni Magliocco, Afterword by Ilona-Manuela Duță, Editura Fractalia, București, 2016
- California (pe Someș), Editura Charmides, 2014.
- Scrisoare către un prieten și înapoi către țară , Pitești, Paralela 45, 2018.
- SOPHIA ROMÂNIA, Casa de Editură Max Blecher, 2021.

=== Translated works ===
==== in English ====
- Ruxandra Cesereanu, Schizoid Ocean, poems, translated by Claudia Litvinchievici, Binghamton, esf publishers, 1997
- Ruxandra Cesereanu, Lunacies, poems, translated by Adam J. Sorkin, Claudia Litvinchievici and the poet, NYC, Meeting Eyes Bindery, 2004
- Ruxandra Cesereanu, Crusader-Woman, poems, translated by Adam J. Sorkin, Claudia Litvinchievici, Madalina Mudure and the poet, 2008, Black Widow Press
- Ruxandra Cesereanu & Andrei Codrescu, Forgiven Submarine, poetry, translated by Andrei Codrescu, 2009, Black Widow Press
- Ruxandra Cesereanu, Angelus, novel, translated by Alistair Ian Blyth, 2015, Lavender Ink, New Orleans
- Ruxandra Cesereanu, Panopticon. Political Torture in the 20th Century, essay, translated by Carmen Borbely, Mimesis Edizioni, Milan, 2021
- Ruxandra Cesereanu, Romania - From Communism to Post-Communism. Studies and Essays. Roumanie - du Communisme au Post-Communisme. Etudes et essais, Milan, AlboVersorio, 2022
- Ruxandra Cesereanu, California (on the Somes), poetry, translated by Adam J. Sorkin with the poet, Black Widow Press, 2023
- Ruxandra Cesereanu, Noah's Literary Ark for Gourmets. Studies and Essays in Comparative Literature, Milan, AlboVersorio, 2023

==== in Italian ====
- Ruxandra Cesereanu, Coma, poetry, translated by Giovanni Magliocco, Rome, Aracne, 2012
- Ruxandra Cesereanu, Venezia dalla vene viola. Lettere di una cortigiana, poetry, translated by Giovanni Magliocco, Rome, Aracne, 2015
- Ruxandra Cesereanu, Femeia-cruciat / La donna-crociato, poetry, bilingual edition, translated by Giovanni Magliocco, Foreword by Giovanni Magliocco, Afterword by Ilona Duță, Illustrations by Rada Niță Josan, Bucharest, Vinea Publishing House, 2023

==== in Hungarian ====
- Ruxandra Cesereanu, Keresztesasszony, poetry, translated by Visky Zsolt, Koinonia, 2007
- Ruxandra Cesereanu, Utoferfiak, fiction, translated by Selyem Zsuzsa, Pecs, Jelenkor Kiado, 2009
- Ruxandra Cesereanu, Angelus, novel, translated by Noemi Karascony, Napkut Kiado, 2021

==== in Bulgarian ====
- Ruxandra Cesereanu, Anghelus, novel, translated by Hristo Boev, Perseus, 2016

==== in French ====
- Ruxandra Cesereanu, Demences, online edition, poetry, translated by Aurora Ceserean and Francois Breda, Amazon, 2020
- Ruxandra Cesereanu, Le toucher et autres contes, online edition, short stories, translated by Dragos Ioan, Amazon, 2020

==== in Spanish ====
- Ruxandra Cesereanu, Tres cuentos fantasmales, online edition, Amazon, 2021
