= Sever Voinescu =

Romanian journalist, political analyst, diplomat and politician

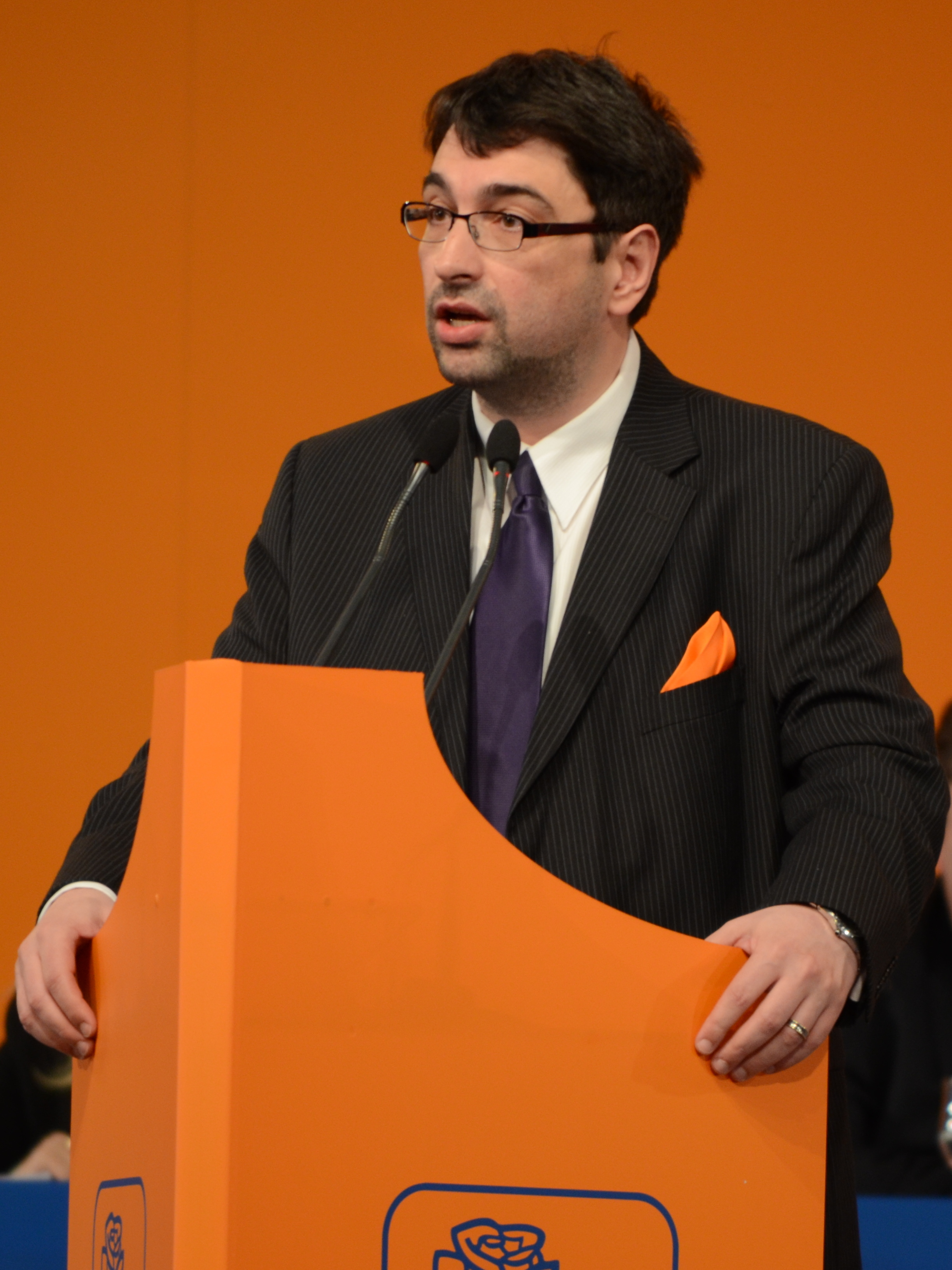
Sever Voinescu (March 2013)

Sever Voinescu (Romanian pronunciation: [ˈsever vojˈnesku], full last name Voinescu-Cotoi; born June 19, 1969) is a Romanian journalist, political analyst, diplomat and right-wing politician. A Foreign Affairs Ministry figure during the mid-1990s, he was later a Consul General of Romania in Chicago, United States. Voinescu became known as a columnist for Dilema Veche weekly and Cotidianul daily, and worked for the Institute for Public Policies, a political think tank. As pundit, Voinescu supports conservative ideas, and criticizes left-wing and welfare state solutions as applied to his country.

Often described as a member of the intellectual faction close to President Traian Băsescu, Voinescu was characterized by political opponents as a person lacking in independence, a verdict which, in 2007, cost him advancement in the diplomatic service. He subsequently joined the Democratic Liberal Party (PDL), running in the 2008 legislative election and earning a deputy seat for Ploieşti. From April 2009 to February 2011, he was Secretary of the Deputies' Chamber.

During his time in office, Sever Voinescu became known as a supporter of inner-party reform and pressed for the PDL's transformation into a conservative group, although he is still noted for taking sides against stronger critics of the party line. He also regularly spoke out against media opponents of Băsescu and the PDL, accusing part of the press of being politically controlled by the opposition parties. Voinescu was subsequently involved in several political controversies, including claims that he has used his Chamber position to push for electoral fraud.

== Biography ==
=== Early life and career ===
Born in Ploieşti, Sever Voinescu stated having grown up in a public housing area, and being a "child of the tower block". Baptized Romanian Orthodox, and identifying himself with liberal Orthodoxy, he grew up into a supporter of the social and political involvement of religious individuals, and recommends tolerance between believers and non-believers. Voinescu graduated from the Pedagogic High School's primary school, the Alexandru Ioan Cuza High School's gymnasium, and the Mihai Viteazul National College, while training in parallel with an amateur basketball team.

A graduate of the University of Bucharest Faculty of Law in 1992, he was a practicing lawyer until 1996. Initially, Voinescu was a trainee lawyer in his native city, but later joined a female colleague in opening a law firm, based in Bucharest. In parallel, he became noted for his cultural and political column in Dilema Veche (known then as just Dilema). His debut, Voinescu recalls, occurred in 1994, and resulted in his "addiction" to writing. According to a presentation for Înapoi la argument, the Romanian Television talk show of philosopher Horia-Roman Patapievici: "Sever Voinescu is one of the distinct voices in Romanian cultural journalism. His writing is in fact a moral attitude from a well-defined perspective, with no conjectural ambiguities." In the political climate following the 1989 Revolution, Voinescu also became active on the public scene, originally as a member of the civil society platform known as Group for Social Dialogue (a membership which, in 2008, he listed as one of the "tidbits in my biography that I take pride in").

Voinescu joined the Bucharest bar association in 1994. In 1995-1997, he was Assistant Professor for the Academy of Economic Studies (ASE) Law Faculty. He had previously given seminar-level classes at the ASE and several private universities. For a while in 1997, some months after the 1996 legislative election, which were won by the right-wing Romanian Democratic Convention (CDR), he was Counselor to the General Secretariat of the Victor Ciorbea government, answering to Remus Opriş. He referred to this point in his career as "an interesting turn", and recounts that the CDR victory had made him "enthusiastic". From 1998 to 2000, during the CDR premierships of Radu Vasile and Mugur Isărescu, Voinescu served as General Secretary in the Ministry of Foreign Affairs, under Ministers Andrei Pleşu and Petre Roman. Voinescu recounts that he accepted the request because it had been voiced by Dilema Veche editor Pleşu, a man whom he calls his "mentor".

Between 2000 and 2003, he was assigned the diplomatic office in Chicago, returning to lead the Institute for Public Policies' Foreign Policies and International Relations Program. He had been relieved from diplomatic office by the new Social Democratic executive of Adrian Năstase, and reflects back on the period: "I left the diplomatic career without a scandal and without regrets." During the following period, Sever Voinescu began contributing a political column to Cotidianul. He also became noted a supporter of America's war on terror, including the Second Iraq War. These sentiments were echoed in his columns for Dilema, and criticized from a Francophile position by academic Roxana Ologeanu. Voinescu's articles covered a wide range of subjects, among which reviewers highlight his interventions on the topic of Romanian economy, his posthumous homage to American literary theorist Susan Sontag, and his defense of Chalcedonian Christianity against neo-Gnosticism.

=== Support for President Băsescu and related controversy ===
Voinescu established himself on the political scene after the 2004 legislative and presidential elections, when the Social Democrats were defeated by the Justice and Truth coalition (DA), which also successfully endorsed Băsescu as President. As DA split into the Democratic Party (later PDL) and the National Liberals, the latter of which unsuccessfully endorsed the anti-Băsescu impeachment referendum of 2007, Voinescu expressed his support for the president. At that time, he joined 49 other intellectuals in signing an open letter addressed to the National Liberal Călin Popescu-Tăriceanu government, questioning its policies and supporting those of the president. Among the other signatories were Patapievici, Adriana Babeţi, Hannelore Baier, Mircea Cărtărescu, Magda Cârneci, Ruxandra Cesereanu, Livius Ciocârlie, Andrei Cornea, Sabina Fati, Florin Gabrea, Sorin Ilieşiu, Gabriel Liiceanu, Mircea Mihăieş, Dan C. Mihăilescu, Virgil Nemoianu, Andrei Oişteanu, Dan Perjovschi, Andrei Pippidi, Şerban Rădulescu-Zoner, Victor Rebengiuc, Dan Tapalagă, Vladimir Tismăneanu, Florin Ţurcanu, Traian Ungureanu and Alexandru Zub.

Just days before the referendum was carried by the pro-Băsescu option, the president endorsed Sever Voinescu for the office of Romanian Ambassador to the United States. This was coupled with his proposal to have journalist Traian Ungureanu appointed for the similar office in the United Kingdom. The proposals were presented to the Senate's Foreign Policy Committee, where Voinescu was rejected with 16 votes to 7. On the occasion, Social Democratic senator and Committee President Mircea Geoană, himself a former Ambassador to Washington, claimed that Voinescu's support for Băsescu made him a partisan option, and therefore unsuited for the office. In a November 2008 interview with Evenimentul Zilei, Voinescu provided his own take on the event, commenting that the reason presented by the Committee was "purely political", and arguing that: "In that [pre-referendum] context they would have outvoted God himself, had he been supported by Băsescu. I had come forth with a serious program, one I intended to discuss over with the Committee. I was suggesting a number of alternatives as a framework for our future relationship with the USA, but the Committee members were rather more interested in evaluating my activities as a journalist. They couldn't care less about my diplomatic program, but they were heartbroken over what I had published as a political commentator." According to România Liberă newspaper, Voinescu was specifically rejected for the "colums favorable to President Băsescu that he had published in the press."

While the Constitution gave Băsescu the power of decision in the matter, his temporary loss of office and replacement with Nicolae Văcăroiu meant that Voinescu's name was no longer an option. In summer 2007, the new Minister, Adrian Cioroianu, was engaged in a lengthy debate with reconfirmed President Băsescu, during which time no new ambassadors were appointed in several world capitals.

=== Political candidature ===
On July 23, 2008, Voinescu published his final Cotidianul column, announcing that he had agreed to run as a PDL candidate for the Chamber of Deputies in his native Prahova County. This was in view of the 2008 legislative election, the first such suffrage in Romania to be based on mixed member proportional representation and electoral colleges. In that article, Voinescu stated: "I have decided to run [...] in my native city of Ploieşti. The college comprises the neighborhood where I was born, grew up, lived through the first ages of youth and here my parents still live." Commenting on his motivation, Voinescu also wrote: "our politicians are trapped in moral and intellectual darkness which reaches the level of national catastrophe. I enter the arena because I want to bring clarity within the nebula."

In a 2008 interview with Evenimentul Zilei, he elaborated: "There are moments in life when one wants to see if one is capable of doing what he requires others to do." At the same time, he clarified that his choice to rally with the PDL was motivated by the party representing "the authentic Right", and by the National Liberals experiencing "a temporary drift", arguing that he found a post-electoral alliance with the Social Democrats "impossible [and] stinking", whereas the National Liberal Party had the "moral obligation" of joining the PDL in a new coalition. He also pointed out that, although a member of a faction politically allied with Băsescu, he did not intend to placate the latter in his public statements, and criticized his party for resorting to "suspicious borrowings [and] bizarre additions" in order to meet the necessary number of candidates. Believed by Evenimentul Zilei to be the natural choice for a PDL Foreign Minister, he spoke in favor of continuing a close cooperation with the United States, and justified Romania's traditional qualms toward Russia. After joining the party, Voinescu became an Administrative Board member for its think tank, the Institute for People Studies.

The candidature sparked negative comments from Jurnalul Naţional columnist Victor Ciutacu, who paralleled it with news that journalists Ungureanu and Cătălin Avramescu were also planning to run in elections as PDL affiliates. Although describing Voinescu as "a coherent journalist", Ciutacu alleged that all three were basing their actions on their support for Băsescu, and that they were thus comparable to lăutari singers, "who, depending on how good their showmanship is, are rewarded by the man sitting at the head of the table." In contrast, journalists at Gândul concluded that both Voinescu and Avramescu were electoral assets coveted by PDL leader Emil Boc, who, like other public figures from non-politicized areas, could bring help the party earn extra votes in the post-party-list era.

Voinescu won the seat in the 10th Electoral College for Prahova County. România Liberă also noted that his constituency was already favorable to the PDL. All other seats in Ploieşti were claimed by PDL members—Andrei Sava and Roberta Alma Anastase as the other two deputies, Gabriel Sandu as senator. In a January 2009 interview with Academia Caţavencu's Eugen Istodor, Voinescu stated his dissatisfaction with the post-election Emil Boc cabinet, founded around a PDL-PSD alliance at the end of failed negotiations between the PDL and the National Liberals. He argued: "I am not part of any decision structure within the PDL, so there was no reason for me to be asked [what I though about the PSD alliance]. [...] Within the PDL, there is a majority sentiment that it was the best of rationally possible solutions. The party is now in a Panglossian moment. But there also exists a lucid minority which continues to believe that it was not at all the best best of rationally possible solutions." He added: "For my case, of what was said during the campaign, as well as from things before, nothing has changed. I have no reason to believe that the PSD is better now than when it was impeaching the president. [...] The new PSD elite is different from the old one only in the sense that it is more flexible, more versatile, more chameleonic."

=== Chamber Secretary and Băsescu's spokesman ===
Voinescu was confirmed Chamber Secretary in April 2009, after a prolonged dispute within the coalition: although his candidature had been approved on principle by both coalition partners, several PSD and PDL parliamentarians refused to vote in favor during consecutive sessions. The vote was ultimately carried by 154 to 106. In October of the same year, Voinescu also became spokesman for Traian Băsescu's second-term presidential campaign. He was cited in the press stating: "I accepted this position for at least two reasons, the first being that I am a supporter of Traian Băsescu as a political project and that as both a politician and a citizen I wish to apply all my forces so that Traian Băsescu will win in these elections". In late November, during the two rounds of voting, Voinescu presented the official PDL viewpoint on the publicized video sample which seemed to show Băsescu punching a child. Voinescu's suggested that the images had been faked by the PDL's political rivals and, in reference to the press' reaction, argued: "the electoral campaign has fully entered its most despicable stage. Instead of debates between the candidates and letting the citizens decide, in the absence of any other influences, who should be the one to lead the country for the next five years, we have come to discuss a dubious, murky film, promoted on the screens of [media] mogul television stations with an obvious electioneering purpose." Following Băsescu's eventual reelection, Voinescu also subjected to public ridicule the claims of various PSD members that their candidate, Mircea Geoană, had been a victim of negative parapsychological techniques, such as "energy attacks" and "violet flame" power.

In January, Voinescu had supported the initiative of fellow junior PDL-ists Cristian Preda and Monica Macovei to reform the PDL from within by imposing new recruitment and internal promotion policies, and also gave backing to Sorin Frunzăverde's suggestion of reconstituting the PDL into a "People's Party". Their collective criticism of the Boc leadership was responded to by the Premier, who stated that both Preda and Voinescu needed to attend more party conferences and, through "clarification", come to terms with the party line. The verdict was reviewed negatively by political scientist Aurelian Giugăl, a critic of the Boc cabinet, who contrasted Boc's statement with the PDL having just welcomed into its ranks the "pathetic" nonconformist Honorius Prigoană, and concluded that "the presidential party" was only mimicking institutional reform.

In early 2010, Voinescu was involved in a publicized polemic with his PDL colleague Cristian Preda, regarding the party's doctrines and the measure of involvement on the part of President Băsescu. The debate was sparked in February by Voinescu's own comments, according to which the PDL needed to emphasize its support for Băsescu's political agenda and, as a consequence, adopt "a larger measure of Băsescianism". Preda reacted against the statement on his blog, where the wording used by Voinescu was referred to as "an unfortunate choice". Preda noted that he partly shared Voinescu's apprehension of "some PDL practices". He argued instead that there existed an inner-party struggle between old and new PDL members, in which the former category, "claiming lineage precisely from Traian Băsescu", could block the newer members out of power. Voinescu, who stated his dissatisfaction at being attacked on Preda's blog, noted: "I don't know why Cristian Preda wishes at all costs for us to quarrel in public. I have been following his quest for media glory for a while now and I'm bemused. If he has something to tell me, he knows where to find me." Discussing the core of Preda's objection, he added: "I understand that he is annoyed by the political adjectivization of the president's name [as Băsescianism]. That's his business. From what I found out, he says that there's now a need for answers to social issues and not invented words. I cannot believe that a phrase this trite, a phrase so much like a putrid slogan, could have been written down by Cristian Preda."

In reply, Preda noted "regretting" that Voinescu "has joined the team [of PDL members] who are intimated by public dialogue within the new media" (a group he identified with PDL activist Ioan Oltean). However, in an October interview with Istodor, Preda suggested that he still identified his own political partisanship with "the triad" of Voinescu, Macovei and Teodor Baconschi within a "collective identity" of PDL reformists, noting that he rejected the opposition parties as merely "preservers of the welfare state."

By then, Voinescu had also joined those PDL politicians who publicly asked for the new Boc executive (formed by the PDL and the Hungarian Democratic Union, with the PSD in opposition) to resign and be replaced with a "more flexible" variant, in line with the core electorate's wishes. During summer 2010, when Boc survived a motion of no confidence initiated by the PSD, Voinescu expressed a reserved position on the political consequences. Speaking at the time for B1 TV, he called the referred to the PSD's motion as "a poorly written lampoon", but warned that a cabinet reshuffle was in order. In September of that year, Voinescu and Elena Udrea were among those PDL parliamentarians who voted in favor of deposing the Boc cabinet, while others considered a reshuffling option. Voinescu's rationale was that the government policies had managed to erode grassroots support for the PDL, and the defeat of his option was reported by observers as a failure of the PDL's reform-minded wing.

=== Anastase scandal and conflict with Vântu ===
In September 2010, Sever Voinescu became involved in a political controversy, centered on Chamber President Roberta Alma Anastase. The scandal formed part of a national debate on the government-proposed measures to counter the effects of the Great Recession and public spending with right-wing policies, against the opposition-backed social security system. According to media and opposition reports, during the prolonged Chamber vote on the revised Law on Pensions, after opposition representatives had chosen to leave the hall in protest and the voting machine went out of order, Anastase over-counted the number of parliamentarians present in the hall, and PDL legislation was passed against consensus. As a result, the Social Democrats filed a legal complaint, citing malfeasance in office, electoral fraud and forgery.

Speaking for his party, PSD deputy Radu Moldovan alleged that the two Chamber leaders had implicitly "admitted" the deed they stood accused of, further accusing them of having displayed "illegal and criminal behavior against 6 million [old age pensioners]", and calling for the maximum sentence of 15 years in prison. In reply, PDL politicians expressed support for both figures, and argued that there was no proof of illegality in their actions. Early on, PDL Chamber group leader Mircea Toader stated that the chaotic procedures and the presence of unruly deputies around the rostrum meant that CCTV footage of the procedure was inconclusive. Cristian Preda spoke of the voting inaccuracies as "an error" on the part of Anastase and Voinescu, claiming that the illegal but allegedly commonplace absentee ballot had rendered unreliable all Chamber attendance reports. In a November interview with Radio France Internationale, Preda elaborated that the party as a whole needed to apologize for the "embarrassing" incident, and, while noting that Anastase's removal was not an option, asked Voinescu to present a formal explanation. The scandal reverberated at Dilema Veche, when poet Şerban Foarţă announced that he ceased contributing, not wishing for his name to feature alongside that of Voinescu, "an unfrequentable character".

During October 2010, Voinescu resumed his political conflict with the anti-Băsescu media outlets: Dan Voiculescu's Intact Media Group and Sorin Ovidiu Vântu's Realitatea-Caţavencu. In a public statement, the deputy accused both "moguls" of intending to "rob the public treasury" with backing from the PSD, and of staging an intense "defamation campaign" against President Băsescu, who would not assist them in deferring formal investigations into their businesses. As a result, Sorin Ovidiu Vântu announced that he was going to file a civil suit against Voinescu, Premier Boc and Elena Udrea, noting that he was not going to tolerate any further accusations that he himself was organizing a putsch (as once stated by Udrea). Vântu reportedly considered requesting 250,000 euro in damages from Voinescu, who had qualified Vântu's 1990s Gelsor-Fondul Naţional de Investiţii investment scheme as a "mega-confidence trick" and had alleged that Vântu made a profit withdrawing his assets before the scheme crashed.

At the time, Voinescu made controversial live appearances on another private network, Oglinda Television (OTV), which critics, including Voinescu himself, regard as a low-brow enterprise in the realm of tabloid media. In a Dilema Veche piece, Voinescu himself described the station as usually exploring "the shady and humid underground" of human expectations; he implied that everyone watches OTV, but that only some will admit it. Reacting to this characterization, Observator Cultural editor Carmen Muşat accused Voinescu of using a questionable media resource to increase Băsescu's exposure, against his own beliefs. TV critic and Dilema colleague Cezar Paul-Bădescu, who describes OTV as "a station specializing in cadavers and characters on the fringe of humanity", declared himself puzzled by Voinescu's rationale, but noted: "maybe [his reasons are] the same ones that prompted president Băsescu to conclude, back in the day, that said channel was frequentable". Other cultural magazines also reacted negatively to Voinescu's explanation of OTV's secret fan base: România Literară called his analysis "useless and dangerous", while Luceafărul took offense from the implication "that we are all headless beings with morbid inclinations".

In February 2011, Voinescu withdrew from the post of Chamber Secretary, as it was due to fall to a deputy of the Romanian ethnic minorities parties in the ensuing legislative session. In July, the High Court of Cassation and Justice ruled that prosecution in the Voinescu-Anastase case was unwarranted, since the contestants had not contested the vote through parliamentary procedure, as described by Chamber's internal regulations.

=== Conservative pundit ===
By 2008, Voinescu's Dilema Veche column was giving significant coverage to American politics, and were noted as a countercritique of Marxist takes on the world crisis, with suggestions that the memory of communism as a "criminal utopia" needed to be preserved in unadulterated fashion, for the benefit of future generations. In 2009, he contributed to a Humanitas homage volume for Andrei Pleşu, titled O filozofie a intervalului ("A Philosophy of the Interval"). Invited by Vladimir Tismăneanu, he was also a contributor to Verso review. His political essay was later included in the anthology Anatomia resentimentului ("The Anatomy of Resentment", Editura Curtea Veche, 2010).

The renewed contributions in these fields received criticism from various cultural and political reviewers. His severity in reacting to news that Barack Obama was considering a détente with the Taliban was covered, with irony, by Luceafărul magazine. It noted: "our specialists in the headbutting industry [...] have for a main mental preoccupation the handing of unneeded advice and moral slaps to the world's greatest leaders." In commentary he posted on the Voxpublica platform, Voinescu illustrated his defense of capitalism with suggestions that multinational corporations were still hiring, recommending Romanians to seek retraining; these views were criticized as specious and uncompassionate by essayist Liviu Ornea, who suggested that Voinescu's radicalism was even harming the PDL. Voinescu's activity as panelist was touched by another kind of controversy: in August 2010, Voinescu was described in the press as a "plagiarist", for a Dilema article on the Yemeni crackdown, which, it was argued, closely resembled a New York Times editorial; Voinescu defended his piece as a metanarrative. One of Voinescu's parables on the crisis issue was ridiculed by Luceafărul, who noted that it made the same point as an earlier contribution by Vintilă Mihăilescu, and concluded that Voinescu was no longer in the habit of actually reading Dilema Veche. Voinescu's other pursuits were in classical culture: an opera fan, he published a 2011 book of interviews with soprano Virginia Zeani, which received positive reviews from music critics.

In summer 2011, with fellow pundits Valeriu Stoica and Cătălin Avramescu, Sever Voinescu attended the conference tour on "Issues of the Romanian Right", jointly organized by the PDL's Institute for People's Studies and the Hanns Seidel Foundation. During one such event in Focşani, he and Stoica debated policy: Stoica expressed the belief that PDL, a "cocktail" of liberalism, conservatism and Christian democracy, needed to stand united behind Boc's economic measures; contrarily, Voinescu assessed that cabinet ministers less committed to laissez-faire needed to be discarded. Voinescu also had a debate with senator and senior PDL member Radu F. Alexandru. A critic of Băsescu's continued involvement with the PDL, Alexandru spoke out against the reformists' alleged practice of venting out complaints through mass media, but not at party conferences.

Shortly after, responding to criticism of Boc's governing practice, Băsescu publicized a reaction to inner PDL conflicts which nominated Voinescu and Preda as factors of disturbance: "Had I been the involved, the PDL would have been more adroit in its political action. There would have been no PDL politician not to follow the golden rule. We would be discussing these issues on the inside and, once something were set, we would all be abiding by it. No matter if they're named Preda, Sever Voinescu [or] Radu F. Alexandru, they would not be in the party had I been the one running it. Such things display the cowardice of these people. It's easy to issue a statement on TV and then grow in importance". Băsescu added that, instead of focusing on Boc, Voinescu should have spoken out against the "BVB triad" of PDL-ists who resist a change of platform: Radu Berceanu, Adriean Videanu and Vasile Blaga. In reply, Voinescu noted that the statement had troubled him, and that he even gave thought to resigning from the PDL.

Writing in a guest editorial for Revista 22 in September of that year, Voinescu referred to the need for a conservative pole to emerge in modern Romanian politics. His text argues: "In today's Romania, it is not at all hard to be a liberal or a socialist. What's hard is being a conservative. On another level, in today's Romania it is not at all hard to be an egotist, nor to cement yourself, forevermore, into the condition of a socially-assisted person. What's hard is to be a man of common sense, capable of balancing his own interest against that of others, after taking charge of his own destiny." According to Voinescu, there is an untapped electorate that consistently votes against left-wing policies, but is increasingly disenchanted with the effects of right-wing governance, and tacitly supporting any conservative, conviction politics, "Thatcherite" solution to Romania's woes. He suggested that its recovery by the PDL would be that party's "great chance". Voinescu also argued that old-school Romanian conservatism had been hijacked in the 1990s by Dan Voiculescu's eponymous party: "Can one imagine a more scandalous usurpation?"

=== 2011 vote on PDL ideology ===
Beginning in spring 2011, Voinescu was again involved with the PDL's inner reform project, alongside Macovei and Preda, supporting the motion presented to the PDL's May Congress with the aim of regaining electoral support and public trust before the 2012 election. He sketched out and advanced a proposal for a PDL Code of Conduct, which is supposed to regulate the party's response to criminal charges brought up against its politicians (past cases include Monica Iacob Ridzi or Dan Păsat), in what he described as an effort to increase transparency. On the occasion, Voinescu expressed discontent that the document, although nominally backed by Boc and by Macovei, had failed to gather majority support at earlier party reunions. He supported Băsescu's message to the PDL, which counseled the party to find itself a candidate (and successor to Băsescu) on par with Ronald Reagan or Margaret Thatcher, and reiterated the call for politicians "of conviction". The reformist group obtained the revision of charters which prevented junior members from running in party elections, but their main motion on party policies was defeated by the PDL's Berceanu-Blaga "old guard".

Additionally, Voinescu expressed disapproval for some Boc cabinet policies which he sees as deviating from the PDL's right-wing credentials, including the "pensioners' basket" welfare program, and publicly called for a radical change of the Romanian Constitution, deeming it "profoundly flawed" for what he interprets as a chronic failure to uphold the separation of powers. His endorsement of a project to award the Romanian Orthodox Church a say in the allocation of welfare programs generated criticism among secularist analysts, who commented that it bastardized the concept of social justice and effectively reduced the separation of church and state, or that it offered the Church an inflated role in politics and civil society.

A parallel dispute ensued, between Voinescu and Preda: Voinescu is a noted critic of party-list proportional representation and endorses first-past-the-post voting; in contrast, Preda dismisses his colleague's project as "populist mythology", arguing that further election reform would do little to address the realities of political corruption. The two figures were opposed by their attitudes on Boc, when Preda, unlike Macovei and Voinescu, chose not to endorse Boc's candidature for a new term as PDL leader. There was also a disagreement between Voinescu and President Băsescu in matters of world politics, after the latter went on record with a claim that Romania's future development depended on a hypothetical United States of Europe federation. Tracing the mixed results of Federal Europe concepts through history, Voinescu replied: "My personal opinion is that this goal is as beautiful as it is unreachable." Voinescu took a middle ground in the disputes between Băsescu and Dilema's Andrei Pleşu, arguing that the President's criticism of his mentor contained "uninspired metaphors"—in reaction, anti-Băsescu writer Bedros Horasangian asked: "How is it that Sever Voinescu [...] can still face up to Andrei Pleşu?"

=== People's Movement projects and 2012 riots ===
Speaking in September 2011, Voinescu dismissed criticism of the PDL coming from outgoing Labor Minister Sebastian Lăzăroiu, an independent politician. When asked to reply about Lăzăroiu's alternative proposals that the PDL transform itself into a "People's Movement" or perish, Voinescu stated his amusement, and noted: "I never did preoccupy myself with Mr. Lăzăroiu's prophecies." Confronted with speculation that the People's Movement project would attract into its ranks rogue members of the PNL who opposed the PSD alliance, Voinescu replied (in English): "Too soon to tell!"

Voinescu later returned with more explicit remarks, clarifying that the Movement was a sound project, which could help coagulate the Romanian right. He was also directing criticism toward the PDL's partner in government, the nominally left-wing National Union for the Progress of Romania, arguing that it could not expect to be included in the emerging party: "rest assured, nobody asked you in." In public statements, Voinescu ridiculed the political aspirations of OTV owner Dan Diaconescu and his own People's Party, viewing them as demagogic; he rejected suggestions of an alliance between Diaconescu and the PDL. When Lăzăroiu and Mihail Neamţu launched their own platform, Noua Republică, Voinescu admitted that it could win over a sizable portion of the PDL electorate.

In October 2011, Voinescu was head of the Romanian delegation at the NATO Parliamentary Assembly meeting, held in Bucharest. In this capacity, he signed the protocol which gave Romanian support for Georgia's Euro-Atlantic integration, and expressed the official viewpoint that Russia had no reason to fear the national missile defense developed in Eastern Europe.

As PDL spokesman, Voinescu tackled the spontaneous anti-government protests of January 2012. He suggested that there was "much to learn" for his party from the street reaction to the ongoing austerity measures, while also accusing the coalesced opposition, or Social Liberal Union (USL), of trying to capitalize on these events: "I'm not sure if those gathering in the square would want USL to win the elections." He and the party initially rallied behind Premier Boc: Voinescu expressed the viewpoint that popular indignation was not solely aimed at the PDL administration, but at the entire ruling class, and argued that the street demands for early elections were impractical. On February 6, however, he acknowledged Boc's resignation, calling it proof of political responsibility; he also favored continuity in matters of economic policy. During the demonstrations, anti-Voinescu slogans were specifically chanted by the 100 demonstrators gathering in his constituency of Ploieşti.
