= Civic Alliance Foundation =

Romanian non-governmental organization

The Civic Alliance Foundation (Romanian: Alianţa Civică, AC) was a Romanian non-governmental organization (NGO) during the 1990s. The AC had subsidiaries in 36 of the 41 counties, overseen by a 27-member National Council. Its motto was Nu putem reuşi decât împreună ("Only together can we succeed").

== History ==
Founded on 6 November 1990, when a group of 216 founding members (Romanian intellectuals from all fields of public life) signed a project-statement, it was officially registered on November 29 of the same year. During the early 1990s, the association was involved in protests against the ruling National Salvation Front (FSN), including the Golaniad public gathering that were ended by the June 1990 Mineriad. In July 1991, a sizeable portion of its members, led by Nicolae Manolescu, split with the AC over participation in national elections, and founded the Civic Alliance Party (PAC).

== Principles ==
According to its statute, the main goals of the Civic Alliance Foundation were as follows:

- Working for the establishment of a civil society and the rule of law in Romania;
- Defending human rights and fundamental freedoms;
- Defending individual rights and the creation of a climate of tolerance among citizens;
- Promoting democratic values and institutions, and consolidating real democracy in Romania;
- Defending civic and individual interests regardless of ethnic origin, language, religion, and so on;
- Organizing civic education programs;
- Regaining historical truth, moral values, and awareness that have been affected through imposing totalitarian communist rule;
- Promoting awareness, respect, and dissemination of truth in public life, through combating all forms of violence and deception, through promotion of tolerance and dialogue within the association as well as within the social and political life of the country at large;
- Promoting real values, eliminating corruption, and incompetence from economical, social, and political life;
- Supporting the continuation of economic, social, and administrative reforms;
- Involvement in the process of informing about Romania's Euro-Atlantic integration;
- Creating and maintaining natural links between the Romanian diaspora and country;
- Developing relations with Romanians outside Romania's borders, and with the Romanian diaspora, in supporting their actions to maintain their national identity;
- Offering support to underprivileged social categories.

== Members and former members ==
- Petre Mihai Băcanu
- Ana Blandiana
- Ion Caramitru
- Victor Ciorbea
- Emil Constantinescu
- Doina Cornea
- Lucia Hossu Longin
- Sorin Ilieşiu
- Adrian Marino
- Ioan T. Morar
- Dan Puric
- Şerban Rădulescu-Zoner
- Romulus Rusan
- Mihai Şora
- Stelian Tănase
- Vasile Baghiu
