= Doina Cornea =

Romanian academic and activist (1929–2018)

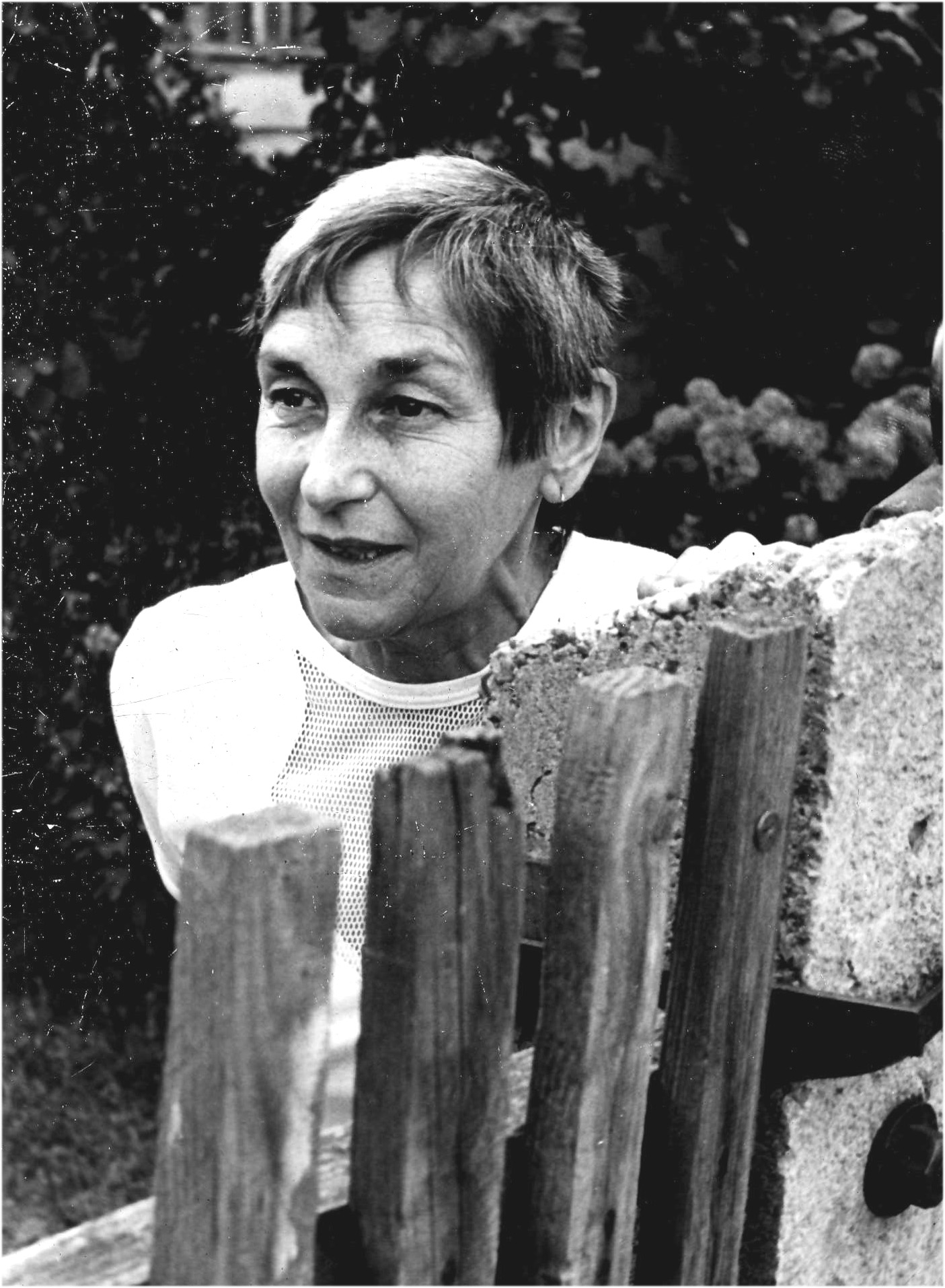
- Cornea in the 1980s
- Born: 30 May 1929; Brașov, Kingdom of Romania
- Died: 3 May 2018 (aged 88); Cluj-Napoca, Romania
- Resting place: Hajongard Cemetery, Cluj-Napoca
- Citizenship: Romanian
- Education: Babeș-Bolyai University
- Occupations: Human rights activist Language professor
- Years active: 1949–2018
- Known for: Dissident in Communist Romania led by Nicolae Ceaușescu
- Notable work: translation of Încercarea Labirintului by Mircea Eliade
- Political party: National Salvation Front (1989–1990); Romanian Democratic Convention (1990–2000)
- Board member of: Group for Social Dialogue
- Children: Ariadna Combes; Leontin Juhasz
- Awards: See Honours and awards

Doina Cornea (Romanian: [ˈdojna ˈkorne̯a]; 30 May 1929 – 3 May 2018) was a Romanian human rights activist and French language professor. She was a dissident during the communist rule of Nicolae Ceaușescu.

She was co-founder of the Democratic Anti-totalitarian Forum of Romania (Forumul Democrat Antitotalitar din România), as the first attempt to unify the democratic opposition to the post-communist government. This organization later transformed into the Romanian Democratic Convention (Convenția Democrată Română, CDR), which brought Emil Constantinescu to power.

== Early life ==
Born in Brașov, Romania, Cornea began studying French and Italian at the University of Cluj in 1948. After graduation, she taught French at a secondary school in Zalău, where she married a local lawyer. She returned to Cluj in 1958, where she worked as an assistant professor at the Babeș-Bolyai University.

Her first political engagements were made in 1965, when, she witnessed how a friend of hers was criticising Charles de Gaulle in Strasbourg, France. Whilst she was expecting the police to turn up and arrest the person, she was surprised when she saw that nobody came. Ashamed of the political constraints that were pressing against Romania at the time, she felt ashamed and this pushed her into starting political activism.

== Dissidence under communism ==
In 1980 she published her first samizdat book, Încercarea Labirintului ("The Test of the Labyrinth") by Mircea Eliade translated by her from French; then four other samizdat translations followed.

=== Protest letters ===
She illegally sent the first letter to Radio Free Europe in 1982, the first in a series of texts and protests against Ceaușescu. She saw the crisis not just a material/economic one, but also a spiritual crisis, the Romanian people "a people fed solely on slogans", who value more material values rather than spiritual values, which she defined as the ones which "generated intelligence, ethics, culture, liberty and responsibility".

At the end of her letter, she apologized for not revealing her name, but she signed the letter to show that it was authentic. Due to a misunderstanding, Radio Free Europe read the letter in full, including the name. On September 15, 1983, she was fired from the university because of her political activity, the official reason being that she gave her students to read the diary of Mircea Eliade.

In the second letter which was published by BBC and Radio Free Europe, she protested against the restrictions that were put forward to the academia and the fact that the university leadership didn't defend her and they even tried to find what ideals she was supporting. She continued to send a constant stream of texts and protests to Radio Free Europe. Her message was then repeated in the articles she wrote after the 1989 Revolution: even if the political and economic situation would change, this would not change the perversity of the morals of the individuals.

In August 1987, she addressed an open letter to Ceaușescu, in which she advocated reform in the higher education: greater academic freedom and university autonomy (to prevent them from being subservient to the interests of the Communist Party), more exchanges with foreign universities, exemption from the mandatory participation in harvesting and teaching students how to think instead of just facts.

During the Brașov rebellion, on 18 November 1987, together with her son, Leontin Iuhaș, she spread in Cluj-Napoca 160 manifestos of solidarity with the workers who rebelled against the communist government. The following day, they were arrested by the Securitate, which held them until December 1987, when they were released following an international outcry and a documentary about Romania under Ceaușescu broadcast on French television, which included an older interview with Cornea.

In the Summer of 1988, she heard on Radio Free Europe that she had been invited at a human rights conference in Cracow; she didn't receive the invitation. She requested a passport only to be refused, responding with a letter in which she argued that a successful totalitarian society can only be created by robbing people of intellectual fulfilment.

=== House arrest ===
She wrote a further letter, which was smuggled outside the country by Josy Dubié, broadcast by RFE on August 23, 1988 (Romania's national day). She found Ceaușescu personally responsible for the spiritual and economic disaster in Romania. She gave him two choices: he either gives up (together with the nomenklatura) running the country, or he introduces reforms to allow pluralism and separate the administration and judiciary from the Party.

She argued for freedom of expression, freedom of the press, freedom of assembly and freedom of travel; on the economic side, her letter (which may have been drafted by other collaborators) argued for closing down loss-making factories, re-tooling factories for being able to compete with foreign companies, hiring foreign managers and recreation of private land ownership, as well as the stopping of the Systematization programme.

Subsequently, she was put on house arrest by the Securitate. Following a documentary shown on Belgian television, an international campaign for her release began. Resolutions arguing for her release were passed by the European Parliament and the International Confederation of Free Trade Unions. Personal interventions by foreign politicians were made to the Romanian government, including the ones by Laurent Fabius, President of the French National Assembly, Valéry Giscard d'Estaing, former President of France, and Leo Tindemans, the Belgian Foreign Minister.

Nevertheless, she was able to send two more letters, including one in which she discussed the arbitrariness of the measures taken against her, which had no basis in Romanian law, noting the disregard of the rule of law and an arbitrary use of power.

In 1989, Cornea received an invitation from Danielle Mitterrand (wife of French President François Mitterrand) to attend the bicentennial celebration of the French Revolution, but again, she was denied the exit visa. Another invitation to the Council of Europe failed to reach her as it was handed to the Romanian ambassador in Paris.

=== Release ===
She was released 21 December 1989 during the Romanian Revolution, on the day before the government was ousted. Immediately after release, she began taking part in the street demonstrations in Cluj-Napoca.

== Activity after December 1989 ==
After 22 December 1989 Cornea was asked to become a member of the first post-communist government organization, the National Council of the National Salvation Front. She quit this body on 23 January 1990 after it decided to run as a party in the 1990 elections. She considered it to be dependent upon Soviet leader Mikhail Gorbachev and still dominated by people with communist pasts.

Together with intellectuals like Ana Blandiana, Mihai Șora and Mircea Dinescu, Cornea continued her outspokenness against the new administration of Ion Iliescu, president of Romania until his defeat by Emil Constantinescu in the 1996 election. She was co-founder of the Democratic Anti-totalitarian Forum of Romania (Forumul Democrat Antitotalitar din România), as the first attempt to unify the democratic opposition to the post-communist government. This organization later transformed into the Romanian Democratic Convention (Convenția Democrată Română, CDR), which brought Emil Constantinescu to power.

Cornea was co-founder of The Group for Social Dialogue (Grupul pentru Dialog Social) in Romania, of the Civic Alliance Foundation and of the Cultural Memory Foundation (Fundația Culturală Memoria).

== Death ==
Doina Cornea died on 4 May 2018 at her home in Cluj, with her son by her side, at the age of 88. She was buried with military honors at the city's Hajongard Cemetery. She had two children, Ariadna Combes and Leontin Iuhas.

== Honours and awards ==
=== Honours ===
==== National honours ====
- (Romania) Romanian Royal Family: 40th Knight of the Royal Decoration of the Cross of the Romanian Royal House
- Romanian Republic: Former Chancellor Grand Cross of the Order of the Star of Romania

==== Foreign honours ====
- France: Commander of the Legion of Honour

=== Awards ===
- Belgium
  - Brussels: Honorary Degree of the Free University of Brussels
- Norway: The Professor Thorolf Rafto Memorial Prize
