= Bucovăț, Timiș =

Bucovăț
- Commune
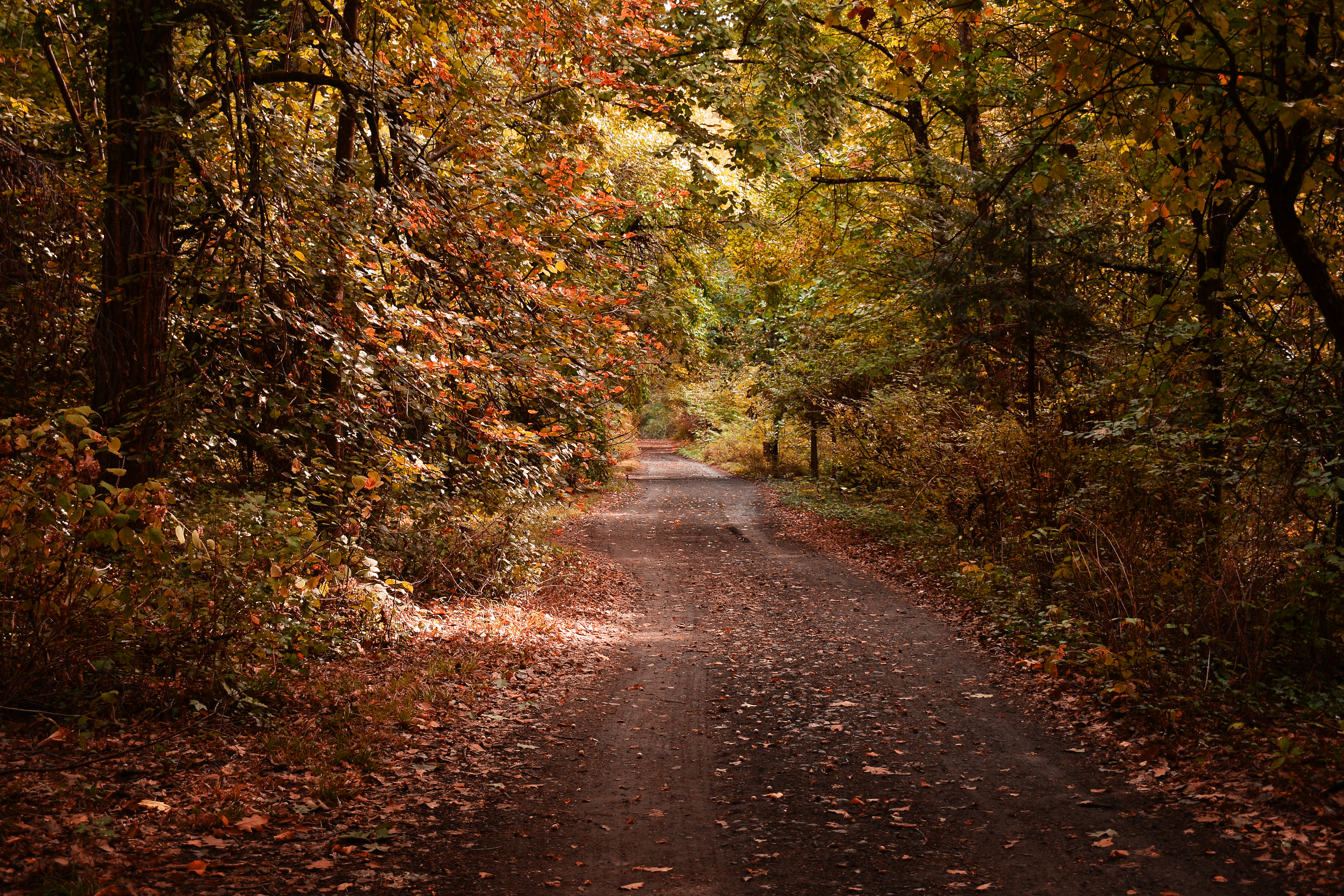
- The arboretum in Bazoșu Nou

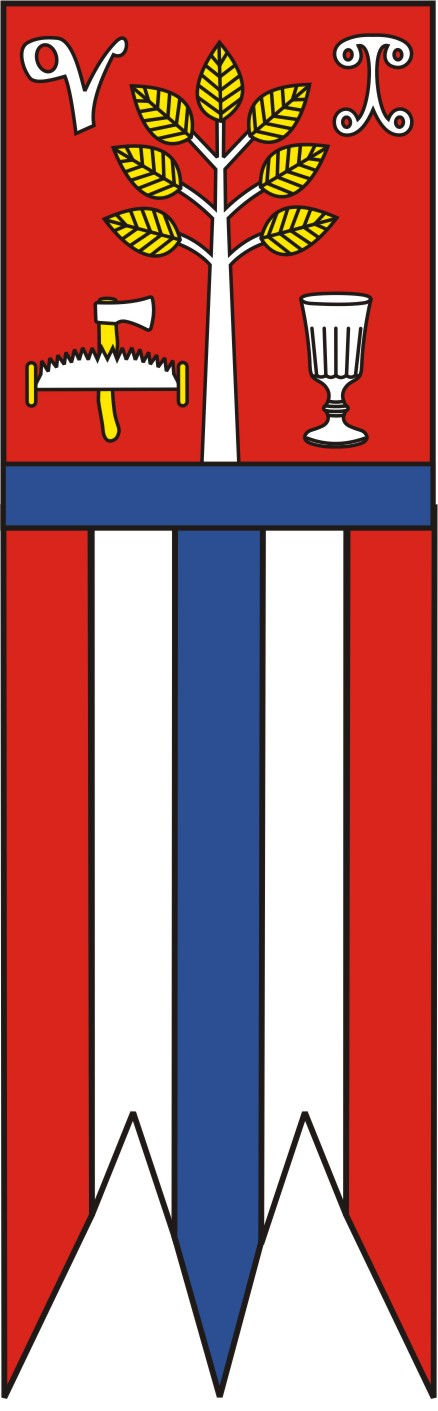
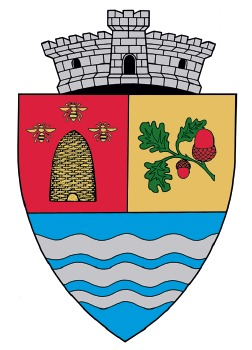
- Flag Coat of arms

- Location in Timiș County

- Location in Romania
- Coordinates: 45.755°N 21.3811°E
- Country: Romania
- County: Timiș

Government
  - Mayor (2020–): Gheorghe Pop (PSD)
- Area: 32.58 km^{2} (12.58 sq mi)
- Population (2021-12-01): 2,512
  - Density: 77.10/km^{2} (199.7/sq mi)
- Time zone: UTC+02:00 (EET)
  - Summer (DST): UTC+03:00 (EEST)
- Postal code: 307351–307352
- Vehicle reg.: TM
- Website: www.comunabucovat.ro

Bucovăț (Hungarian: Bükkfalva, lit. "small village"; German: Bukowetz; Serbian: Буковац, romanized: Bukovac) is a commune in Timiș County, Romania. It is composed of two villages, Bazoșu Nou and Bucovăț (commune seat). Part of the commune of Remetea Mare until 2007, it was established as a separate commune in that year.

== Geography ==
Bucovat is located 16 km (9.9 mi) from Timișoara and 51 km (32 mi) from Lugoj, in the center of Timiș County. Bucovăț lies in the Tisa Plain, a low plain that overlaps the Bega–Timiș interfluve, with altitudes of 80–90 m (260–300 ft). The hydrographic network is represented, as previously mentioned, by Bega and Timiș rivers. Timiș, with large level variations but with a small drainage slope, which explains its rather meandering course, is dammed, and Bega, which separates Bucovăț from Remetea Mare, for the most part with an almost constant and adjustable flow, is channeled and dammed.

=== Climate ===
The climate can be characterized as a plain climate, at the limit of interference between the western subtype with oceanic nuances and the Banat subtype with sub-Mediterranean nuances. The average annual temperature is 10.6 °C (51.1 °F), and the average annual rainfall is 631 mm (24.8 in), with the observation that if in the summer there is a deficit of rainfall, in the rest of the year there are surpluses of water both in the soil and on its surface, with negative influences on the balanced development of agricultural crops.

=== Flora ===
The area is characterized by a humid forest-steppe vegetation. The forests occupy small areas, among them the one from Bazoș, a dendrological scientific reserve, with an area of 60 ha (150 acres), which preserves indigenous and exotic forest species from the North American and Asian flora, the collection comprising a number of 800 taxa. The main natural wood species are represented by Quercus pedunculiflora (greyish oak), Quercus petraea (sessile oak), Acer campestre (field maple), Fraxinus excelsior (ash) and Ulmus spp. (elm), the undergrowth species being mainly represented by Cornus sanguinea (dogwood), Crataegus monogyna (hawthorn), Prunus spinosa (blackthorn) and Rosa canina (dog rose). Along the rivers, species such as Salix alba (white willow), Salix × fragilis (crack willow), Populus alba (silver poplar) and Populus nigra (black poplar) are dominant. The trees usually cultivated are plum, apple, cherry, quince and pear, and along the roads, mulberry and locust.

Spontaneous grassy vegetation is generally represented by species such as Gypsophila muralis (cushion baby's-breath), Setaria viridis (green foxtail), Cynodon dactylon (dog's tooth grass), Cirsium arvense (creeping thistle), Papaver rhoeas (red poppy), Chenopodium album (wild spinach), Erigeron canadensis (horseweed), Centaurea cyanus (cornflower), Polygonum aviculare (knotgrass), Persicaria hydropiper (water pepper), Convolvulus arvensis (field bindweed), Trifolium arvense (hare's-foot clover), Trifolium repens (white clover), Trifolium hybridum (alsike clover), Equisetum arvense (field horsetail), Symphytum officinale (comfrey), Plantago lanceolata (ribwort plantain), Ranunculus spp. (buttercups) and Mentha spp. (mint). In areas with excess humidity, hygrophilous species such as Carex spp. (true sedges), Juncus spp. (rushes), Rumex crispus (curly dock) and Ranunculus spp. (buttercups) can be seen.

== History ==
Archaeological traces dating back to the Iron Age, but especially the Neolithic, have been discovered in Bucovăț. The Roman earth mounds that stretch from Remetea to Dragșina are still visible. Bucovăț is first mentioned in 1492 in a diploma granting Bucov the status of town. The written records after the conquest of Banat by the Habsburgs document the village with the name Bucova. Initially, the hearth of the village was located on a swampy area, on the banks of a stream called Bârnar. Due to the numerous floods, the village was moved to its current hearth. By 1720, the inhabitants moved completely to the new settlement and in addition, Romanian families from Oltenia arrived here, whom the locals called "peasants", from which a street called "peasants' street" remains. The main occupations were animal husbandry and beekeeping. The first school was built around 1774. In 1776, Bucovăț had 82 houses. In 1890 it was part of the Temes County, the district of Recaș. In the 19th century, colonizations were tried with Hungarians, but they left, Bucovăț remaining mostly Romanian.

Bazoșu Nou (formerly known as Colonia Hotar, in Hungarian Határpuszta) was established in 1926, by colonizing with 46 Transylvanian families from Tălmăcel, Sibiu. For the establishment of the village, a lowland place was chosen, between the forests, on the estate of the former owner Lajos Ambrózy. The name was taken from the neighboring locality, Bazoș, which is only 6 km away. From its establishment until today, it has been inhabited only by Romanians.

== Demographics ==
Ethnic composition (2021)
1. Romanians (85.6%)
2. Unknown (11.9%)
3. Others (2.44%)
Religious composition (2021)
1. Orthodox (79.6%)
2. Roman Catholics (2.42%)
3. Baptists (1.35%)
4. Unknown (13.1%)
5. Others (2.74%)
6. Irreligious, atheists and agnostics (0.83%)

Bucovăț had a population of 2,512 inhabitants at the 2021 census, up 56.91% from the 2011 census. Most inhabitants are Romanians (85.62%). For 11.94% of the population, ethnicity is unknown. By religion, most inhabitants are Orthodox (79.57%), but there are also minorities of Roman Catholics (2.42%) and Baptists (1.35%). For 13.09% of the population, religious affiliation is unknown.

Census		Ethnic composition
Year	Population	Romanians	Hungarians	Germans	Roma
1880	1,430	1,220	169	39	–
1890	1,603	1,240	202	89	–
1900	1,634	1,366	205	46	–
1910	1,614	1,151	334	57	57
1920	1,314	1,072	193	31	–
1930	1,407	1,214	99	27	61
1941	1,426	1,275	112	31	–
1956	1,354	–	–	–	–
1966	1,420	1,209	92	9	103
1977	1,752	1,606	92	7	46
1992	1,328	1,179	28	2	113
2002	1,410	1,281	34	–	75
2011	1,601	1,427	22	–	45
2021	2,512	2,151	25	–	11

== Politics and administration ==
The commune of Bucovăț is administered by a mayor and a local council composed of 11 councilors. The mayor, Gheorghe Pop, from the Social Democratic Party, has been in office since 2020. As from the 2024 local elections, the local council has the following composition by political parties:

Party	Seats	Composition
Social Democratic Party–National Liberal Party	6	
Save Romania Union–People's Movement Party–Force of the Right	3	
Alliance for the Union of Romanians	1	
Social Liberal Humanist Party	1	
