= Group for Social Dialogue =

Romanian human rights organization

The Group for Social Dialogue (Romanian: Grupul pentru Dialog Social, GDS) is a Romanian non-governmental organization whose stated mission is to protect and promote democracy, human rights and civil liberties. It was founded in January 1990 and issues the weekly magazine Revista 22.

On 31 December 1989, The Group for Social Dialogue – with only 15 members – organized a press conference at the InterContinental Bucharest in which participants announced the intentions of the group. Their constitution declaration specified the group's intentions and the values shared by all the members.

In January 1990, it was the host of the first official visit in Romania of philanthropist George Soros.

The group pursues its goals mainly by engaging in dialogue with various society components, as well as the executive and legislative branches. The GDS is not a political organization, and stresses that it does not intend to become one. However it is noted for its support for the right wing.

They started a political magazine, Revista 22, on 20 January 1990.

== Notable members ==
- Călin Anastasiu
- Vlad Alexandrescu
- Sorin Alexandrescu
- Gabriela Adameşteanu
- Cătălin Avramescu
- Radu Bercea
- Theodor Baconschi
- Magda Cârneci
- Mariana Celac
- Vitalie Ciobanu
- Adrian Cioroianu
- Eugen Ciurtin
- Andrei Cornea
- Doina Cornea
- Livius Ciocârlie
- Mircea Diaconu
- Smaranda Enache
- Radu Filipescu
- Armand Goşu
- Stere Gulea
- Thomas Kleininger
- Gabriel Liiceanu
- Alexandru Lăzescu
- Monica Macovei
- Mircea Martin
- Horea Murgu
- Andrei Oișteanu
- Marius Oprea
- Anca Oroveanu
- Rodica Palade
- Răsvan Popescu
- Horia Roman Patapievici
- Dan Perjovschi
- Andrei Pleșu
- Cristian Preda
- Victor Rebengiuc
- Mihai Şora
- Ana Şincai
- Ioan Stanomir
- Alin Teodorescu
- Sorin Vieru
- Alexandru Tocilescu
- Vladimir Tismăneanu
- Florin Turcanu
- Ion Vianu
- Şerban Rădulescu Zoner
