= Horia-Roman Patapievici =

Romanian public intellectual (born 1957)

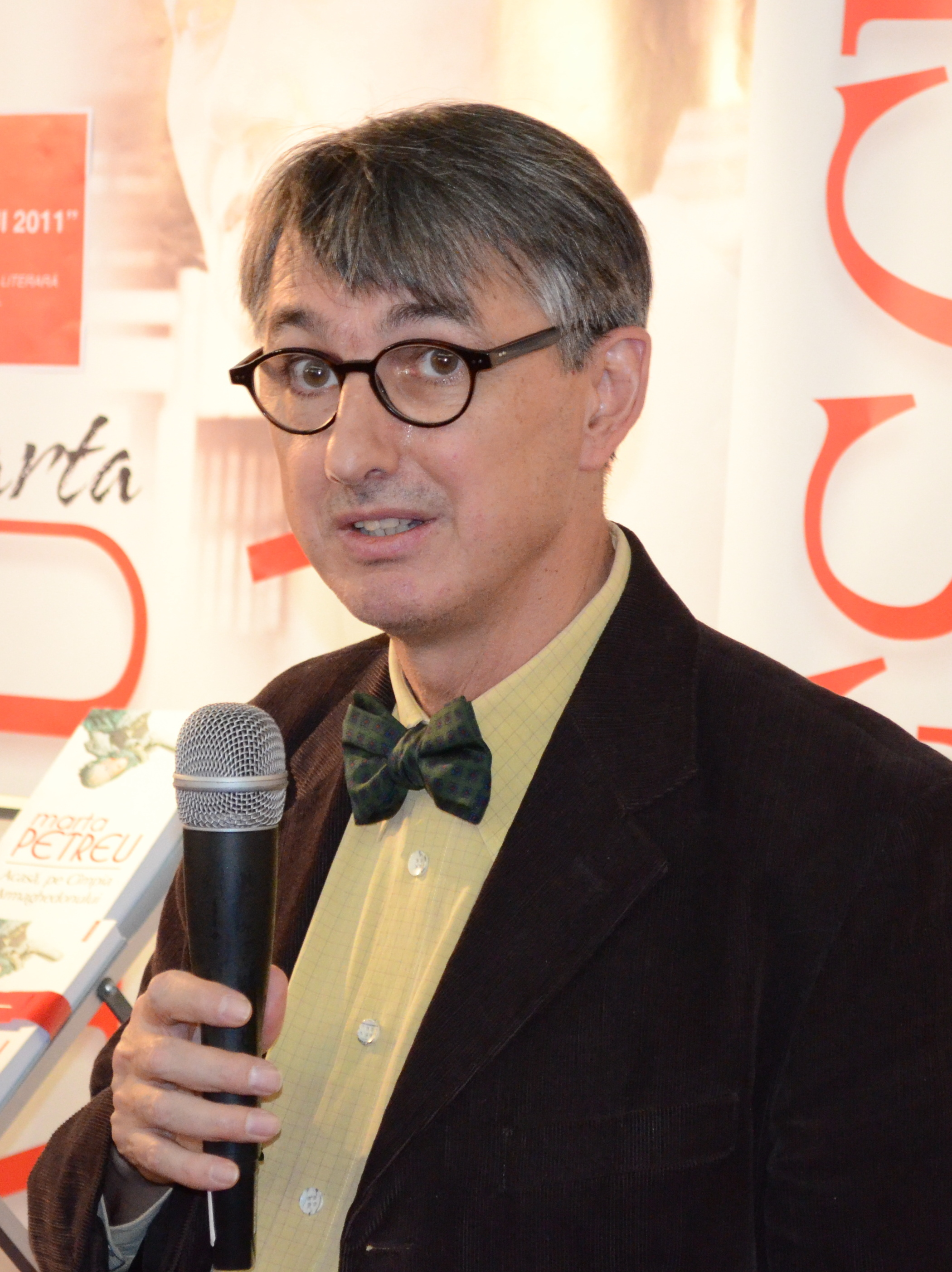
Horia-Roman Patapievici, at Gaudeamus Book Fair 2011

Horia-Roman Patapievici (Romanian pronunciation: [ˈhori.a ˈroman pataˈpjevit͡ʃʲ]; born March 18, 1957) is a Romanian conservative and classical liberal writer, physicist, and essayist who served as the head of the Romanian Cultural Institute from 2005 until August 2012. Between 2000 and 2005, he was a member of the National Council for the Study of the Securitate Archives, supporting more openness regarding the files of the Securitate.

== Biography ==
Denis Patapievici, his father, moved from Cernăuți (now in Ukraine) to Occupied Poland in 1940, after the Soviet Union occupied and took away northern Bukovina from Romania. Horia Roman Patapievici was born in Bucharest and graduated from the University of Bucharest's Faculty of Physics in 1981, where he specialized in the study of lasers. Between 1986 and 1994, he worked as a scientific researcher at the Academy Institute, during which time he also worked as a university assistant at the Polytechnic University of Bucharest between 1990 and 1994.

Patapievici then served as the director of Center for German studies at the University of Bucharest from 1994 until 1996, after which he served until 2000 as the program director of the Group for Social Dialogue (GDS). He is also a member of the Writers' Union of Romania, one of the founders of the Research Group for Essentials in European Modernity, and an honorary member of the Ludwig von Mises Institute.

His debut as an essayist was in 1992, in the Contrapunct journal, and since then he had various contributions in the Revista 22, LA&I, Dilema (now Dilema Veche), Orizont, Vatra, Secolul 20, ID. He wrote editorials in 22 (1993–2003), LA&I (2003–2004), Dilema Veche (2004–2005), ID (since 2005), and Evenimentul Zilei (since 2006).

Patapievici was also a TV producer for two shows for TVR Cultural: "Idei în libertate" (2002) and "Înapoi la argument" (2005).

In 2004, Patapievici started working as the director of a cultural journal, Idei în dialog (Ideas in dialogue), published by the Academia Caţavencu Trust.

Patapievici married in 1981 and has one son, born in 1989.

== Career in public office ==
=== National Council for the Study of the Securitate Archives ===
In December 1999, Patapievici was nominated by the National Peasants' Party to be a member of the National Council for the Study of the Securitate Archives, an institution which has the purpose to study the files of the Securitate, the secret service of the communist-era Romania.

Patapievici was initially rejected by the Parliamentary committee by a vote of eight to six. While Patapievici met the legal criteria for the position, his candidacy was opposed by representative members of the other political parties. Democratic Party Senator Casimir Ionesco, whose post-Revolution actions had been criticized earlier in one of Patapievici's books, took a leading role in opposing Patapievici's candidacy, claiming that his application would bring a defiant and revanchist attitude to the committee.

Following the demand of the National Peasants' Party, the issue of Patapievici's candidacy was reopened in late January 2000, the Parliamentary committee approving his candidacy, despite a dissent of the Greater Romania Party representative, Dumitru Bălăeț, who accused Patapievici of lack of patriotism based on some of his previous writings in his book "Politics".

The council met some difficulties in obtaining some documents from the Romanian Intelligence Service's archive, and because of this, Patapievici, together with Mircea Dinescu and Andrei Pleșu began boycotting the council in October 2001, while demanding full access in the SRI's archives.

The activity of the council, which investigated the former collaborators of the Securitate, drew criticism from the far-right Greater Romania Party. Daniela Buruiană claimed that Patapievici, Dinescu, and Pleșu help foreign secret services which want to discredit the Romanian state institutions, prompting them to announce that they'll sue her.

In September 2002, the council decided to publish a list of the former Securitate officers who were involved in the political police. The Romanian intelligence agency, SRI, initially opposed this, but, following a meeting between the council and SRI, they reached an agreement. Nevertheless, Patapievici argued that the council is blocked because of political reasons.

The following month, Patapievici, together with Pleșu and Dinescu attempted to change the head of the council, Gheorghe Onișoru, who, they argued, sided with the SRI in attempting to open up more of Securitate's files, but they failed in gathering the six needed votes among the eleven council members.

The activity of the council continued slowly, publishing the first list of 33 officers of Securitate in October 2003. There were a few attempts of ousting the Patapievici, Pleșu, and Dinescu trio, especially from the Social-Democrats and the Greater Romania Party, but eventually they gave in to public pressure and canceled them.

Before the 2004 Romanian presidential election, the council decided that Corneliu Vadim Tudor was not a Securitate informer, with a minority dissenting view (Patapievici, Pleșu, Dinescu, and Secasiu). Pleșu and Dinescu resigned in protest and Patapievici announced he'd do the same thing after the elections.

=== Romanian Cultural Institute (ICR) ===
In January 2005, Traian Băsescu, the then newly elected President of Romania, named Patapievici as the new head of the Romanian Cultural Institute (ICR), replacing a 15-year rule of Augustin Buzura. While by statute this position is appointed directly by the Romanian president, who is honorary president of the ICR, some political opponents criticized the method of appointment, arguing that the process is conducted without competition or a debate.

Patapievici began a reform inside the Institute with a new vision under which the Institute would focus on facilitating cultural exchanges and cultural mediation rather than producing culture. As part of his reform efforts, the Institute decided to suspend seven of nine magazines previously published under Patapievici's predecessor on the grounds that the taxpayer-funded magazines were financially unsustainable in the face of increasing monthly losses, declining circulation and rising publication costs.

In June 2012 the newly elected government under Prime Minister Victor Ponta, member of the Social Democratic Party (PSD) and its leader since 2010, moved to transfer control of the ICR and its resources from the Office of the Romanian President to that of the Romanian Senate.

On August 1, 2012, Patapievici, the two ICR vice presidents, and the ICR managing team resigned to protest the transfer of power, the announced budget cuts, and what they considered the politicization of Romanian culture.

== Political views and criticisms ==
Patapievici is a supporter of libertarian economic policies, arguing that it is "the most efficient cure against the laziness of thought". In 2006, during a debate over the display of Orthodox Christian icons in classrooms, he defended such display, labeling the people who opposed it as "human rights fanatics".

Patapievici has also occasionally come under criticism from political detractors and from opponents of President Băsescu, with whom he has long had a good relationship. An example of this was in 2007 when Patapievici defended Băsescu when the parliament had begun an impeachment procedure against the President. Patavievici blamed the disagreements between the presidents and prime-ministers on the Romanian Constitution. Critics of Băsescu labeled Patapievici and two other supporters at the time, Gabriel Liiceanu, and Vladimir Tismăneanu, as "Băsescu's intellectuals", a label that the three dismissed.

Patapievici was again criticized by some when he publicly defended an alleged action by Băsescu during the 2009 Romanian presidential campaign. On the day of the election, Catalan newspaper La Vanguardia published an interview in which Patapievici was asked about a video recording that had been repeatedly broadcast in Romanian media and which allegedly depicted Băsescu hitting a 10-year-old boy. Patapievici said that he thought Băsescu only pushed the child, and that Băsescu's error was that he did not deny it immediately. Patapievici then compared the incident with the Lewinsky scandal, and, to illustrate his view that Băsescu was a good man, added that he had heard that the president Traian Băsescu had refused to use a tape offered to his campaign that reputedly depicted political opponent Mircea Geoană receiving sexual favors.

While the Spanish interviewer later clarified that Patapievici did not make any actual claim about the existence of the reputed tape or its authenticity, the Spanish language depiction of the Patapievici interview was covered in the Romanian press and met with a strong reaction from Mircea Geoană, who called it a "sinister lie".

Both Traian Băsescu's spokesman, Sever Voinescu, and Valeriu Turcan, the spokesman of the Romanian presidency, denied that either Băsescu or the campaign team was ever aware of any such video Patapievici himself denied ever making the accusation and claimed that his words were intentionally mischaracterized and taken out of context by his accusers, clarifying in a statement that he "only mentioned the tape to emphasize the difference in attitude between Băsescu and his opponents." To support his denial, he cited an e-mail sent in English by the Spanish interviewer, Félix Flores: "Mr. Patapievici did not mentioned [sic] the existence of any tape about Mr. Geoană: he just said that Mr. Băsescu was offered such a thing and he rejected it. He was not talking about videos -true or fake or may not exist- or against anybody but about Mr. Băsescu's moral attitude."

== Works ==
- Cerul vazut prin lentilă (The Sky seen through the Lens), 1995
- Zbor în bătaia săgeții (Flight within Arrow's Reach), 1995
- Politice (Politics), 1996
- Omul recent (The Recent Man), 2001
- Spărtura din cer (The breach in the sky), audiobook, 2003
- Schimbarea subiectului – o reverie (The change of subject – a reverie), audiobook, 2004
- Ochii Beatricei (Beatrice's Eyes), 2004
- Discernământul modernizării (Discernment of Modernization), 2004

Other:

- David Bohm, Plenitudinea lumii și ordinea ei (The Wholeness of the World and the Implicate Order), translation, in collaboration, 1995.

== Awards ==
- Essay Prize of the Publishing House Nemira, 1993
- Début Prize of the Association of Professional Writers, 1995
- Prize for Journalism of the Cultural Magazine "Cuvintul", 1995
- Man of the Year Prize of the Cultural Magazine "Cuvintul", 1995
- "Alexandra Indries" Prize of "Societatea Timișoara", 1995
- National Board for Audio-Visual Prize, best cultural TV Production, 2003
- APTR Prize (Romanian Association of the Professionals in Television).
