= Mihai Șora =

Romanian philosopher and essayist (1916–2023)

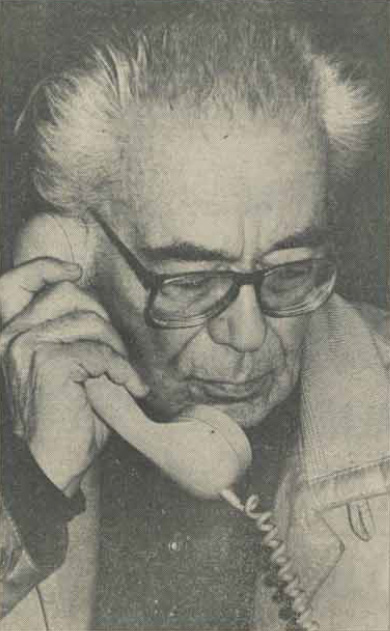
- Șora c. 1990, picture published in Revista 22

Minister of Education
- In office 26 December 1989 – 28 June 1990
- Prime Minister: Petre Roman
- Preceded by: Ion Teoreanu
- Succeeded by: Gheorghe Ștefan

Personal details
- Born: 7 November 1916 Temesremete, Austria-Hungary (now Remetea Mare, Romania)
- Died: 25 February 2023 (aged 106) Bucharest, Romania
- Resting place: Bellu Cemetery
- Spouse(s): Mariana Klein (m. 1939; died 2011) Luiza Palanciuc (m. 2014–2023)
- Children: 3
- Education: University of Bucharest; University of Paris; French National Centre for Scientific Research
- Writing career
- Language: Romanian; French

Mihai Șora (Romanian pronunciation: [miˈhaj ˈʃora]; 7 November 1916 – 25 February 2023) was a Romanian philosopher and essayist.

== Career ==
After travelling back to Romania in 1948, Șora became a member of the Romanian Communist Party (PCR) and was employed by the Ministry of Foreign Affairs, at the time led by communist leader Ana Pauker. In interviews published after the fall of Communist Party rule in 1989, Șora said that he was unofficially "arrested". He was barred from holding a teaching appointment in Communist Romania, but nevertheless became an influential editor for one of the main Romanian publishers, ESPLA. Șora's family emigrated to the West in the 1970s, and he was allowed to visit them in the 1980s. According to Aurelia Crăiuțu, he was forced to publish under pseudonyms rather than use his own name. However, Șora was still able to publish his third book in 1985.

In March 1989, he joined intellectuals protesting the treatment of dissident poet Mircea Dinescu. After the fall of Nicolae Ceaușescu in December 1989, he briefly served as minister of education in Petre Roman's post-revolutionary coalition. He was one of only two cabinet members to endorse the March 1990 Timișoara Proclamation, which unsuccessfully proposed a law to prevent former Securitate members from occupying leading political positions. He was a member of the Group for Social Dialogue, writing for its weekly publication Revista 22, and the Civic Alliance Foundation, which later became the Civic Alliance Party (PAC).

In 2022, Walt Disney Pictures choose in premiere Șora to provide the Romanian voice of Talent Scout in The Fox and the Hound 2; at 106 years old, he became the oldest personality in the world to do a voice over in a movie/animation.

== Personal life ==
Șora was born in Ianova, Timiș County, the son of an Orthodox priest. He studied philosophy at the University of Bucharest from 1934 to 1938, where he was a student of Mircea Eliade. From 1939 to 1948 he studied in Paris and Grenoble on a fellowship granted by the French government. He joined the French Communist Party during this period.

Șora was married twice: the first time to writer Mariana Klein (1917–2011), in 1939, with whom he had three children, and the second time to Luiza Palanciuc, an essayist and poet, in 2014. He turned 100 in November 2016. Șora died on 25 February 2023, at the age of 106.
