= Vasile Baghiu =

Romanian poet and writer

Vasile Baghiu (born 1965) is a Romanian poet and writer.

== Biography ==
He was born in Borlești, Neamț County.

He has published many volumes of poetry and fiction till date. His work is influenced by his early career as a nurse in a TB sanatorium, and is known for coining the poetic concept of 'chimerism'. In 1998, he published the prison memoirs of his father who had spent time in Soviet POW camps.

Baghiu now lives and works as a psychologist in Piatra Neamț.

He is a member of the Romanian branch of PEN. His work has appeared in English translation in different magazines and anthologies abroad such as Banipal, Cordite Poetry Review, Magma Poetry, Penmen Review. The Aalitra Review.

== Works ==
- 1994: Gustul înstrăinării (The Alienation's Taste, poems), Timpul, Iași
- 1996: Rătăcirile doamnei Bovary (Madame Bovary's Wanderings, poems), Eminescu, Bucharest
- 1996: Febra (The Fevre, poems), Panteon, Piatra Neamț
- 1998: Maniera (The Manner, poems), Pontica, Bucharest
- 2001: Fantoma sanatoriului (The Sanatorium's Ghost, anthology, poems), Vinea, Bucharest
- 2003: Himerus Alter în Rheinland (Himerus Alter in Rheinland, poems), Vinea, Bucharest
- 2004: Punctul de plecare (The Starting Point, short stories), Compania, Bucharest
- 2006: Ospiciul (The Hospice, novel), Vinea, Bucharest
- 2008: Cât de departe am mers (Haw Far Have We Gone, poems), Limes, Cluj
- 2011: Magia elementara (Elementary Magic, anthology, poems), Dacia XXI, Cluj
- 2011: Gustul înstrainarii (The Alienation's Taste, anthology, selected poems), Tipo Moldova, Iași
- 2012: Depresie (Depression, poems), Limes, Cluj
- 2012: Planuri de viaţă (Plans in Life, novel), Polirom, Iași
- 2014: Fericire sub limite (Happiness under Limits, novel), Charmides, Bistrița
- 2019: Metode simple de încetinire a timpului (Simple Methods to Slow Down Time, poems), Eikon, Bucharest

== Prizes ==
- 1994: „Aurel Dumitrascu“ Prize for the collection of poems "Gustul înstrăinării" (The Alienation's Taste)
- 1995: Prize of the magazin Poesis for the best literary debut
- 1998: Prize of the magazine Poesis for literary critique
- 2007: Prize of the Romanian Writers’ Union (Jassy), for the novel „Ospiciul“ (The Hospice)
- 2013: Prize “Mihai Ursachi” for the poetry collection “Depression”
- 2012: Prize “Liviu Rebreanu” (Bistrita), for the novel „Planuri de viata" (Plans in Life“

== Literary Residencies/Grants ==
- 2002: Heinrich-Böll-Haus Langenbroich (Germany)
- 2003: Künstlerdorf Schöppingen (Germany)
- 2006: Kulturkontakt Austria, Vienna (Austria)
- 2006: Cove Park (Scotland)
- 2006: Künstlerwohnung Chretzeturm, Stein am Rhein (Switzerland)
- 2011: Villa Sträuli, Winterthur (Switzerland)
