= Dan Perjovschi =

Romanian artist, writer and cartoonist

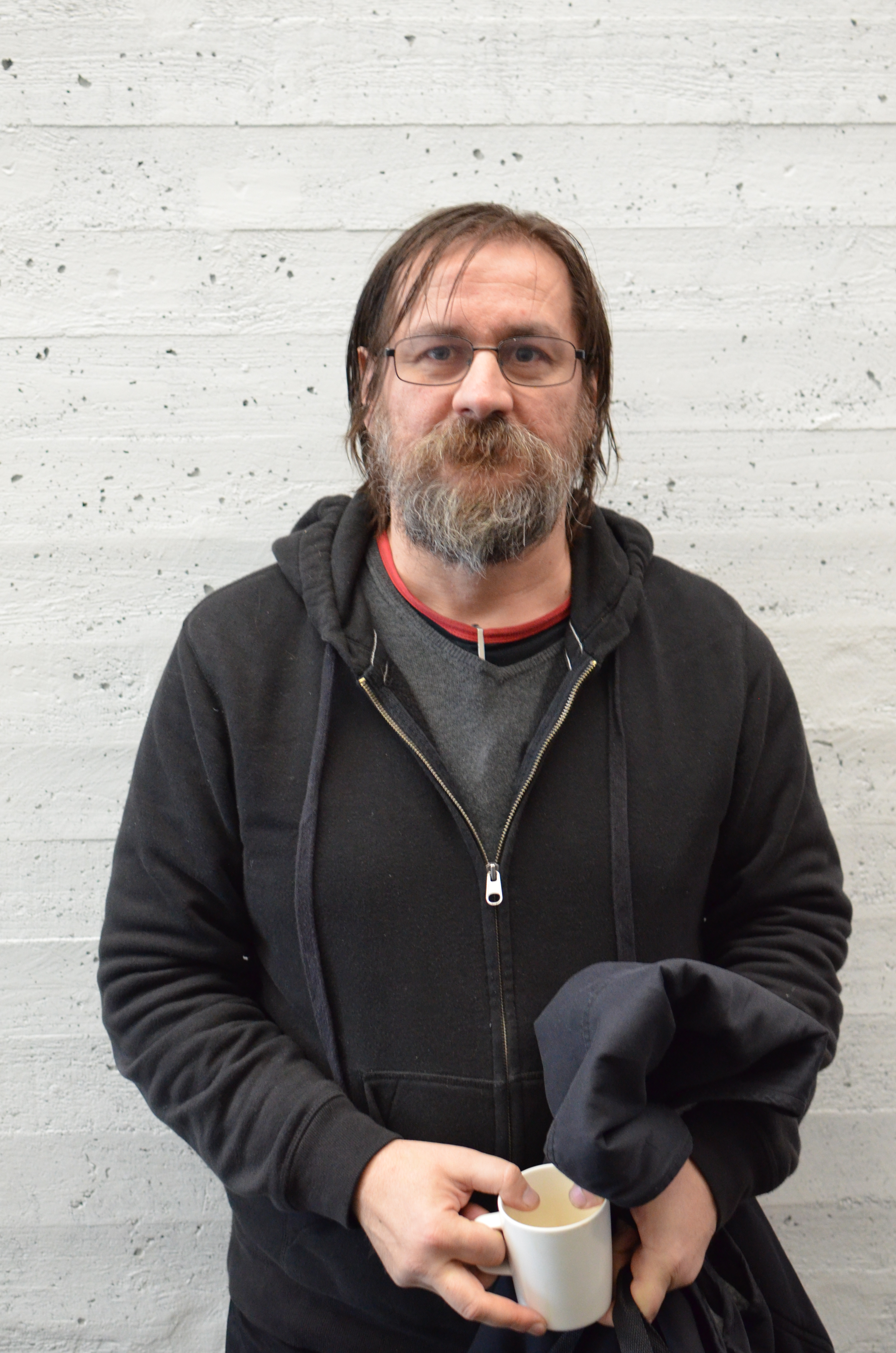
- Dan Perjovschi standing in front of a white brick wall of Kiasma
- Born: 29 October 1961 (age 64); Sibiu, Romania
- Known for: Visual art

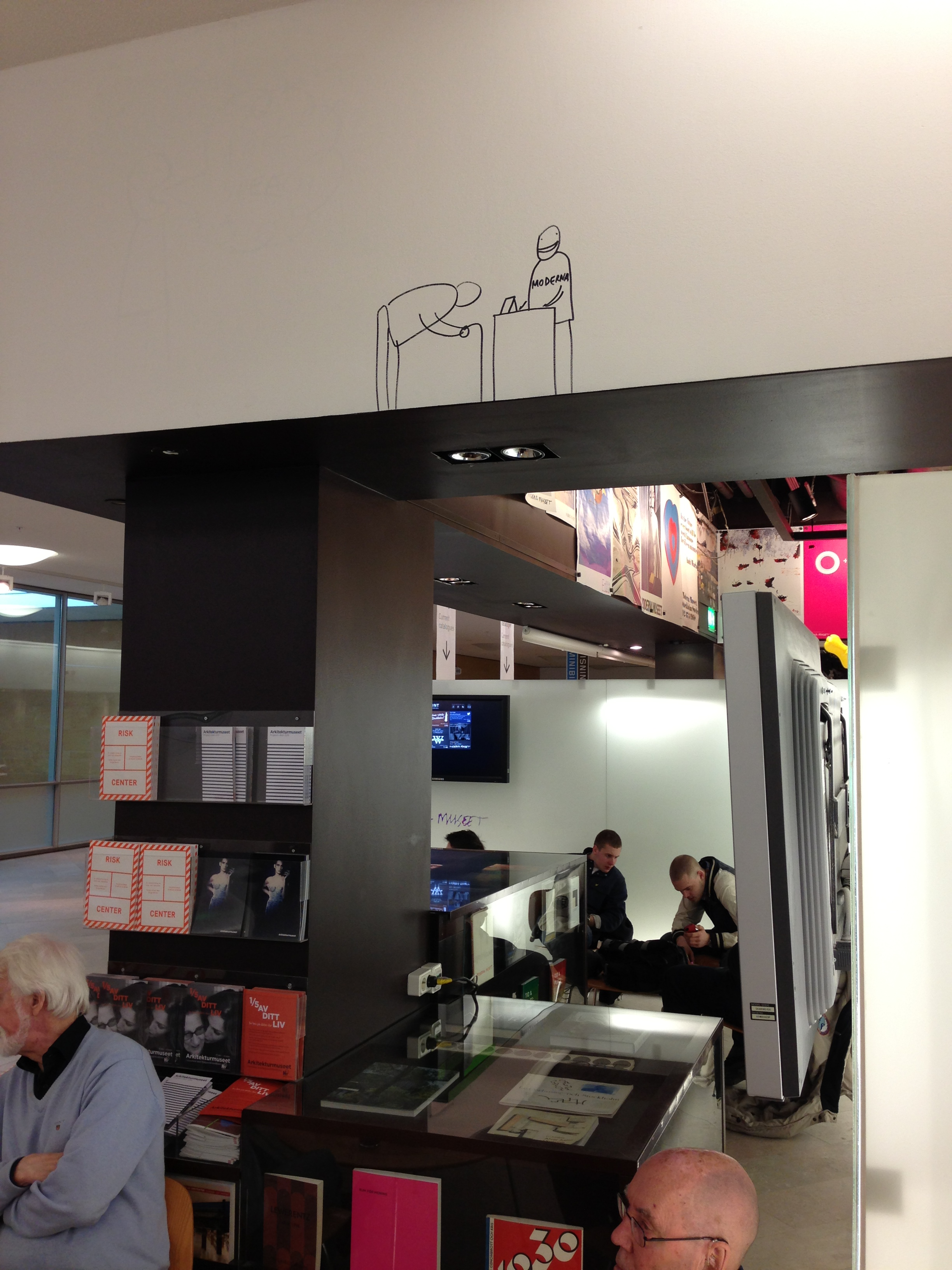
A drawing by Dan Perjovschi in the entrance of Moderna Museet in Stockholm, 2013

Dan Perjovschi is an artist, writer and cartoonist born on 29 October 1961 in Sibiu, Romania.

Perjovschi has over the past decade created drawings in museum spaces, most recently in the Museum of Modern Art in New York City in which he created the drawing during business hours for patrons to see. The drawings present a political commentary in response to current events. Another exhibition of Perjovschi's within a Portuguese bank consists of several comic strip style drawings which address more European issues such as Romania's acceptance to the EU and abortion legalization in Portugal.

Dan and Lia Perjovschi had their first retrospective exhibition at the Nasher Museum of Art at Duke University in fall 2007.

In 2009 Dan Perjovschi created his first permanent realisation in Czech National Library of Technology in Prague. It consists of 200 monumental drawings on the concrete walls of main atrium of the building.

In 2010, Dan Perjovschi served as an International Artist in Residence at the University of Kansas Spencer Museum of Art in Lawrence, Kansas. He created an installation in the museum's Central Court and engaged with students from various departments at KU.

In March 2013 Dan and Lia Perjovschi were awarded with the European Cultural Foundation's Princess Margriet Award.

His work reflects social and civic issues of interest and as such it is often printed out and used during protests.

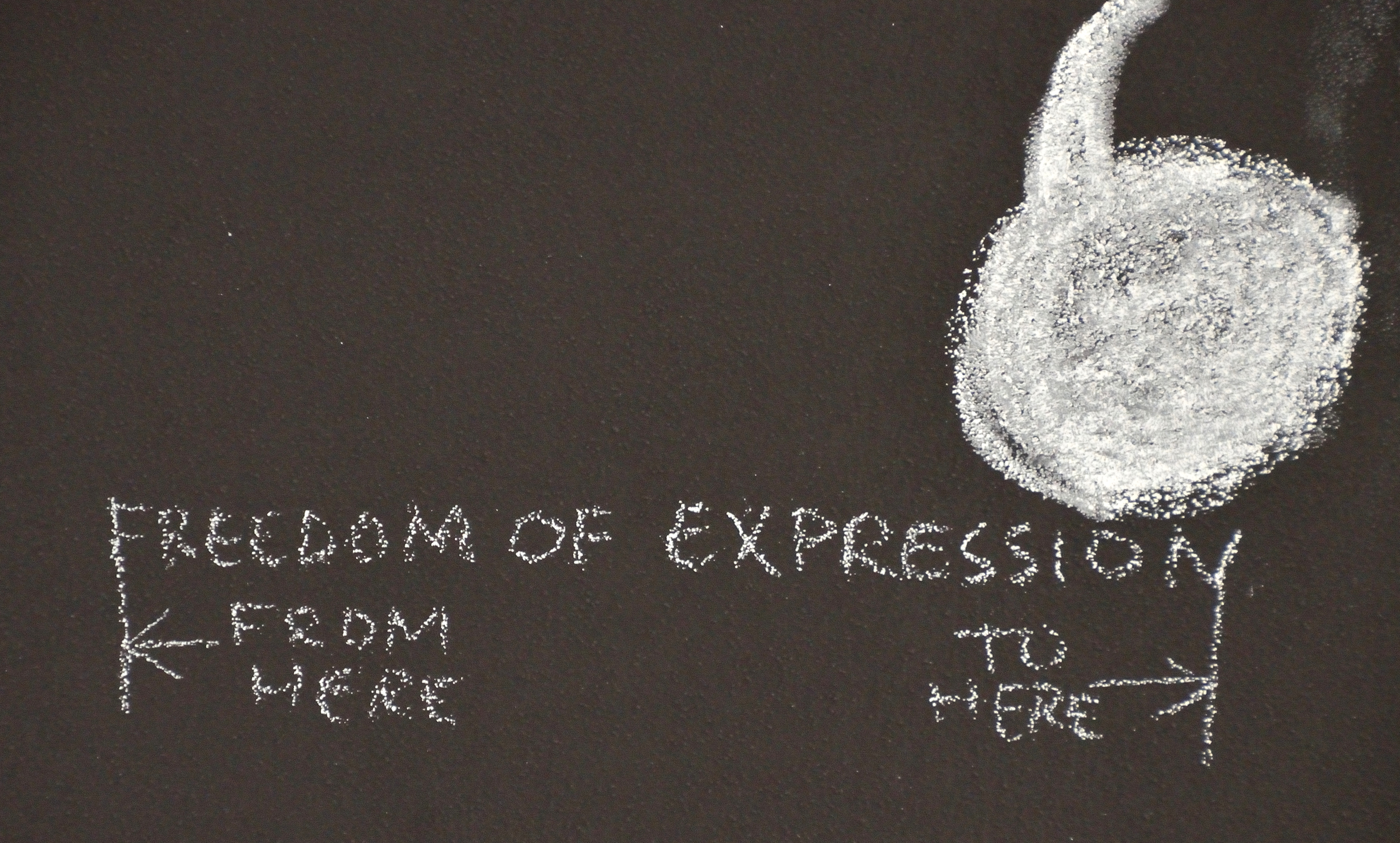
Black belt drawing by Dan Perjovschi at MuseumsQuartier,

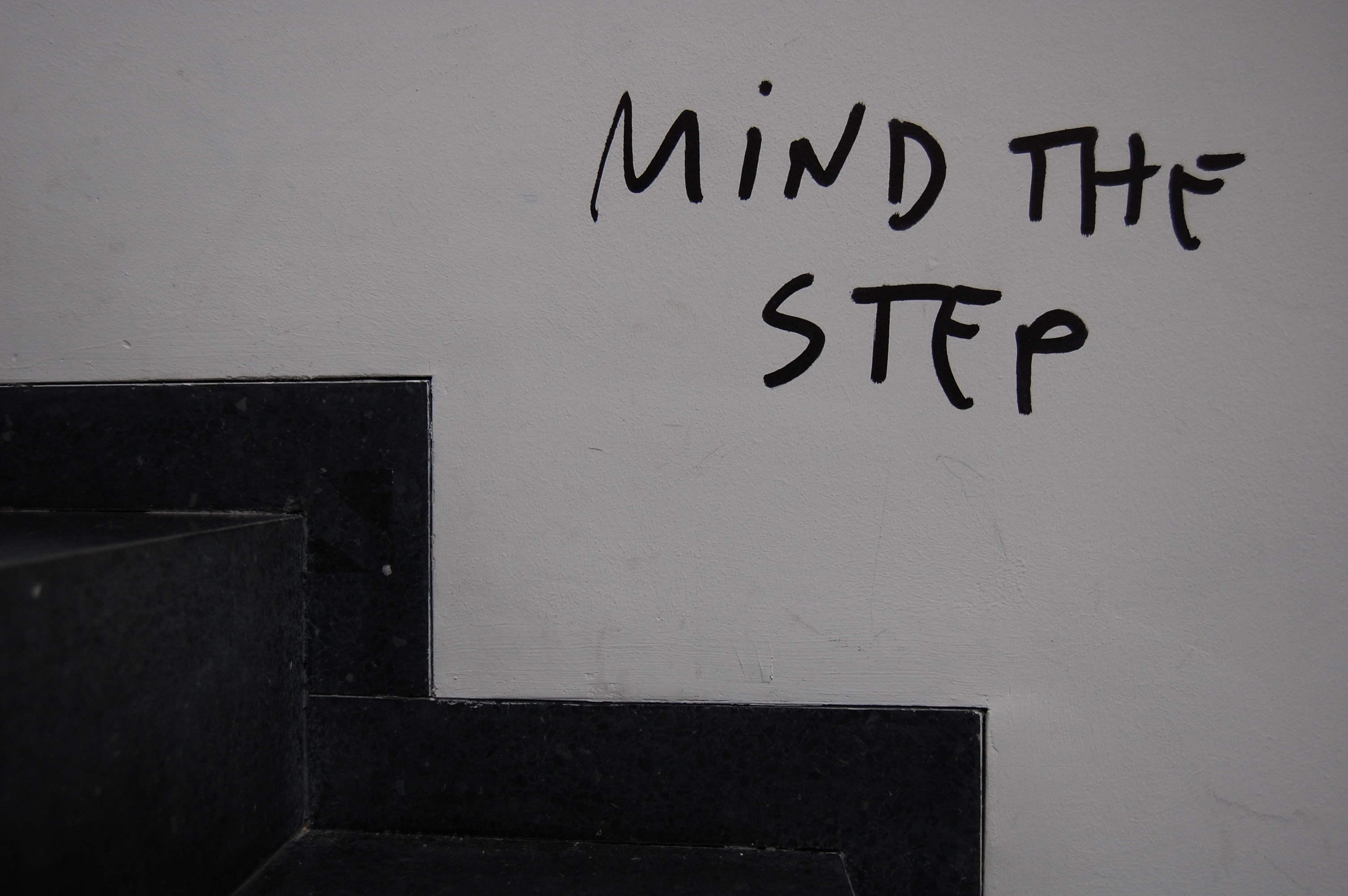
Dan Perjovschi- Mind the step, Van Abbemuseum, 2010

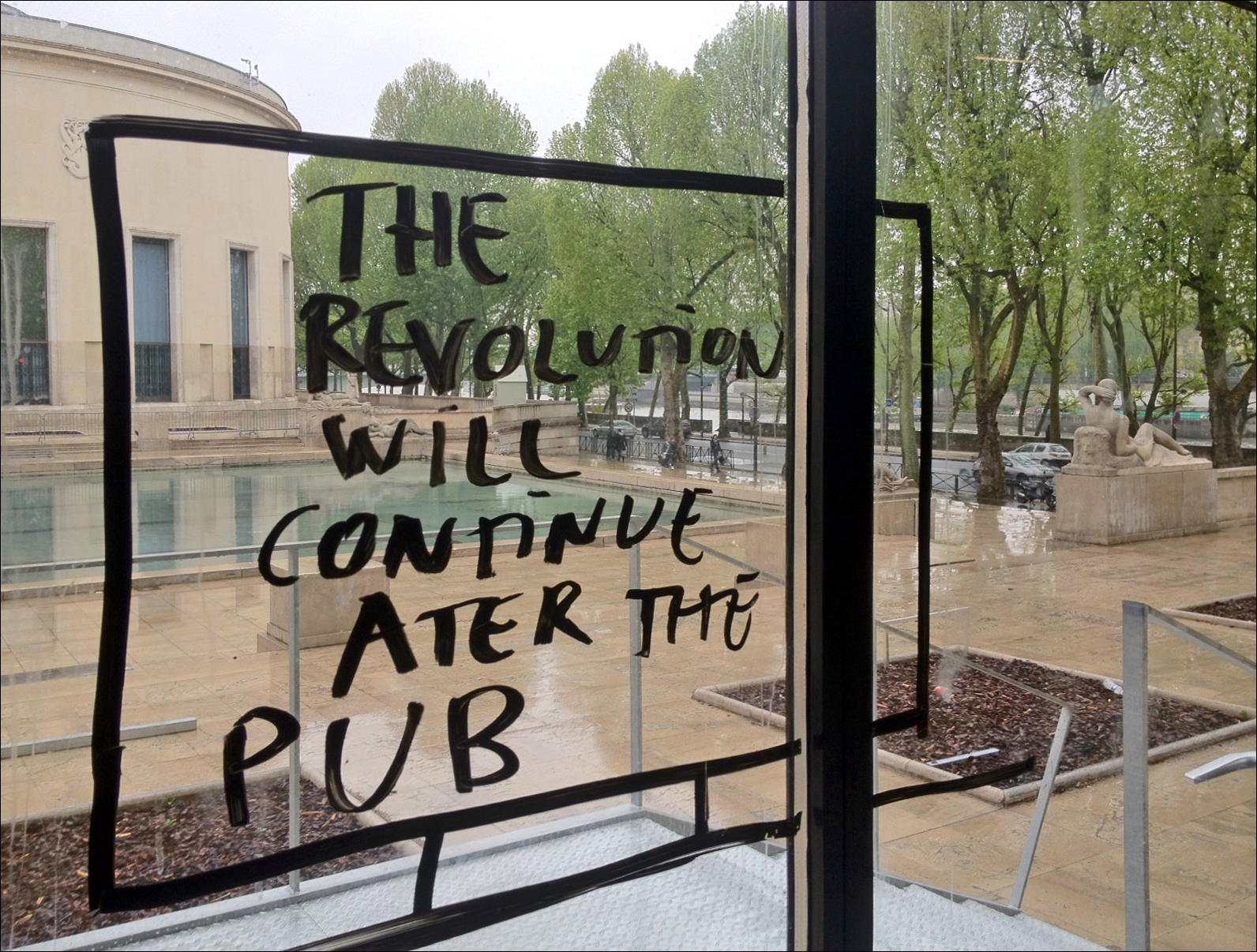
Dan Perjovschi at Triennale, Palais de Tokyo, 2012

== Authored Books ==
- Postcards from America. Edited by Karen Davidson. Essay by Kristine Stiles. New York: Pont La Vue Press, 1995.
- Castle Stories. Edited by Patricia Corbett. La Napoule, France: Edition La Mancha and La Napoule Art Foundation, 2000.
- Vis-à-vis, Editura Nemira, București, 2000.
- I Draw - I Happy. Edited by Lutz Becker. Koln: Schnittraum and Verlag der Buchhandlung Walter König, 2004.
- Toutes Directions. Edited by Dominique Abensour and Marc Geerardyn. Quimper, France: Le Quartier Centre d’art contemporain de Quimper, 2005.
- Human Natural Desaster. Edited by Lutz Becker and Uwe Kock, Koln: Flypaper, 2005
- My World- Your Kunstraum, Edited by Stefan Bidner. Innsbruck: Kunstverein and Verlag der Buchhandlung Walter König, 2006.
- Non-Stop 1991-2006: 22 Magazine / Revista 22, București. Paris: Onestar Press, 2006.
- A Book with an Attitude. Edited by Jean Paul Felley and Olivier Kaeser. Edited by Jean-Paul Felley and Olivier Kaeser. Geneva: Edition et Diffusion Attitudes, 2007.
- Postmodern Ex-Communist. Edited by Marius Babias., Sabine Hentsch. Cluj, Romania: IDEA, and Verlag der Buchhandlung Walter König, 2007. ISBN 978-3865602404
- Mad Cow, Bird Flu, Global Village: The Art of Dan Perjovschi. Verso: London 2007. ISBN 978-1844671663
- Love / Fuck, 1968-2007, Edited by Jean-Paul Felley and Olivier Kaeser. Geneva: Edition et Diffusion Attitudes, Kunsthalle Basel, 2008.
- București, Brussel, Chisinau. Edited de Matei Caltia. București, Galeria Posibila 2008
- Lia & Dan Perjovschi: The Cologne Crime, Edition Worpswede 2008. ISBN 978-3941560031
- Dan Perjovschi: Recession. DuMont, 2010. ISBN 978-3832191184
- Temporary Yours, 1995–2012. Idea Editura, Zavod P.A.R.A.S.I.T.E ISBN 978-6068265148
- The Book of Notebooks. Cartea carnetelor, P+4 Publications, 2021. ISBN 9789730348132
