= Magda Cârneci =

Magda Cârneci is a poet, essayist, and art historian born in Romania.

== Career ==
She took a Ph.D. in art history at Ecole des Hautes Etudes en Sciences Sociales in Paris (1997) and received several international grants in literature and art history (Fulbrigt, Soros, Getty, European Community).

Member of the well-known “generation of the ‘80s” in Romanian literature, of which she was one of the theoreticians, after the Revolution of December 1989 she became actively involved in the political and cultural Romanian scene of the 1990s. In the 2000s, after working as a visiting lecturer at the National Institute of Oriental Languages and Civilizations (INALCO) in Paris, she was the director of the Romanian Cultural Institute in Paris (2007 – 2010). At present, she is visiting professor at the National University of Arts in Bucharest, editor-in-chief of ARTA magazine for visual arts, and president of PEN Club Romania. She is also a member of the European Cultural Parliament.

She started her literary career in the România literară magazine, under the pen name Magdalena Ghica, which she used until 1989. She published numerous books of poetry, art criticism, and essays in Romanian and other languages, and her poems have been translated into many languages.

She is affiliated with several organizations, including:

- Founding member and present-day president of the Group for Social Dialogue (GDS), Bucharest
- Member of AICA International
- Member of PEN International; president of PEN Club Romania, 2011 - 2019
- Member of European Cultural Parliament (ECP)
- Member of HGCEA (Historians of Central and East European Art), USA
- Member of CIRET (Centre international de recherches et etudes transdisciplinaires), Paris
- Member of Institut de Neuroconnectique, Paris
- Member of Union of Writers in Romania (USR), Bucharest
- Member of Union of Visual Artists in Romania (UAP), Bucharest

== Works ==
=== Volumes of poetry in Romanian ===
- A Deafening Silence, Eminescu, Bucharest, 1985
- Chaosmos, Cartea Românească, Bucharest, 1992
- Political Poems, Axa, Botoșani, 2000
- Chaosmos and other Poems, anthology, Paralela 45, Bucharest, 2004
- TRANS Poems, Tracus Art, Bucharest, 2012
- Life, Paralela 45, Bucharest, 2016
- Poetic Work, Bucharest, Cartea Româneasca, 2017
- Time of the High Poem, Cartier, Kishinev, 2022
- Insurrections/ Incantations, Editura Casa Radio, 2023

=== Poetry books in foreign languages ===
- Psaume, Marseille : Editions Autres Temps, 1997
- Poeme / Poems, Pitesti : Paralela 45 (in Romanian and English, translated by Adam J.Sorkin)
- Le paradis poétique, Paris : Transignum, 2004 (bibliophile book)
- Chaosmos. Gedichten, Jan Willem Bos translator, Amsterdam: Go-Bos Press, 2004
- Chaosmos. Poems, Adam J.Sorkin translator, Boston: White Pine Press, 2006
- Trois saisons poétiques, Luxembourg : éditions PHI, 2008
- Chaosmos, translated by Linda Maria Baros, Paris : Editions de Corlevour, 2013
- Oh, meine Generation, Dionysos Boppard, Rheinland-Pfalz - 2020, ISBN 979-8-6423-5888-7, Trans: Christian W. Schenk Germany
- Trans-Neuronal, editions Transignum, Paris, 2023
- Vida, Visor Libros, Madrid, 2023

=== Prose ===
- FEM, novel, Bucharest: Cartea Românească, 2011; second Romanian edition Polirom, 2014; French edition 2018; American edition 2021

=== Texts in collective books in French ===
- Paris par écrit, Paris: L’Inventaire/Maison des Ecrivains, 2002
- Le sacré aujourd’hui, Paris: Editions du Rocher, 2003
- Transdisciplinarité - Un chemin vers la paix, Paris: Éditions FBV pour le CNRS, 2005
- La Mort aujourd’hui, Paris: Editions du Rocher, 2008
- Mon royaume pour un livre, Guy Rouquet editor, L’atelier imaginaire/ Le castor astrale, Paris, 2013.
- Pour toutes, la même langue, Parlement des écrivaines francophones, éditions Regain de lecture, 2023
- De Grâce. Anthologie de poèmes inédits, dirigée par Suzanne Dracius, éditions Idem, Paris, 2024

=== Anthologies of poetry ===
- Nuovi poeti romeni, Marco Cugno and Marin Mincu editors, Florence: Vallecchi Editore, 1986
- Incertitudes. Antologie de la poésie roumaine, Dan Deșliu editor, Quebec: Humanitas Nouvelle Qptique, 1992
- Streiflicht: Eine Auswahl zeitgenossischer Rumänisher Lyrik, Christian W. Schenk editor, Kastellaun: Dionysos Verlag, 1994
- Antologia di poesia mediteranea, Marco Cugno editor, Milano: Marzorati, Emanuele Bettini editore, 1996
- Gefährliche Serpentinem. Rumänischer Lyric der Gegenwart, Dieter Schlesak editor, Berlin: Edition Druckhaus, 1998
- Romania and Western Civilisation, Kurt W. Treptow editor, Iassi: The Center for Romanian Studies, 1998
- Day after Night. Twenty Romanian poets for the Twentieth First Century, Gabriel Stănescu and Adam J. Sorkin editors, Norcross: Criterion Publishers, 1999
- STRONG. 28 de poete din România: 28 poetek rumunskich, Denisa Comănescu editor, Bucharest: Universal Dalsi, 1998
- Poètes roumains contemporains, Irina Petraș editor, Montréal/Bucharest: Les Ecrits des forges/Editura didactică și pedagogică, 2000
- Speaking in Silence. Prose Poets of Contemporary Romania, Adam J.Sorkin and Bogdan Stefanescu editors, Bucharest: Paralela 45, 2001
- Poetry is a Woman (11 Woman Poets from Romania), translation into Greek by Sandra Michalaki and Anna Sotrini, Athens: Alpha publishing house, 2006
- Born in Utopia/ Născut în Utopia. An Anthology of Modern and Contemporary Romanian Poetry, edited by Carmen Firan and Paul Doru Mugur with Edward Foster, New Jersey: Talisman House Publishers, 2006
- Poésies de langue française. 144 poètes d’aujourd’hui autour du monde. Anthologie établie par Stephane Bataillon, Bruno Doucey et Sylvestre Clancier, Paris: Seghers, 2008
- Anthologie poétique. 109 poètes femmes contemporaines, sélection d’Angèle Paoli, Terre des femmes, 2010, 2014, p.74. http://terresdefemmes.blogs.com/anthologie_potique/anthologie-po%C3%A9tique-terres-de-femmesprintemps-des-po%C3%A8tes-2010-couleur-femme-.html
- Romanian Writers on Writing, Norman Manea editor, Trinity University Press, San Antonio, Texas, 2011
- Testament - 400 Years of Romanian Poetry - 400 de ani de poezie românească - bilingual edition - Daniel Ioniță (editor and principal translator) with Daniel Reynaud, Adriana Paul & Eva Foster - Editura Minerva, 2019 - ISBN 978-973-21-1070-6
- Romanian Poetry from its Origins to the Present - bilingual edition English/Romanian - Daniel Ioniță (editor and principal translator) with Daniel Reynaud, Adriana Paul and Eva Foster - Australian-Romanian Academy Publishing - 2020 - ISBN 978-0-9953502-8-1; OCLC 1288167046

=== Art critiques ===
==== Essays ====
- Art of the 1980s. Texts on Postmodernism, Bucharest: Litera, 1996 (in Romanian)
- Art of the 1980s in Eastern Europe. Texts on Postmodernism, Pitesti: Paralela 45, 1999 (in English)
- Visual Arts in Romania 1945-1989, Bucharest: Meridiane, București, 2000 (in Romanian)
- Art et pouvoir en Roumanie 1945-1989, Paris: L’Harmattan, 2007 (in French)
- Visual Arts in Romania 1945-1989. With an Addendum 1990-2010, Bucharest: Polirom, 2013 (in Romanian)
- Visual Ars in Romania 1945-1989. With an Addendum 1990-2020, Bucharest: ICR Publishing House, 2022 (in English)

==== Monographs ====
- Ion Ţuculescu, Bucharest: Meridiane, 1984 (in Romanian)
- Lucian Grigorescu, Bucharest: Meridiane, 1989 (in Romanian)

==== Texts in collective volumes ====
- Von der Bürokratie zur Telekratie, Berlin: Merve Verlag, 1990 (in German)
- A Latvany és Gondolat, Bucharest: Editura Kriterion, 1991 (in Hungarian)
- Bucharest in the 1920s-1940s: between Avant-Garde and Modernism, Bucharest: Simetria, 1994 (in Romanian and English)
- The Competition goes on. The 80s Generation in Theoretical Texts. An Anthology by Gh. Crăciun, Pitesti: Ed. Vlasie, 1994; second edition, Paralela 45, 1999 (in Romanian)
- The Moment of Truth. An Anthology by Iordan Chimet, Cluj-Napoca: Dacia, 1996 (in Romanian)
- Experiment in Romanian Arts after 1960, Bucharest: CSAC, 1997 (in Romanian and English)
- Culture of the Time of Transformation, Poznan: WIS Publishers, 1998 (in English and Polish)
- Encyclopedia of Eastern Europe. From the Congress of Vienna to the Fall of Communism, edited by Richard Frucht, Northwest Missouri State University, Garland Publishing, Inc., New York & London, 2000
- European Contemporary Art. The Art of the Balkan Countries, Thessalonica, State Museum of Contemporary Art, 2002
- Perspectives roumaines. Du post-communisme à l’intégration européenne, Catherine Durandin and Magda Carneci editors, Paris : L’Harmattan, 2004
- European art criticism, Stuttgart, Badischer Kunstverein / AVAN network/ Culture 2000, 2005
- Ligeia, Paris, 2005, no. 57-58-59-60, janvier-juin (in French)
- Influences françaises dans l’architecture et l’art de la Roumanie des XIXe et XXe siècles, Bucharest : Editura Institutului Cultural Român, 2006 (in French)
- D’une édification l’autre. Socialisme et nation dans l’espace (post-) communiste, Marlène Laruelle and Catherine Servant editors, Paris : PETRA Editions, 2008 (in French)
- Ligeia, Paris, XXII°année, n° 93-94-95-96, juillet-décembre 2009 (in French)
- The She-writer’s Sofa, Mihaela Ursa editor, Cluj-Napoca: Limes, 2010 (in Romanian)
- Romanian Cultural Resolution, Hatje Cantz Verlag, Germany, 2011 (in German and English)
- Intellectuels de l’Est exilés en France, Wojciech Falkowski and Antoine Marès editors, Paris : Institut d’études slaves, 2011
- Zidaru. Das Work von Marian & Victoria Ziadaru, Essen: Klartext Verlag, 2011
- SAPTE. Metadecorativul/SIEBEN. Das Metadekorativismus, vol III, Bochum: Klartext, 2012 (in German, Romanian, and English)

=== Translations into Romanian ===
- Christopher Merrill, Only Nails Remain. Scenes from the Balkan Wars 1992-1997, together with Radu Sava, Pitesti: Paralela 45, 2002
- Catherine Durandin, Bucharest. Remembrances and Walks, together with Horia Mihail Vasilescu, Pitesti: Paralela 45, 2004
- Nicole Brossard, Installations. Paralela 45/ Montreal: Les Ecrits des Forges, 2005
- Pierre Oster, Alchemy of Slowliness/ Alchimie de la lenteur, Paralela 45/Gallimard, 2007
- Helene Cixous, The Laugh of the Medusa, Bucharest, Tracus Arte, 2021
- Laurine Rousselet, Instantanee/Instantanés, poems, Bistrita, Charmides, 2021
- Jean-Pierre Siméon, Stabat Mater Furiosa, Bistrita, Charmides, 2023
