= Revista 22 =

Romanian magazine

Revista 22 (22 Magazine) is a Romanian weekly magazine, issued by the Group for Social Dialogue and focused mainly on politics and culture.

== History and profile ==
Revista 22 was started in 1990. The first edition of the magazine was printed on 20 January 1990. The magazine was named in memory of 22 December 1989, the day the communist regime in Romania was overthrown. The founder was the Group for Social Dialogue, which is also the publisher. The magazine is published in Bucharest weekly on Tuesdays.
