= Collectivization in Romania =

Collectivization of agriculture in Romania

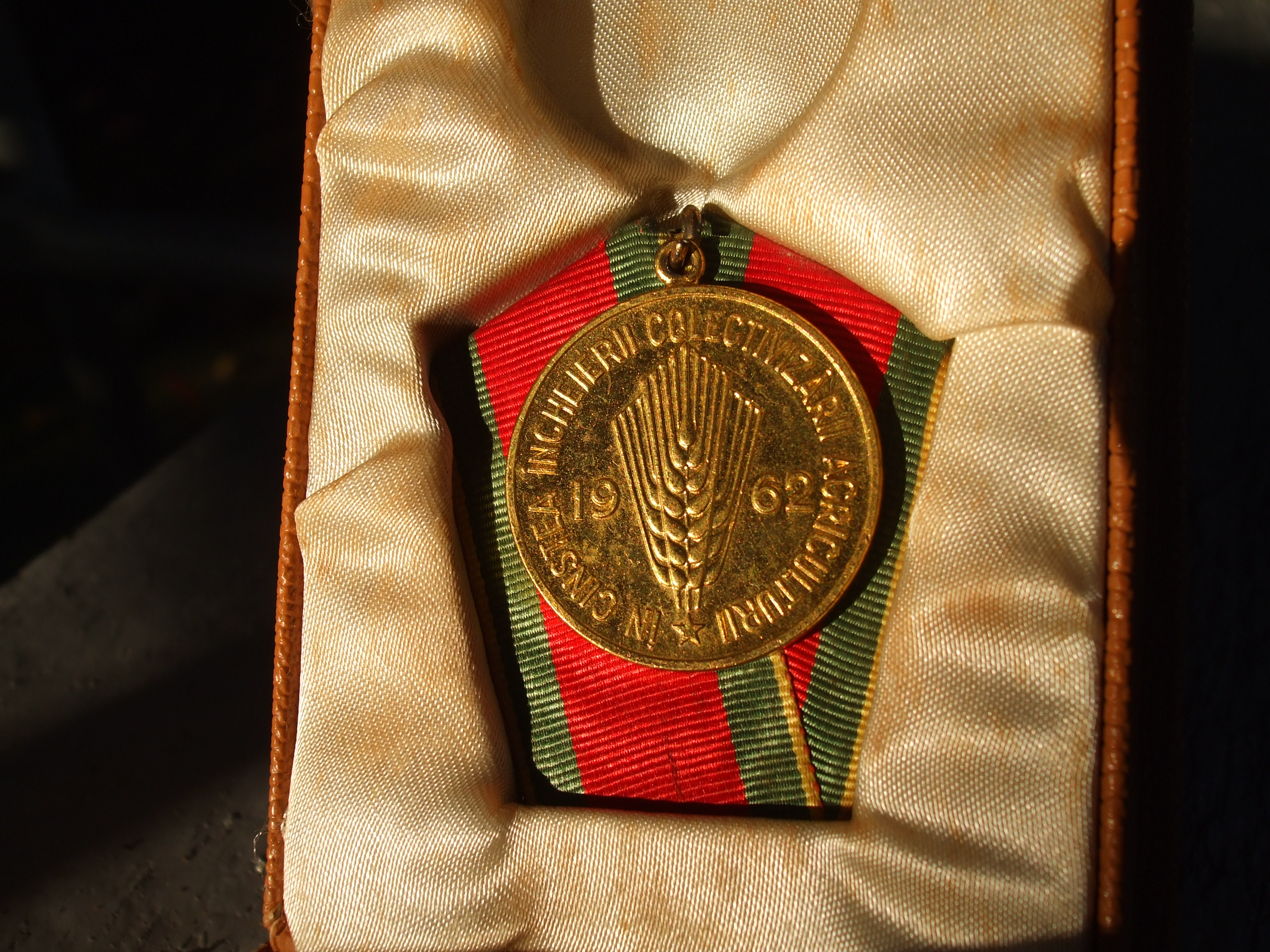
Medal granted in 1962 at the completion of collectivization in Romania

The collectivization of agriculture in Romania took place in the early years of the Communist regime. The initiative sought to bring about a thorough transformation in the property regime and organization of labor in agriculture. According to some authors, such as US anthropologist David Kideckel, agricultural collectivization was a "response to the objective circumstances" in postwar Romania, rather than an ideologically motivated enterprise. Unlike the Stalinist model applied in the Soviet Union in the 1930s, the collectivization was not achieved by mass liquidation of wealthy peasants, starvation, or agricultural sabotage, but was accomplished gradually. This often included significant violence and destruction as employed by cadres, or Party representatives.

The program was launched at the plenary of the Central Committee of the Romanian Workers' Party of 3–5 March 1949, where a resolution regarding socialist transformation of agriculture was adopted along the lines of the Soviet kolkhoz. The collectivization strategy covered two directions: model collective structures were set up, such as Gospodării Agricole Colective (GAC; Collective Agricultural Institutions) and Gospodării Agricole de Stat (GAS; State Agricultural Institutions), aimed at attracting peasants; and the full propaganda system (newspapers, radio, mobile caravans, brochures, direct action by agitators) was put in motion in order to convince peasants to form collective farming units. A problem that the Party encountered with written propaganda was the high rate of illiteracy amongst the Romanian peasantry. In order to combat this, the Party engaged in a campaign to increase literacy amongst the peasants.

The communist ideology clashed with the traditional hierarchical structures of the Romanian villages, which were not egalitarian. Many of the village elites were godparents or patrons for poor peasants, providing them access to land in return for their labor. Many in the lower classes aspired to join the educated elite, and prosperity was seen as a sign of virtue and hard work.

== Prelude ==
Although peasants had received land through the March 1945 reform instituted by the Petru Groza government, they felt increasingly economically constrained with the introduction of compulsory quotas in February 1946. As the government lobbied to gather as much wheat as possible from the villagers, some of them began to revolt; they were also frightened by rumors of collectivization. In January 1947, in the town of Piatra-Olt (then in Romanați County), several hundred inhabitants opposed collection measures and attacked members of the local commission, while in January 1948, in the village of Fumureni in Vâlcea County, some 50 peasants armed with clubs protested the requisitioning of corn.

== Beginning ==
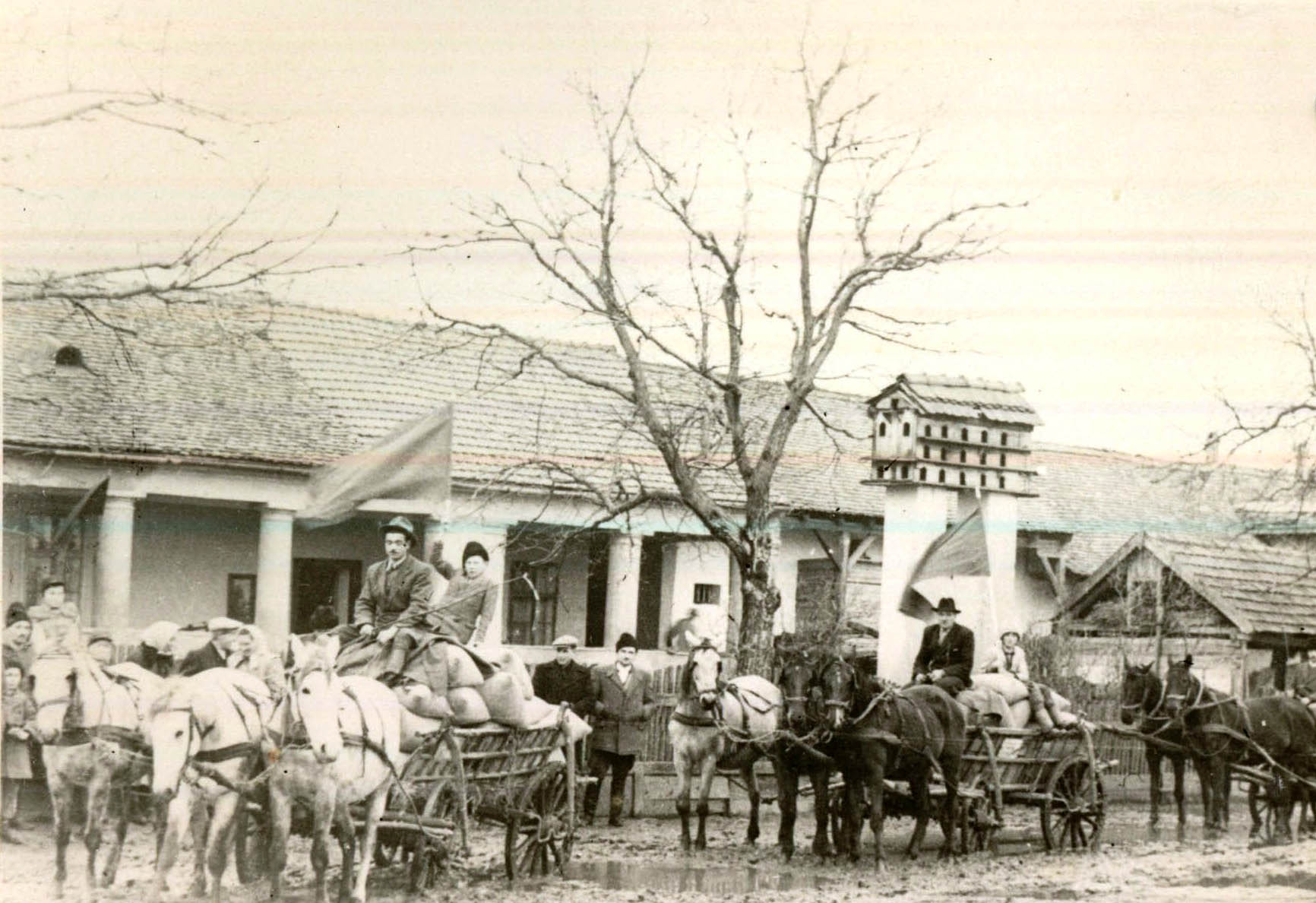
Collective farmers from the "November 7" farm, Bihor County, taking home their share of the crop in 1952.

The initial collectivization drive was accompanied by an intensification of the class struggle in the villages through the elimination of wealthy peasants (chiaburi, also referred to by the Russian term kulaks), whose members were intimidated, beaten, arrested and imprisoned on the grounds that they had employed the labour of poor peasants to work their land. On the grassroots level, the Soviets used cadres, members of the proletarian and peasant class who were to promote communism among the public.

The one-party state used various tactics to convince peasants of the benefits of collectivization, including propaganda such as films and operas, denunciations of suspected class enemies and saboteurs and encouraging peasants to write petitions to inculcate them in socialist norms. "Persuasion work" (muncă de lămurire) was initially a major force for collectivizing the countryside, but those efforts were hapless because of the small size of the agitation workers cadre and its lack of knowledge on agricultural issues. In Romania, where anti-Russian and anti-collectivization sentiments were widespread among the peasantry, it was the persuasion work of cadres that was supposed to "inform" peasants on the reality of the collective farms, in this way disseminating the class line on collectivization throughout the countryside. When they went into the peasant villages to do this, however, many party workers could not even explain adequately what the terms "collective farm" and "stratification" meant, which further raised skepticism among large numbers of farmers.

When persuasion failed to convince peasants, which occurred most often, violent means were also used against poor or "mid-level" peasants and in general against all those who refused to sign up willingly for tillage associations (întovărășiri) or to join the collective. Much attention was devoted to involving members of the rural elite (teachers, priests, well-off peasants), who often had to choose between GAC and prison under an accusation of sabotage. More generally, the recruitment effort sought to involve people whom peasants were most likely to trust. Peasants entered a GAC with not only their land but also their buildings (barns, villas, warehouses), farm vehicles and tools, carts and working animals. Collectivization was accompanied by peasant revolts that broke out when brutal "arguments" were employed as a means of persuasion by the party and by the abusive measures such as obligatory quotas taking away part of the production of individual plots; GAC that had already been set up were excused from such requirements.

A warning against the use of violent means in the process of collectivization was issued by the communist leader Gheorghe Gheorghiu-Dej in 1951. Moreover, after the marginalisation of Ana Pauker and Vasile Luca, he accused the two of instigating provocative measures and "trampling on the free consent by the peasants" during the process. In 1961, the Romanian leader also condemned the large number of public trials against peasants "in the name of the struggle against Kulaks" during the first phase of collectivization.

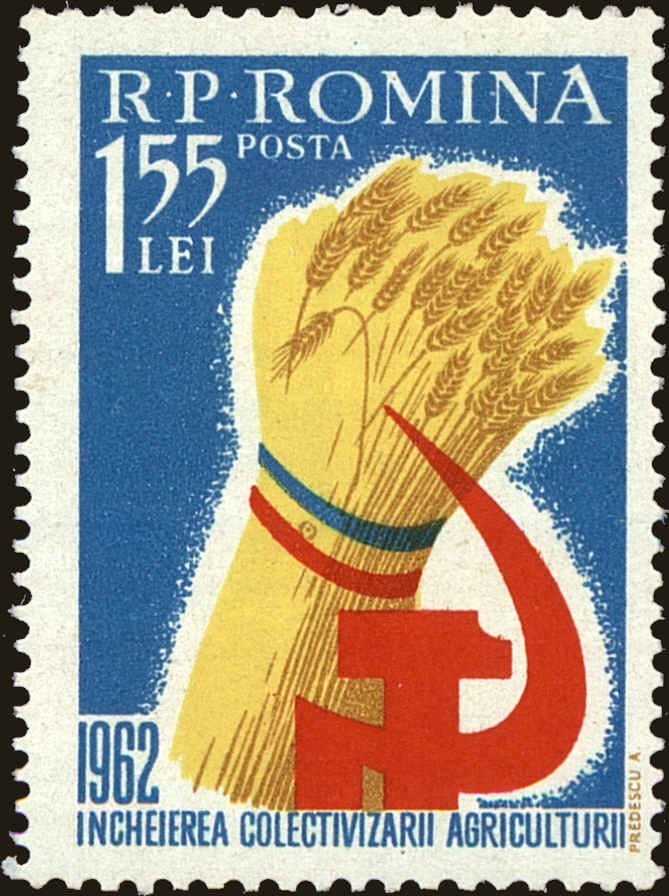
Stamp published in 1962 announcing "the conclusion of the collectivization of agriculture"

Despite those warnings, party cadres were employed and trained on strategies to recruit support for collectivization. Those individuals were chosen among the normal peasant population. Upon completion of their training, they would travel the country and speak to peasant farmers about the party and its efforts at collectivization. That usually included efforts to persuade the peasants to agree to collectivization and to the party's goals. Because that work was extremely difficult and tiring, it was often ineffective. In addition, many cadres did not themselves believe in the cause they were soliciting support for. Moreover, the work of the cadres often turned violent, with systems of terror employed to coerce peasants to agree.

The progress was slow at first, as Romania lagged behind all Soviet Bloc countries in 1952. In 1957, however, the party decided to accelerate the process, which was attributed by Ken Jowitt to the leadership's desire to prove its independence from the Soviet Union. (The Soviet leader at the time, Nikita Khrushchev, opposed the program.) At an extraordinary session of the Great National Assembly held between 27 and 30 April 1962, First Secretary Gheorghiu-Dej announced the end of the collectivization programme; 96% of the country's arable surface and 93.4% of its agricultural land had been included in collective structures. At the same session, he criticized the "Muscovite faction" of the Workers' Party.

Collectivization seriously harmed the Romanian village, according to the Romanian historian Stan Stoica: he cites the loss of "independence, dignity and identity" by the peasants; a decline in the rural population that accelerated when young people migrated to the cities (forced industrialization was going on at the same time); and the fact that families were "wrecked" by poverty while interest in work plummeted.

== Repression ==
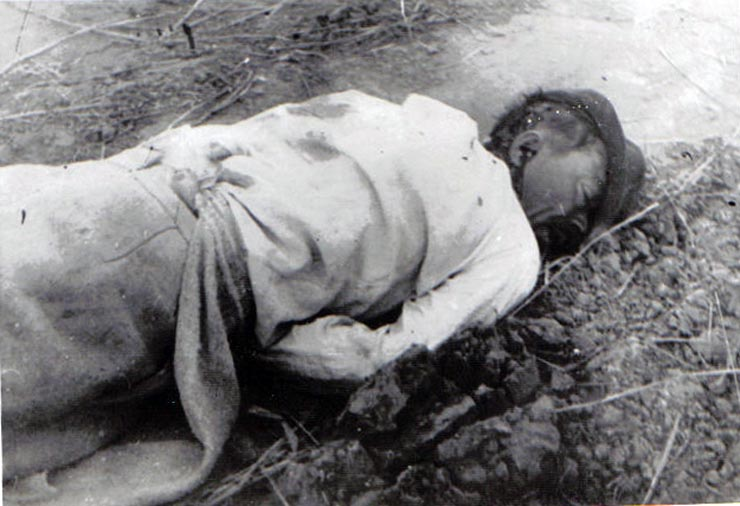
The repression of collectivization opponents was extremely violent. Dumitru Petruț, a peasant from Bihor County, was summarily executed.

Miliția and Securitate troops quelled the revolts, whose leaders were arrested and harshly punished. According to data supplied by the communist authorities, 50,000 peasants were arrested and imprisoned, many of them being tried publicly and sentenced to long prison terms.

From December 1957 to January 1958, the peasants from Suraia, Vadu Roșca, and Răstoaca (now in Vrancea County) resisted the collectivization drive. At one time, several dozen men from Răstoaca attacked a convoy of Romanian Communist Party members; the convoy, which included Nicolae Ceaușescu, had come to convince the locals to join the collectivization effort.

The bloodiest repression of a series of peasant revolts against collectivization in Romania took place in Vadu Roșca. Nine peasants from the area were shot dead, and 17 were wounded; 73 were tried and sentenced to long prison terms. The memorialist Florin Pavlovici witnessed how 30 to 40 men from Răstoaca were sent to the Periprava labor camp in the Danube Delta; according to Andrei Muraru, head of the Institute for the Investigation of Communist Crimes in Romania, it was an extermination camp, with a repressive excessive inhumane regime.

== Progress by region ==
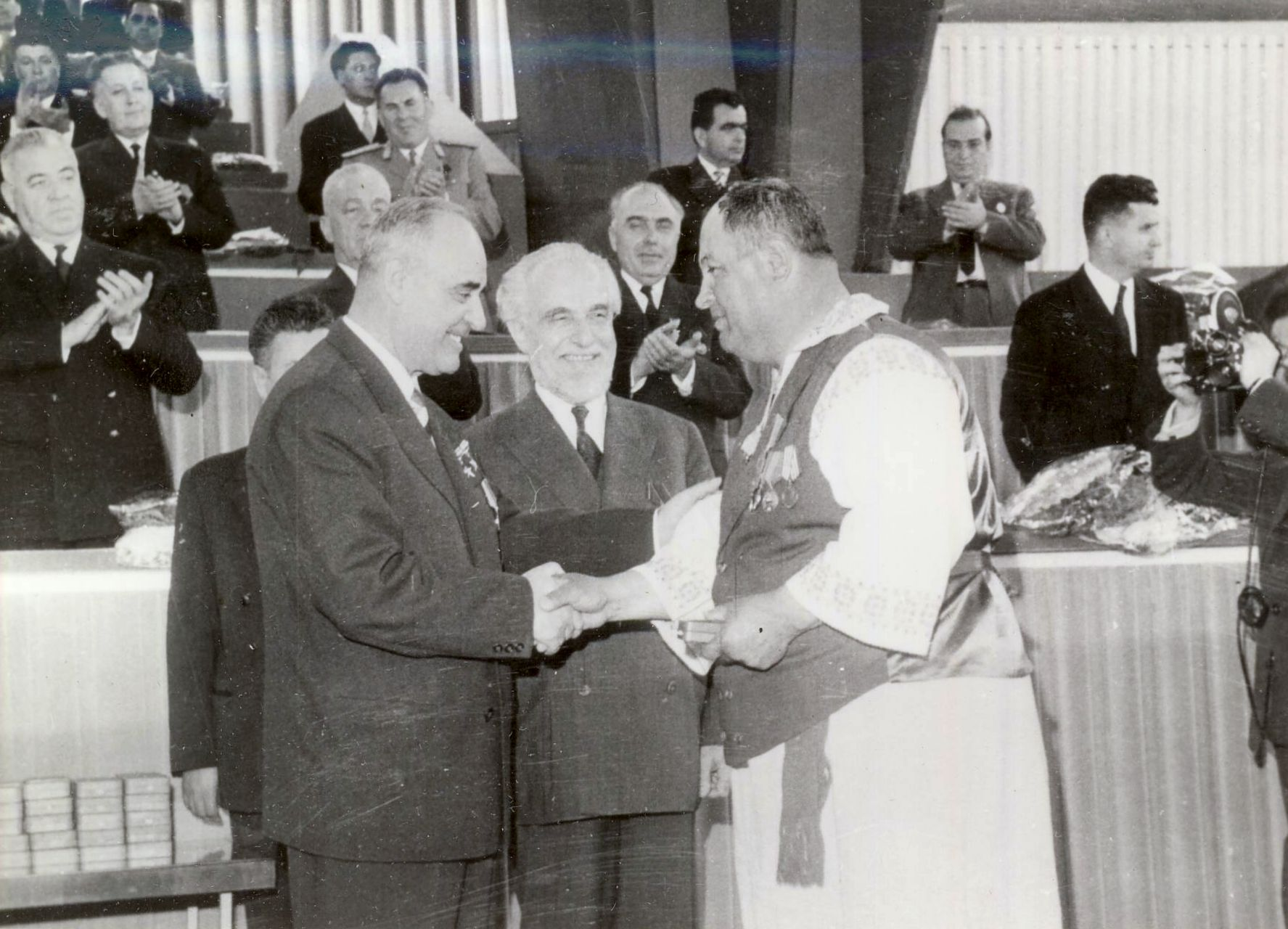
Gheorghe Gheorghiu-Dej and Ștefan Voitec giving medals at a March 1962 Romanian Workers' Party meeting that celebrated the completion of collectivization in Romania.

Region	1958	1960	1962
Argeș Region	4.0	35.8	91.1
Bacău Region	3.4	12.3	95.2
Banat Region	42.3	76.4	89.2
Brașov Region	22.3	38.0	94.3
București Region	16.0	94.5	99.9
Cluj Region	8.0	36.8	86.7
Crișana Region	8.4	28.9	88.5
Dobrogea Region	89.6	96.9	99.6
Galați Region	51.5	72.2	97.3
Hunedoara Region	6.5	32.7	73.6
Iași Region	8.3	38.3	99.6
Maramureș Region	9.4	34.6	86.9
Mureș Hungarian Autonomous Region	11.5	33.1	92.6
Oltenia Region	6.6	32.7	94.0
Ploiești Region	6.6	18.9	94.1
Suceava Region	3.1	13.7	96.3
Total	20.0	50.3	93.9

== See also ==
- Arise Gheorghe, Arise Ioan!
- Eastern Bloc economies
- Economy of the Socialist Republic of Romania
