= Nicolae Pleșiță =

Romanian intelligence official (1929–2009)

Head of Foreign Intelligence Service, Securitate
- In office April 22, 1980 – November 26, 1984
- President: Nicolae Ceaușescu
- Preceded by: Ion Mihai Pacepa

Personal details
- Born: April 26, 1929 Curtea de Argeș, Kingdom of Romania
- Died: September 28, 2009 (aged 80) Bucharest, Romania
- Party: Romanian Communist Party

Nicolae Pleșiță (Romanian pronunciation: [nikoˈla.e ˈpleʃit͡sə]; April 26, 1929 – September 28, 2009) was a Romanian intelligence official and secret police investigator. From 1980 to 1984, he led the Foreign Intelligence Service of the Securitate, the secret service of Communist Romania. He was described by the New York Times and Associated Press at the time of his death as "a die-hard Communist and ruthless chief of the Securitate secret police."

A participant in various actions taken against armed or peaceful anti-communist groups, Pleșiță began his career as a Romanian Communist Party cadre, and rose through the ranks of the Securitate while holding various political offices in the Interior Ministry. Personally involved in the brutal interrogation of dissidents such as Paul Goma, and allegedly the person masterminding several attacks on the Romanian diaspora, he is most remembered for his connections with the Venezuelan terrorist Carlos the Jackal. He arranged for Carlos to be sheltered in Romania after the bombing of Radio Free Europe and was accused, but eventually found innocent in a Romanian court, of complicity in the bombing. After the successful 1989 Revolution, Pleșiță was also noted for openly admitting his various involvements in acts of violence, and for claiming that they were justified by circumstance.

== Biography ==
=== Early years and activities against the armed resistance ===
Pleșiță was born in Curtea de Argeș, a town in Argeș County, southern Romania. According to Gheorghe Florescu, a black marketer of coffee and memoirist who met Pleșiță during communism, the future general had exceptionally lowly origins, being "the son of a farm hand with a two primary classes education and an illiterate peasant woman, who hailed from a family of outlaws in Târgoviște area." A worker at the Moroieni Lumber Factory in his native city and head of the industry's trade union by the age of 18, he joined the Communist Party in 1947, the year when the communist regime was set up, and became active in party affairs.

In 1948, Pleșiță was transferred to the Argeș County directorate of the Union of Communist Youth, and came to the attention of recruiters for the new Securitate secret police. He joined the organisation in 1948 and worked his way through the ranks during the 1950s: instantly promoted to the rank of Plutonier (Warrant Officer) active with the Securitate branch in Piteşti, he rose to high political office after 1951–1953, when he became Head of the Securitate Service in, successively, Regiunea Arad, Regiunea Vîlcea and Regiunea Argeș. He was afterward assigned to the national capital Bucharest, where he was himself a Securitate recruiter directly assigned to the Cadre Commission of the Interior Ministry, before returning to Piteşti in 1956 and taking over as temporary regional head of the Securitate.

In 1958, Pleșiță earned communist distinction for his work in eradicating anti-communist resistance in the Carpathian regions of Transylvania. The honours he received included the Star of the People's Republic of Romania Order and the rank of colonel. In parallel, having attended night school classes in Marxism-Leninism (which the regime had declared equivalent to university-level studies), he completed a one-year course in the Soviet Union. From 1961 to 1967, he was directly assigned to the Transylvanian city of Cluj, becoming head of the secret police apparatus in Regiunea Cluj. A deputy member of the regional Communist Party committee, he graduated from the History Department of the University of Cluj (Babeș-Bolyai) in 1968.

=== Participation in repressions of the 1970s ===
After the Cluj interval, he was again transferred to Bucharest as the head of the directorate of security guards at the Ministry of the Interior, where he was promoted to the rank of major general. In November 1972, Pleșiță was assigned to the homeland secret police department, as head of its 1st Directorate, also working as head of the Securitate Supply Office in Ilfov County (1972–1973). Having returned to as a deputy for the 1st Directorate, he held high office within the Interior Ministry: Secretary General (1973–1975) and First Deputy to Ministers Teodor Coman and George Homoștean (1975–1978). Nicolae Pleșiță was made lieutenant general by Romanian President Nicolae Ceaușescu in April 1977. According to Gheorghe Florescu's recollections, Pleșiță was also discreetly establishing himself as a presence on the criminal underground, by tolerating or endorsing illicit dealings in commodities. These activities, Florescu claimed, were shared among members of the communist elite, among them his fellow Securitate operative and future rival Ion Mihai Pacepa—while the latter secretly represented a pro-Western line within the intelligence and underworld environment, Pleșiță's dealings were reputedly directed toward Soviet and Middle Eastern connections.

Also in 1977, Pleșiță was involved in the violent inquiry of writer Paul Goma, who had attempted to organize a local dissident movement and was eventually expelled from the country. A participant in the Goma movement, psychiatrist Ion Vianu (noted for exposing the use of involuntary commitment as a political weapon), recounted having met Pleșiță three times before being himself expelled to France: "The first time, upon the start of my dissidence, he shouted at me and looked on the verge of hitting me. The second time, several weeks later, he threatened me with prison telling me that he would lock me up with the 'loons' that they had committed into hospitals to ensure their protection and who, as detainees, would exert their revenge on me. Now, once the powers that be had decided to let me go, he was calm and only resorted to threatening me that, once abroad, I should not start talking, because the arm of the revolution was long and the wrath of the people would follow me." Vianu also recalls having refused to make any such promise, but notes that the interest his case had already generated in France made "Pleșiță and his kind" fear taking more severe action against him.

In August of that year, he was credited with helping to stifle coal miners when unrest from the large-scale miners' strike in the Jiu Valley threatened the Ceauşescu regime's grip on society. The Securitate was accused of brutal repression and torture in its efforts to end the unrest. After Ceauşescu was widely booed and jeered during a five-hour speech to the miners, the Valley was declared a restricted area from August 4, 1977, until January 1, 1978. Large numbers of Securitate and military personnel were deployed to the area. Repression took various forms. Workers were interrogated at the Petroșani Securitate building, where some were beaten over the head and had their fingers bound to doors. At least 600 miners were interrogated; 150 penal dossiers were opened; 50 were forcefully hospitalised in psychiatric wards; 15 were sentenced to correctional labour and actually imprisoned, while a further 300 or more (who were considered dangerous) were internally deported. Almost 4,000 of the striking workers were sacked.

=== Head of Foreign Intelligence and cooperation with Carlos ===
After 1978, Pleșiță was commander of the Interior Ministry commissioned officers' school in Băneasa, while serving as member of the core Communist Party cell for its Ministry branch. From 1980 to 1984, after his predecessor Ion Mihai Pacepa had defected to the United States, Pleșiță was the head of the Securitate's Foreign Intelligence Service. In tandem, he served as First Deputy Interior Minister to Homoştean in several new Romanian cabinets, and rose to the position of substitute member of the Communist Party Central Committee.

In 1981, the Securitate hired Carlos the Jackal to assassinate Romanian dissidents living in western Europe and to bomb the offices of Radio Free Europe (RFE), a Munich radio station that broadcast into Romania and other parts of the Eastern Bloc. Eight or nine persons were injured in the RFE bombing. Press reports indicated that Pleșiță brought Carlos to Romania to organize the RFE bombing and gave him plastic explosives, fake documents and videotapes, pictures and sketches of the RFE headquarters. Such accounts further reported that Pleșiță rewarded Carlos with $400,000 deposited in an account at the Romanian Bank for Foreign Trade under the name of Carlos's lover and partner. Reportedly, Pleșiță ordered the RFE bombing and hired Carlos to murder Romanian dissidents in exile and also to assassinate his predecessor Pacepa.

In November 1984, Pleșiță was deposed and appointed commander of the Grădiștea teacher training school for the Ministry of the Interior. Following the overthrow of Ceaușescu in the December 1989 Revolution, Pleșiță, who was passed into reserve with the rank of lieutenant general (1990), was indicted for complicity in the RFE bombing. German requests for extradition of Pleșiță were not granted, and he was tried instead by a Romanian military court. It also investigated the former Securitate general on charges of first-degree murder, assault, false imprisonment, kidnapping and several counts of perjury. During the procedures, Pleșiță testified that he had been assigned by Ceaușescu to contact and cooperate with Carlos. He went on record stating that he found Carlos a "sympathetic" figure and the charges "idiocies", while declining legal counsel. According to his own testimony: "This does not mean that, during the 42 years I've spent in the world of espionage, I was either a saint or a pillar of the church."

Pleșiță thus stated that he had personally masterminded the killing of dissidents: "I killed them, of course. That's what we did". In his account, the Securitate included an entire Lichidări ("Liquidations") service, which he had personally reorganised and assigned to Colonel Sergiu Nica. He also claimed: "the mission of those under [Nica's] orders was to liquidate those sentenced to death by final court decisions and who had fled the country. Only the soldiers who had files kept on them as traitors of the country were ever pursued and executed." He also admitted that Ceaușescu had contemplated the use of Carlos's services against Pacepa, but concluded that the Venezuelan had ultimately been excluded from this scenario. In a 2008 documentary film produced by Alexandru Solomon, Carlos himself recalled having met and grown fond of Pleșiță, and indicated having received two Soviet-made rifles as presents from his Romanian connection. In later statements, Pleșiță came to allege that Yasser Arafat, leader of the Palestine Liberation Organization and former collaborator of Carlos, was a homosexual, and physically attracted to (or even involved in a sexual relationship with) the Venezuelan terrorist.

In 2000, the military court conducting the investigation of Pleșiță's role in the bombing stopped the investigation. In accordance with Romanian legal requirements, according to which civilians could only face civilian courts, the case was reassigned to regular prosecutors in 2004. In the spring of 2009, after 19 years of investigation, they decided to end the inquiry without a formal indictment, and the tribunal determined that Pleșiță was not guilty of complicity in the bombing. Prosecutor Dan Voinea, who had previously worked on the case, criticized the decision, noting that the evidence against Pleșiță was compelling, and that the decision to involve a civilian jurisdiction only became relevant after the dossier collaterally implicated former Securitate head Tudor Postelnicu, who held no military rank.

In parallel, the CNSAS government agency (tasked with exposing secret Securitate files), officially attested that Pleșiță had been involved in political policing of the Romanian population, but its power to render such verdicts was being contested by other court decisions. In 2007, the Institute for the Investigation of Communist Crimes presented a formal complaint against the general, accusing him of terrorism over the Munich bombing. Radio Free Europe's Șerban Orăscu, who joined the Institute in this gesture, suspected an attempt on the part of post-communist authorities to hide Pleșiță's involvement, arguing that several pages had been purposefully removed from his own Securitate file (which he had recovered from the CNSAS). Journalist Andreea Pora, who connects the procedural delays with the alleged unwillingness of Social Democratic politicians to investigate communist crimes, also notes that the decision not to indict Pleșiță closely followed a similar resolution in the case of Ion Iliescu, Social Democratic leader and first post-communist President, who was a subject of an inquiry about his participation in the Romanian Revolution. Pora also alleged that the civilian prosecutors were more likely to answer political commands than their military predecessors.

=== Later claims and final years ===
After the Revolution, Pleșiță continued to receive one of the largest pensions of any former government official in Romania and lived in a villa that was a gift from Ceaușescu. Press reports noted that he was receiving some 6,000 lei (around 2,000 Euros) or over per month. He withdrew to the outskirts of Curtea de Argeș, where he lived in the same house as his son, and was said to have been frequently visited by another suspected Securitate torturer, Gheorghe Enoiu.

In his later years, Pleșiță was often interviewed in the Romanian press and expressed no remorse for his role in crushing anti-communist dissent. This attitude was itself the subject of controversy. Evenimentul Zilei journalist Vlad Stoicescu referred to Pleșiță as "one of the most visible and vocal communist torturers in Romania". Similarly, România Liberă daily referred to Pleșiță as "the perfect example of a Securitate boss, who openly assumed his actions of political policing, and even murders committed by the communists, but who lived a carefree existence in post-1989 Romania." Andreea Pora viewed his stance as clashing with the official condemnation of communism by President Traian Băsescu and the Tismăneanu Commission, noting: "At a time when Traian Băsescu was condemning communism in Parliament [...], Nicolae Pleșiță was laughing on live television broadcasts carried by various stations, casually admitting his crimes, telling us that they were 'mere trifles'." According to Associated Press, this was partly made possible by the political climate of post-1989 Romania, where "many former high-ranking Securitate officers still have key positions in politics and business." At times, his statements defined the Securitate as a body working "for the country's progress", and he personally urged former subordinates to assassinate "traitors who defected to the enemy." He openly told interviewers that he had beaten dissident writer Paul Goma, and recounted that he had been dragging his prisoner around his Securitate cell by his beard. Using agent Matei Pavel Haiducu, the Securitate had later attempted, unsuccessfully, to assassinate Goma while he was in self-exile in France. Suspicion of Pleșiță's personal participation in this move made him the target of a separate investigation opened by Romanian prosecutors in 2007.

Pleșiță's various accounts implicated many other figures in Romania and abroad. Referring to his early activities in Cluj, he claimed first-hand information that poet and communist journalist Anatol E. Baconsky, later known for his dissenting opinions, was an informer of the Securitate (according to literary critic Paul Cernat, the version of events told by "a butcher" matched that of the Securitate's victims within the Sibiu Literary Circle). In the 1990s, former Securitate agents stated that the Soviet KGB had charged the Securitate with "infiltrating France." In his autobiography Red Horizons, Pleșiță's predecessor at the Foreign Intelligence Service, Pacepa, wrote that "Moscow attributed France as a field of action to the Romanian services." In a television interview in 1999, Pleșiță said that Ceauşescu and French Socialist Party leader François Mitterrand had had a "special relationship." Pleșiță also said Ceaușescu had directed at least 250,000 British pounds or $400,000 to Mitterrand's 1981 electoral campaign—which led to the first election of a Socialist President of France. In his retirement, Pleșiță stated that, during his time as head of the Foreign Intelligence Service, the Romanian government had assisted North Korean leader Kim Il Sung to hide a secret transfer of nuclear technology and equipment, to be used in the Asian country's non-civilian nuclear programme. Pleșiță said the transfer took place during a 1984 visit to Bucharest by Kim Il Sung. According to Pleșiță, "When leaving, the presidential train also had aboard the elements necessary for producing the nuclear bomb, which Ceaușescu had sold to his North Korean friend."

Pleșiță died in September 2009 at age 80, after spending three months in a Bucharest sanatorium allegedly run by the Romanian Intelligence Service (SRI). He had suffered from several illnesses, including diabetes, but the cause of death was given as complications from a concussion. During his funeral service, held at the Capu Dealu Romanian Orthodox church in Curtea de Argeș, the SRI, obeying the family's wish, is said to have prevented reporters from witnessing the event. Intelligence Service spokespersons denied that the institution had overseen either Pleșiță's hospitalisation or his funeral.
