= Răstoaca =

- Commune
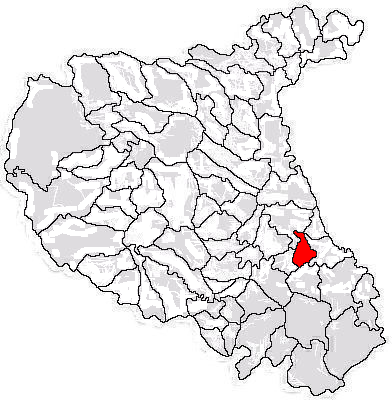
- Location in Vrancea County

- Location in Romania
- Coordinates: 45°40′N 27°17′E
- Country: Romania
- County: Vrancea

Government
  - Mayor (2024–2028): David Chiriță (PNL)
- Area: 20.44 km^{2} (7.89 sq mi)
- Elevation: 31 m (102 ft)
- Population (2021-12-01): 2,059
  - Density: 100/km^{2} (260/sq mi)
- Time zone: EET/EEST (UTC+2/+3)
- Postal code: 627208
- Area code: +(40) 237
- Vehicle reg.: VN
- Website: rastoaca.ro

Răstoaca is a commune located in Vrancea County, Romania. It is composed of a single village, Răstoaca, and was part of Milcovul commune from 1968 until 2004, when it was split off.

The commune is located in the southern part of the county, 12 km (7.5 mi) southeast of the county seat, Focșani.

== History ==
In December 1957–January 1958, during the Communist era, the peasants from Răstoaca and nearby Suraia and Vadu Roșca resisted the collectivization of agriculture. At one time, several dozen men from Răstoaca attacked a convoy of Communist Party members; the convoy, which included Nicolae Ceaușescu, had come to convince the locals to join in the collectivization effort. Several peasants from the area who revolted were shot; 73 were tried and sentenced to long prison terms. Memorialist Florin Pavlovici witnessed how 30–40 men from Răstoaca were sent to the Periprava labor camp in the Danube Delta; according to Andrei Muraru, head of the Institute for the Investigation of Communist Crimes in Romania, this was an extermination camp, with a repressive, excessive, inhuman regime.

Historical population
| Year | Pop. | ±% |
|---|---|---|
| 2002 | 2,210 | — |
| 2011 | 1,811 | −18.1% |
| 2021 | 2,059 | +13.7% |
Source: Census data
