= Suraia =

- Commune
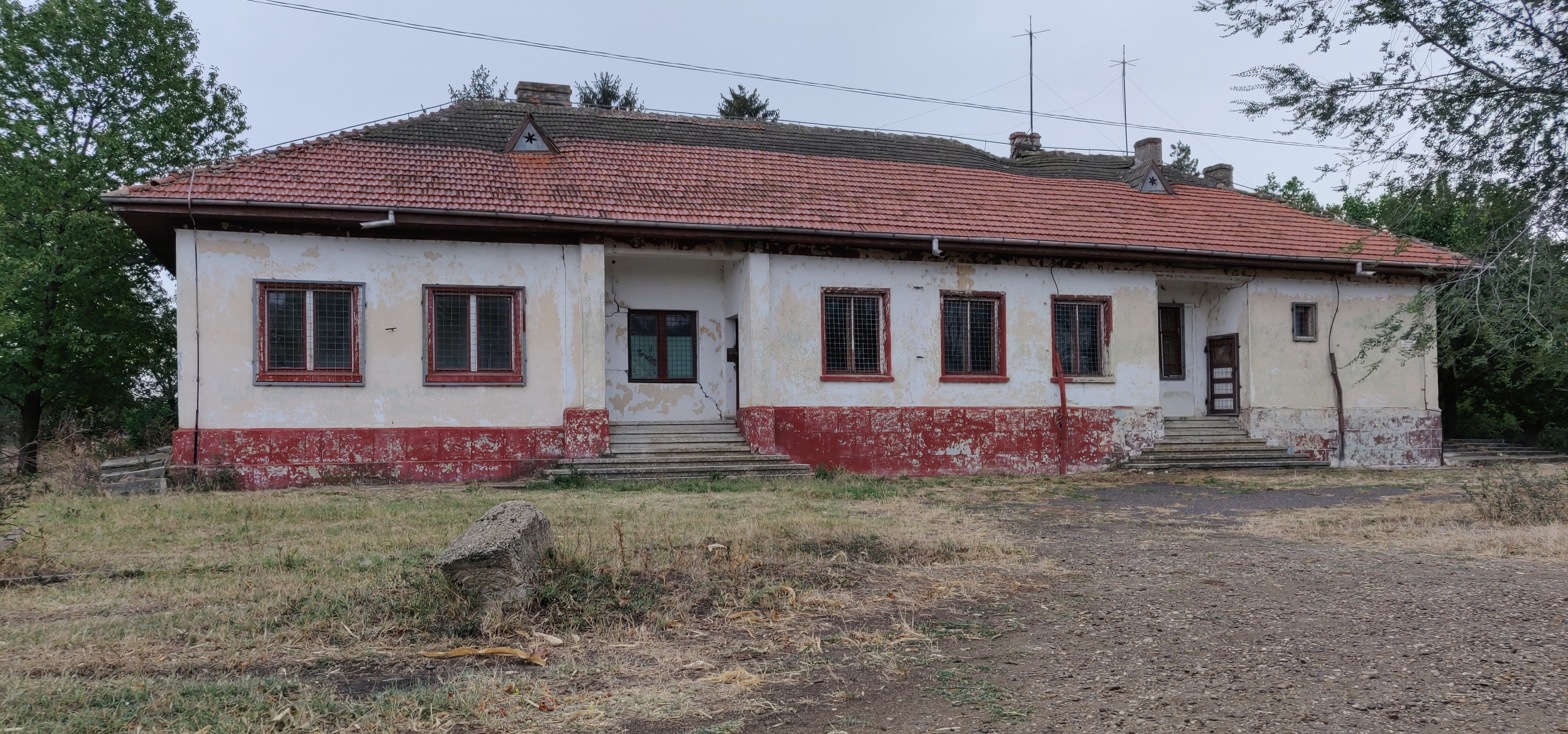
- Suraia train station

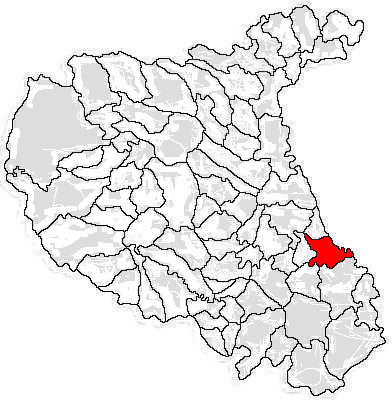
- Location in Vrancea County

- Location in Romania
- Coordinates: 45°41′N 27°23′E
- Country: Romania
- County: Vrancea

Government
  - Mayor (2024–2028): Maria Stroe (PNL)
- Area: 48.51 km^{2} (18.73 sq mi)
- Elevation: 25 m (82 ft)
- Population (2021-12-01): 5,705
  - Density: 117.6/km^{2} (304.6/sq mi)
- Time zone: UTC+02:00 (EET)
  - Summer (DST): UTC+03:00 (EEST)
- Postal code: 627330
- Area code: +(40) 237
- Vehicle reg.: VN
- Website: suraia.primarievn.ro

Suraia is a commune located in Vrancea County, Romania. It is composed of a single village, Suraia. It included the village of Biliești until 2004, when this was split off to form a separate commune.

== Geography ==
The commune is located in the eastern part of the county, on the right bank of the Siret, a river that forms the border with Galați County. Suraia is crossed by county road DJ204D, which connects it to the south to Vulturu (where it ends in DN23) and to the northwest to Biliești, Vânători, and Focșani (where it ends in DN2). The Făurei–Tecuci railway also passes through the commune, which is served by the Suraia stop.

== History ==
At the end of the 19th century, the commune was part of Putna County and was formed by the villages of Butuceni, Dimaciu, Dumbrăvița, and Suraia, with 3,041 inhabitants. In 1950, the commune was assigned to the Focșani raion of Putna Region, then (after 1952) of Bârlad Region and (after 1956) of Galați Region. In 1968, it was transferred to Vrancea County.

In December 1957–January 1958, during the Communist era, the peasants from Suraia and nearby Vadu-Roșca and Răstoaca resisted the collectivization of agriculture. Nine peasants from the area were shot dead, and 17 were wounded; 73 were tried and sentenced to long prison terms.

Historical population
Year	Pop.	±%
2002	5,496	—
2011	4,595	−16.4%
2021	5,705	+24.2%
Source: Census data
