= Regions of the People's Republic of Romania =

The regions of RPR between 1950–1952

Between 1950 and 1968, a Soviet-inspired experiment organised the Romanian People's Republic into various different regions.

== Regions of 1950 ==
The regions of RPR between 1950–1952

- Regiunea Arad (Ar.)
- Regiunea Argeș (Ptș.)
- Regiunea Bacău (Bc.)
- Regiunea Baia Mare (B.Mr.)
- Regiunea Bârlad (Bd.)
- Regiunea Bihor (Ord.)
- Regiunea Botoșani (Bt.)
- Regiunea București (R.B.)
- Regiunea Buzău (Bz.)
- Regiunea Cluj (Clj.)
- Regiunea Constanța (Cța.)
- Regiunea Dolj (Cv.)
- Regiunea Galați (Gl.)
- Regiunea Gorj (Tg.J.)
- Regiunea Hunedoara (Dv.)
- Regiunea Ialomița (Cl.)
- Regiunea Iași (Iș.)
- Regiunea Mureș (Tg.M.)
- Regiunea Prahova (Pl.)
- Regiunea Putna (Fș.)
- Regiunea Rodna (Btr.)
- Regiunea Satu Mare (St.M.)
- Regiunea Severin (Lgș.)
- Regiunea Sibiu (Sb.)
- Regiunea Stalin (O.S.)
- Regiunea Suceava (Sv.)
- Regiunea Teleorman (R.Vd.)
- Regiunea Timișoara (Tmş.)
- Regiunea Vâlcea (Rm.V.)

== Regions of 1952 ==
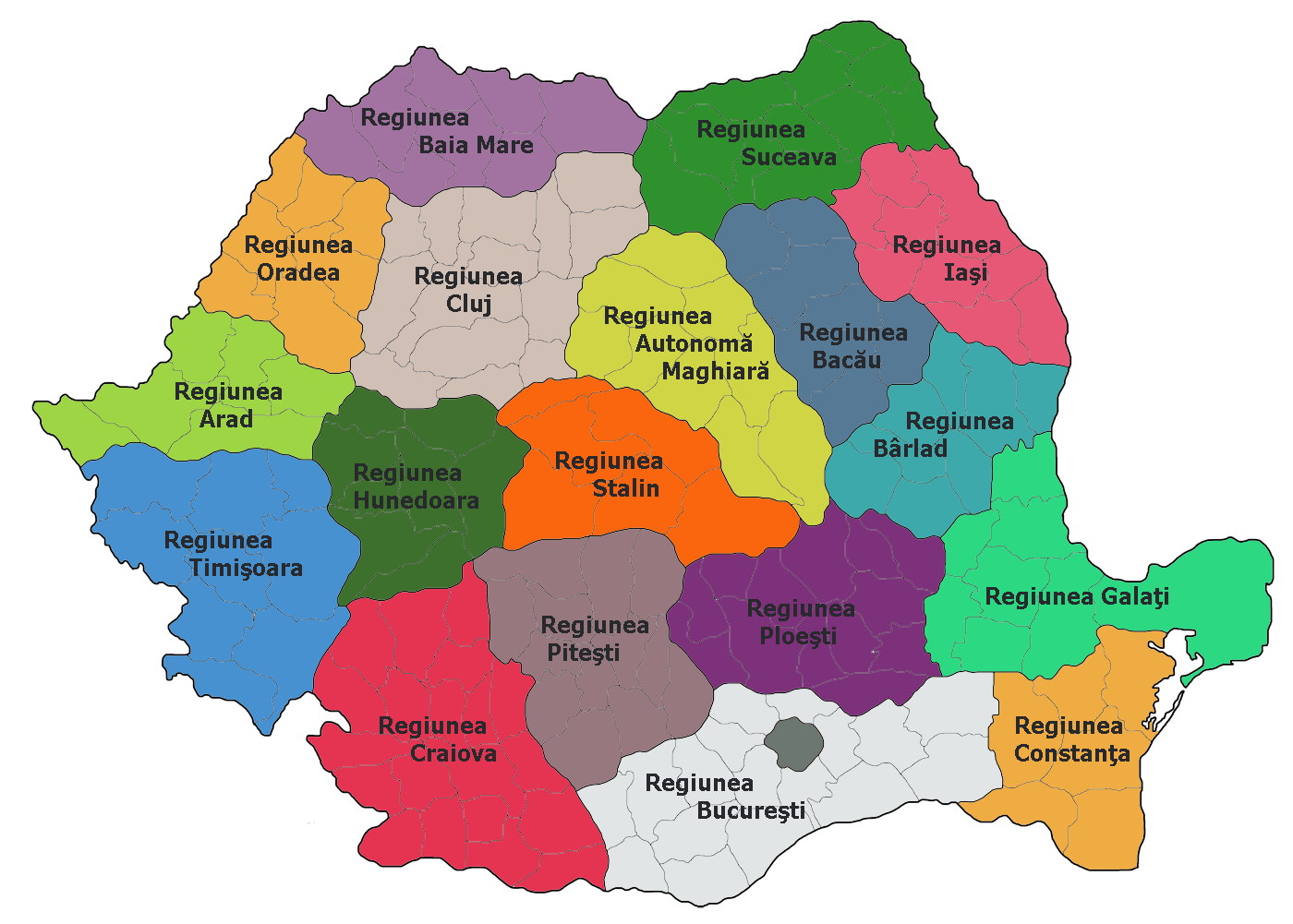
The regions of RPR between 1952–1956

September 19, 1952 – Decree nr.331. By merging, the number of regions was reduced to 18.

- Regiunea Arad (Ar.)
- Regiunea Bacău (Bc.)
- Regiunea Baia Mare (B.Mr.)
- Regiunea Bârlad (Bd.)
- Regiunea București (R.B.) (Bucharest City–B.)
- Regiunea Cluj (Clj.)
- Regiunea Constanța (Cţa.)
- Regiunea Craiova (Cv.)
- Regiunea Galați (Gl.)
- Regiunea Hunedoara (Dv.)
- Regiunea Iași (Iș.)
- Regiunea Autonomă Maghiară (Magyar Autonomous Region) (Tg.M.)
- Regiunea Oradea (Ord.)
- Regiunea Pitești (Ptș.)
- Regiunea Ploiești (Pl.)
- Regiunea Stalin (O.S.)
- Regiunea Suceava (Sv.)
- Regiunea Timișoara (Tmș.)

== Regions of 1956 ==
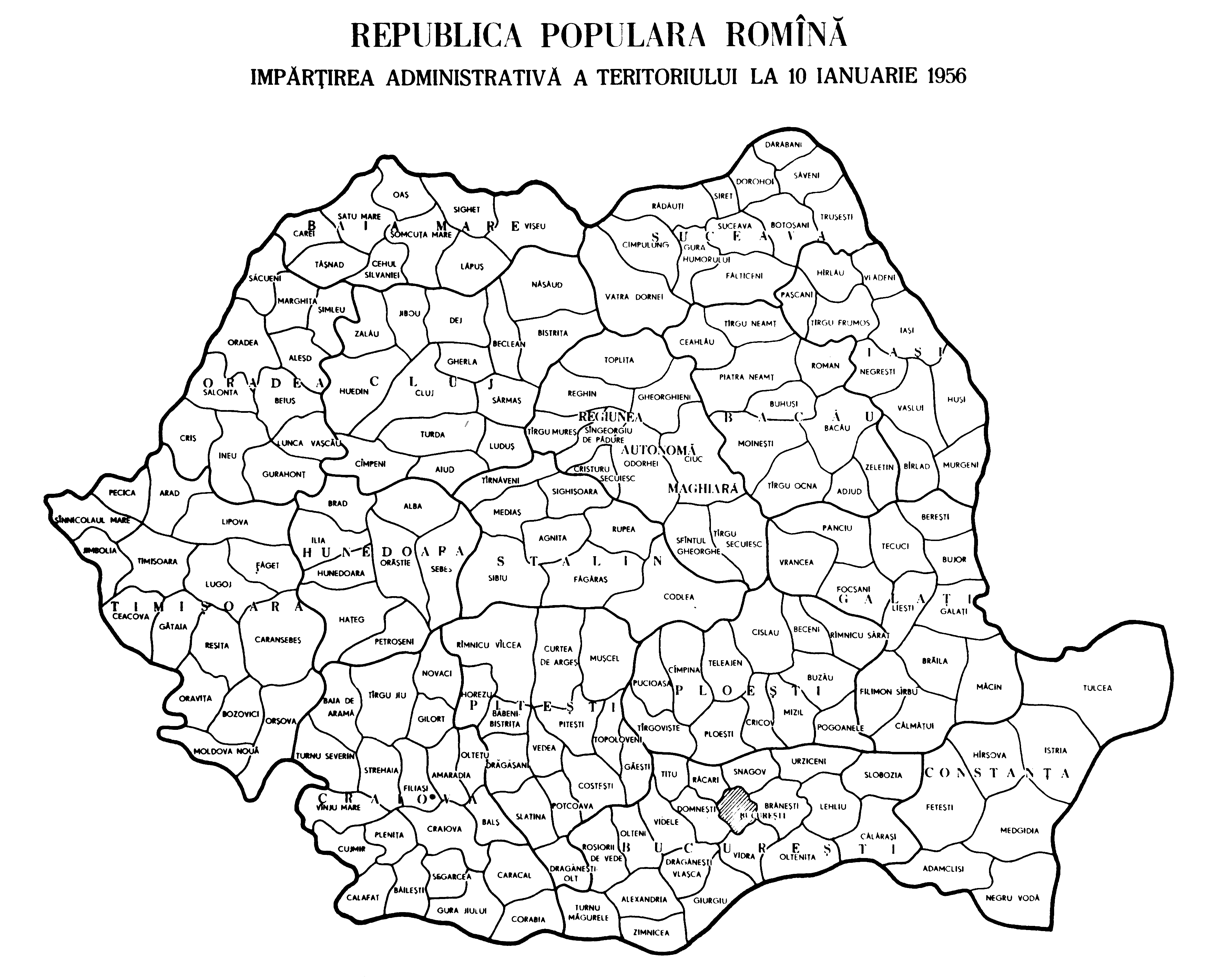
The regions of RPR in 1956

1956 – An intermediary step in which the regions Arad and Bârlad were absorbed by their neighbours.

- Regiunea Argeș (Ptș.)
- Regiunea Bacău (Bc.)
- Regiunea Baia Mare (B. Mr.)
- Regiunea București (B., Bucharest City–O.B.)
- Regiunea Cluj (Clj.)
- Regiunea Constanța (Cta.)
- Regiunea Craiova (Cv.)
- Regiunea Galați (Gl.)
- Regiunea Hunedoara (Dv.)
- Regiunea Iași (Iș.)
- Regiunea Autonomă Maghiară (Magyar Autonomous Region) (Tg.M.)
- Regiunea Oradea (Ord.)
- Regiunea Ploiești (Pl.)
- Regiunea Stalin (Brașov City/Orașul Stalin–O.S.)
- Regiunea Suceava (Sv.)
- Regiunea Timișoara (Tmș.)

== Regions of 1960 ==
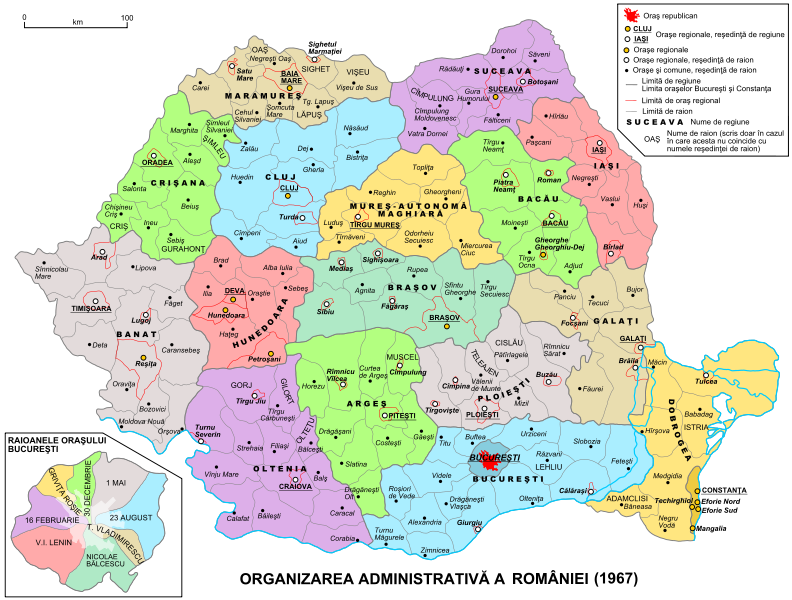
The regions of RPR between 1960–1968

1960 – As of 24 December, the final step, with territory redistribution and some regions renamed. The Magyar administrative entity was renamed Regiunea Mureș-Autonomă Maghiară (Mureș Region – Magyar Autonomous), also modifying its territory. By the end, the number of regions was reduced to 16.

- Regiunea Argeș (AG)
- Regiunea Bacău (BC)
- Regiunea Banat (BT)
- Regiunea Brașov (BV; very briefly Br. after the name reverted to Brașov)
- Regiunea București (B, including Bucharest City)
- Regiunea Cluj (CJ)
- Regiunea Crișana (CR)
- Regiunea Dobrogea (DB)
- Regiunea Galați (GL)
- Regiunea Hunedoara (HD)
- Regiunea Iași (IS)
- Regiunea Maramureș (MR)
- Regiunea Mureș-Autonomă Maghiară (Mureș Region-Magyar Autonomous) (MS)
- Regiunea Oltenia (OL)
- Regiunea Ploiești (PL)
- Regiunea Suceava (SV)

== See also ==
- Administrative divisions of the People's Republic of Romania
- Former administrative divisions of Romania
