= Biliești =

- Commune
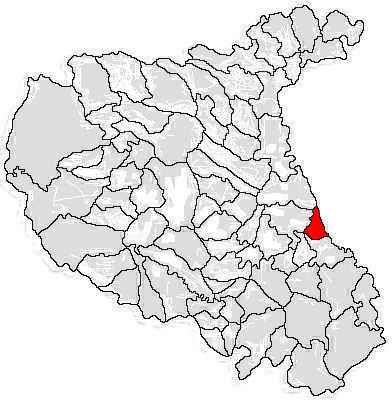
- Location in Vrancea County

- Location in Romania
- Coordinates: 45°44′N 27°20′E
- Country: Romania
- County: Vrancea

Government
  - Mayor (2024–2028): Vasile Chirilă (PNL)
- Area: 17 km^{2} (7 sq mi)
- Elevation: 31 m (102 ft)
- Population (2021-12-01): 2,395
  - Density: 140/km^{2} (360/sq mi)
- Time zone: EET/EEST (UTC+2/+3)
- Postal code: 627331
- Area code: +(40) 237
- Vehicle reg.: VN
- Website: www.primariabiliesti.ro

Biliești is a commune located in Vrancea County, Romania. It is composed of a single village, Biliești. It was part of Suraia Commune until 2004, when it was split off to form a separate commune.

Historical population
Year	Pop.	±%
2002	2,309	—
2011	1,833	−20.6%
2021	2,395	+30.7%
Source: Census data
