= Bihor Region =

Administrative division of Romania 1918–1991

Bihor Region within the administrative divisions of Romania, 1950–1952

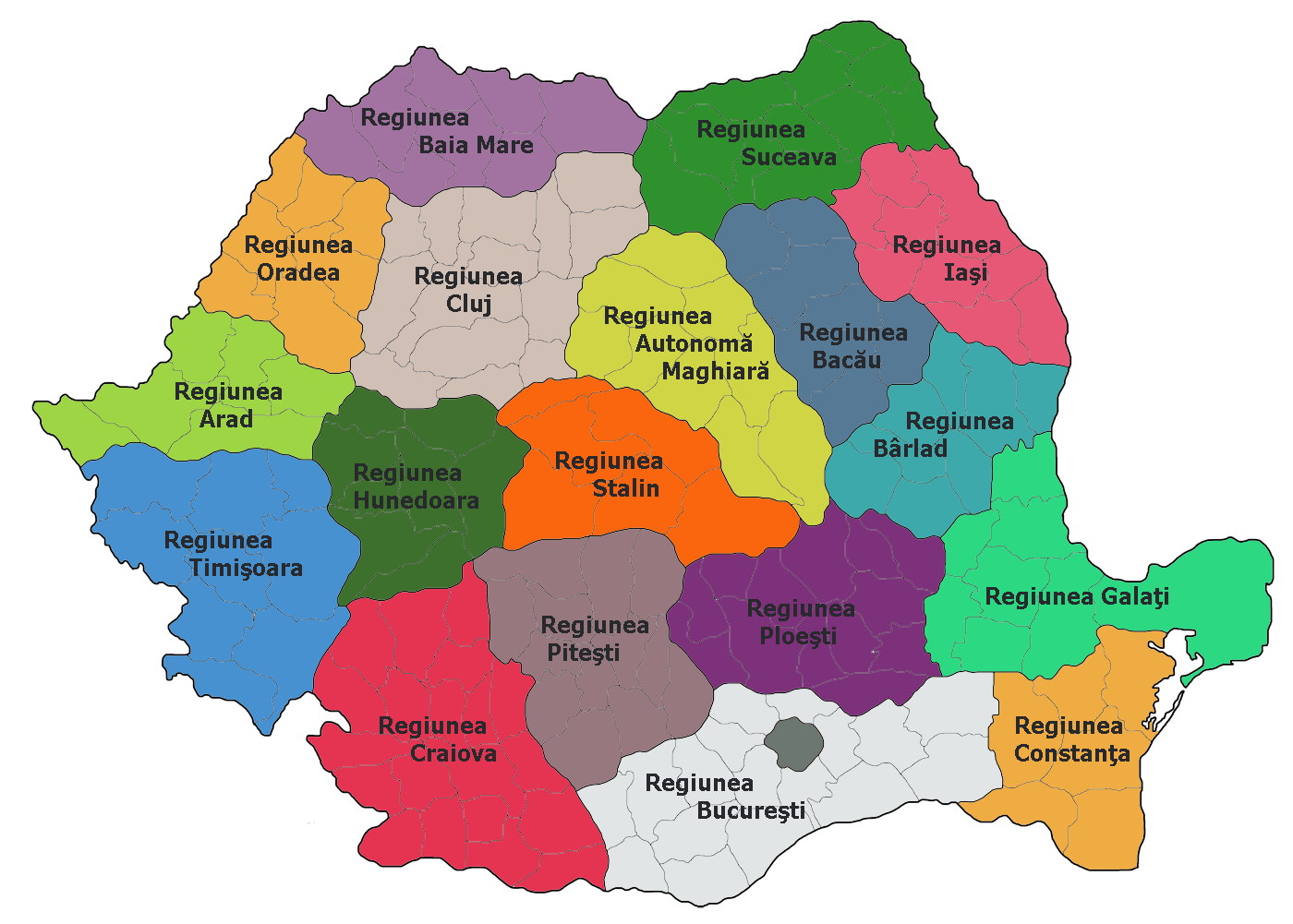
Oradea Region within the administrative divisions of Romania, 1952–1956

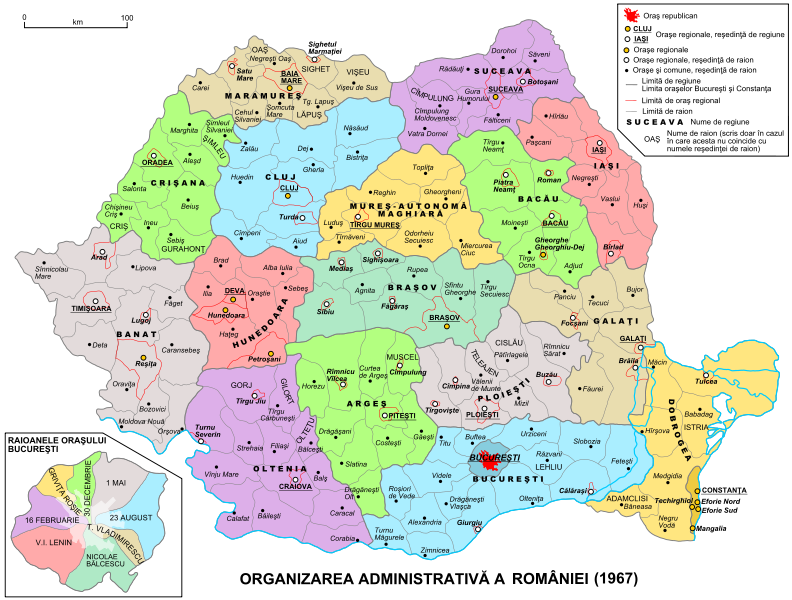
Crișana Region within the administrative divisions of Romania, 1960–1968

Bihor Region (Regiunea Bihor) was one of the newly established (in 1950) administrative divisions of the People's Republic of Romania, copied after the Soviet style of territorial organisation.

== History ==
The capital of the region was Oradea, and its territory comprised an area similar to the nowadays Bihor County. In 1952 its name was changed to Oradea, and in 1956 after the dissolution of Arad Region it assimilated three of its raions: Ineu, Criș, and Gurahonț. In 1960 the region was renamed Crișana.

== Neighbors ==
Bihor Region had as neighbors:

- 1950–1956: East: Cluj Region; South: Arad Region; West: Hungarian People's Republic; North: Baia Mare region.
- 1956–1968: East: Cluj Region; South: Banat and Hunedoara regions; West: Hungarian People's Republic; North: Baia Mare Region.

== Rayons ==
- 1950–1956: Oradea, Săcuieni, Marghita, Șimleu, Aleșd, Salonta, Beiuș.
- 1956–1968: Oradea, Săcuieni, Marghita, Șimleu, Aleșd, Salonta, Beiuș, Criș, Ineu, Gurahonț.
