= Vulturu, Vrancea =

Vulturu
- Commune
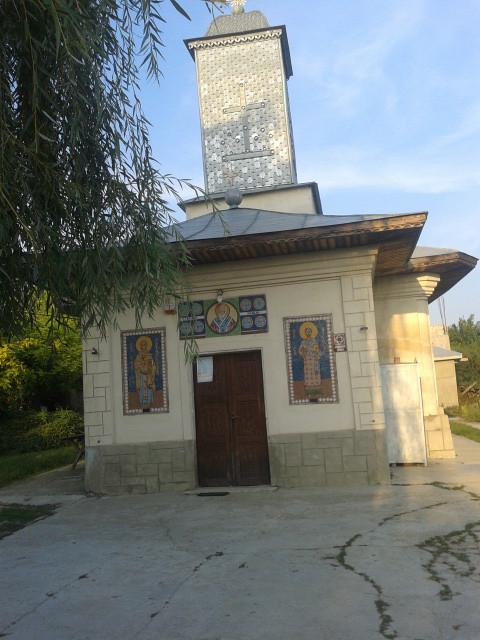
- Church in Maluri

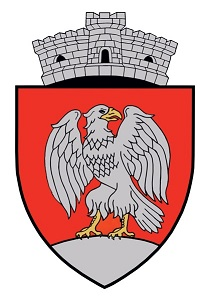
- Coat of arms

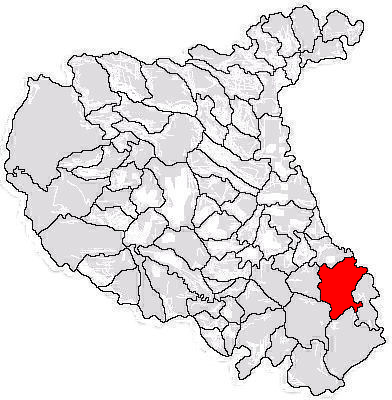
- Location in Vrancea County

- Location in Romania
- Coordinates: 45.6181°N 27.4231°E
- Country: Romania
- County: Vrancea

Government
  - Mayor (2024–2028): Nicușor Păcuraru (PSD)
- Area: 104.33 km^{2} (40.28 sq mi)
- Elevation: 20 m (66 ft)
- Population (2021-12-01): 6,873
  - Density: 65.88/km^{2} (170.6/sq mi)
- Time zone: UTC+02:00 (EET)
  - Summer (DST): UTC+03:00 (EEST)
- Postal code: 627455
- Area code: +(40) 237
- Vehicle reg.: VN
- Website: primariavulturu.ro

Vulturu is a commune located in the southeastern part of Vrancea County, Romania. It is composed of five villages: Boțârlău, Hângulești, Maluri, Vadu-Roșca, and Vulturu.

The commune is located in the southeastern part of the county, on the border with Galați County. It is situated in the extreme northeast of the Wallachian Plain, where the Putna River flows into the Siret River.

== History ==
In December 1957–January 1958, during the Communist era, the peasants from Vadu-Roșca and nearby Suraia and Răstoaca resisted the collectivization of agriculture. The bloodiest repression of a series of peasant revolts against collectivization in Romania took place in Vadu Roșca. Nine peasants from the area were shot dead, and 17 were wounded; 73 were tried and sentenced to long prison terms.

Historical population
Year	Pop.	±%
2002	8,538	—
2011	6,277	−26.5%
2021	6,873	+9.5%
Source: Census data
