= Baia Mare Region =

Administrative division of the People's Republic of Romania

Baia Mare Region within the administrative divisions of Romania, 1950–1952

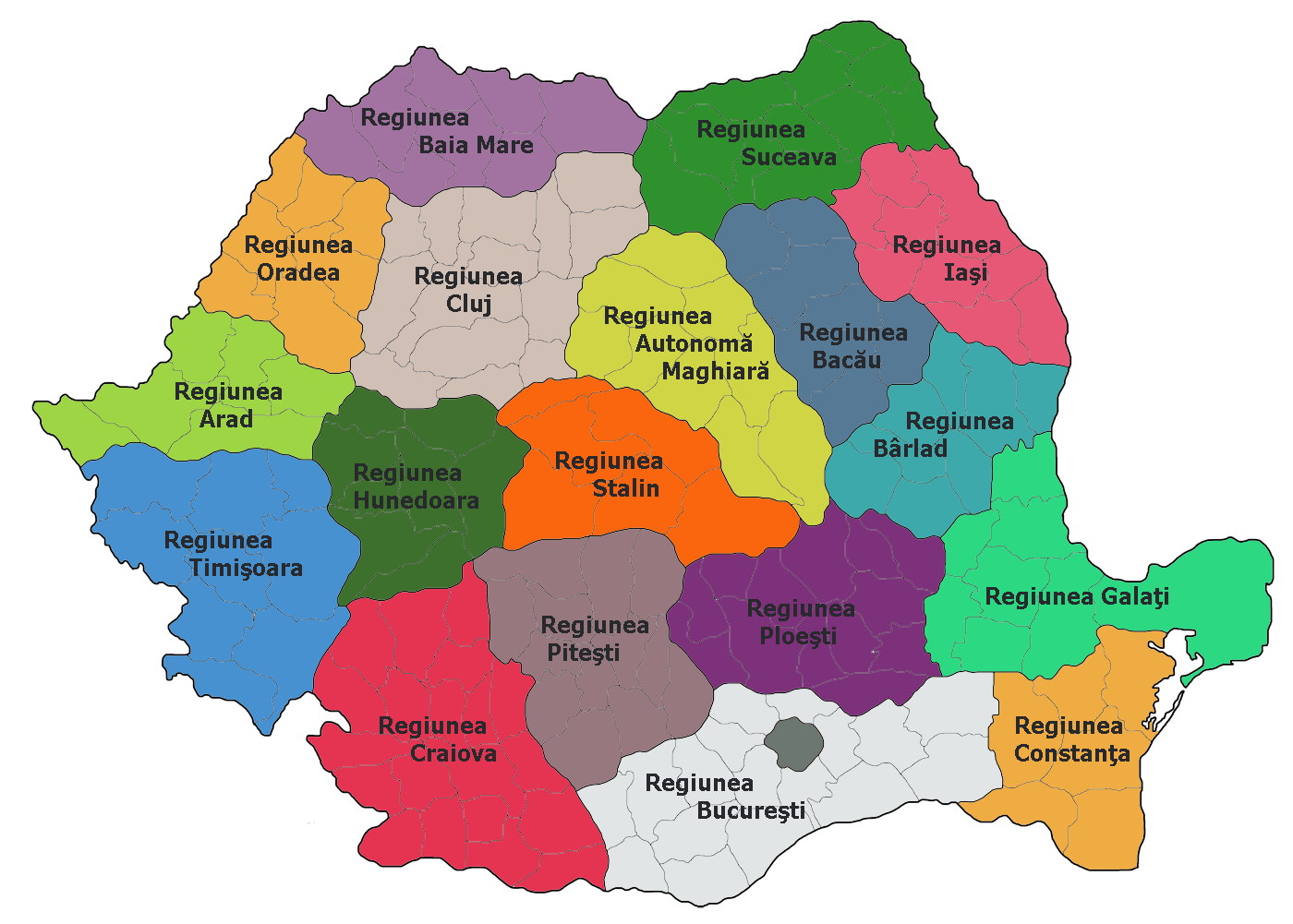
Baia Mare Region within the administrative divisions of Romania, 1952–1956

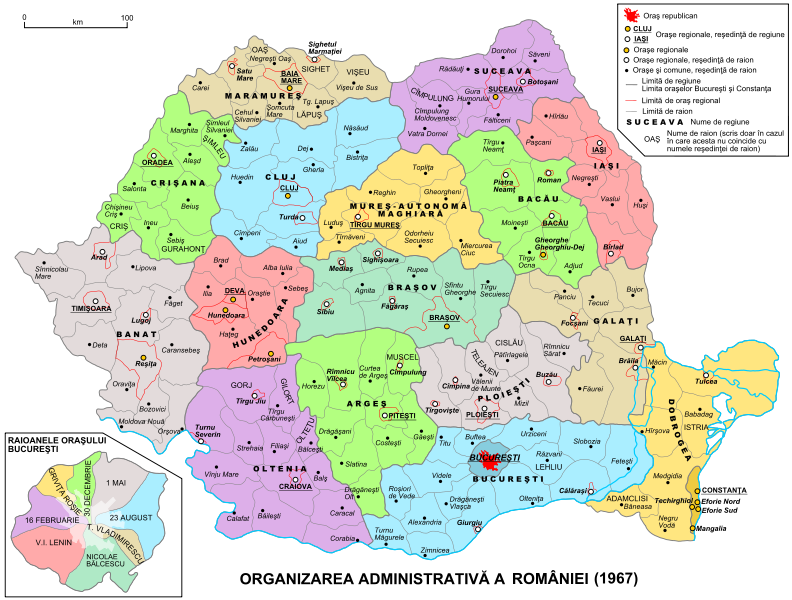
Maramureș Region within the administrative divisions of Romania, 1960–1968

Regiunea Baia Mare (Baia Mare Region) was one of the newly established (in 1950) administrative divisions of the People's Republic of Romania, copied after the Soviet style of territorial organization.

== History ==
The capital of the region was Baia Mare, and its territory comprised an area similar to what are nowadays the Maramureș and Satu Mare counties. In 1952 the raion Vișeu was attached to the Baia Mare Region from the Rodna Region, after the dissolution of the latter. In 1960 the name of the region was changed to Maramureș.

== Neighbors ==
The Baia Mare Region had as neighbors:

- 1950–1952: East: Rodna Region; South: Cluj Region and Bihor Region; West: Hungarian People's Republic; North: Ukrainian Soviet Socialist Republic.
- 1952–1968: East: Suceava Region; South: Cluj Region and Oradea Region; West: Hungarian People's Republic; North: Ukrainian Soviet Socialist Republic.

== Raions ==
- 1950–1952: Baia Mare, Satu Mare, Sighet, Oaș, Carei, Cehu Silvaniei, Lăpuș.
- 1952–1968: Baia Mare, Satu Mare, Sighet, Oaș, Carei, Cehu Silvaniei, Lăpuș, Vișeu.
