= Constanța Region =

Regiunea Constanța (1952–1960) Regiunea Dobrogea (1960–1968)
- Region (Regiune)
- Country: People's Republic of Romania
- Historic region: Dobruja
- Region seat (reședință de regiune): Constanța
- Established: 1950
- Ceased to exist: 1968
- Time zone: UTC+2 (EET)
  - Summer (DST): UTC+3 (EEST)

Regiunea Constanța (Constanța Region) was one of the 1950 new administrative Soviet-style divisions of the People's Republic of Romania.

== History ==
The seat of the region was Constanța, and at first, its territory comprised an area a bit larger than the nowadays Constanța County. In 1952, it included the Fetești raion of the dissolved Ialomița region, that was later (1960) incorporated into the București region. In 1960 it merged with the South-Eastern raions of the Galați region to form Dobrogea region, comprising the area of the nowadays Constanța and Tulcea counties (Northern Dobruja).

== Neighbors ==
Constanța region had as neighbors:

- 1950–1952: East: the Black Sea; South: People's Republic of Bulgaria; West: Ialomița region; North: Galați region;
- 1952–1960: East: the Black Sea; South: People's Republic of Bulgaria; West: București region; North: Galați region;
- 1960–1968: East: the Black Sea; South: People's Republic of Bulgaria; West: București and Galați regions; North: Ukrainian Soviet Socialist Republic.

== Raions ==
- 1950–1952: Constanța, Negru Vodă, Adamclisi, Medgidia, Hârșova, Istria;
- 1952–1960: Constanța, Negru Vodă, Adamclisi, Medgidia, Hârșova, Istria, Fetești;
- 1960–1968: Constanța, Negru Vodă, Adamclisi, Medgidia, Hârșova, Istria, Fetești, Măcin, Tulcea.
