= Buzău Region =

Buzău Region within the administrative divisions of Romania, 1950–1952

Regiunea Buzău (Buzău Region) was one of the newly established (in 1950) administrative divisions of the People's Republic of Romania, copied after the Soviet style of territorial organisation.

== History ==
The capital of the region was Buzău, and its territory comprised an area similar to the nowadays Buzău County. In 1952 it was dissolved by merging with Prahova Region to form Ploiești Region.

== Neighbours ==
Buzău Region had as neighbours:

East: Galați Region; South: Ialomița Region; West: Prahova Region; North: Stalin Region and Putna Region.

== Rayons ==
Buzău, Râmnicu Sărat, Pogoanele, Pătârlagele, Beceni.
