= Alexandru Muraru =

Romanian politician (born 1982)

Member of the Chamber of Deputies
- Incumbent
- Assumed office 27 October 2020
- Preceded by: Costel Alexe
- Constituency: Iași

Personal details
- Born: 20 May 1982 (age 44)
- Party: National Liberal Party
- Relatives: Andrei Muraru (twin brother)

Iulian-Alexandru Muraru (born 20 May 1982) is a Romanian historian and politician of the National Liberal Party serving as a member of the Chamber of Deputies. He first took office in 2020, succeeding Costel Alexe, and was re-elected in the 2020 parliamentary election. He is the twin brother of Andrei Muraru.
