= Botoșani Region =

1950–1952 Romanian region

Botoșani Region within the administrative divisions of Romania, 1950–1952

Botoșani Region (Regiunea Botoșani) was one of the newly established (in 1950) administrative divisions of the Romanian People's Republic, copied after the Soviet-style of territorial organisation. It existed until 1952 when it was merged into Suceava Region.

== History ==
The region was established through Law nr. 5 on September 6, 1950. The capital of the region was Botoșani, and its territory comprised the area of the nowadays Botoșani County. On September 19, 1952 the region was dissolved though Decree nr. 331, and its raions were incorporated into the Suceava Region.

== Neighbors ==
The Moldavian Soviet Socialist Republic lay east, the Iași Region south, the Suceava Region west, and the Ukrainian Soviet Socialist Republic north.

== Raions ==
Botoșani Region consisted of the Botoșani, Darabani, Săveni, Dorohoi, and Trușești raions.
