= Matei Pavel Haiducu =

Matei Pavel Haiducu (May 18, 1948 – August 5, 1998) was a Romanian secret agent who defected to France in 1981. He belonged to the "Direcția Informații Externe" (Foreign Intelligence Directorate) of the Securitate.

He was born in Bucharest as Matei Pavel Hirsch. Haiducu's father was a high-ranked official in the Interior Ministry under the Romanian Communist regime.

Starting in 1975, he lived in France, being involved in industrial espionage for Romania, especially on nuclear technology. On January 13, 1981, Haiducu received an order from his superior, General Nicolae Pleșiță, to kill Virgil Tănase and Paul Goma, two prominent Romanian dissident writers living in France. However, instead of doing that, he revealed the orders to the French secret service, the Direction de la surveillance du territoire (Directorate of Territorial Surveillance), and organized an attempt on Goma's life (however, his poisoned drink was spilled by a "clumsy guest", who was in fact a French agent) and staged Tănase's simulated kidnapping and murder, with witnesses seeing him on May 20, 1982, being pushed into a car.

The French president, François Mitterrand, was also involved. On June 9, 1982, he held a press conference in which he attacked Romanian President Nicolae Ceaușescu for this incident and postponed a visit to Romania. Haiducu was able to return to Romania to fetch his family. After he and his family had escaped to France, the news broke and several French newspapers published the story. Meanwhile, Tănase was living in the region of Brittany in northwestern France. He held a press conference on August 25, 1982. He was sentenced to death in absentia and his properties were seized.

Haiducu settled in France and lived under the name of Mathieu Forestier, marrying a French woman and having two children. In 1984, he published a book (J'ai Refusé De Tuer — "I Refused to Kill") with details on the affair. Haiducu died in 1998.

== See also ==
- List of Eastern Bloc defectors
