= Dolj Region =

Region of the People's Republic of Romania

Dolj Region within the administrative divisions of Romania, 1950–1952

Regiunea Dolj (Dolj Region) was one of the newly established (in 1950) administrative divisions of the People's Republic of Romania, copied after the Soviet style of territorial organisation.

== History ==
The capital of the region was Craiova, and its territory comprised what is today Dolj County. In 1952 it merged with Gorj Region to form the Craiova Region.

== Neighbours ==
Dolj Region had as neighbours:

- East: Teleorman Region and Argeș Region.
- South: People's Republic of Bulgaria.
- West: People's Republic of Bulgaria and Socialist Federal Republic of Yugoslavia
- North: Gorj Region and Vâlcea Region.

== Raions ==
Dolj Region comprised the following raions: Craiova, Cujmir, Plenița, Calfat, Băilești, Segarcea, Gura Jiului, Corabia, Caracal, Balș.
