= Stalin Region =

1952–1968 Romanian administrative territorial entity

Regiunea Stalin (1952–1960) Regiunea Brașov (1960–1968)
- Region (Regiune)
- Country: People's Republic of Romania
- Region seat (reședință de regiune): Orașul Stalin/Brașov
- Established: 1950
- Ceased to exist: 1968
- Time zone: UTC+2 (EET)
  - Summer (DST): UTC+3 (EEST)

Stalin Region within the administrative divisions of Romania, 1950–1952

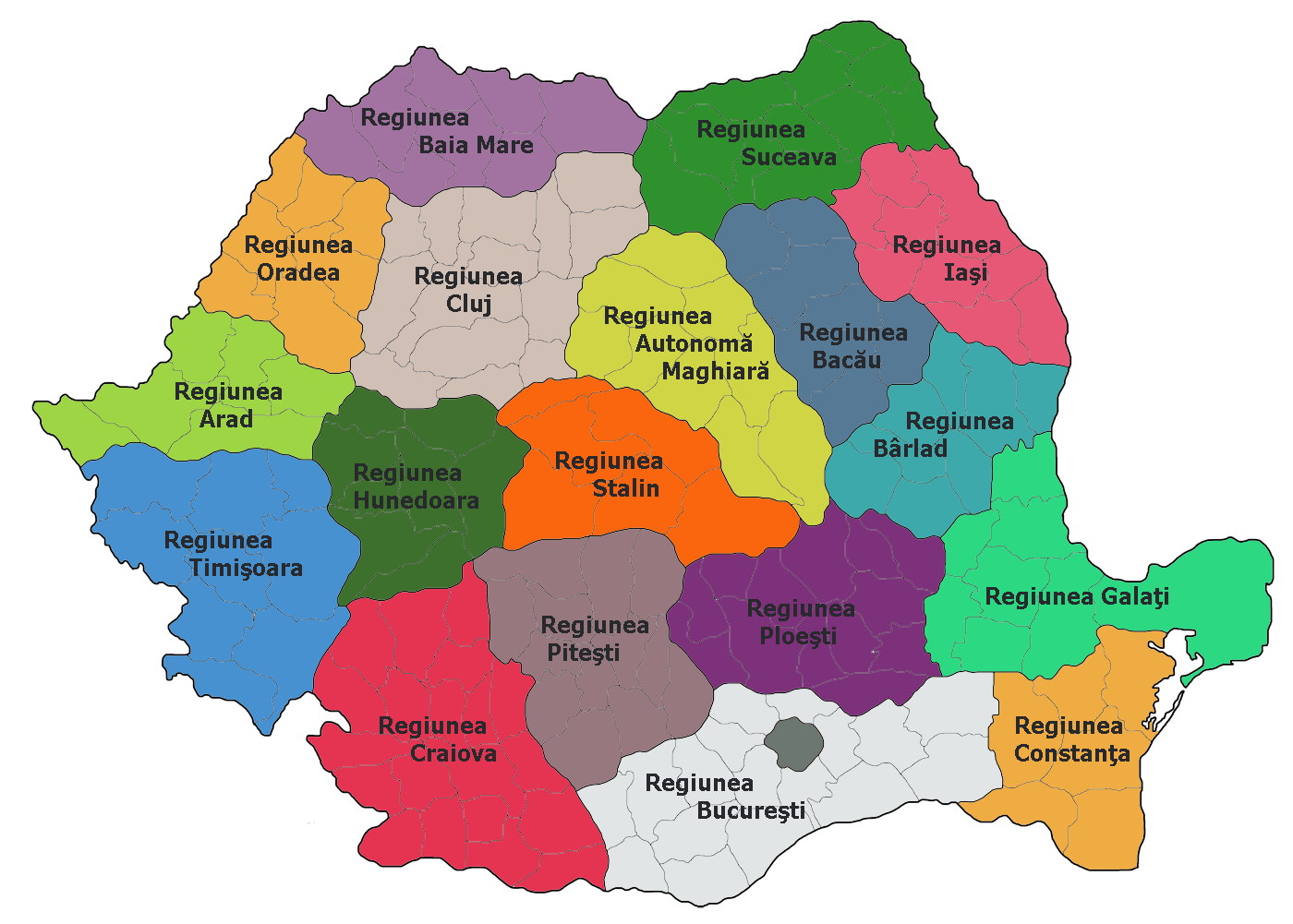
Stalin Region within the administrative divisions of Romania, 1952–1956

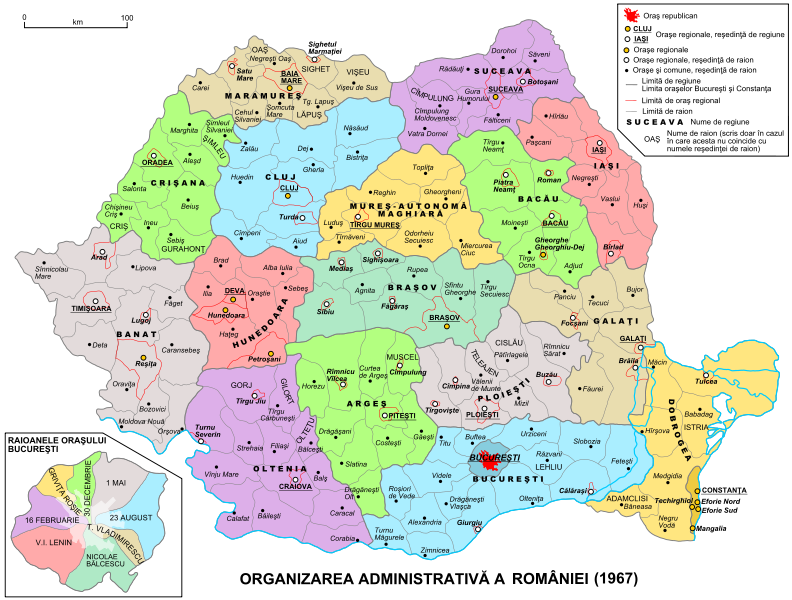
Brașov Region within the administrative divisions of Romania, 1960–1968

Regiunea Stalin (Stalin Region) was one of the administrative divisions of the People's Republic of Romania. It was established in 1950, in the Soviet style of territorial organization, and was named after Joseph Stalin. Its name was changed to Brașov Region in 1960, and it was disestablished in 1968.

== History ==
In 1950, the capital of the region was Orașul Stalin (Stalin City, now Brașov) and its territory comprised an area similar to what are nowadays the eastern part of Brașov County, together with Covasna County and part of Harghita County. Initially, the Stalin Region comprised 6 raions: Ciuc, Odorhei, Racoș, Sfântu Gheorghe, Stalin, and Târgu Secuiesc.

In 1952, the Ciuc, Odorhei, Sfântu Gheorghe, and Târgu Secuiesc raions were transferred to the newly established Magyar Autonomous Region, while the raions Sibiu, Făgăraș, Mediaș, Agnita, Sighișoara, and Târnăveni were included in the Stalin Region.

In 1960, the region was renamed Brașov Region, while the name of the capital city reverted to Brașov. Some areas in the Magyar Autonomous Region reverted to the Brașov Region, which after 1960 comprised the following raions: Agnita, Făgăraș, Mediaș, Rupea, Sfântu Gheorghe, Sibiu, Sighișoara, and Târgu Secuiesc.

== Neighbors ==
- From 1950 to 1956, Stalin Region had as neighbors:
  - East: Bacău Region and Putna Region.
  - South: Buzău Region and Prahova Region.
  - West: Argeș Region and Sibiu Region.
  - North: Mureș Region.
- From 1956 to 1960, Stalin Region had as neighbors:
  - East: Magyar Autonomous Region.
  - South: Ploiești Region and Pitești Region.
  - West: Hunedoara Region.
  - North: Cluj Region.
- From 1960 to 1968, Brașov Region had as neighbors:
  - East: Bacău Region and Galați Region.
  - South: Ploiești Region and Argeș Region.
  - West: Hunedoara Region.
  - North: Cluj Region and Mureș-Magyar Autonomous Region.

== See also ==
- Former administrative divisions of Romania
- Regions of the People's Republic of Romania
- List of places named after Joseph Stalin
