= Bârlad Region =

Bârlad Region within the administrative divisions of Romania, 1950–1952

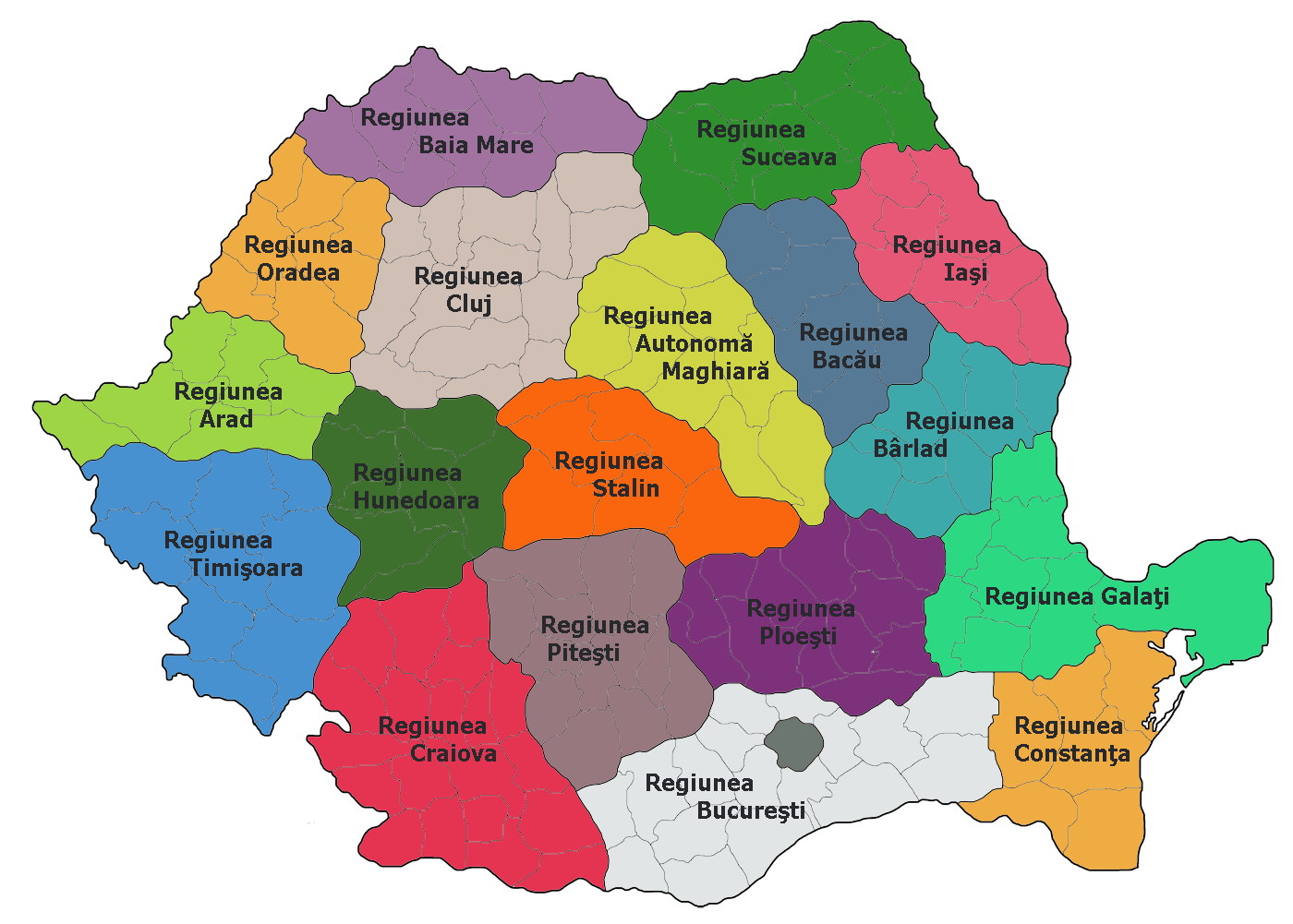
Bârlad Region within the administrative divisions of Romania, 1952–1956

Regiunea Bârlad (Bârlad Region) was one of the newly established (in 1950) administrative divisions of the People's Republic of Romania, copied after the Soviet style of territorial organisation.

== History ==
The capital of the region was Bârlad, and its territory comprised an area similar to the nowadays Vaslui County. After the 1952 reorganisation, the region merged with Putna Region, keeping its name and losing raions Vaslui and Huși to Iași Region; raion Fălciu changed name and capital to Murgeni.

In 1956 the region was dissolved and its raions went either to Bacău Region (Zeletin, Adjud), Galați Region (Tecuci, Focșani, Vrancea, Panciu), or Iași Region (Bârlad, Murgeni).

== Neighbors ==
Bârlad Region had as neighbors:

- 1950–1952: East: Moldavian Soviet Socialist Republic; South: Galați Region and Putna Region; West: Bacău Region; North: Iași Region.
- 1952–1956: East: Moldavian Soviet Socialist Republic; South: Galați Region and Ploiești Region; West: Magyar Autonomous Region and Bacău Region; North: Iași Region.

== Raions ==
- 1950–1952: Bârlad, Vaslui, Huși, Zeletin, Fălciu.
- 1952–1956: Bârlad, Vaslui, Huși, Zeletin, Murgeni, Tecuci, Focșani, Vrancea, Panciu.
