= București Region =

Regiunea București (București/Bucharest region) was one of the newly established (in 1950) administrative divisions of the People's Republic of Romania, copied after the Soviet style of territorial organization.

Bucharest region between 1952 and 1960 - the rayons are numbered in the order listed.

== History ==
The capital of the region was Bucharest, and at first, its territory comprised an area similar to the nowadays Ilfov and Giurgiu counties. In 1952 it assimilated the dissolved Ialomița Region (without raions Fetești, to Constanța Region, and Urziceni, to Ploiești Region; both taken in 1960) and Teleorman regions, reaching an area slightly smaller than nowadays Ialomița, Călărași, Ilfov, Giurgiu, and Teleorman counties.

== Neighbors ==
București region had as neighbors:

- 1950–1952: East: Ialomița Region; South: People's Republic of Bulgaria; West: Teleorman Region; North: Argeș Region and Prahova Region.
- 1952–1960: East: Constanța Region; South: People's Republic of Bulgaria; West: Craiova Region; North: Pitești Region, Ploiești Region, and Galați Region.
- 1960–1968: East: Dobrogea Region; South: People's Republic of Bulgaria; West: Oltenia Region; North: Argeș Region, Ploiești Region, and Galați Region.

== Raions ==
- 1950–1952: București, Giurgiu, Mihăilești, Crevedia, Răcari, Snagov, Brănești, Oltenița, Vidra.
- 1952–1960: București, Giurgiu, Mihăilești, Crevedia, Răcari, Snagov, Brănești, Oltenița, Vidra, Slobozia, Călărași, Lehliu, Vida, Alexandria, Zimnicea, Vârtoapele, Roșiori de Vede, Drăgănești, Turnu Măgurele.
- 1960–1968: București, Giurgiu, Mihăilești, Crevedia, Răcari, Snagov, Brănești, Oltenița, Vidra, Slobozia, Călărași, Lehliu, Vida, Alexandria, Zimnicea, Vârtoapele, Roșiori de Vede, Drăgănești, Turnu Măgurele, Fetești, Urziceni.
