= Bacău Region =

Bacău Region within the administrative divisions of Romania, 1950–1952

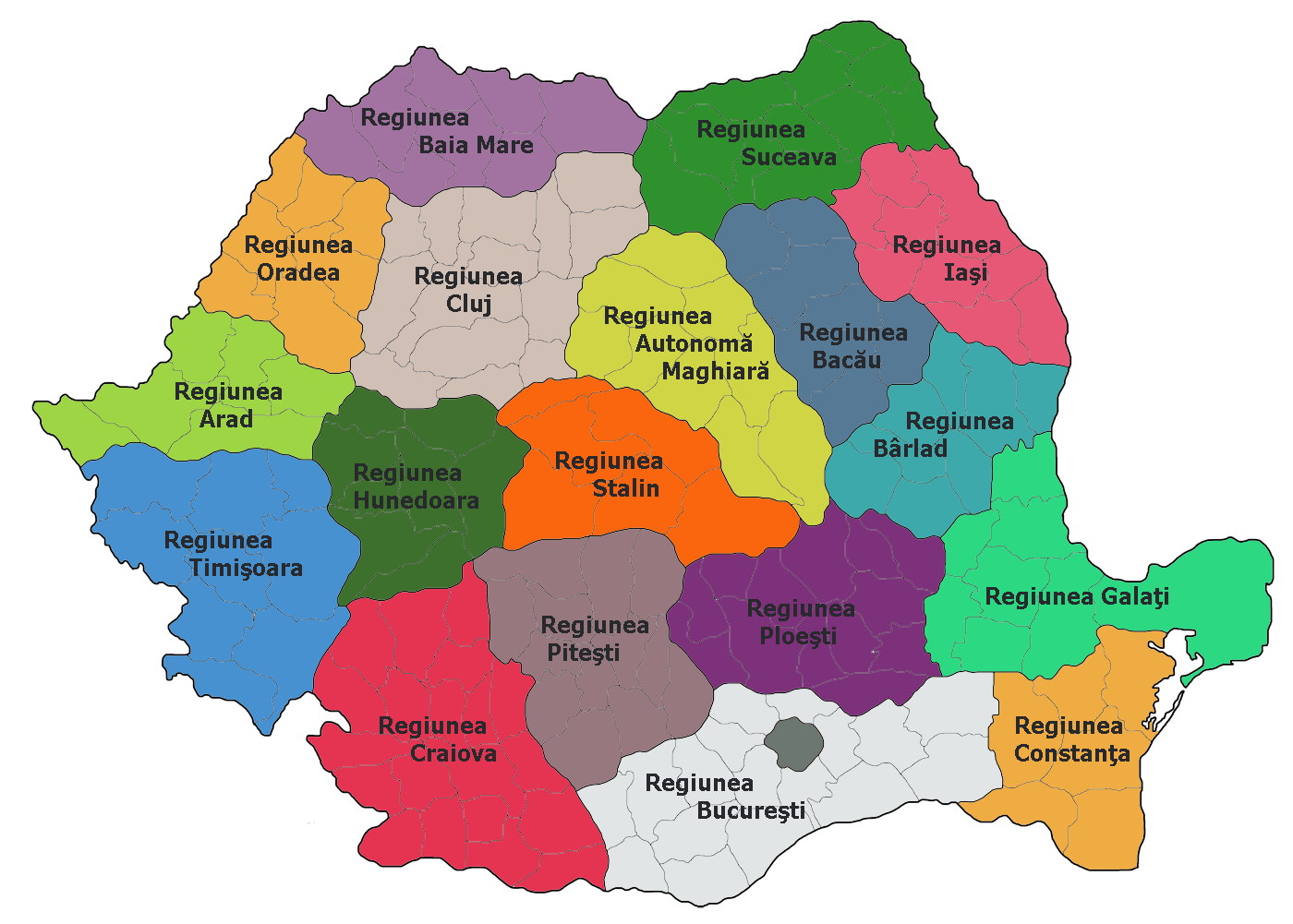
Bacău Region within the administrative divisions of Romania, 1952–1956

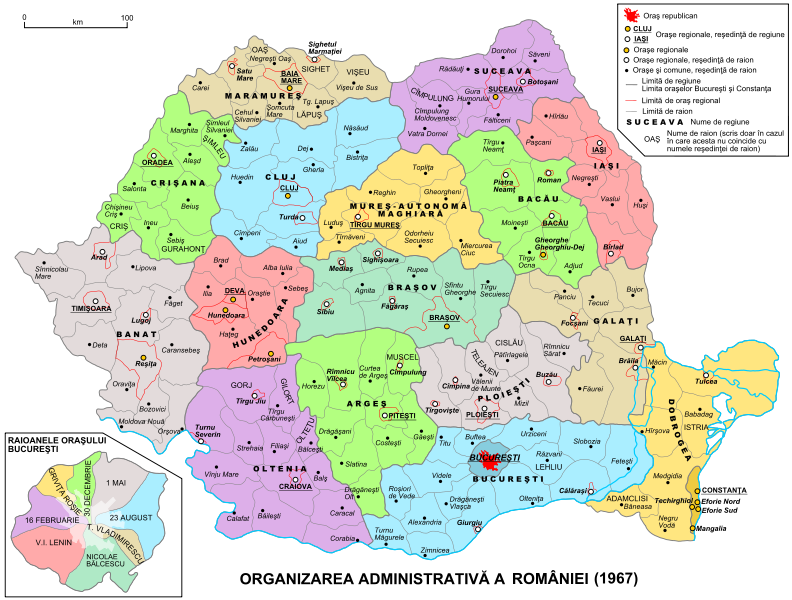
Bacău Region within the administrative divisions of Romania, 1960–1968

Bacău Region (Regiunea Bacău) was one of the newly established (in 1950) administrative divisions of the People's Republic of Romania, copied after the Soviet style of territorial organisation.

== History ==
The capital of the region was Bacău, and its territory comprised an area similar to the nowadays Bacău and Neamț counties. In 1956 the region included the Zeletin and Adjud raions from the dissolved Bârlad Region and the Roman Raion from Iași Region. In 1960 the Zeletin Raion was dissolved, most of the component communes passing to Adjud Raion, and in 1964 Buhuși Raion was dissolved, and all its communes were included into Bacău and Piatra Neamț raions.

== Neighbors ==
Bacău Region had as neighbors:

- 1950–1952: East: Iași Region and Bârlad Region; South: Putna Region and Stalin Region; West: Mureș Region; North: Suceava Region.
- 1952–1956: East: Iași Region; South: Bârlad Region; West: Magyar Autonomous Region; North: Suceava Region.
- 1956–1968: East: Iași Region; South: Galați Region; West: Brașov Region and Magyar Autonomous Region; North: Suceava Region.

== Rayons ==
- 1950–1952: Bacău, Moinești, Târgu Ocna, Buhuși, Piatra Neamț, Târgu Neamț.
- 1952–1956: Bacău, Moinești, Târgu Ocna, Buhuși, Piatra Neamț, Târgu Neamț, Ceahlău.
- 1956–1960: Bacău, Moinești, Târgu Ocna, Buhuși, Piatra Neamț, Târgu Neamț, Zeletin (centered on Podu Turcului), Adjud, Roman.
- 1960–1964: Bacău, Moinești, Târgu Ocna, Buhuși, Piatra Neamț, Târgu Neamț, Adjud, Roman.
- 1964–1968: Bacău, Moinești, Târgu Ocna, Piatra Neamț, Târgu Neamț, Adjud, Roman.
