= Arad Region =

People's Republic of Romania

Arad Region within the administrative divisions of Romania, 1950–1952

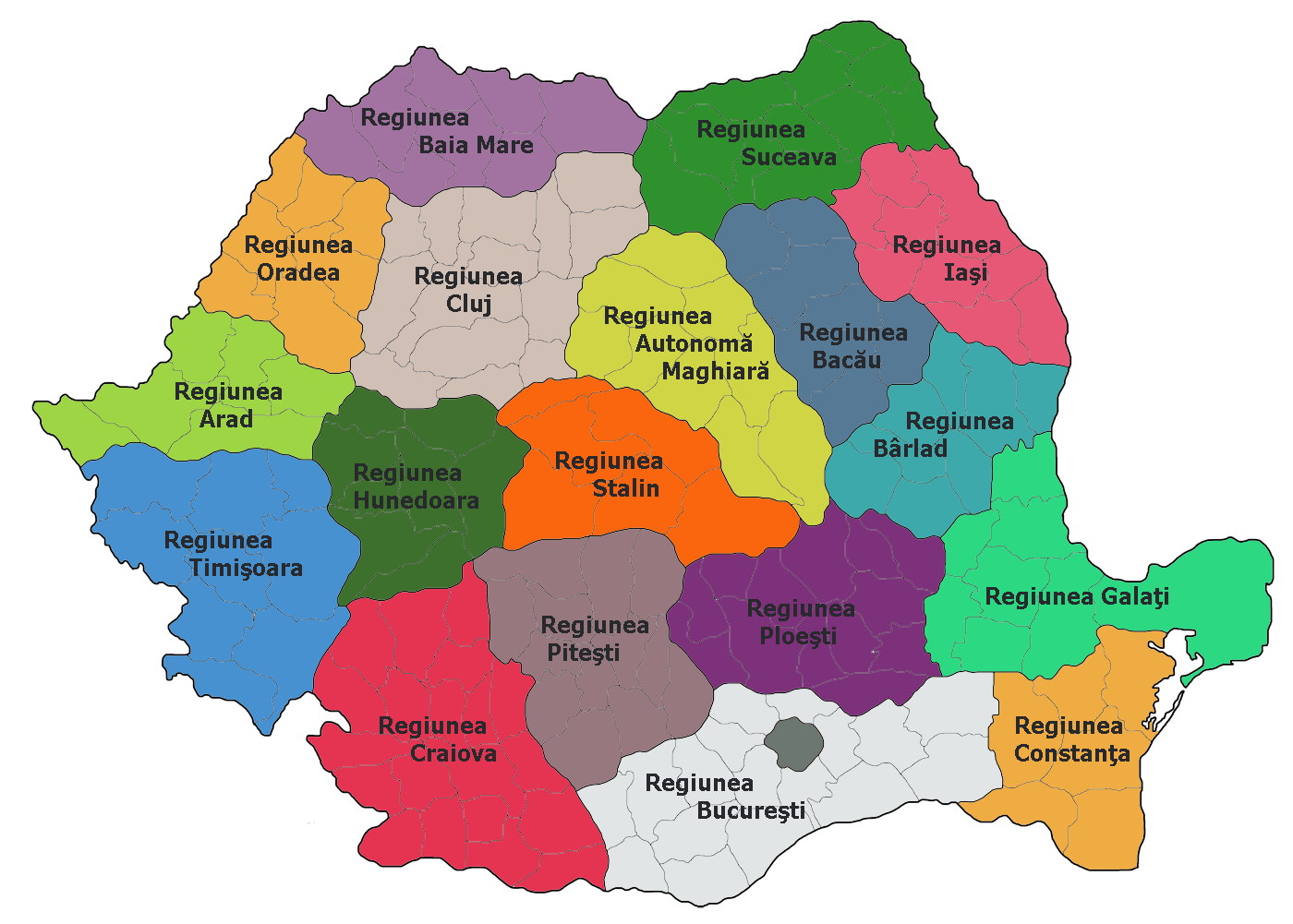
Arad Region within the administrative divisions of Romania, 1952–1956

Arad Region (Regiunea Arad) was one of the newly established (in 1950) administrative divisions of the People's Republic of Romania, copied after the Soviet style of territorial organisation. It existed until 1956, when its territory was divided between the Timișoara Region and Oradea Region.

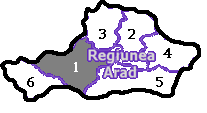
Arad Region between 1952 and 1956; the rayons are numbered in the order listed.

== History ==
The capital of the region was Arad, and its territory comprised an area only a bit larger than the nowadays Arad County.

Initially the region didn't comprise the area of Sânnicolau Mare which it was attributed by the 1952 administrative reorganisation.

== Neighbors ==
Arad region had as neighbors:

- 1950–1952: East: Hunedoara Region; South: Timișoara Region; West: Hungarian People's Republic; North: Cluj Region and Bihor Region.
- 1952–1956: East: Hunedoara Region; South: Timișoara Region; West: Hungarian People's Republic; North: Cluj Region and Oradea Region.

== Rayons ==
- 1950–1952: Arad, Ineu, Criș, Gurahonț, Lipova.
- 1952–1956: Arad, Ineu, Criș, Gurahonț, Lipova, Sânnicolau Mare.
