= Magyar Autonomous Region =

1952–1968 Romanian administrative territorial entity

Magyar Autonomous Region: Regiunea Autonomă Maghiară; Magyar Autonóm Tartomány
- Autonomous region of the Romanian People's Republic
- 1952–1968
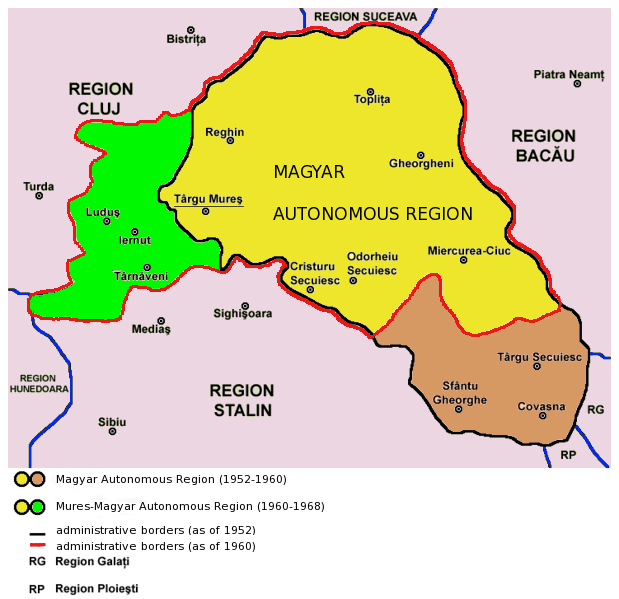
- Magyar Autonomous Region (1952–1960: yellow and brown); Mureș-Magyar Autonomous Region (1960–1968: yellow and green).
- Capital: Târgu Mureș
- History
  - Established: 1952
  - Disestablished: 1968
- Today part of: Romania

The Magyar Autonomous Region^{[a]} (1952–1960) (Romanian: Regiunea Autonomă Maghiară; Hungarian: Magyar Autonóm Tartomány) and Mureș-Magyar Autonomous Region (1960–1968) were autonomous regions in the Romanian People's Republic (later the Socialist Republic of Romania). They covered the historic region of Székely Land, inhabited largely by ethnic Hungarians.

== History ==
One of the key factors behind the autonomous region was the desire of the communist Romanian government to win over the Hungarian population in Transylvania. Support for the Romanian Communist Party was very strong in ethnically Hungarian areas, and Hungarian communists made up 26% of all communists in Romania before World War II. Following the Hungarian rule of Northern Transylvania during World War II, ethnic Hungarians now made up 10% of Romanian population, and the communist government adopted a policy of appeasement towards the Hungarian minority; this was a pragmatic stance as in contrast to largely pro-socialist Hungarians in Romania, ethnic Romanians were unsupportive of the Communist Party and the communist base there was weak. In 1950, Romania adopted a Soviet-style administrative and territorial division of the country into regions and raions (until then, Romania had been divided into județe or counties).

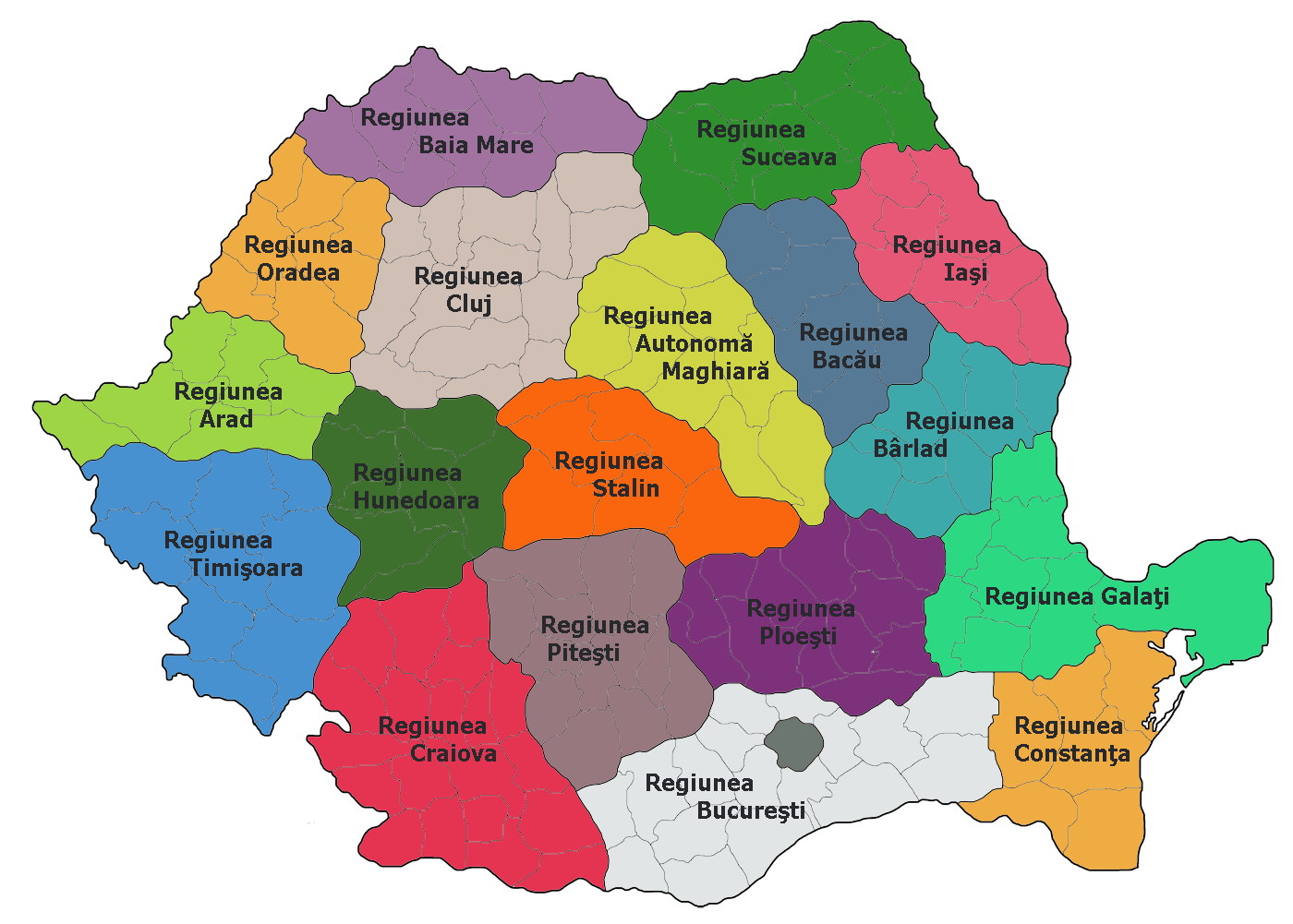
The Magyar Autonomous Region in Romania, in 1952–1960.

Two years later, in 1952, under Soviet pressure, the number of regions was reduced and by comprising ten raions from the former Mureș Region and from the Stalin Region (both of them created in 1950), of the territory inhabited by a compact population of Székely Hungarians, a new region called the Magyar Autonomous Region was created. According to the 1956 census, the total population of the region was 731,361, distributed among the ethnic groups as follows: Hungarians (77.3%), Romanians (20.1%), Roma (1.5%), Germans (0.4%) and Jews (0.4%). The official languages of the province were Hungarian and Romanian and the provincial administrative centre was Târgu Mureș (Marosvásárhely). The Magyar Autonomous Region comprised 9 raions: Ciuc, Gheorgheni, Odorhei, Reghin, Sângeorgiu de Pădure, Sfântu Gheorghe, Târgu Mureș, Târgu Secuiesc, and Toplița.

Its status laid out in the 1952 Constitution, the region encompassed about a third of Romania's Hungarians, the rest living either in more Romanian areas or along the border with Hungary, where an ethnic-based region might have stoked fears of irredentism and security concerns. In practice, the region's status differed in no way from that of the other seventeen regions and it did not enjoy autonomy of any kind – laws, decisions and directives from the centre were rendered compulsory by the very constitution that created it, and the State Council of the Autonomous Region was merely a façade. Tadeusz Kopyś remarked that "the status of the autonomous province practically did not differ from those of other Romanian provinces, the only advantage of this arrangement being that the officials in charge were mostly local people". The Region's only distinguishing features were that most of its officials were Hungarian, the Hungarian language could be used in administration and the courts, and bilingual signs were put up on public buildings. Moreover, the specifically Hungarian wing of the Romanian Communist Party was abolished in 1953, ending any mechanism for defending of Hungarian minority rights.

The creation of the autonomous region, although it had practically no autonomy, shocked Romanian political circles because of the widespread anti-Hungarian sentiment. Many Romanian politicians condemned the autonomy and claimed that Hungary could annex the region. The autonomous region also triggered a reaction from other minorities - Germans and Jews living in Romania also began to apply for their own autonomous regions, and such applications were discussed at party meetings. The Hungarian population and diplomats praised this symbolic concession and considered it conciliatory. Despite the severely limited scope of this autonomy, the creation of the region fostered a golden era of Hungarian cultural life - many Hungarian-language operas and theatres became active in Transylvanian cities, and numerous Hungarian universities were also established during this period, including a medical school in Târgu Mureș and a university in Cluj. According to the region's leadership, autonomy served not only the Hungarian minority but also "the entire provincial community". A young Jewish worker is reported to have said that Transylvanian autonomy "offered a real basis for equality, while the previous regime had built gas chambers for his ancestors".

The population of the region reacted with an outpouring of sympathy for the Hungarian Revolution of 1956, triggering mass protests by local students. Several Hungarian organisations that existed in Transylvania openly expressed their sympathy for the uprising across the border. The Romanian authorities reacted harshly to the revolutionary mood and suppressed the protests through mass arrests. Eventually, several thousand Hungarian students were sent to labour camps, and the incident encouraged Romanian politicians to undermine Hungarian autonomy in Transylvania. The demonstrations also sparked a reaction against the Catholic clergy in Transylvania, with many priests being deported. American journalist George Bailey reported: "Thousands of Hungarians were arrested, probably hundreds murdered. Earlier this year some eight thousand were released amid fanfare on the strength of a general amnesty announced by the Romanian government. But based on information I have collected in my many travels across Transylvania, none of those arrested after the 1956 insurrection was released."

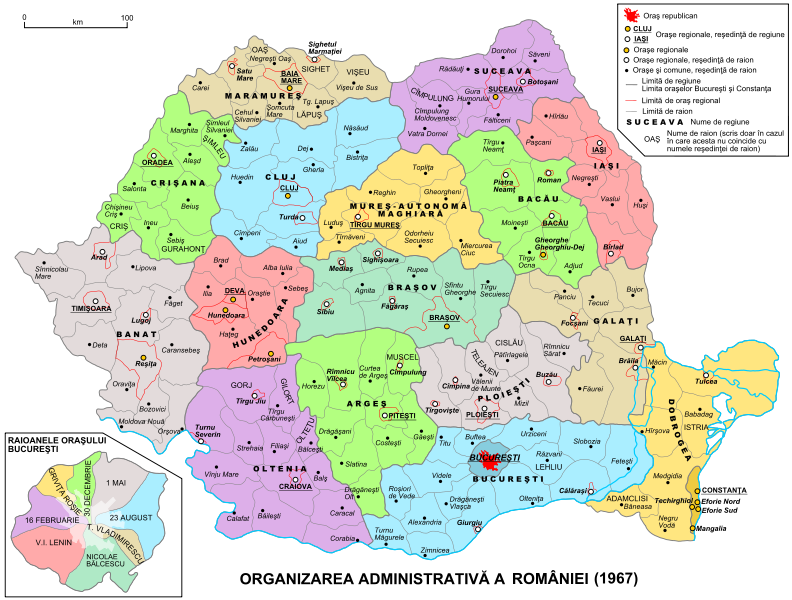
The regions of People's Republic of Romania between 1960–1968.

In December 1960, a governmental decree modified the boundaries of the Magyar Autonomous Region. Its southern raions were reattached to Brașov Region (former Stalin Region) and in place of this, several raions were joined to it from Cluj Region. The region was called the Mureș Region-Magyar Autonomous, after the Mureș River. The ratio of Hungarians was thus reduced from 77.3% to 62%. According to Kopyś, this was done to water down the proportion of Hungarians in preparation to eventually abolishing the autonomy of the region.

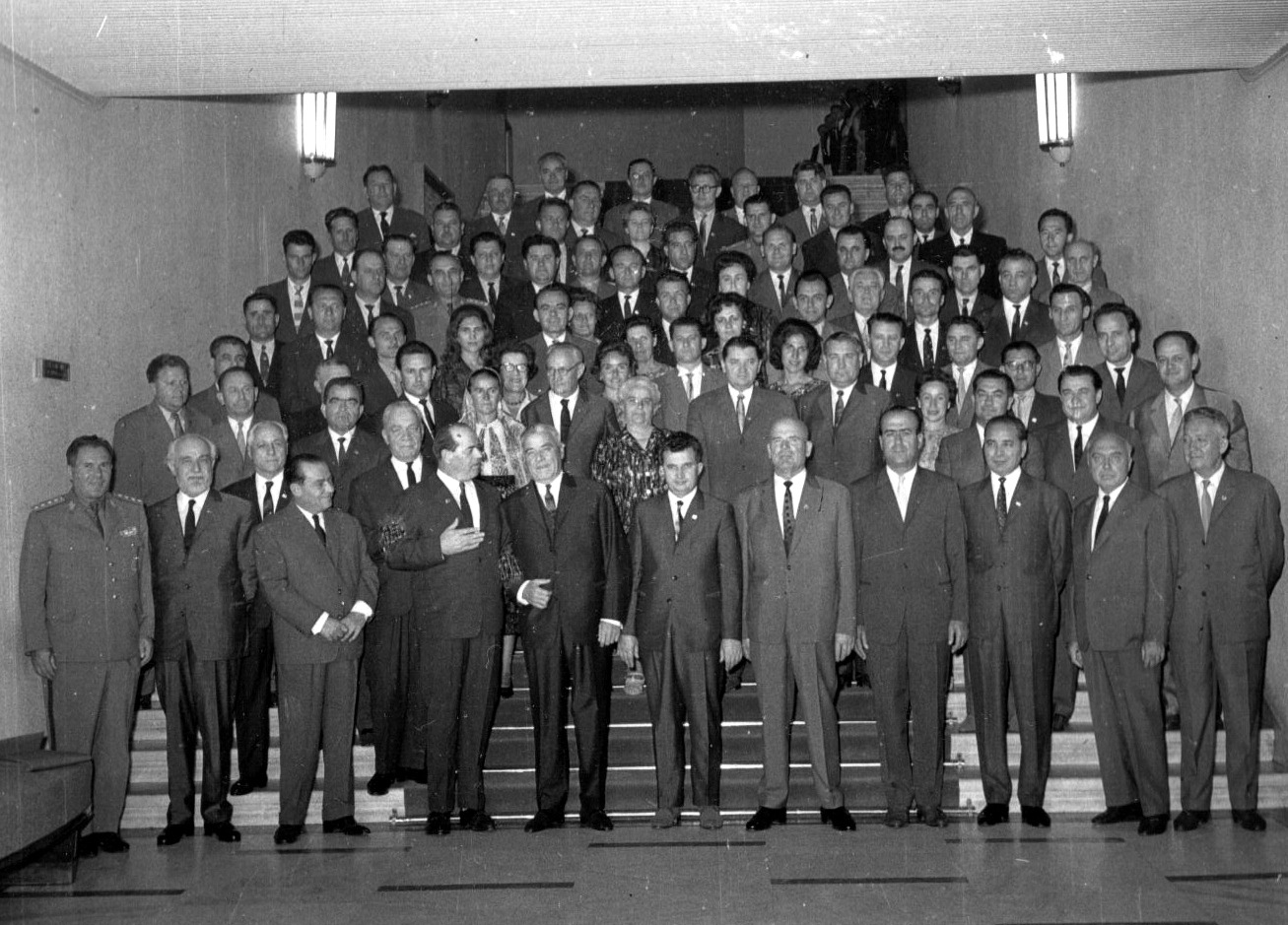
Nicolae Ceaușescu and the Mureș-Magyar Autonomous Region delegation at the IXth Congress of the Romanian Communist Party in July 1965.

In 1968, the Great National Assembly put an end to the soviet style administrative division of the country into regions and re-introduced the historical judeţ (county) system, still used today. This also automatically eliminated the Mureș-Magyar Autonomous Region and replaced it with counties that are not identified with any nationality. The two new counties formed on the majority of the territory of former Mureș-Magyar Autonomous Region are Mureș County and Harghita County, plus one from the former Magyar Autonomous Region until 1960 and part of the Brașov Region in 1968, Covasna County.

In two of these counties, Harghita and Covasna, Hungarians form the majority of inhabitants. The Romanian law enables the usage of the language of an ethnic minority which forms at least 20% of the population of a municipality in relation with the administration, and the state provides education and public signage in the language of the respective ethnic minority.

== Neighbors ==
- Magyar Autonomous Region had as neighbors (1952–1960):

East: Bacău Region and Bârlad Region;
South: Stalin Region and Ploiești Region;
West: Cluj Region;
North: Suceava Region.

- Mureș Region-Magyar Autonomous had as neighbors (1960–1968):

East: Bacău Region;
South: Brașov Region;
West: Cluj Region;
North: Suceava Region.

== See also ==
- Hungarians in Romania
- Székelys
- Székely Land
- Székely autonomy movement
- Csángó Land
- Partium
- Ethnic clashes of Târgu Mureș
- Northern Transylvania
- Transylvania

== Notes ==
a. Also informal referred to in some publications as Hungarian Autonomous Region or Mureș-Hungarian Autonomous Region
