= Argeș Region =

Regiunea Argeș (Argeș Region) was one of the newly established (in 1950) administrative divisions of the People's Republic of Romania, copied after the Soviet style of territorial organisation. It existed until 1952, when its territory merged with Vâlcea Region to form Pitești Region. After the 1956 reorganisation, Pitești Region changed its name back to Argeș.

== History ==
The capital of the region was Pitești, and its territory comprised an area similar to the nowadays Argeș County, before the 1956 reorganisation. After the reorganisation it also comprised some of the area of the current Vâlcea and Argeș counties.

== Neighbors ==
Argeș Region had as neighbors:

- 1950–1952: East: Prahova Region and București Region; South: Teleorman Region and Dolj Region; West: Vâlcea Region; North: Sibiu Region and Stalin Region.
- 1956–1968: East: Ploiești Region; South: București Region; West: Oltenia Region; North: Stalin Region/Brașov Region.

== Raions ==
Argeș Region had the following raions

- 1950–1952: Pitești, Slatina, Costești, Muscel, Curtea de Argeș.
- 1956–1968: Pitești, Râmnicu Vâlcea, Slatina, Loviștea, Muscel, Curtea de Argeș, Costești, Topoloveni, Găești, Drăganești, Drăgășani, Băbeni-Bistrița, Horezu.
