= Andrei Muraru =

Romanian historian (born 1982)

Dan-Andrei Muraru
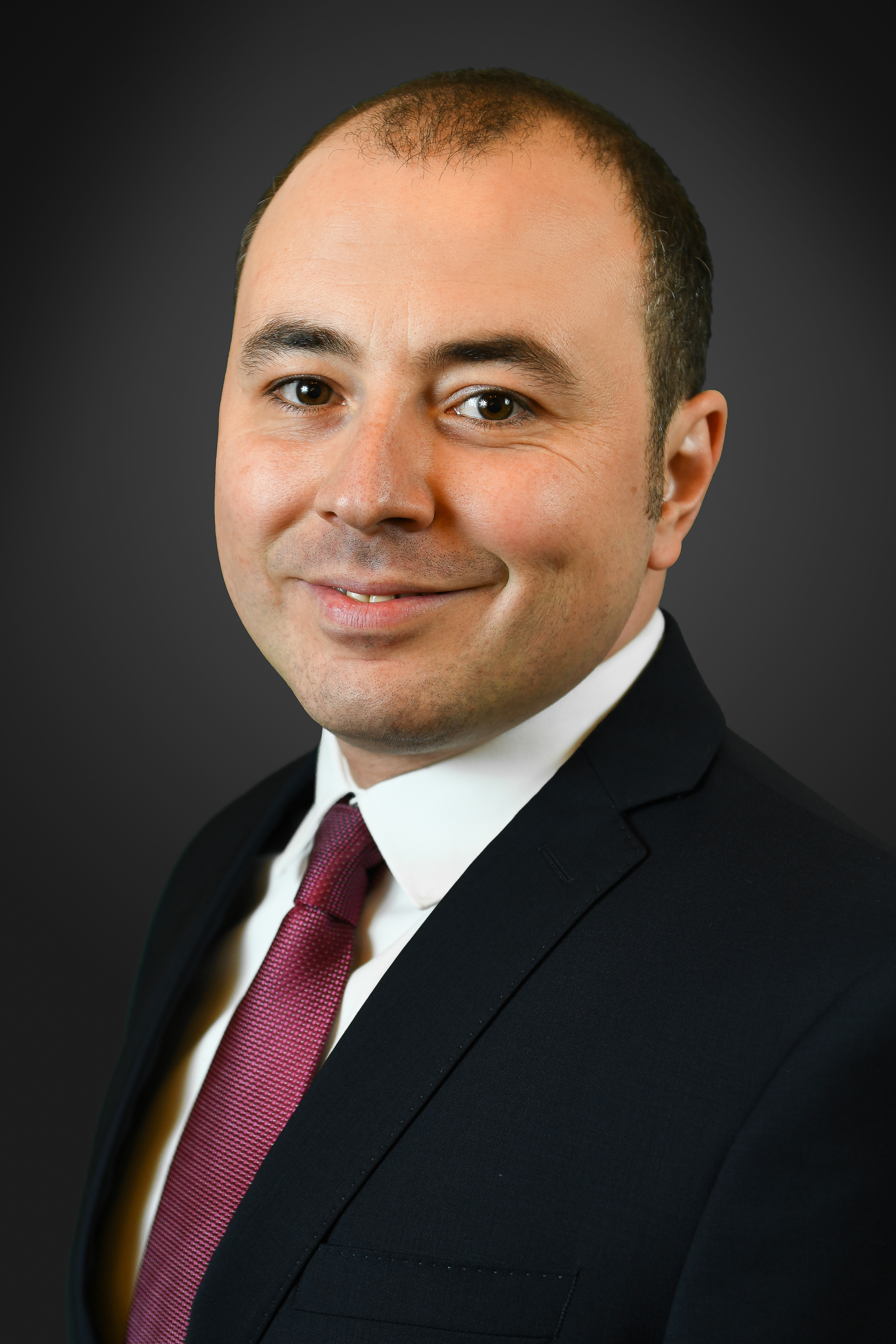
- Andrei Muraru in 2017
- Born: May 20, 1982 (age 44); Iași, Socialist Republic of Romania
- Education: Alexandru Ioan Cuza University
- Occupations: historian, diplomat
- Relatives: Alexandru Muraru

Dan-Andrei Muraru (born May 20, 1982) is a Romanian historian and diplomat.

Muraru was born in Iași and grew up in the city's Tătărași neighborhood. He graduated from the history faculty of Alexandru Ioan Cuza University in Iași in 2005. He earned a master’s degree from the same institution in 2007, and a doctorate in 2011, with a thesis on the war crimes trials for Transnistria Governorate. From 2012 to 2014, he headed the Institute for the Investigation of Communist Crimes in Romania. He began teaching at Bucharest’s National University of Political Studies and Public Administration in 2018. He has been an adviser to Klaus Iohannis since summer 2014, several months before the latter became President of Romania.

In 2021, Iohannis named Muraru ambassador of Romania to the United States. His twin brother Alexandru is a historian and politician.
