= Suceava Region =

Suceava Region within the administrative divisions of Romania, 1950–1952

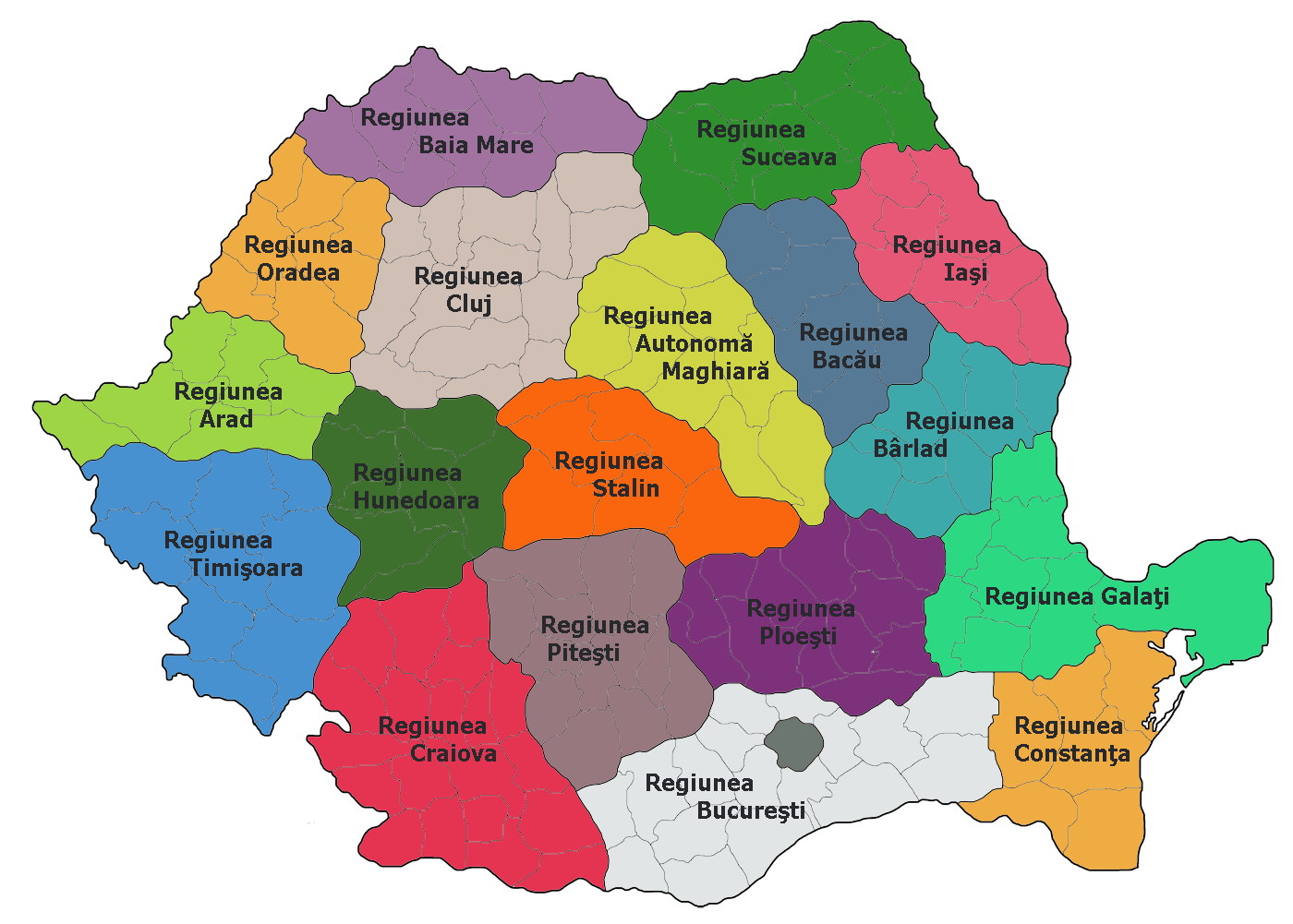
Suceava Region within the administrative divisions of Romania, 1952–1956

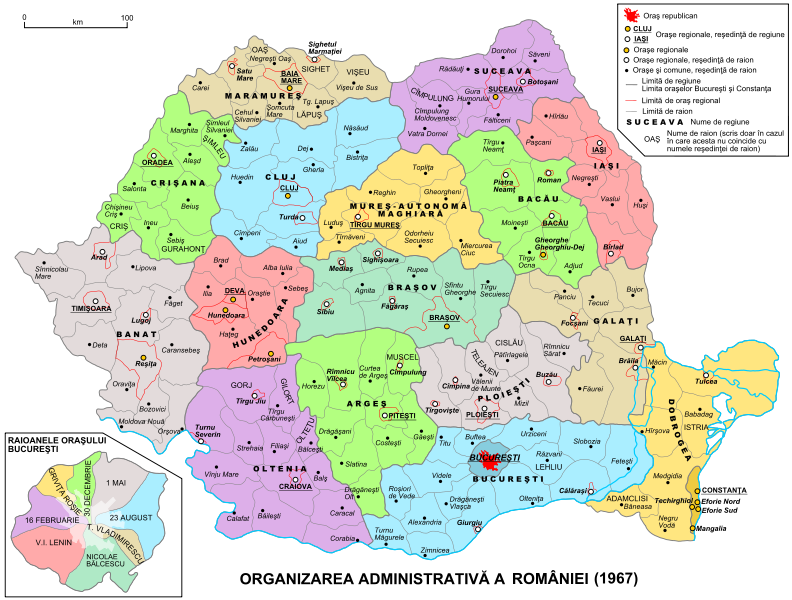
Suceava Region within the administrative divisions of Romania, 1960–1968

Suceava Region (Romanian: Regiunea Suceava) was an administrative-territorial division located in the northeastern part of the Romanian People's Republic, established in 1950, when the counties were abolished (by law no. 5 from 6 September 1950). It existed until 1968, when the regions were abolished.

== History ==
Initially, the residence of the region was in Câmpulung Moldovenesc. In 1952, the administrative center moved to Suceava. During that period, the territory of the region was similar to that of the present-day Suceava County.

Between 1956 and 1968, the region included a large part of the present Botoșani County, after the Botoșani Region was abolished and its districts came first under the jurisdiction of the Iași Region (1952), and then under the jurisdiction of the Suceava Region (1956).

The Suceava Region was reorganized in 1960 by the dissolution of the Darabani, Siret, and Trușești districts.

== Neighbors ==
- From 1950 to 1952, Suceava Region had as neighbors:
  - East: Botoșani Region.
  - South: Iași Region, Bacău Region, and Mureș Region.
  - West: Rodna Region.
  - North: Ukrainian Soviet Socialist Republic.
- From 1952 to 1960, Suceava Region had as neighbors:
  - East: Moldavian Soviet Socialist Republic.
  - South: Iași Region, Bacău Region, and Magyar Autonomous Region.
  - West: Cluj Region and Baia Mare Region.
  - North: Ukrainian Soviet Socialist Republic.
- From 1960 to 1968, Suceava Region had as neighbors:
  - East: Moldavian Soviet Socialist Republic.
  - South: Iași Region, Bacău Region, and Mureș-Magyar Autonomous Region.
  - West: Cluj Region and Maramureș Region.
  - North: Ukrainian Soviet Socialist Republic.

== Raions ==
Suceava Region consisted of the following raions:

- 1950–1956: Câmpulung, Fălticeni, Gura Humorului, Rădăuți, Siret, Suceava, Vatra Dornei.
- 1956–1960: Botoșani, Câmpulung, Darabani, Dorohoi, Fălticeni, Gura Humorului, Rădăuți, Săveni, Siret, Suceava, Trușești, Vatra Dornei.
- 1960–1968: Botoșani, Câmpulung, Dorohoi, Fălticeni, Gura Humorului, Rădăuți, Săveni, Suceava, Vatra Dornei.
