= Cluj Region =

Administrative division in the People's Republic of Romania

Cluj Region within the administrative divisions of Romania, 1950–1952

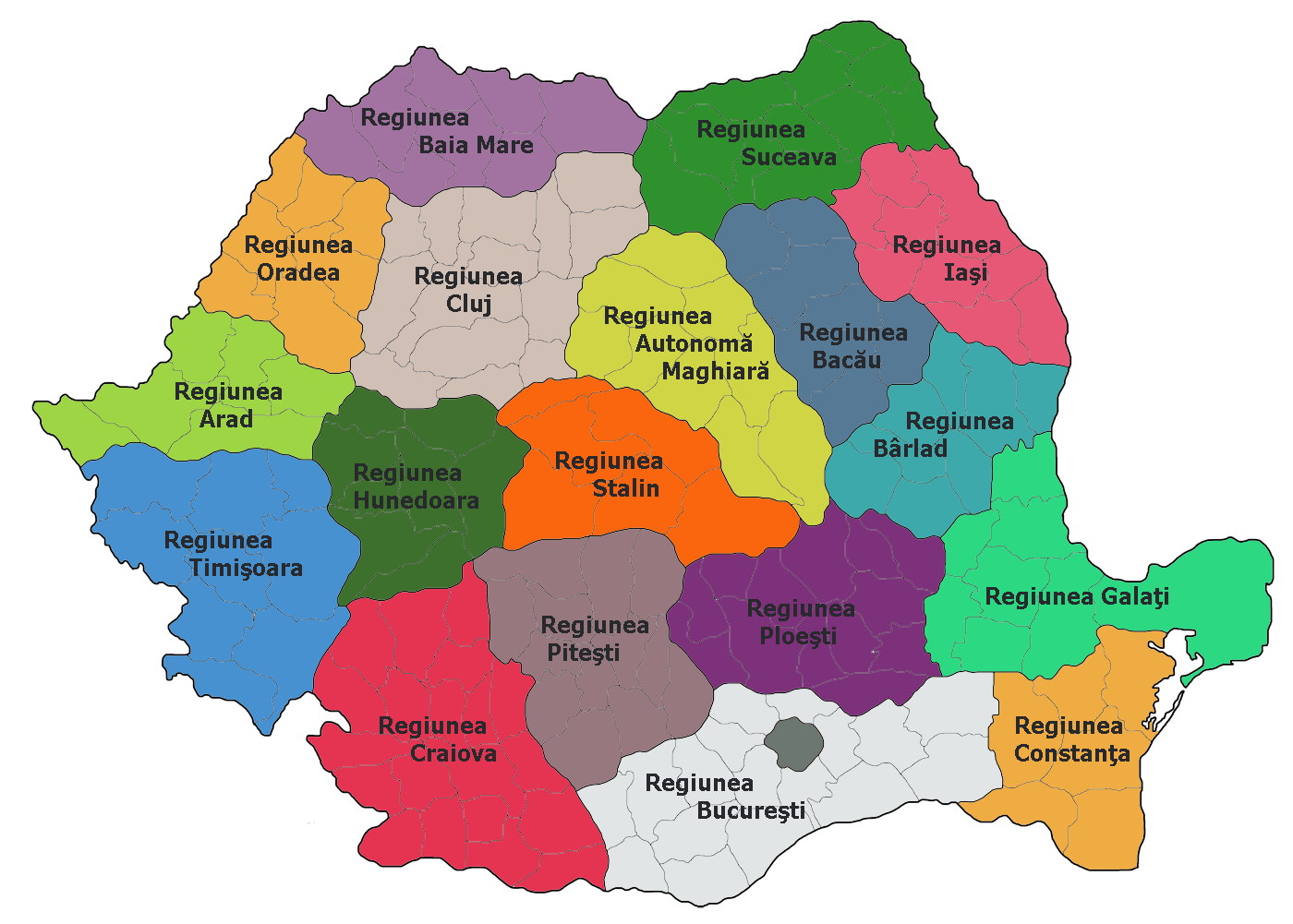
Cluj Region within the administrative divisions of Romania, 1952–1956

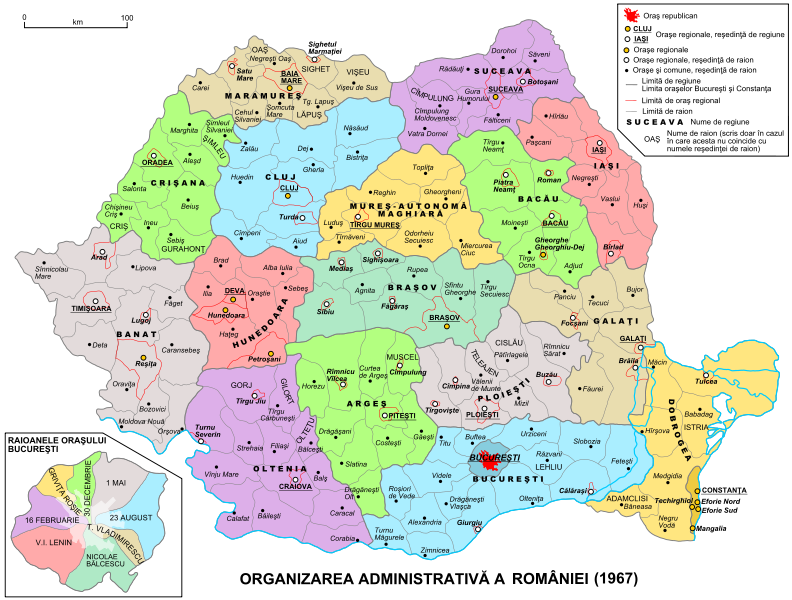
Cluj Region within the administrative divisions of Romania, 1960–1968

Regiunea Cluj (Cluj Region) was one of the administrative divisions of the People's Republic of Romania, established on September 6, 1950 by Law nr. 5, and set after the Soviet style.

== History ==
The capital of the region was the city of Cluj, and at first, its territory comprised an area slightly smaller than the nowadays Cluj and Sălaj counties. On September 19, 1952, the administrative regions of Romania were reorganized by Decree nr. 331. The Cluj Region assimilated the southern raion of the dissolved Rodna Region and a rayon from the reorganised Mureș Region, reaching an area slightly smaller than nowadays Cluj, Sălaj, and Bistrița-Năsăud counties. In 1960 it lost two rayons to the reorganized Magyar Autonomous Region.

== Neighbors ==
The Cluj Region had as neighbors:

- 1950–1952: East: Rodna Region and Mureș Region; South: Hunedoara Region and Arad Region; West: Bihor Region; North: Baia Mare Region.
- 1952–1960: East: Suceava Region and Magyar Autonomous Region; South: Stalin Region, Hunedoara Region, and Arad Region; West: Oradea Region; North: Baia Mare Region.
- 1960–1968: East: Suceava Region and Magyar Autonomous Region; South: Brașov Region and Hunedoara Region; West: Crișana Region; North: Maramureș region.

== Rayons ==
- 1950–1952: Cluj, Zalău, Huedin, Câmpeni, Dej, Turda, Gherla, Jibou, Aiud.
- 1952–1960: Cluj, Zalău, Huedin, Câmpeni, Dej, Turda, Gherla, Jibou, Aiud, Năsăud, Bistrița, Sărmaș, Luduș, Beclean.
- 1960–1968: Cluj, Zalău, Huedin, Câmpeni, Dej, Turda, Gherla, Jibou, Aiud, Năsăud, Bistrița, Beclean.
