= Dan Lungu =

Romanian writer (born 1969)

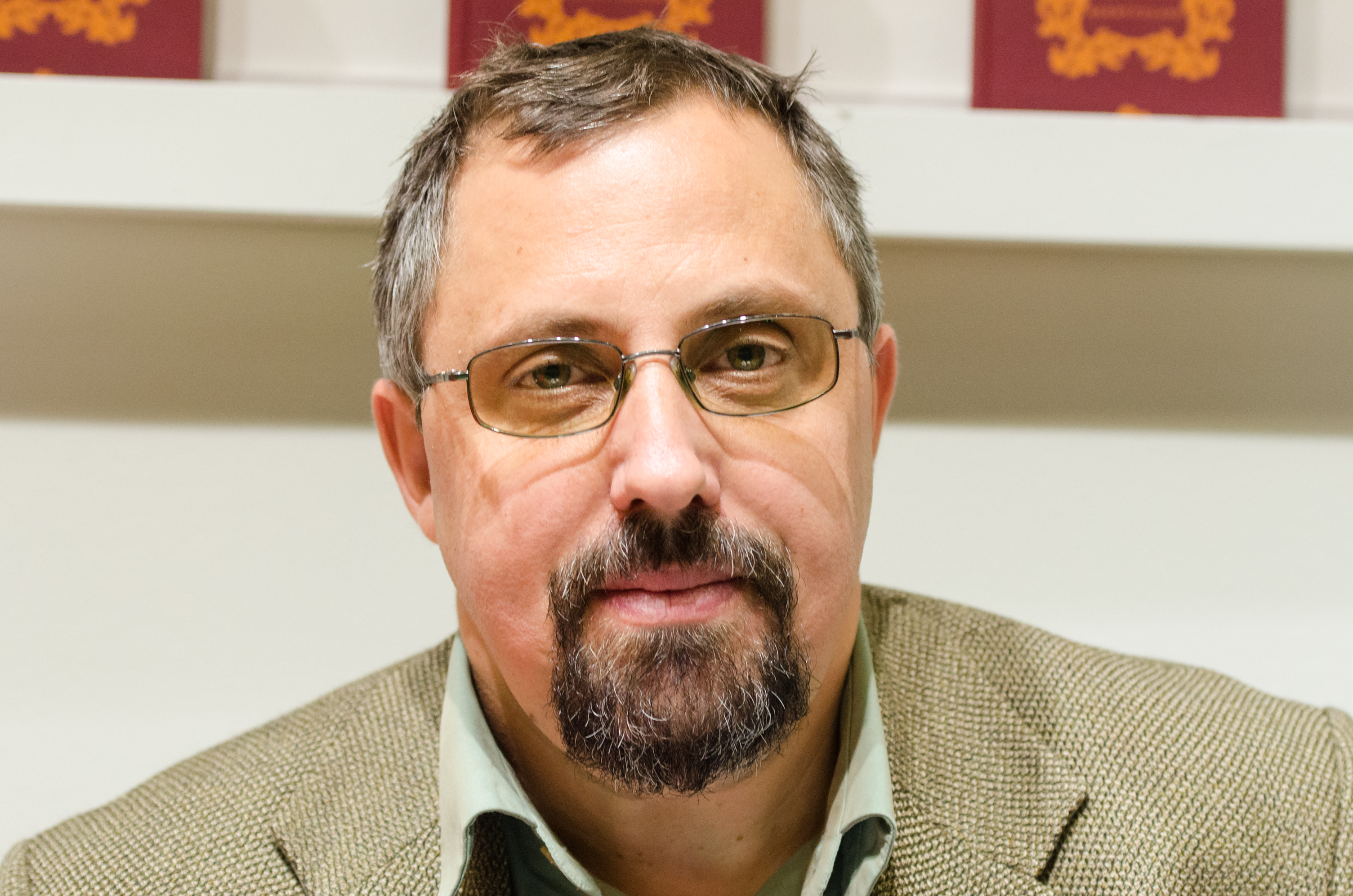
- Lungu at the Göteborg Book Fair (2013)
- Born: September 15, 1969; Botoșani, Romania
- Occupations: Novelist, short story writer, sociologist, poet, dramatist, journalist
- Spouse: Daniela Lungu
- Children: 2
- Writing career
- Years active: 1995–present
- Genres: Essay, satire, parable, Bildungsroman
- Literary movement: Neorealism, Postmodernism, Minimalism

Dan Lungu (Romanian pronunciation: [dan ˈluŋɡu]; born September 15, 1969) is a Romanian novelist, short story writer, poet and dramatist, also known as a literary theorist and sociologist. The recipient of critical acclaim for his short story volume Cheta la flegmă ("Quest for Phlegm") and his novels Raiul găinilor ("Chicken Paradise") and Sînt o babă comunistă! ("I'm a Communist Biddy!"), he is also one of the most successful authors to have emerged in post-1990 Romanian literature. Lungu's literary universe, which mainly comprises "microsocial" images of life under the communist regime and during the subsequent transitional period, bridges a form of Neorealism with Postmodernism. Often included among a group of authors who signed their first major contracts with Polirom publishing house, he is also seen as a distinctive voice from his adoptive provincial city of Iași.

A lecturer at the Faculty of Sociology, University of Iași, and former editor in chief of Timpul newspaper, Dan Lungu is also the noted author and co-author of essays and sociological research into everyday life under communist rule, scientific preoccupations which share similarities with his work in fiction. His main interests in the area of historical research include the feminine experience of totalitarian rule, the connection between official propaganda and the actual lives of working class members, and the development of cultural attitudes in relation to communist censorship.

== Biography ==
Born in Botoșani city into a Romanian Orthodox family, Lungu has been described as one of the decreței, or children of the baby boom imposed by the communist ban on abortion. He completed his education in Iași, at the local university's Sociology Department, while pursuing interests in track and field, as well as Go. Having received his Ph.D. with a thesis on identity formation, he later pursued postdoctoral studies at the University of Paris.

Lungu developed a passion for writing from a young age, but debuted in literature only in the early 1990s. In 1996, he and several other Iași-based authors founded the literary society Club 8, and he consequently came to be seen as its main theorist. Among those who frequented the circle during the following years were authors of various schools, such as Constantin Acosmei, Șerban Alexandru, Radu Andriescu, Michael Astner, Emil Brumaru, Mariana Codruț, Gabriel Horațiu Decuble, Radu Pavel Gheo, Florin Lăzărescu, Ovidiu Nimigean, Antonio Patraș, Dan Sociu and Lucian Dan Teodorovici.

The first volume bearing Lungu's signature saw print with Editura Junimea in 1996: a poetry collection, it carried the title Muchii ("Edges"). His stories, including Buldozeristul ("The Bulldozer Operator"), winner of the Editura Nemira prize for 1997, saw print in various venues during the late 1990s. Lungu also debuted as a dramatist, his work being included in two anthologies of young Romanian theater. The first among these writings is the 1995 Lecție. Sau ceva de genul acesta ("A Lesson. Or Something like That"), first performed in 2002 by Bucharest's Green Hours fringe theater under the name of Cu cuțitul la os ("A Knife Cut to the Bone"); the second such text, published in 1996, was called Vinovatul să facă un pas înainte ("Will the Guilty Man Take One Step Forward"). Having made his editorial debut in short story with the 1999 collection Cheta la flegmă, he regularly published new works of fiction and cultural analysis over the following years. Between 2001 and 2002, he took over as editor in chief of Timpul.

In 2003, Lungu published three books of essays on literary theory and microsociology, titled respectively Povestirile vieții. Teorie și documente ("Life Stories. Theories and Documents"), Construcția identității într-o societate totalitară. O cercetare sociologică asupra scriitorilor ("The Construction of Identity in a Totalitarian Society. A Sociological Study on Writers") and Cartografii în tranziție. Eseuri de sociologia artei și literaturii ("Transitional Cartographies. Essays of Art and Literary Sociology"). Also that year came a second work in drama, Nuntă la parter ("Wedding on the Ground Floor"), and a reprint of Cheta la flegmă under the title of Proză cu amănuntul ("Retail Prose"), which also featured a dossier of critical commentary from all sides of the literary scene and an account of his visit to Transnistria, a breakaway region of Romania's neighbor Moldova, governed as an unrecognized state. They were followed in 2004 by the novel Raiul găinilor. A second volume of short stories, titled Băieți de gașcă (Romanian for both "Boys in a Gang" and "Good Fellows"), saw print in 2005. After joining fellow Club 8 member Gheo in authoring a study of social history and microsociology, investigating impact of communist rule on Romanian women, published in 2008 as Tovarășe de drum. Experiența feminină în comunism ("Female Fellow Travelers. Female Experience under Communism"), Lungu returned to fiction with the 2009 novel Cum să uiți o femeie ("How to Forget a Woman").

A resident of Iași, Dan Lungu is married and the father of two. One of the first authors from the post-Revolution period to collect a steady profit from literary contributions, he invested his money into a chalet on the outskirts of Iași. He visited France in 2005, invited by the Belles Etrangères cultural exchange program, and, in 2007, returned as a Writer-in-Residence at the Villa Mont Noir, Marguerite Yourcenar's birthplace. He was twice nominated for the European Commission's Jean Monnet Award for Literature in 2008. The target of much public interest, Sînt o babă comunistă! was considered for a film adaptation by Romanian director Stere Gulea.

As of 2009, Lungu's work had been translated into nine languages, including a critically acclaimed French-language version of Raiul găinilor (Le paradis des poules, Éditions Jacqueline Chambon, 2005). In its Spanish translation, published in 2009, Sînt o babă comunistă! was included by El País daily in a "best of" chart for humorous literature. Also in 2009, a chart compiled by the satirical and lifestyle magazine Academia Cațavencu ranked Lungu 46th among the "50 sexiest Romanian intellectuals". During the 2016 parliamentary election, Lungu ran for and won a seat in the Romanian Senate on the lists of the Save Romania Union. He subsequently left his prior position as director of the Museum of Romanian Literature.

== Style ==
=== Context ===
Ever since his debut in prose, Dan Lungu has drawn attention as a leading figure among a generational wave of prose writers, most of whom published their work with Polirom. Within the Polirom collection, which primarily comprises autofictional works, Lungu's contribution is judged by critic Bianca Burța-Cernat to have been among the "good/interesting/well-written" category. She believes him to be of the same rank as Cezar Paul-Bădescu, Victoria Comnea, Radu Pavel Gheo, Ana Maria Sandu, Cecilia Ștefănescu and Lucian Dan Teodorovici, but below the "very good" category of Petre Barbu, T. O. Bobe, Filip Florian, Florin Lăzărescu, Sorin Stoica and Bogdan Suceavă.

The authentic streak of Lungu's narratives was highlighted by Mihaela Ursa, a literary reviewer for Apostrof magazine, who claimed: "With Dan Lungu, and not just with him, our literature seems to have fortunately parted with the complexes of the genius and that of the masterpiece, moving back closer to the reader." Poet and critic Octavian Soviany notes: "Dan Lungu refuses [...] the monarchic perspective of the demiurge-novelist who always gazes on the world from above [...], for he treats his characters 'from one equal to another', places himself among them, advancing a vision 'from within' which confers upon the narrative some extra authenticity and naturalness." Also according to Soviany, Dan Lungu's prose is connected to "the great Balzacian tradition" and "the masters of the verist short story". Similarly, literary critic Daniel Cristea-Enache argues that Lungu is separated from his generation by the understanding that prose is "in large measure written not for oneself, but for another. For others, the more of them the better." Researcher Cristina Chevereșan sees a special link between the works of Lungu, Florian and Stoica, "epics of life lived in the often suffocating circle of a collectivity as scanty and organically welded as it is oppressive".

In its immediate Romanian context, Lungu's work has occasionally been ranked among "recovery literature" pieces—diverse works which, in the post-censorship era, provide retrospective testimonies or analytical overviews of the communist period. This classification, which places Lungu alongside Petru Cimpoeșu and Ion Manolescu, is, according to critic Cosmin Ciotloș, exaggerated and simplistic: "Personally, I am rather skeptic toward any sort of necessity that is imposed or predictable." Another particularity of Lungu's work involves his local affiliation, connected with the culture of Iași city and the historical region of Moldavia. Cernat, who noted that Lungu has a preference for publishing his work with Iași-based venues, deduced "the strategy of asserting a personal project with several levels, which assigns a certain place to a 'Moldavian' (Iașian) identity". Reportedly, Lungu refused several offers to move into Bucharest, Romania's capital, to which he prefers his adoptive Iași.

=== Neorealism and Postmodernism ===
Dan Lungu himself places stress on his affiliation to a form of Neorealism deemed "microsocial"—that is, primarily concerned with everyday subjects and simple interactions between individuals. His main influences include foreign authors Peter Handke, Michel Houellebecq and Elfriede Jelinek, while his imagery has drawn comparisons with the films of Yugoslavian-born director Emir Kusturica. Lungu has also become one of the Romanian authors best known outside Romania, and, according to literary critic Marius Chivu, one in the rare position of being recommended to a local public with quotes from foreign critics. This notoriety, coupled with the candor of his accounts, has reputedly sparked criticism that Lungu is "ruining Romania's image abroad", which prompted Lungu to state: "I am not a Foreign Ministry employee."

At the same time, Dan Lungu's literary contributions adopt a number of traits which have been defined as postmodern. These aspects include Lungu's parodic take on clichés and commonplace ideas, a process which, according to Ursa, results in "cultural short-circuits". His prose is also placed in connection to the debates surrounding the Postmodern nature of the Optzeciști, writers who debuted a decade before Lungu, but whose contribution is seen as influential on the young literary scene. Lungu is a successor to the Neorealist group among the Optzeciști, and seen by Moldovan literary critic Iulian Ciocan as less indebted to "the Postmodern paradigm". Writing in 2000, Ciocan argued: "Dan Lungu's debut is remarkable because the young writer does not frantically embrace the Postmodern technique and ontology, but uses them only to the measure where they lend more authenticity to his prose." A similar point is made by Cristian Teodorescu, himself one of the Optzeciști, who parallels Lungu's storytelling techniques with those developed before 1989 by Mircea Nedelciu. Commenting on Lungu's relation to a larger historical and stylistic context, Burța-Cernat wrote: "the prose writers of the newer category, the 'social anthropologists', do not aim to reinvent the world by capturing it within fabulous scenarios, but merely to describe it. They operate with a lens, a microscope [...], avid for describing its textures and the most anodyne of its details." This "minimalist" tendency, she noted, falls in line with 1980 authors—Nedelciu, Teodorescu, Sorin Preda, Ioan Groșan—, and also includes Lungu's colleagues Stoica, Teodorovici, Radu Aldulescu, Andrei Bodiu and Călin Torsan. A distinct view is held by Cristea-Enache, who views Dan Lungu as one of the authors who parted with both "the endless ironical games" of the 1980 generation and the "harshness of 1990s naturalism", while avoiding "aesthetic compromise".

According to literary chronicler Bogdan Crețu, a "coherently voiced program" is observable throughout Lungu's work in fiction, and is encapsulated into Lungu's own reference to "retail prose". Dan Lungu acknowledges that his main literary works tend to center each on a particular narrative technique, but recounts that the substance for this technique is only apparent to himself a posteriori. The subtle connection between Lungu's sociological research and his fiction writings has also been discussed by critics Andrei Terian and Paul Cernat. The latter notes: "Dan Lungu is a professional who does not mix his levels: the areas are firmly separated, even if they communicate on the deep level of the overall project."

== Works ==
=== Debut ===
Some of Lungu's earliest published works were poetry pieces which, according to writer Șerban Axinte, do not reach the same standard as his other contributions: "Few still recall that Dan Lungu has debuted as a poet. The Muchii volume [...] no longer communicates much to us, even if [it] does not lack certain several good, intelligent texts, albeit lacking the force and consistency to impose an author." His debut work in short prose, grouped as Cheta la flegmă, is, in Iulian Ciocan's definition, a book about "the prisoners of everyday": a bulldozer operator, an asylum custodian, a thief, a group of soldiers, a child and an unhappy couple. According to critic and journalist Costi Rogozanu: "Under a 'strong' title, Dan Lungu collects the most diverse of prose pieces, some written in the most direct argotic language, others including the most meticulous of traditional lines. [...] The Iași-based writer sets to clearly delimit his area of interest—daily life in the post-Revolution period—, varying with irony the types of writing he uses." The shock value of the title was also noted by Cernat, who concluded that its apparent connection to the "miserabilist" tone of more radical Romanian literature was "rather inadequate". An argument of similar substance was provided by Cristea-Enache. In his view, the stories are "finely written" portraits of people caught in the "post-communist transition", to the "stark setting of 'tower block life' which nevertheless almost completely lacks—bizarrely—the 'consumerist' and pop ingredients of post-communist kitsch."

Ciocan interprets the work's overall perspective as: "Life is a spectacle both tragic and comical [...], into which 'things great and small' are undiscernably mixed together." According to the same critic, a common trait of the characters is their inability of discerning the human condition: "The maximum they are capable of is having the revelation that 'today you are healthy, strong, drinking like a calf and subject to no harm, and tomorrow bam! the finger points! 'You die!', and you die just like that.' Egotistic, insolent, hypocritical characters, but also gentle, jovial, depending on the circumstances. They are incredibly authentic, convincing, owing precisely to their being stuck in the morass of everyday." Cernat proposes: "Just like in the works of his junior Sorin Stoica and those of a few others, one senses in these minute 'stories of life' the pleasure of collecting 'mentality samples'." Some of the book's characters have to deal with circumstances that test their limits: in Buldozeristul, the protagonist uses his machine to bury his wife and daughter after failing to speed up procedures for a proper funeral; an old age pensioner who seduces women while queuing for gas cylinder refills; and, in the eponymous writing, a teenager who is publicly humiliated by having his hands and arms covered in spit.

Commenting on 2008 reprint, Ciotloș argued "a permanently invoked Cheta la flegmă of 1999 has become, four years later, a permanently appreciated Proză cu amănuntul", describing the fragments of reviews collected by Lungu as "unbelievably high". Cernat took a more negative view of the new edition, writing that, while the original stories were still relevant, they "only seems to have been republished in order to complete the author's 'polyvalent' profile". The reportage piece detailing Lungu's trip to Transnistria notably depicts the preservation of Soviet and communist symbolism throughout the region, the officially sanctioned imposition of Moldovan Cyrillic even to the point where schoolteachers use it for transliterating French-language texts, and the religious aspects of local sports. According to Ciotloș: "The ideology of the 50s appears to have been frozen here for more than half a century."

The play Nuntă la parter pursues a different path, being structured as an abstract parable: characters known as the Soldiers, isolated from the outside world, are pushed by a commanding voice into performing sinister and absurd acts, including the so-called "wedding on the ground floor", while vaguer exterior sounds provide samples of communist slogans, chanting and, eventually, violence associated with the Revolution. Cernat, who calls the play Lungu's "most vulnerable" work, cites and agrees with the analysis provided by critic Alina Nelega, according to which the text is "a study of a mechanism, rather than a gallery of characters."

=== Povestirile vieții and Construcția identității ===
Povestirile vieții, Lungu's scientific study of 2003, also marks his preoccupation with oral history as a path to investigating Romania's communist past, in particular the 1965-1989 regime of Nicolae Ceaușescu. Paul Cernat commends the work for breaking with the pattern of similar post-1989 recoveries, which mainly focus on interviews with political personalities. In contrast, Lungu's book centers on three study cases from working class environments—Florentina Ichim, Vasile Ariton and Petre Jurescu—whom the regime took pride in claiming were its support base. Their retrospective images of the era vary significantly, fluctuating between nostalgia and virulent anti-communism. However, all three witnesses recall having themselves resorted to alternative and illicit mechanisms of survival or self-promotion, in particular theft and political corruption. In his commentary on the interviews, Lungu concluded that, in some cases, the image of workers' lifestyles as offered by the propaganda apparatus was real, "contrary to our expectations". He added, to Cernat's agreement: "Overturning that which was officially stated during the epoch is not indicative of the real state of things and only drags us down into another ideology [...]. That is why we have said: back to the facts!" In his review of the book, literary critic Dan C. Mihăilescu resonated with such observations, noting their revelatory aspect: "once confronted with the accounts [...], I convinced myself once and for all that the things which, under Ceaușism, I could still believe united us into a solidarity of suffering, are as false as can be. That is, even though we waited in grueling queues, in the same cold, for the same food rations, an ocean existed between the proletariat [...] and the intellectuals, between 'base and superstructure'. We were simply put two worlds, not just figuratively, but also effectively. There was nothing for us to sell and steal, whereas they had access to the circuits of theft, to the web of programmed lawlessness."

With Construcția identității într-o societate totalitară, seen by Cernat as "a study up to the international standards" and a work of "entomological precision", Dan Lungu focuses on how writers and intellectuals related to ideological pressures, explores in particular the theme of "resistance through culture" (as opposed to outspoken dissidence). The thesis advanced by Lungu is that Romania's pre-communist authoritarian traditions accompanied Westernization, and therefore failed to rally the society around the notion of legality. Paraphrasing the author's conclusions, Cernat writes: "The 'voluntarist and elitist' projects of emancipation, the intellectuals' paternalistic Bovarysme, the destruction of the traditional model of the village and the partial assumption of modern values in the urban environment, the weakness of civil society have all facilitated adaptation to the Stalinist and, later, national-communist models [...]. Hence the duplicity, the lack of solidarity among the 'resisters' within a patriarchal, mostly rural, country..." Historian Cristian Vasile sees Lungu's study as akin to the contributions of anthropologist Katherine Verdery, in that it defines the writers' individual roles in "the process of transforming society and creating the new man", while serving as an investigation of social identity constructs. Vasile quotes the book for its conclusions about the impact of agitprop, socialist realism and censorship on Romanian literature and education, including a corroboration of the censors' own dissatisfaction with their activity, or the link Lungu establishes between the spread of atheism and the communist version of science education. A distinct section of the essay refers to the tradition of Jewish Romanian literature, and in particular to the Jewish impact on modernist literature. In his review of the chapter, Cernat discussed the "relevant—if at times exaggerated—conclusions" Lungu draws on minority authors having been pushed by their social marginalization into becoming the cultural avant-garde. In Cernat's view, Construcția identității... "imposes itself through span, seriousness and an irreproachable professionalism", but suffers from "a savant jargon which limits [its] reception to the circle of specialists."

=== Raiul găinilor ===
With Raiul găinilor, Lungu's extends his focus on the provincial and suburban environments into novel form. The book, written over one summer, carries the subtitle "A faux novel of rumors and mysteries" and is defined by its author as a work on "the circulations of rumors". Its heroes are feeble men and women who interpret the larger world based on things that occur in their immediate vicinity, Acacia Street. The narrative borrows from the conventions of the frame story, and, Terian notes, owes direct inspiration to Hanu Ancuței, an interwar volume by the classic Romanian author Mihail Sadoveanu. While Terian believes Raiul găinilor to be primarily calm and distant, his colleague Mircea Iorgulescu, who prefaced the work, argued: "Under a benign and slow-going appearance, the novel's world is actually terrifying. It lives mechanically, though automatisms which provide it with a kind of demented functioning, similar to one of the characters, a woman who endlessly knits pullovers without watching her own hands." One fragment which drew critical attention is that in which the humble Milică, who has once been allowed into the house of the reclusive, imposing and envied Colonel, embellishes the account of its luxurious standards in order to captivate his peers. Similarly, the mythomaniacal factory worker Mitu obsesses over his supposed chance encounter with communist leader Ceaușescu. In addition to these topical aspects, the novel fictionalizes professional incompetence, feud, adultery and working class drinking culture. It ultimately deals with the impact of post-Revolution economic transition, reflected in the characters' ambiguous memories of Ponzi schemes, or projected in the account of how the closure of non-lucrative factories prevented the employees from continuing to steal industrial materials. According to Andrei Terian, the book is primarily relevant for the way in the "captivating" and "discreet" narrative supports events of marginal importance, with "the absence of any demonstrative intent" for a defining characteristic. Lungu however recounted having written it with "pleasure, a masochistic pleasure".

Writing in 2005, French reviewer Alexandre Fillon argued that Raiul găinilor proved a "hilarious" read, whose plot "says a lot about the Romania of yesterday and of the present." However, he also wrote that the work "did not receive critical unanimity". In contrast, Terian defines the reaction of Romanian reviews as "virtually unanimous adhesion".

=== Băieți de gașcă ===
Băieți de gașcă, which comprises 11 short stories, is noted for its alternation of purist aesthetics and challenging use of Romanian slang, while its attempt to isolate pieces of the everyday creates a link with reportage. This approach to storytelling is likened by Bogdan Crețu with the prose of Alexandru Monciu-Sudinski, while Cristian Teodorescu connects it with J. D. Salinger's Nine Stories and the poetry of Emil Brumaru. Noting the difficulties of this approach, particularly in those stories which explore the marginal areas of Romanian society, Crețu commends Dan Lungu for opting in favor of first-person narratives written from within, which allow him to preserve the authenticity of uncultured or ungrammatical speech. In Teodorescu's account, the author "grows so close to his characters that he ends up completely inside their skins. He takes the voice of a little girl shocked by the brutality of family life and the promiscuity of life in a block apartment. Or he turns himself into a gang boy and recounts his experiences in argotic language, which does not shy away from any of the words censored out of the latest Dicționarul explicativ al limbii române edition." Daniel Cristea-Enache highlights the individualized use of language and gestures, from the "infantile repetitiousness" characteristic of little girls to the "style of tricky young men", believing these traits to be in line with "the exploitation of orality" by authors such as Sorin Stoica and Ovidiu Verdeș.

While noting that Lungu's Băieți de gașcă stories inherently fail to explore "a more profound vision", Crețu argues: "Dan Lungu [nevertheless] manages to render this shortcoming relative through irresistible comedy: not one of word play [...], but one of situation." The volume's eponymous story thus alternates between the apparent seriousness of gang culture and the obstacles they face as individuals, with episodes such as one gang member's frustrations over his girlfriend's nymphomania. Other sections of the volume strike a different note, and include a fictionalized account the life of a young Englishwoman who decides to settle in Romania. Focusing on Lungu's ability to surprise his readers, Teodorescu commented: "Once in a while, if one does not want to let himself be conquered by his tricks, one may have reactions of mistrust [...] Dan Lungu anticipates this reaction as well and builds up complicity for what he does, like a prestidigitator who, at the same time as jokingly letting you in on how he has made you believe that he was able to cut himself in two, leads you into the fog of the next trick [...]. Whoever carefully reads Dan Lungu gets a free lesson in the manipulation techniques to which all those who wish to have us convinced of the truth in non-literary fiction will expose us without warning and at times successfully." Cristea-Enache, who praised Băieți de gașcă for displaying "natural breathing", "stylistic mobility" and "dexterity", also argued: "When the young prose author will manage to inject more substance into both his stories and novels, we shall have in him a leading exponent of this new-old literature."

=== Sînt o babă comunistă! ===
With the ample first-person narrative Sînt o babă comunistă!, Lungu explores the theme of nostalgia and its pitfalls. Through introspection and flashbacks, the volume depicts the disorientation and anguish of Emilia (Mica) Apostoae, an aging woman whose longing for the childhood and youth she spent under the communist regime make her block out negative memories of the period. According to Mihaela Ursa, the novel builds on two "extremely productive" sources, "literature about childhood (fed by the tremor of retrospection) and the literature of 'the innocent' (of picaresque extraction)." In Soviany's view, the text recalls the works of Moldovan author Vasile Ernu and elements from classic works in Romanian literature (from Ion Creangă's Childhood Memories to Marin Preda's Moromeții), while Axinte believes it a synthesis of Lungu's own narrative techniques, seeping into "a kind of discourse objectification that has rarely been frequented in recent times." Ciotloș places stress on the work's reworking of communist stereotypes. He argues that Emilia Apostoae's early biography, in particular her migration from village to urban center, assimilates a theme from socialist realism ("the prose works produced and expired during the 1950s"), while the aspects of narrative language incorporate the diverse avatars of speech under ideological pressure, from the "parental and always costly discussions" confronting politically appointed supervisors and their nonconformist employees to subversive forms of Romanian humor and the "wooden tongue" of official speeches. Spread out between these fragments of authentic speech are Lungu's own observations, which prompt Ciotloș to argue: "[...] this is where [the novel's] originality can be found, in the rare moments when he decides to intervene. When he blocks out the verbal stream to produce a funny remark, when he stretches a joke over several chapters, when, instead of diacritics, he places on the cover a majestic and Soviet five-cornered star."

The narrative hook in Sînt o babă comunistă! is provided by Emilia's attempt to define her political convictions, after being questioned by her daughter, Alice. The content Emilia finds in juxtaposing communism and the happier moments of her life, peaking into episodes of utopianism, are seen as observation-based attempts to characterize an entire generation of Romanians. Emilia's erroneous train of thought becomes apparent in episodes where she recalls her employment at a state-owned factory. Her ideal, Ursa notes, is actually that of an "anti-world", where negative values are made to look positive: "work before the lunch break, so that one could slack off afterward [...], 'creative' solutions for increasing productivity, generalized theft ('there was enough to steal from'), painting fir trees green when a visit by Ceaușescu was due, the presence of a good-natured man who traded in political jokes (the assigned informer, as it would turn out)." The constant movement between "before" and "after", Soviany notes, follow "the pendulum principle", serving to illustrate Emilia's sense of time and the experience of change as nauseating. The object of the novel, according to the critic, is comparable to the scope of a Bildungsroman: "[Sînt o babă comunistă!] becomes the book about the female protagonist's transition from the infantile and paradise-like stage [...] toward reflection and doubt, therefore toward maturity." The importance of this transformation to the plot is also discussed by Axinte, who argues that its revelations compensate for the fact that the novel "does not provide anything new (as information and biographical document) for those born and bred under communism." Cosmin Ciotloș sees the manner in which Lungu "tames with candor" the elements of a communist-style biography as "socialist realism redeeming itself on the last stretch of the race", stripped of conventions to become "purebred sociological realism". In Lungu's own definition, the book is built around "the decision process blueprint, where pros and cons confront themselves in the present, while invoking their timely roots."

=== Tovarășe de drum ===
Tovarășe de drum, the oral history collection coordinated by Lungu and his colleague Radu Pavel Gheo in 2008, groups together the testimonies of 17 intellectual women with various social backgrounds, all of whom reflect back on totalitarian pressures. The list mostly includes professional writers, among them Adriana Babeți, Carmen Bendovski, Rodica Binder, Adriana Bittel, Mariana Codruț, Sanda Cordoș, Nora Iuga, Simona Popescu, Iulia Popovici, Doina Ruști and Simona Sora. According to Bianca Burța-Cernat, the study, part of a "war on silence", falls in line with earlier contributions in this field—particularly those of Gabriel Horațiu Decuble, Doina Jela and Tia Șerbănescu. Marius Chivu also underlines their subject's proximity to Cristian Mungiu's award-winning film 4 Months, 3 Weeks and 2 Days. The narratives often focus on the presence and use of mundane objects, from Western contraband items such as condoms and fragrance, to monopoly products of the state economy.

Among the diverse accounts in Tovarășe de drum, Burța-Cernat singles out those of Babeți, who recalls the importance tote bags had for her family during two decades of communism, and Bittel, who speaks about the ideal female cook, as "the queen of sarmale". She is however critical of the fact that such a contribution was initiated by men, arguing that this impinges on its merits: "given the way in which they write here, the ladies invited to partake in this collective project leave the impression that they are striving to fall in line with the rules of a game, [...] to confirm [...] the already consolidated idea about them: the idea of difference—much too essentialist (and it is biological essentialism that is involved here)—, the idea that [...] they see the world, politics included, different from humanity's masculine majority." As part of this comment, she also argues that the book is excessively indebted to concrete economic aspects which women found especially challenging, whereas the "generically human" intellectual needs are "placed in brackets". Chivu, who saw the work as fluctuating between the seriousness of Ruști's account and Babeți's humorous recollection, believed Simona Popescu's contribution, which describes communist experience as "laughing out of pity", to be "the most balanced". In reference to the entire text, and in particular accounts of the ban on abortion, he argues: "all [its] female authors fundamentally speak about the same thing: the torment of being a woman, between the frustration of having one's intimacy forbidden and the efforts of illicit femininity." Babeți's account was also viewed with interest by journalist Florentina Ciuverca, who also drew attention to Ruști's story about how, despite the official campaign against abortion, a doctor preemptively subjected her to curettage over a case of vaginal bleeding.

=== Cum să uiți o femeie ===
Written during Lungu's stay at the Villa Mont Noir, Cum să uiți o femeie is the story of Andi, an investigative journalist employed by a seedy newspaper, covering the period after his lover Marga decides to leave him unannounced. Lungu, who likens the volume's technique with a Möbius strip and a "psychological zoom", focuses on his protagonist's subsequent dismay, showing him as both character and narrator, while detailing his series of failed love affairs and his conclusion that Magda had never loved him. A secondary element in the plot recounts Andi's tightening bond with his landlord, the Adventist preacher Set, a process illustrated by dialogues which evolve between proselytism and compassion. According to Marius Chivu, the relationship between Set and Andi is "the novel's consistent part" and a "tour de force", owing to "the natural manner and the authenticity with which [Lungu] recomposes the missionary and religious message." Chivu concludes: "Set is the actual character in this (elegantly written, but lacking in stylistic pretensions) novel, having, overall, enough pathos for a subject far more delicate than love for a woman, that is the love for one's neighbor. For some readers, this may mean very much." According to critic and writer Ovidiu Șimonca, Cum să uiți o femeie is "tight, ambitious, inciting", but the story line "is wrapped in too many outside details".

The author himself compared Cum să uiți o femeie with Sînt o babă comunistă!, noting that it was the first of his works to be completely separated from the memory of communism. He specified feeling "intoxicated" by his earlier themes and having an explicit wish was to create "a one hundred percent romance novel", arguing: "It was much harder for me to write about the world of Neoprotestantism than from a feminine perspective." He added having felt "a vague and persistent fear that there were mistakes to be made with each step [of the writing process]", explaining: "This being a setting relatively unknown to me, it was easily conceivable that I could have missed or inadequately placed significant details. I was also obsessed with the fear of not offending, not carelessly hurting the dignity of a religious minority. I did not write these articles so as to vilify the born again, to perpetuate all sort of stereotypes about them, but to understand them and to create a powerful character, as I would hope is the case with presbyter Set [...]." Lungu also mentioned having learned to discard his own preconceptions about minority religions, and recounted having asked a pastor to verify the narrative as one from inside the religious phenomenon.

Answering to objections about the lack of focus on the central love affair, he commented: "It is, most of all, a novel about memory: what happens to memory and how it restructures itself after a sentimental fracture in one's biography. Things are not very clear-cut, there is no single narrative in one's resurrecting memory, there is a passage from one zone to another, things are slippery, subtle, nuanced. [...] Memory is like an onion that, when peeled, only grows bigger." He added that the novel could be read as the antithesis between the daily and the eternal: Andi's place of employment ("the newspaper") and the object of Christian reverence ("the Bible").
