= Radu Pavel Gheo =

Romanian fiction writer and essayist

- Born: Pavel Gheorghiță Radu; October 3, 1969 (age 57); Oravița, Romania
- Occupations: Novelist; short story writer; essayist; translator (from English)
- Writing career
- Period: 1993–present
- Genres: Realist; satire; parable; essay
- Movements: Neorealism; Postmodernism

Pavel Gheorghiță Radu (Romanian pronunciation: [ˈpavel ɡe̯orˈɡitsə ˈradu]; born October 3, 1969), known by the pseudonym Radu Pavel Gheo (Romanian: [ˈradu ˈpavel ˈɡe.o]), is a Romanian fiction writer and essayist. Gheo is a member of PEN Club from Romania (since 2005) and of the Romanian Writers' Union (since 2003).

== Biography ==
Gheo was born in Oravița, Caraș-Severin County. He graduated from the West University of Timișoara, Faculty of Letters, in 1994, and holds a Ph.D. in Philology from the same institution (2014). He taught English language for five years in Timișoara and, later on, in Iași. Between 1999 and 2001 he worked as a radio editor for Radio Iași. Gheo was a member of the Romanian young writers' group CLUB 8 from Iași, together with Constantin Acosmei, Șerban Alexandru, Radu Andriescu, Michael Astner, Emil Brumaru, Mariana Codruț, Gabriel Horațiu Decuble, Florin Lăzărescu, Dan Lungu, Ovidiu Nimigean, Dan Sociu and Lucian Dan Teodorovici. Afterwards, he lived for a year in the American city of Bellevue, Washington, whence he returned to Timișoara, where he currently lives.

== Literary activity ==
Gheo has published so far several volumes of short stories, essays, and two novels. He is also the author of a play entitled Hold-УП Akbar sau Toti în America (Hold-УП Akbar or Everybody in America). The play has been put on stage by the National Theatre "Mihai Eminescu" from Timișoara, starting July 2007. He has published several hundred essays and studies in some of the major cultural magazines from his country and in some cultural magazines from abroad: Timpul, Dilema (veche), 22, Orizont, Observator cultural, Lettre International, Amphion, Korunk, Wienzeile (Vienna, Austria), Dialogi (Maribor, Slovenia), Sarajevo Notebooks (Sarajevo, Bosnia), Libertatea (Vojvodina, Serbia) Au Sud de l’Est (Paris, France), Lampa (Warsaw, Poland), Herito (Kraków, Poland), Courrier Internationale (France), Cultures d’Europe Centrale (France) etc. He has also been included in several literary anthologies from Romania and abroad, with short stories or essays. As a translator from English, he has translated around twenty volumes, mostly fiction.

=== 2003 – Farewell, My Homeland, Farewell ===
Upon his return from the United States in Romania, Gheo published in 2003 Adio, adio, patria mea, cu î din i, cu â din a (approx. Farewell, My Homeland, Farewell...), a description of the United States from an immigrant's perspective, and a book where "the critical eye that demoted Romania also demotes America". The Romanian essayist and literary critic Mircea Iorgulescu appreciated it as "an entirely amazing book in the contemporary Romanian literature... It should compete simultaneously for the title The Book of the Year in many categories: essay, journalism, fiction, even poetry, as long as Gogol’s Dead Souls is a poem".

=== 2010 – Good Night, Children! ===
The topic of immigration is also approached in Gheo's 2010 novel Noapte bună, copii! (Good Night, Children!). The novel deals with the childhood spent in the Romanian Communist regime, where the children's imagination is suffused with the obsession of an idealized Western world. As the obsession grows, the main characters risk their lives in an illegal border crossing. The literary critic Daniel Cristea-Enache defined Noapte bună, copii! as "the novel of a generation", the generation of the so-called "decreței". The novel was translated in Italian (La Zisa, Palermo, 2016) and Spanish (Tres Hermanas, Madrid, 2020).

=== 2016 – Disco Titanic ===
Disco Titanic is a novel centered upon a teenager growing up in the communist Romania, while dreaming of Tito's Yugoslavia. In 2010 Vlad Jivan is the owner of a small, but lucrative publishing house from Timișoara. His teenage golden memories include a seven-day trip in the former Yugoslavia, in Split, during the summer of 1989, where he made friends among the locals, fell in love with a young Croatian girl and, eventually, was involved in a horrible deed. After 21 years, upon his return to Split (now in Croatia), he meets his old friends, physically and spiritually maimed by the Yugoslavian wars. His former flame, Marina, is married, while her brother, Renato, died in the first Croatian war (Domovinski Rat). Moreover, all of them are still haunted by their brutal actions from 1989 and afterwards, and are doomed to pay for it. The novel was very well received both by critics and the general public. Bogdan-Alexandru Stănescu considered it, "above all, an exploration of a lost world... transfigured through by the main charactersʼ nostalgia into a lost Paradise: the former Yugoslavia". In the same vein, Alina Purcaru appreciated that "Disco Titanic has its place in the short list of the most complete and most penetrating novels of this period", calling it "a brilliant novel". Also, in an extended review of the book Paul Cernat calls Disco Titanic "a heavyweight novel, one of the most intense that were written here in the last two decades, a visionary and destabilizing novel about a world falling apart and the disappearance of a set of collective illusions". Mihai Iovănel points out that, "in a way, Disco Titanic is a sequel to Good Night, Children! (2010)... After the revisionist fantasy masterpiece Fairia (2004) and the extraordinary Good Night, Children!, Disco Titanic is Radu Pavel Gheoʼs third unmissable contribution to the contemporary Romanian literature". Disco Titanic was shortlisted for all the major Romanian literary prizes. In April 2017 it received Observator cultural National Award for Fiction. The novel was also declared Book of the Year 2016 by the cultural magazine Tiuk!. In 2021 it appeared in Serbian translation at Partizanska knjiga (Kikinda, Serbia).

== Bibliography (Romanian works) ==
- Valea Cerului Senin (The Valley of the Clear Blue Sky), Athena, 1997 (short stories).
- Despre science fiction (On Science Fiction) – Omnibooks Satu-Mare, 2001, 1st edition; Tritonic, Bucharest, 2007, 2nd edition (literary studies).
- Adio, adio, patria mea, cu î din i, cu â din a (approx. Farewell, My Homeland, Farewell...), Polirom, 1st edition – 2003, 2nd edition – 2004, 3rd edition – 2013 (essays).
- Românii e deștepți (Romanians IS Smart), Polirom, 1st edition – 2004, 2nd edition – 2006, 3rd edition – 2014 (essays).
- Fairia – o lume îndepărtată (Fairia – A Land Faraway), Polirom, 1st edition – 2004, 2nd edition – 2016 (novel).
- DEX-ul și sexul (DEX and sex), Polirom, 1st edition – 2005, 2nd edition – 2016 (essays).
- Radu Pavel Gheo, Dan Lungu (eds.) – Tovarășe de drum. Experiența feminină în comunism (Fellow Travellers. The Feminine Experience in Communism), Polirom, 2008 (collection of essays).
- Numele mierlei (The Name of the Blackbird), Polirom, 2008 (short stories).
- Noapte bună, copii! (Good Night, Children!), Polirom, 1st edition – 2010, 2nd edition – 2017 (novel).
- Disco Titanic, Polirom, 2016 (novel).
- Un drum cu Ceapă, Polirom, 2020 (short stories).
- Nouvelles de Roumanie, (collective short story anthology), Éditions Magellan & Cie, 2024

== Translations ==
- Fake, in the anthology Sharp Sticks, Driven Nails, ed. Philip O Ceallaigh, The Stinging Fly Publishing House, Dublin, Ireland, 2010
- Lijepa naša and Pripreme za svadbu, in the anthology Nabokov u Brašovu. Antologija rumunjske postrevolucionarne kratke priče, ed. Marina Gessner, Luca-Ioan Frana, Ivana Olujić, Meandar Publishing House, Zagreb, 2010
- Radu Pavel Gheo, Dan Lungu (eds.), Compagne di viaggio. L'esperienza femminile nel comunismo (transl. Anita Bernacchia, Mauro Barindi, and Maria Luisa Lombardo), Sandro Teti Editore, Roma, 2011
- Radu Pavel Gheo, Buona notte, bambini! (Italian transl. Mauro Barindi; Maria Luisa Lombardo), La Zisa, Palermo, 2016
- Radu Pavel Gheo, Dulces sueños, queridos niños (Spanish transl. Marian Ochoa de Eribe), Tres Hermanas, Madrid, 2020
- Radu Pavel Gheo, Disko Titanik (Serbian transl. Ljubinka Perinac-Stankov), Partizanska knjiga, Kikinda, 2021
- Radu Pavel Gheo, Disko Titanic (German transl. Gundel Große, Miruna Bacali), Klak Verlag, Berlin, 2024

== Titles and awards ==
- Romanian Writers’ Association (Timișoara) Award for Adio, adio, patria mea cu î din i, cu â din a – 2003;
- "Pro-Cultura Timisiensis" Award for Cultural Merits, granted by the Timiș County Council – 2005;
- Romanian Writers’ Association (Timișoara) Award for DEX-ul si sexul – 2006;
- Excellence in Arts, title granted by Timișoara City Council – August 2007;
- Romanian Writers' Association Award for English translations Ernest Hemingway, The Old Man and the Sea – May 2008;
- "Eminescu-1868-Oravița" Award for the novel Noapte bună, copii! – January 2011;
- National Fiction Award "Ziarul de Iași" for the novel Noapte bună, copii! – April 2011;
- Romanian Writers’ Association (Timișoara) Award for the novel Noapte bună, copii! – November 2011;
- 2010 Best Romanian Novel, title granted by the cultural magazine Tiuk! for the novel Noapte bună, copii! – November 2011;
- Observator cultural National Award for Fiction for the novel Disco Titanic – March 2017;
- 2016 Book of the Year, title granted by the cultural magazine Tiuk! for the novel Disco Titanic – September 2017;
- Romanian Writers’ Association (Timișoara) Award for the novel Disco Titanic – December 2017;
