= Mircea Nedelciu =

Romanian writer (1950–1999)

- Born: November 12, 1950; Fundulea, Călărași County, Romanian People's Republic
- Died: July 12, 1999 (aged 48); Bucharest, Romania
- Resting place: Bellu Cemetery, Bucharest
- Education: University of Bucharest
- Occupations: novelist, short story writer, journalist, librarian
- Writing career
- Period: 1970–1999
- Genres: autobiography, autofiction, Bildungsroman, collaborative fiction, docudrama, dystopia, erotic literature, essay, fantasy, historical novel, metafiction, satire, science fiction
- Movements: Optzeciști, Postmodernism, Neorealism, Minimalism

Mircea Nedelciu (Romanian pronunciation: [ˈmirtʃe̯a neˈdeltʃju]; November 12, 1950 – July 12, 1999) was a Romanian short-story writer, novelist, essayist and literary critic, one of the leading exponents of the Optzeciști generation in Romanian letters. The author of experimental prose, mixing elements of conventional narratives with autofiction, textuality, intertextuality and, in some cases, fantasy, he placed his work at the meeting point between Postmodernism and a minimalist form of Neorealism. This approach is illustrated by his volumes of stories and his novels Zmeura de cîmpie ("Raspberry of the Field"), Tratament fabulatoriu ("Confambulatory Treatment"), and by Femeia în roșu ("The Woman in Red"), a collaborative fiction piece written together with Adriana Babeți and Mircea Mihăieș.

A follower of trends in avant-garde literature of the 1960s and 1970s, Nedelciu co-founded the literary circle Noii ("The New Ones") with Gheorghe Crăciun, Gheorghe Ene, Ioan Flora, Gheorghe Iova, Ioan Lăcustă, Emil Paraschivoiu, Sorin Preda and Constantin Stan. His integration as an authoritative voice on the Postmodern scene, inaugurated by his presence in the Desant '83 anthology, was complemented by his free-minded attitude and drifter lifestyle. Although Nedelciu's political nonconformism pitted him against the repressive communist system on several occasions, he stood out on the literary scene for adapting to some communist requirements in order to get his message across. This tendency made Nedelciu the target of controversy.

The final years of Mircea Nedelciu's life witnessed his publicized struggle with Hodgkin's lymphoma, which shaped the themes in his unfinished novel, Zodia Scafandrului ("Sign of the Deep-sea Diver"). Although the rhythm of his activity slowed under the pressures of infirmity and major surgery in French clinics, Nedelciu continued his involvement with the literary scene, as both cultural promoter and polemicist, until shortly before his death. His critical posterity is sharply divided on issues surrounding the importance of his work, between those who primarily view him as an eccentric figure and those who describe him as one Romania's major experimental writers.

== Biography ==
=== Early life ===
Nedelciu was born in the semi-urban locality of Fundulea, Călărași County, where his parents, Ștefan and Maria, worked in agriculture (Nedelciu's father was also employed by the House of Savings, a state-run bank). The couple's resistance to forced collectivization had engendered political repercussions, and impacted on the family's standing: Nedelciu's older sister was expelled from university for one year. The family was also periodically harassed by the communist authorities after their son-in-law decided to cross the Iron Curtain, settling in the United States.

Mircea Nedelciu attended primary school in his native town and high school in Brănești, and afterward left for the national capital of Bucharest, in order to complete his studies. A student at the University of Bucharest's Faculty of Letters, specializing in English and French, Nedelciu was attracted into bohemian, cosmopolitan and countercultural circles, growing his hair long and informing himself on new developments in Western culture. His time as a student overlapped with an episode of liberalization which coincided with the early rule of Nicolae Ceaușescu, and which, as Nedelciu himself recalled, provided young intellectuals with access to cultural items that were less known or were recovering from official censorship. These included texts Nedelciu read in the University Library: the French journal Tel Quel and the works of Mikhail Bulgakov, William Faulkner, John Dos Passos, and J. D. Salinger. Nonconformism also impacted on his student life: reportedly, he only attended courses which he found interesting, neglecting all others.

Nedelciu was especially close to his colleague and campus roommate Gheorghe Crăciun and to painter Ion Dumitriu, and vacationed in Crăciun's native Brașov County. It was also during his time in college that he helped found Noii, which in its original form also comprised Flora and "the three Gheorghes" (Crăciun, Ene, Iova). The club was later joined by Lăcustă, Paraschivoiu, Sorin Preda, and Stan. Noii, which for a while published an eponymous student magazine, survived both its members' graduation and the national communist backlash inaugurated by the July Theses of 1971, but remained marginal on the literary scene, and discreetly reacted against the new restrictive guidelines by cultivating difference. According to Nedelciu's own recollection: "In all these years down to 1980, the club was a literary life completely separated from the official literary life."

After completing his studies in 1973 and turning down a post-graduate assignment at a school in the remote Danube Delta, Nedelciu went through several jobs, including that of tour guide for foreigners. According to literary historian Sanda Cordoș, his refusal of initial employment exposed him to the political regime's suspicion for "parasitism". Nedelciu was however able to publish his first literary piece, the short story Un purtător de cuvânt ("A Spokesman"), hosted by a Luceafărul magazine issue of 1977.

=== Rise to prominence ===
The young author's standing declined further later that year, when he was briefly held under arrest for handling foreign currency (a criminal offense at the time). This time inspired him to write another story, Curtea de aer ("The Air Court"), also printed by Luceafărul in the following period. He ultimately found stable employment soon after his release, when he began working as a librarian on the staff of Cartea Românească publishing house (where his first works in literature were to be printed over the following years). As Cordoș argued, the institution "would become legendary as a meeting place for young writers from Bucharest and out of town—political rather than literary marginals." A similar statement is made by literary historian and reviewer Alex Ștefănescu, who sees the writer's activities as responsible for making the library "a sui generis literary club". Also according to Cordoș, Nedelciu was still being subject to political pressures for his family connections and his refusal to join the Romanian Communist Party.

With his 1979 volume of short stories, Aventuri într-o curte interioară ("Adventures in an Interior Courtyard"), Nedelciu became a notorious figure among young authors, and earned the Writers' Union annual prize for debut. He was by then also affiliated with Junimea, a workshop and literary society named after its 19th-century predecessor and hosted by the influential critic Ovid Crohmălniceanu. Nedelciu followed up on his writing with the short story volumes Effectul de ecou controlat ("The Controlled Echo Effect") of 1981 and Amendament la instinctul proprietății ("Amendment to the Proprietary Instinct") of 1983. Owing to Crohmălniceanu's patronage, his prose works were published as part of the critically acclaimed Desant '83 anthology, which set the tone for Optzeciști writings. From this moment on until his death, Nedelciu was at the forefront of debates opposing the Optzeciști to their older colleagues, and stood among those members of his generation who willingly accepted to be called "Postmodernists". A separate and enduring controversy, involving Nedelciu's apparent endorsement of the repressive regime, was sparked in 1982. That year, he signed a lampoon piece targeting anti-communist exiles who broadcast clandestinely into Romania by means of Radio Free Europe, and had it published in Scînteia Tineretului (or SLARS), the mouthpiece of Communist Youth and branch of the main official party newspaper, Scînteia.

Zmeura de cîmpie, Tratament fabulatoriu and the new short prose grouping Și ieri va fi o zi ("And Yesterday Will Be Another Day"), published in 1984, 1986, and 1989, respectively, were Nedelciu's last volumes to emerge in print before the 1989 Revolution. The former was published by the Romanian Army's specialized venue, Editura Militară, which commentators have considered slightly unusual, ultimately tying the decision to the text's oblique mentions of World War II. First issued in 1990, Femeia în roșu was co-written with Anglicist Mircea Mihăieș and comparatist Adriana Babeți. A best seller, it went through a second edition in 1997.

A second revised edition of Tratament fabulatoriu came in 1996. The following year, Femeia în roșu was turned into an eponymous film, directed by Mircea Veroiu. It was also at that stage that Nedelciu began collecting his essays of criticism, grouped in the 1994 anthology Competiția Continuă. Generaţia '80 în texte teoretice ("The Race Goes On: the Eighties Generation in Theoretical Texts"). In 1996, Nedelciu was involved in the open debate organized by the Writers' Union magazine România Literară and critic Nicolae Manolescu, whose purposes were defining the nature and expectations of Romanian Postmodernism and allowing its representatives a reply to criticism. A section of the debate opposed Nedelciu to the younger writer Ion Manolescu, the latter of whom had objected to the supposed Optzeciști monopoly on Postmodernist terminology while arguing that a more genuine manifestation of the current was to be found in the emerging forms of electronic literature. Nedelciu also contributed to Dan Petrescu and Luca Pițu's 1998 anthology of erotic literature, Povestea poveștilor generației '80 ("The Tale of the Tales of the 80s Generation").

=== Final years ===
The final decade of Nedelciu's life witnessed his struggle with Hodgkin's disease, a rare type of lymphoma with which he was diagnosed in 1988, and which severely impaired his motor skills. His treatment involved difficult surgery, performed with French assistance; in 1995, he was subject to a bone marrow autograft, carried out in Romania with additional help from Marseille's Paoli-Calmettes Institute. Although he eventually became reliant on a wheelchair, Nedelciu continued to be active on the literary scene, both through his involvement with the Writers' Union and his founding of Euromedia, a Franco-Romanian company specialized in distributing literature. He also briefly served as editor of Contrapunct, a magazine launched by the Optzeciști, and, after accusing the Writers' Union of "Stalinism", joined other disgruntled authors in creating the Association of Professional Writers. Late in his life, he also presided over the initiative to monitor book circulations, setting up the external auditor program Topul naţional de carte ("National Book Rankings"). His output was much reduced and his ability to write altogether threatened, but he was still working on Zodia Scafandrului, his final contribution to literature.

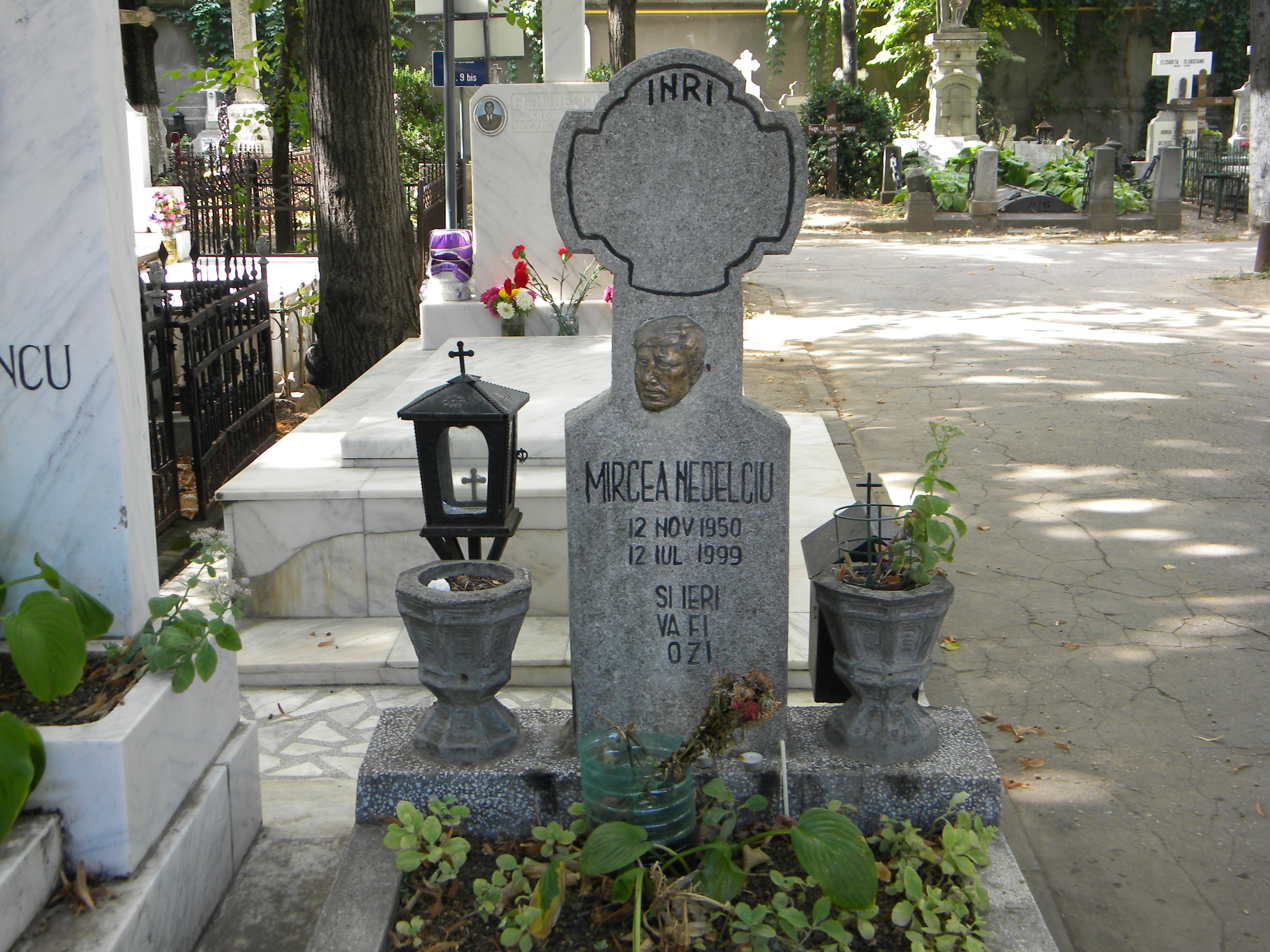
Grave of Mircea Nedelciu at Bellu Cemetery

After a 1996 treatment session in France, Nedelciu was informed that his life expectation depended on procedures which cost 70,000 American dollars—a sum described by Nedelciu himself as "huge". Commenting on these developments, he indicated having resolving not to accept either "capitulation" or "the solution of humiliation", and declared himself optimistic about the possibility of collecting funds in dignity. His efforts were supported by the literary community, who organized a series of fundraisers, the collection being supplemented by government authorities. In late 1997, Nedelciu applied for a visa in order to get treatment in France, but it was not granted. This prompted indignation on the Romanian literary scene, and press campaigns criticizing the French Embassy in Bucharest. In November of that year, while participating in the Gaudeamus Book Fair, Nedelciu was able to collect the endorsement of various local cultural personalities for his own manifesto, which demanded "freedom of movement throughout Europe for those who are in need of it". The French authorities eventually rescinded their decision, and the writer left for Marseille, where he underwent an intervention to improve his mobility.

Mircea Nedelciu died on July 12, 1999, and was buried at Bellu Cemetery two days later. His tombstone bears the title of one of his books, "And Yesterday Will Be Another Day". In a short memoir of the event, his Noii colleague Stan commented on the "subtle irony" of his burial having taken place on Bastille Day, France's national celebration.

== Work ==
=== Cultural positioning ===
Throughout his career, Nedelciu was a prominent exponent of experimental literature, metafiction and autofiction. Inside Noii, he reportedly cut the figure of an innovator, a promoter, and the club member most interested in literary theory. This verdict was partly backed by Alex Ștefănescu, who remarks: "Like other authors from his generation, Mircea Nedelciu took care to define himself his own manner of writing, before literary critics did". According to critic Adina Dinițoiu, the period of "theoretical effervescence", in which Nedelciu assimilated inspiration from diverse sources, was followed by a "growing preoccupation for language." Writing during the second part of his career, Nedelciu reflected back with self-irony: "the writer's childhood diseases are [...] the wish the theorize and the baroque. Which shall the disease of old age be? I do not know. Probably monumentality, classicization!"

Owing to their secondary nature, that of literary tests, Nedelciu's works abound in references and compliments to, as well as borrowings from, various authors. Names critics cite in this context include Romanian classics such as Ion Luca Caragiale, Mateiu Caragiale, Mircea Eliade, and Marin Preda. Nedelciu's narratives were overall significantly indebted to American fiction, and in particular to J. D. Salinger, in whose Catcher in the Rye he reportedly found the first model for his own autofictional style. He is also known to have reworked and blended into his own texts various themes borrowed from Ernest Hemingway. The English-speaking world became the Romanian author's primary cultural reference, and, according to researcher Caius Dobrescu, Nedelciu was one of those "fascinated" with the ideas of Canadian essayist Northrop Frye on "the constant degeneration of the character" in Western literature. His inspiration sources also covered French authors associated with the May 1968 movement. Primarily related to his interest in the textuality and intertextuality techniques of Tel Quel theorists, French echoes are ranked by Dinițoiu as secondary in Nedelciu's work. The author did however make extensive use of constrained writing techniques popularized by France's avant-garde, stating his admiration for the lipograms of Georges Perec. According to a testimonial by his friend Gheorghe Crăciun, Mircea Nedelciu also adopted "action writing"-like techniques, "without prior minute elaboration", displaying "that science of controlling one's own text bear-handed." Diniţoiu also mentions the "passion [...] for exact science" as a distinct trait of Nedelciu's experimentation, accounting for his "stylistic rigor".

Nedelciu equaled his integration into the Desant '83 group with an affiliation to Postmodernism, an interpretation of positioning which came to divide the Optzeciști camp. Mircea Cărtărescu, another member of this faction, referred to his colleague as "the uncontested prose leader of the 1980s", while Mihăieș acknowledged in him "the true leader of our generation, whose rule was naturally acknowledged, indisputable and therefore not at all constrictive." In tandem, author Daniel Cristea-Enache retrospectively referred to Nedelciu as a "Pope of Romanian textualism" whose "strongest asset" was literary theory. The main meeting point between Nedelciu's style and Postmodernist tenets is provided by his attachment to reinterpreting literary conventions, often with the introduction of self-referential material or provoking artistic license.

=== Neorealism and personalized techniques ===
Within the Postmodernist framework, Nedelciu also stood for a minimalist approach to Neorealism, which linked him directly to fellow Optzecişti Ioan Groşan, Cristian Teodorescu and Sorin Preda. For the author himself, Postmodernist-textualist practices and the tradition of literary realism were complementary, in that the former meant "the realism of attitudes toward the real", a conclusion to which he added: "The document, the act, the direct transmission of an event that has actually happened may enter a literary text's economy, where they are no longer 'artistically transfigured' but authenticated [Nedelciu's italics]." According to literary critic Mihai Oprea, who builds his comments on terms introduced by essayist Monica Spiridon, Nedelciu's textualist approach to literature as its own reality actually followed a middle course between "referential verisimilitude, preoccupied with retracing reality" and a "cultural verisimilitude", whose characteristic is "a world of objects already interpreted and ideologically formed by a certain culture." Cristea-Enache also discusses the impact that the interwar Romanian Social Realist Camil Petrescu had on Nedelciu's style, where it resurfaced in an adapted form. Essayist Genţiana Moşneanu, who defines Nedelciu's prose as being dominated by the sense of sight and recurring references to optical instruments, argues: "[His] sight digs into the sordidness of everyday banality in order to present us with samples of reality based on minute facts. All that which resides within the author's field of vision is transmitted to us, the readers, giving us that impression of 'real reality', of real life." In addition to this, she identifies a "kaleidoscope" effect, which subverts the order of realistic details between the levels of each narrative, concluding: "The manner in which Mircea Nedelciu has captured everyday banality leaves the impression of a film based on real fact, where the characters and incidents have been introduced for aesthetic reasons." A similar argument was made by Gheorghe Crăciun, who compared the effect with the "hallucinatory something" of a "film clip", translated as "a world continuously in the making".

For Sanda Cordoș, his short fiction represents "a propitious moment" and a "resurrection" synonymous with "the creative type of the '80s." One of Nedelciu's cogenerationists and friends, critic Ion Bogdan Lefter, also recalled how Nedelciu's personality reflected in his style and choice of subjects, noting the great pauses his colleague would leave between his works, and how "the details of reality which [Nedelciu] would bring into conversation" were casually integrated in later texts. Lefter argued: "[he] was a writer without writing" who "observed and described, lived and retold." Among the narrative techniques setting Nedelciu apart among his generation colleagues was that of so-called "live transmissions", or stories in which the mixture of coherent record and textualist transcript led to an identification with the subject. Another colleague and friend of Nedelciu, Cristian Teodorescu, recalled: "one of these stories was the transcript of a front line diary by a peasant who fought in World War II. I repeatedly asked Nedelciu what the deal was with the peasant's diary. Eventually, he admitted that he only owned a few pages of the diary, that the rest had been lost. Had he filled out the rest? He would not tell me. He knew how to defend the mysteries of his prose, taking shelter behind textualist explanations on 'text generation'." Items of regular life transposed into his prose notably include the phone number of his fellow writer Radu Cosaşu, recorded in one of Nedelciu's prose fragments.

Some commentators attribute Mircea Nedelciu's work with other distinct qualities, stemming from a confrontation of identities: his rural and provincial roots over his adoption by the cosmopolitan Bucharest scene. This issue is reflected in a 2006 statement Crăciun: "He is, after all, a cosmopolitan figure, I could even say a frivolous figure. He runs away from the world to which he belongs, in search of the urban world, but he nevertheless can never part with the former." The claim was supported by Dinițoiu, who argued that Nedelciu's frivolity refers to his "southern" roots in the historical region of Wallachia, which contrasted with and "captivated" the Transylvanian-born Crăciun. In the assessment of Sanda Cordoş, "Nedelciu's freedom of spirit was rooted in peasant culture and the literary life of the city, and he preserved it after graduation in 1973." Such aspects of Mircea Nedelciu's work and biography are reflected in his choice of subjects and underlying themes, listed by Cordoş as "travel, vagrancy and wandering through everyday reality, immediately experienced." The "need for freedom", Dinițoiu argues, is associated in Nedelciu's fiction with "surprisingly romance" love affairs, whose female protagonists "are often on the verge of ideal projection." The narrative is generally laid out as a ceaseless travel, and the often guide-like protagonists seem to suffer their crises only in rare moments of respite. An allusive background to these fictional biographies is provided by the social context: like the author himself, the characters are often uprooted people who relate to historical events as a seminal but mysterious collective trauma. In addition to this element, Crăciun lists the recurring themes of Nedelciu's fiction as "archeology", "meteorology" and "the mechanisms through which nature and the surrounding life exercise pressure on the individual", adding: "Each of these three elements [...] is liable to provoke the distortion of reality, the emergence of strange phenomenons, abrupt changes of life and destiny, the passage from the immediate space into other spaces, at the very least atypical if not fantastical ones." A similar listing of Mircea Nedelciu's main preoccupation was also provided by Lefter.

=== Controversial aspects ===
Together with Cărtărescu and other figures in the Postmodernist group, Nedelciu was a target for criticism, both individual and collective. A synthesis of these objections was provided by literary historian Eugen Negrici. In Negrici's view, the self-referential and ironic works produced by such writers hindered the development of local literature on a more solid basis, and their embrace by the established critics diverted attention from older, classically Modernist authors. He also argued that the group's identification with Postmodernist theses prevented others from doing the same, and that the approximation implied by this process rendered the Postmodern label meaningless.

Another literary historian to issue negative comments on Nedelciu's overall contribution is Alex Ștefănescu. In his view, although being "intelligent and inventive", Nedelciu lacked "artistic sense", displayed "intellectual immaturity", and wrote novels that, unlike his short stories, were "needlessly complicated, clumsy, irrelevant from a literary point of view". Ștefănescu objected in particular to Nedelciu's theory about the need to eliminate "mystification" in prose, commenting that the awareness of conventions was accessible to "every reader", and the contrary effort brought to mind "someone who, storming into a cinema hall, [starts] shouting 'My brothers, don't let yourselves be fooled! That which you see is not reality. These are but images projected on a piece of cloth'." He also challenged Nedelciu's view of self-referential prose was a path to interactivity, arguing that, although the writing process was exposed, the readers' passive role could not be modified: "they can only watch upon the authors' demagogic gesticulation and later conclude that the latter have still pursued their narrative as intended." In Cristea-Enache's view, Nedelciu circulated "sophisms" and "sleight of hand", his target reader being someone who, in order not to seem "tasteless, unintelligent and conservative", claims to have enjoyed writings "without substance, structure or form". In 1995, answering to unfavorable comparisons made between the palpable interactivity of electronic literature on one hand and the theoretical interactivity of pre-1989 prose on the other, Nedelciu accused his rival Ion Manolescu of having created, "out a cocktail of confusions, a thesis supported only by [his] inexplicable enthusiasm".

For Ştefănescu, the nature of language experiments in Mircea Nedelciu's short fiction is not innovative in its recourse to orality, and its techniques of constrained writing affect the personal message—citing his record of the 1977 prison term, which follows a strict pattern of grammatical conjugation. Like Negrici, the critic also reproaches some of his peers having welcomed Nedelciu as an innovator "out of lassitude or snobbery". Similar points were made by essayist Laszlo Alexandru, who claimed that the lionized mainstream of the 1980s and 90s had artificially promoted a "pyramid structure" dominated by Nedelciu as "The Great Prose Writer", Cărtărescu as "The Great Poet" and Lefter as "The Great Critic". This endorsement clashed with the opinion Laszlo shares, according to which Nedelciu "is far from being even an important prose writer". Although highly critical of Alex Ștefănescu's overall views on literature, Laszlo agreed with his verdicts on Nedelciu. Taking his distance from the negative critical revisions, in particular that contributed by Ştefănescu, Crăciun claimed: "The narratological issues posed by Mircea Nedelciu's writing style [...] have been improperly treated—as aspects on their own, isolated from their subjects, situations, characters and contents—[...] because prose experiment in our country is still seen as an extravagant phenomenon, exterior to creation as such, of doubtful value, arousing suspicion when not in fact pejorative labels."

Among the most debated aspects of Mircea Nedelciu's contribution to literature under communism was his theory that writers could evade the pressures of censorship by appealing to subtext, allusions, irony, and other Postmodern mechanisms, while formally adapting themselves to the exterior ideological aspects. According to literary historian Marcel Cornis-Pope, his approach to testing the "prohibitive boundaries" and "foundations of communist reality" relied on exposing the "dogmatic stagnation" through "bolder experimental fiction", of a kind illustrated by other Eastern European authors: Gabriela Adameşteanu, Péter Esterházy, Danilo Kiš, Sławomir Mrożek, Péter Nádas, Toomas Raudam, Piotr Szewc, Dubravka Ugrešić, and Mati Unt. Nedelciu's stance was retrospectively criticized by as illusory, particularly since, even if it allowed the Optzeciști to penetrate the market, it did not prevent the censorship apparatus from viewing Nedelciu personally with suspicion. The theory also scandalized older authors, in particular the dissidents and the openly anti-communist observers from within the Romanian diaspora: Radio Free Europe contributor Monica Lovinescu referred to Nedelciu as a "socialist textualist".

Much debate surrounded the writer's own preface to his Tratament fabulatoriu, which several have read as an endorsement of Nicolae Ceaușescu's regime. Ștefănescu cited its main subject of contention as being the statement that capitalism was inherently hostile toward art, whereas communist states nurtured creativity in order to create a "New Man". According to Laszlo Alexandru, the text enforces the reader's "indignant stupefaction" concerning Nedelciu's promotion by his peers. Such conclusions are contrasted by Nedelciu's own account, provided after the Revolution: he recorded having been engaged in a conflict with censors, and argued that the book itself was about escape from the increased pressures of the 1980s. Mircea Mihăieș recalled that, during the writing process for Femeia în roșu, he had confronted his colleague on the issue of his preface being "annoying and false through its leftism, its opportunistic Marxism", and mentioned having received an enraged justification in response. In parallel to such debates, Nedelciu's 1982 article, defined by Ștefănescu as "vehement and insulting", brought further suspicion of his motives.

=== Debut works ===
With his debut writings, Nedelciu elaborated the generic characteristics of his style, and in particular his choice of subjects. The first of his volumes, Aventuri într-o curte interioară, is also his first account of vagrancy as a lifestyle, showing young abandoned orphans escaping into reverie. The characters of Amendament la instinctul proprietății expand on Nedelciu's reflexions about marginality and aggression: a wanderer, Alexandru Daldea, is gripped by despair, while his female counterpart Dilaré is shown to be suicidal. Another character, Bebe Pîrvulescu, stands for political allusion, being the morally ambiguous son of an officer involved in repression and his cheating wife (whose lover was among those branded "enemies"). A critically acclaimed section of the volume is Provocare în stil Moreno ("Moreno-style Provocation"), called by Dinițoiu a "wonderful prose [which nevertheless] entangles itself in its own meta-textual armor, pressing on its vibration-loaded core." It depicts a physically disabled man, who closely follows the outside world using a pair of binoculars.

The apparent historical novel Zmeura de cîmpie, carrying the subtitle Roman împotriva memoriei ("A Novel against Memory"), tells the story of Zare Popescu, who is engaged on a mysterious quasi-archeological investigation into history. He and all other characters are presumably orphaned drifters who run into each other chaotically while traveling the country—a narrative setting to which Nedelciu adds long fragments of inquires into abstract topics of etymology or cinemaphilia, reflecting the main characters' obsessions. A secondary element is the erotic tension between Zare and Ana, an ambiguous female character who occasionally and mysteriously expresses herself in an ungrammatical version of Romanian with strong influences from Hungarian. Cornis-Pope sees it as representative for the subtle manner in which Nedelciu, like Stan and Adameșteanu, chose to question "ideological representations" and "official myths" present "at the height of Ceaușescu's 'totalitarian absurd' ". He argues: "Zmeura de cîmpie [...] dramatized the difficulties of extricating the culture's 'soul of facts' from official fictions and the totalistic language of the 'tribe'." For Cornis-Pope, this concern is similar to dissenting reportage authors in Communist Poland and the Socialist Federal Republic of Yugoslavia, such as Ryszard Kapuściński and Miško Kranjec. Taking the book's dedication to veterans of Romania's 1944-1945 campaign as her clue, critic Simona Vasilache discusses the text as a generational epic, stressing that the hidden theme is the fate of anti-fascists entrapped by communism. Daniel Cristea-Enache is highly critical of Zmeura de cîmpie, deeming it "weak and indigestible", and opining that the experimental aspects "no longer enable fiction to breathe, but substitute it."

=== Tratament fabulatoriu, Și ieri va fi o zi, and Femeia în roșu ===
Tratament fabulatoriu, the preface of which made Mircea Nedelciu the subject of controversy, is Nedelciu's contribution to the fantasy novel, having for its protagonist the meteorologist Luca, whose work assignment in Temelia ("Foundation") village leads him into a world apparently governed by the rules of Utopian socialism. Like in Zmeura de cîmpie, the small community benefiting from these guidelines finds its preoccupation in historical research: its leader Marius asks his comrades to piece together the career of his supposed ancestor, Neculai Fiston-Gulianu. The plot subsequently focuses on Luca's internal struggles, brought upon by clues that this universe is the design of his own imagination, and culminating in resignation to reality. Within the text are references and stylistic homages to Mateiu Caragiale and his celebrated Craii de Curtea-Veche novel, centered on details in Fiston-Gulianu's biography. The work is punctuated by first-person interrogations, where Nedelciu transforms his narrative mode into a third-level story, where he analyzes his own ability to interpret Luca's feelings.

Mihai Oprea notes the text's ambiguous fluctuation between an actual "Möbius strip" space with "unknown laws" and the imagination of a character "on the verge of autism". In his updated preface of 1996, where he presented his intentions of subverting the communist guideline, Nedelciu explained that his intent was to create "a counter-utopia", sourced by his clandestine readings from George Orwell's Nineteen Eighty-Four, from Elias Canetti's Crowds and Power, and from Michel Foucault's Discipline and Punish. According to Oprea, the work nevertheless fails in its stated ambition of evading the "obsessive-pressuring" world of the late Ceaușescu years: "We are promised the solution of a bitter fight and we are offered a cardboard scenery and wooden swords. We are informed by the sound of trumpets of the retreat into the last redoubt we still can defend (although it can't defend us), and, once we arrive there, we realize that the enemy is a controlled marionette, albeit one masterfully handled by that absolute and pitiless master, the Author." Adina Dinițoiu believes that, contrary to its author's reflections, Tratament fabulatoriu is "Mircea Nedelciu's only fantasy and baroque book"; she also highlights its "mannerist", formalist" and "Bovaryist" characteristics.

Noted within Și ieri va fi o zi, the story Probleme cu identitatea ("Identity Problems") is believed by Cordoș as the "peak" of Nedelciu's short fiction. Subtitled Variațiuni în căutarea temei ("Variations in Search of a Theme"), it merges biographical details with imagined elements, recounting in three different ways the journey of Mureşan Vasile (or Murivale), who travels to Bucharest in order to stand wake for poet Nichita Stănescu. Murivale is, in turn, a worker who quits his job, a deserting soldier and a bankrupt visual artist from Timișoara—avatars which allow Nedelciu to expand on the issue of art in general and, in particular, on that of Timișoara's literary environment. By highlighting the awkwardness in his protagonist's dealing with grief, Probleme cu identitatea also reflects the contrast between the fragile everyday and the magnificence presumed of art. Cordoş concludes: "Life is made of cunning, betrayals, affection and exasperation, marital strife and unexpected complicity, which Nedelciu constructs not in antithesis but in a complementary way so that art will acquire, even in the eyes of petty people, a radiance inexplicable to them." In addition to this piece, the volume includes Primul exil la cronoscop ("The First Chronoscope Exile"), a science fiction-inspired story introducing the deep-sea diving metaphor which would come to fascinate Nedelciu during his final years.

Femeia în roșu, defined by its subtitle as a retro roman ("retro-novel"), is the fictionalized biography of Ana Cumpănaș, a Romanian prostitute who helped capture American gangster John Dillinger. Columbia University academic and literary historian Harold Segel calls it "a curious mixture of docudrama, historical novel, and self-reflective fiction", seeing it as "of particular interest to Americans" among existing pieces of Romanian collaborative fiction. The three authors, who were reportedly following the suggestion of Banat Swabian writer William Totok, based their retrospective account on various sources, including first-hand interviews with people from Comloșu Mare, the village where Cumpănaș originated, resulting in what writer Ana Maria Sandu called "a story that is at the very least as fascinating as that of [...] Dillinger." The subject matter reputedly irritated communist censors, accounting for the fact that Femeia în roșu was published only after the 1989 Revolution.

Beyond the conventional aspects of the narrative, the novel introduces various pieces of experimental prose, whose actual protagonist, critic Simona Sora proposes, is the human body. While respecting formal conventions to the point of including a bibliographical section for the sources consulted, the authors stretch the plot to mention real or imagined details of their own process of researching and writing, or divert it to include episodes about real but not directly relevant personages (such as Canetti and psychoanalyst Sigmund Freud). The focal point and recurring element is autopsy, a procedure in which Sora sees a hidden comment on the very nature of novels: "The rules of a professional autopsy thus become the rules of a novel that is self-aware and aware of literature's (often void) demands." Although she argues that the stated goal of overturning "ancient complexes of the Romanian writer" is left open, Simona Sora sees Femeia în roșu and its "virtuosity" as imposing the autofictional model in front of conventional "artifice".

=== Zodia Scafandrului ===
Nedelciu's unfinished novel, Zodia Scafandrului, is marked by the expectation of death, echoing the final part of its author's life (a period described by Nedelciu's colleague Alexandru Mușina as marked by "generosity, the cult of friendship, a sense of honor and, above all, indifference in the face of death"). Days before dying, the author himself recorded how the expectation had impacted on his writing style: "I know, time now seems to have become very short. It's no longer feasible to put down on paper everything that passes through your mind. You have to make selections, samples. You have to know how to do the opposite of what a tailor does: to measure just once and to cut dozens of times, to discard, to suggest rather than to develop in great detail. But these are things that can be learned." He also commented on the "tricks" his literature had developed in its confrontation with both the threat of death and the debilitating character of his disease: "For example, [describing] in detail a healthy foot, the toes that waggle freely up and down, the mobility of a fine ankle, the play of the shins and thighs in dance—all these things place my hideous adversary in a real crisis of uncertainty. It knows already that my legs belong to it, but I am talking about different legs. There are and will be so many!" Nedelciu also recounted masking his fear of the disease by only referring to it with the euphemism gâlci ("quinsy"). According to both Gheorghe Crăciun and Ion Bogdan Lefter, their friend had a superstition according to which completing his book would accelerate death.

Despite the timely constraints, Nedelciu's original project may have called for Zodia Scafandrului to be the first section of a larger cycle, structured around the yearly cycle of months. Adina Dinițoiu calls attention to the book's "unsettling biographical genre [...] intensely vibrating the chord of a writing style completely lacking in formalism." She ties it to a final development in Nedelciu's literary attitudes, that in which "profundity" was added to his branch of "microrealism", producing "an ethical and even soteriological connotation". In Lefter's view, the book "may be and must be read—I insist: must be read—in various ways." Its nature, he specifies, is that of a "literary and sociocultural project [...] attempting to reach the profound truths in Romania's 20th century universe", but also that of a memoir offering "the sense to a life." The text, having for its protagonist Nedelciu's alter ego Diogene "Dio" Sava, again speaks of its own genesis, notably by referencing a real-life encounter with Scarlat, a diver for the state commercial fleet Navrom and amateur novelist, who reveals to Nedelciu that writing itself may carry the symptoms of disease. Through the themes of diving and disease, the book filtrates satire of communist politics, as Nedelciu explained within the actual text: "this free body of mine, Mediterranean as it is even through the idea of a healthy and harmonious body, perceives this adventure into the deep [...] as an adventure into a much colder land. In short, the mind imagines the deep-sea diver's world and the body refuses it instinctively, viscerally. And for good reason too, given that, in fact, behind the Cousteauesque design, my mind encrypts the adversities (the chill, the frost) of this entire world I'm living in, this symbolic coldness of Romania's communist society in the year 1989, and the body naturally refuses this exile 'up North'." According to Lefter, Nedelciu was actually reworking his notion of layered meanings into the diving metaphor, adapting an earlier interest in the techniques of art restoration (in turned provoked by his discussions with muralist Viorel Grimalschi).

Sava's literary biography reflects his familiarity with interwar society and its upper class, and again portrays Mateiu Caragiale (this time by fictionalizing Caragiale's activities at his property in Fundulea). The impact of communism and collectivization is reflected as a collective tragedy, and the start of an apparent Bildungsroman, depicting the Sava family's encounters with the Securitate secret police, the life of debauchery he leads in order to liberate himself from pressures, and his employment at the Securitate-led Great Institute of History. The latter is a satirical reworking of historiographic practice under communism, the extreme nationalism of the late Ceauşescu years, and the intrusion of pseudoscientific theories such as protochronism into scientific practice. These episodes also mark the return of Zare Popescu, the protagonist of Zmeura de cîmpie, who works with Dio at the Institute and whom again experiences life through digressions into historical symbolism, which this time are explicitly about dictatorship. These include an oblique mention of Ceaușescu being convinced that he was about to be replaced by "a Pisces", and Crăciun declared himself "absolutely convinced" that Zodia Scafandrului was supposed to end with an overview of the 1989 Revolution as "December". The narrative takes Diogene to Communist Poland, on a scientific mission which connects him to the Securitate's international schemes, and fictionalizes events related to the Gdańsk Shipyard strikes.

=== Other late works ===
Mircea Nedelciu's other short prose work include his 1998 contribution to erotic literature, which reworked a similar 19th-century piece by the folk writer Ion Creangă (Povestea poveștilor, "Tale of All Tales"), thus seeking to liberate profane language. Nedelciu, who deemed Creangă "the ballsiest Romanian-language storyteller", placed his version of the story during the late years of communism, describing sexual encounters between female teachers and party activists. Literary critic Paul Cernat commended the work for its "overflowing relish", and concluded on the posthumous relationship between the two authors and their treatment of Romanian folklore: "the genuine storyteller, bearer of the oral, peasant culture in the written from [versus] the Postmodern prose writer, who has seen everything written culture has to offer, returning to the rudimentary, popular roots of his writing". The text was among those rejected by Alex Ștefănescu, who claimed: "Ion Creangă's text is not simply picturesque, it is refined and full of charm, while Mircea Nedelciu's, fashioned in a cold manner, lacking the joy of storytelling, is merely vulgar."

Several other scattered prose fragments were discovered only after Nedelciu died. Among them is Uriaşa şi ciudata pasăre a viselor noastre ("The Giant and Weird Bird in Our Dreams"), which seems to refer to his countryside escapades with Ion Dumitriu and others. Literary critic Carmen Muşat advances a hypothesis according to which the undated work dates ca. 1990, basing it on various clues in the text. She also describes the "key" of the piece as being provided by its motto, "Now that we are done creating the world, what's left for us other than recreating it?" This, the critic argues, results in a "representative text for Mircea Nedelciu's prose", or "a story told with naturalness and well-tempered irony, about the ambiguity of relations between the narrator, the characters and the reader, about their double rooting in reality and textuality, as well as about their adventures in this 'through the looking-glass country' that is literature." The main intertextual reference in this case is Ernest Hemingway: Uriaşa şi ciudata pasăre a viselor noastre transmits images or sections of text borrowed from The Snows of Kilimanjaro, Hills Like White Elephants and The Short Happy Life of Francis Macomber.

== Legacy ==
Nedelciu has been voted among Romania's most important novelists in 2001, following a poll by Observator Cultural review: out of 150 novels, Femeia în roşu was voted 23rd-best, with Tratament fabulatoriu at 28 and Zmeura de cîmpie at 139. An edition of Zodia Scafandrului was published in 2000, sparking debates about the appropriateness of circulating unfinished versions of one's work. Nedelciu's posthumous bibliography also includes a 1999 selection of his entire work (under the collective title Aventuri într-o curte interioară) and a 2003 version of Femeia în roşu, as well as the collection Proză scurtă ("Short Prose" or "The Mircea Nedelciu Reader"). They were followed by a reprint of Zmeura... and third editions of Tratament fabulatoriu (2006) and Femeia în roșu (2008). Several other of his stories saw print in stages after his death (including Uriașa și ciudata pasăre a viselor noastre, published by Observator Cultural in July 2008).

In addition to Mircea Mihăieș, who recounts having learned the techniques of novelistic writing from his friend, a new generation of authors, most of whom debuted in the 1990s, assimilated influences from the writings of Nedelciu. Among them are Dan Lungu, Sorin Stoica, Lucian Dan Teodorovici, Andrei Bodiu, and Călin Torsan. Nedelciu's reworking of Povestea poveștilor, alongside Creangă's original and similar texts, was transformed into an eponymous fringe theater show, directed by actor Gheorghe Hibovski and premiered in spring 2009. According to critic Cornel Ungureanu, Femeia în roșu has endured as "the manifesto of Optzeciști prose writers, an exemplary work of autochthonous Postmodernism", while its main character, Ana Cumpănaș, has grown into "the actual aunt of autochthonous Postmodernism."

However, Daniel Cristea-Enache claimed, Nedelciu has become a victim of lack of interest, or "our lack of critical memory", after 1999, a phenomenon which he contrasts with the "almost always positive old critical references". Cristea-Enache believes the "not to flattering" explanation resides in the critical establishment's acknowledgment that Nedelciu "is not one of the sizable novelists." A different account was offered by Gheorghe Crăciun, who wrote: "Presently, [Nedelciu's] prose is, in the eyes of many (including school textbook authors), a rather precisely charted territory, which may no longer offer surprises, be they thematic or technical." According to Dinițoiu (who bases her conclusions on 2005 inquires among University of Bucharest students), Nedelciu's popularity declined not just because of his difficult stylistic approach, but also because "the referent" of "microrealism" has vanished—whereas Cărtărescu's "imaginative constructs" had maintained "a good quotation on the market of values."

In November 2002, during events marking Nedelciu's 52nd birthday, the Fundulea school which the writer had attended as a child was renamed in his honor. Ion Bogdan Lefter, who attended the event, commented: "Fundulea has become a spot on Romania's cultural map, owing to him, to Nedelciu, just like other small communities—albeit not many!—are renowned for being the places which so and so have left in order to become great names in national creativity..." Since 2002, the annual Gaudeamus Book Fair hosts an essay contest on literary subjects, targeting students in their final years of high school and awarding the Mircea Nedelciu National Prize for Reading.
