= Teodorovici =

Teodorovici is a surname. Notable people with the surname include:

- Doina and Ion Aldea Teodorovici, Moldovan musical duo
- Eugen Teodorovici (born 1971), Romanian politician
- Lucian Dan Teodorovici, Romanian writer, scriptwriter and theatre director
