= Marius Oprea =

Romanian writer and historian

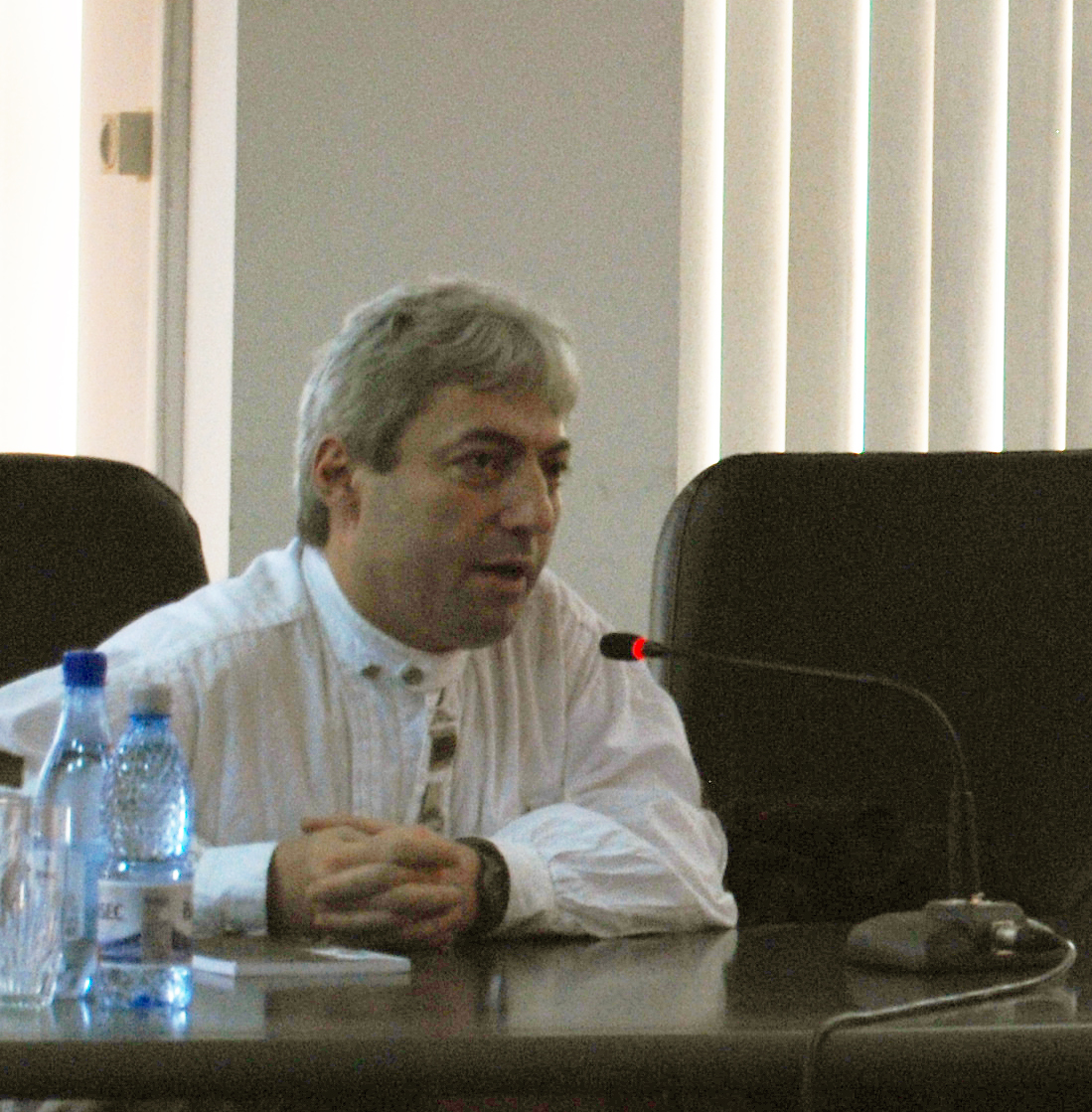
Marius Oprea

Marius Oprea (Romanian pronunciation: [ˈmari.us ˈopre̯a]; born 1964) is a Romanian historian (specialized in recent history), poet and essayist.

== Biography ==
Born in Târgovişte, he studied history at the University of Bucharest and he has a PhD with a thesis on the role and evolution of the Communist-era secret police, the Securitate between 1948 and 1964 (Rolul şi evoluţia Securităţii, 1948-1964). Oprea currently works as a journalist and researcher at the Romanian Institute of Recent History (IRIR). He also serves as the president of the Institute for the Investigation of Communist Crimes in Romania.

He made his debut as a poet in the collective volume Pauza de respiraţie ("Pause for Breathing"), together with Simona Popescu, Caius Dobrescu, and Andrei Bodiu.

Marius Oprea lives with his family in Braşov.

== Published volumes ==
- Banalitatea răului ("The Platitude of Evil")
- O istorie a Securităţii în documente ("A History of the Securitate through Documents")
- Securiştii partidului ("The Party's Securitate Members")
- Serviciul de cadre al PCR ca poliţie politică ("The Personnel Office of the Romanian Communist Party as a Political Police"; coauthors: Nicolae Videnie, Ioana Cirstocea, Andreea Năstase, Stejărel Olaru)
- Ziua care nu se uită. 15 noiembrie 1987, Braşov ("A Day That Cannot Be Forgotten. 15 November, Braşov"; coauthor Stejărel Olaru)
- Solo de trambulină ("Trampoline Solo", poems)
- Moştenitorii Securităţii ("Heirs to the Securitate")
- Chipul morţii: dialog cu Vladimir Bukovski despre natura comunismului ("The Face of Death: a Dialogue with Vladimir Bukovsky about the Nature of Communism", 2006)
- Bastionul cruzimii: o istorie a Securităţii, 2008)
- Sase feluri de a muri ("Six ways of dying", 2009)
