= Prisăcani =

- Commune
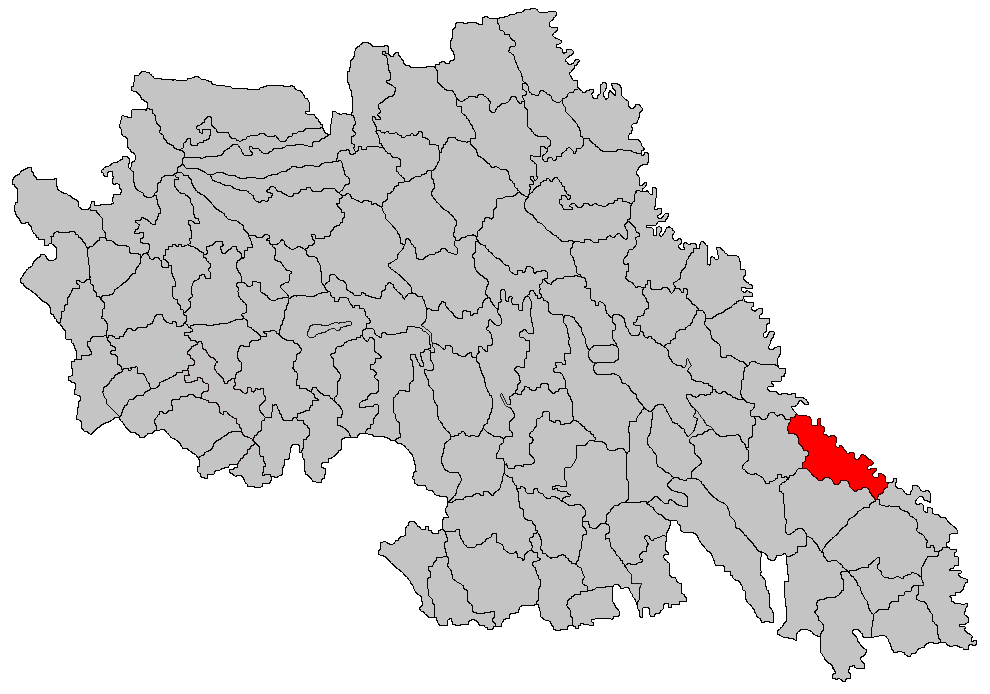
- Location in Iași County

- Location in Romania
- Coordinates: 47°5′N 27°53′E
- Country: Romania
- County: Iași
- Subdivisions: Prisăcani, Măcărești, Moreni

Government
  - Mayor (2024–2028): Ghiorghe Stanciu (PSD)
- Area: 59.92 km^{2} (23.14 sq mi)
- Elevation: 30 m (98 ft)
- Population (2021-12-01): 3,638
  - Density: 60.71/km^{2} (157.2/sq mi)
- Time zone: EET/EEST (UTC+2/+3)
- Postal code: 707390
- Area code: +40 x32
- Vehicle reg.: IS
- Website: uat-prisacani.ro

Prisăcani is a commune in Iași County, Western Moldavia, Romania. It is composed of three villages: Măcărești, Moreni and Prisăcani.

== See also ==
- Mariana Codruț
