= Șerban Foarță =

Romanian writer

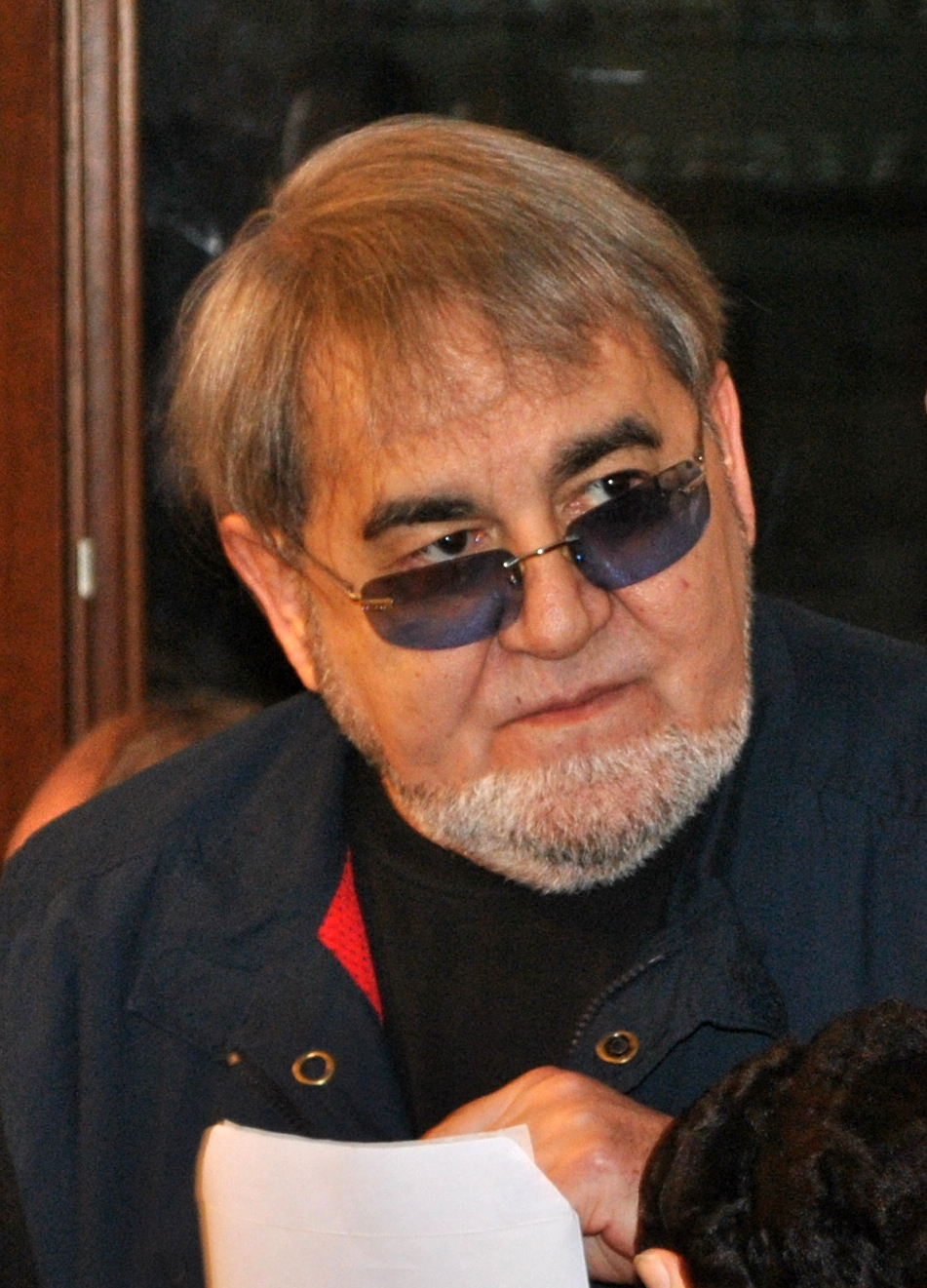
Foarță in 2010

Șerban Nicolae Foarță (Romanian pronunciation: [ʃerˈban nikoˈla.e ˈfo̯art͡sə]; born 8 July 1942, in Turnu Severin) is a contemporary Romanian writer. A translator, essayist, playwright, prose writer and even illustrator, he is most widely known for his poetry books.

== Style ==
Described by the critic Nicolae Manolescu as "the only major mannerist of our literature", Foarță is far from imitating the imagery of Baroque/mannerist poetry, drawing cues from many other influences and often using citations, pastiches, allusions, cultural references, puns. He has also practiced extensively constrained writing techniques, having been often compared with the French writers of Oulipo (including Georges Perec, who was translated by Foarță himself).

== Works ==
- Texte pentru Phoenix (Texts for Phoenix), Litera Publishing House, Bucharest, 1976 (collaboration with Andrei Ujică; reissued and reviewed in 1994)
- Simpleroze (Simpleroses), Facla Publishing House, Timișoara, 1978
- Șalul, eșarpele Isadorei/Șalul e șarpele Isadorei (The Shawl, Isadora's Scarf/The Shawl Is Isadora's Snake), Litera Publishing House, Bucharest, 1978 (reissued and reviewed in 1999)
- Copyright, Litera Publishing House, Bucharest, 1979
- Eseu asupra poeziei lui Ion Barbu (Essay on Ion Barbu's Poetry), Facla Publishing House, Timișoara, 1980
- Afinități selective (Selective Affinities), Cartea Românească, București, 1980 (essays)
- Ivan Turbincă, 1982-1983 (play after Ion Creangă)
- Areal, Cartea Românească, București, 1983
- Cucul și Pasărea din ceas (The Cuckoo and the Bird from the Clock), 1987-1988 (play)
- Holorime (Holorhymes), Litera Publishing House, Bucharest, 1986
- Afinități effective (Effective Affinities), Cartea Românească, Bucharest, 1990
- Dublul regim (diurn/nocturn) al presei (Double Regime (Diurnal/Nocturnal) of the Press), Amarcord Publishing House, Timișoara, 1997 (essay)
- Prolegomene la o Retorică publicitară (Prolegomena at a Advertising Rhetoric), West University Typography, Timișoara, 1998 (university reading)
- Caragialeta (Caragialette), Brumar Publishing House, Timișoara, 1998 (reissued and reviewed in 2002)
- Un castel în Spania pentru Annia (A Castle in Spain for Anne), Brumar Publishing House, Timișoara, 1999 (reissued and reviewed in 2006)
- Erau ziare, evenimente (There Were Newspapers, Events), Brumar Publishing House, Timișoara, 2000
- Opera somnia, Polirom Publishing House, Iaşi, 2000 (anthology prefaced by Mircea Mihăieș)
- Spectacol cu Dimov (Show with Dimov), Vinea Publishing House, Bucharest, 2002
- Caragialeta bis (Caragialette bis), Brumar Publishing House, Timișoara, 2002
- Poezii (carte la borcan) (Poems. Jarbook), Humanitas Publishing House, Bucharest, 2003
- Clepsidra cu zăpadă (Snow Clepsydra), Polirom Publishing House, Iaşi, 2003 (conceptual anthology of universal poetry selected and translated by Șerban Foarță)
- Fractalia, Brumar Publishing House, Timișoara, 2004
- Ethernul Pheminin (Ethernal Pheminine), Cartier Publishing House, Chişinău, 2004
- Honorificabilitudinitatibus, Brumar Publishing House, Timișoara, 2004 (essays)
- Rebis, Humanitas Publishing House, Bucharest, 2005
- Rimelări (Doses of Mascara), Cartea Românească, Bucharest, 2005
- Povestea soldatului (The Story of the Soldier), 2006–2007 (play after Igor Strawinsky)
- Prozarium, Vinea Publishing House, Bucharest, 2006 (prose)
- Jeu de paume, LiterNet Publishing House, 2006 (collaboration with Alex. Leo Şerban) (e-book)
- Cliquet, LiterNet Publishing House, 2006 (e-book)
- Douăzeci și opt de Psalmi în transpunerea lui Ș. F. (cu, fiecare-n parte, câte-o imagine de François Pamfil) (28 Psalms Redone By Ș.F. (each with an image by François Pamfil)), Eis Art Publishing House, Iaşi, 2007 (bibliophile edition)
- Istoriile unui matroz întors de pe Planeta Roz (The Tellings of a Sailor Who Came Back from the Pink Planet), Brumar Publishing House, Timișoara, 2007
- Cartea psalmilor (Psalm Book), Brumar Publishing House, Timișoara, 2007
- Un mire fără căpătâi (Endless Bridegroom), Polirom Publishing House, Iaşi, 2007 (collaboration with caricaturist Ion Barbu - not to be confused with modernist poet Ion Barbu)
- Mr. Clippit & comp., LUDEX Collection, Curtea Veche Publishing House, 2007
- Cucul din ceas și pasărea albastră (The Cuckoo from the Clock and the Blue Bird), LUDEX Collection, Curtea Veche Publishing House, 2007 (play)
- O brumă de paiete și confetti (Spangle and Confetti Dust), 2007 (collaboration with Emil Brumaru)
- Isprăvile lui Degețel și ale altora ca el (The Deeds of Small Finger and Others Like Him), Paralela 45 Publishing House, Piteşti, 2007
- Mic tratat de pisicologie (Short Treatise on Catology), Humanitas Publishing House, Bucharest, 2008
- Roșul ușor e rozul iluzor (Easy Red Is Illusionary Pink), Humanitas Publishing House, Bucharest, 2008
- Micul Print (The Small Print/Prince), ART Publishing House, 2008
- Ecclesiastul/Cântarea Cântărilor (The Ecclesiastic. The Song of Songs), ART Publishing House, 2008
- Cozerii în lila, Eis Art Publishing House, Iaşi, 2008 (dialogs with Iolanda Malamen)
- Cartea lui Iov (Iov's Book), Brumar Publishing House, Timișoara, 2010
