= Vasile Ernu =

Soviet-born Romanian writer

Vasile Ernu (born 1971) is a Soviet-born Romanian writer.

Born in Odessa, Soviet Union, Ernu studied philosophy at the Alexandru Ioan Cuza University in Iași, graduating in 1996, after which he earned a master's degree in philosophy at the Babeș-Bolyai University in Cluj-Napoca in 1997.

Ernu's debut book is Născut în URSS ("Born in the USSR"), a self-biographic work in which he recounts his experiences in the Soviet Union, in a mix of melancholia and irony.

The book earned him the debut prize of the Writers' Union of Romania and that of the România Literară magazine and it was translated in several languages, including: Russian, Italian, Spanish, Bulgarian, Hungarian, Polish and Georgian.

== Works ==
- Născut în URSS (Born in the USSR), Polirom, 2006
- Ultimii eretici ai Imperiului (The last heretics of the Empire), Polirom, 2009
- Intelighenția rusă azi (Russian intelligentsia today), Editura Cartier, 2012
- Sunt un om de stânga (I am a left-winger), Editura Cartier, 2013
- Sectanții. Mică trilogie a marginalilor (Cultists. A small trilogy of the marginalized), Polirom, 2015
- Intelighenția basarabeană azi. Interviuri, discuții, polemici despre Basarabia de ieri și de azi (Bessarabian intelligentsia today. Interviews, discussions, debates on today's and yesterday's Bessarabia), Editura Cartier, 2016
