= Textuality =

Collection of attributes

In literary theory, textuality comprises all of the attributes that distinguish the communicative content under analysis as an object of study. It is associated with structuralism and post-structuralism.

== Explanation ==
Textuality is not just about the written word; it also comprises the placement of the words and the reader’s interpretation. There is not a set formula to describe a text’s textuality; it is not a simple procedure. This summary is true even though the interpretation that a reader develops from that text may decide the identity and the definitive meanings of that text. Textuality, as a literary theory, is that which constitutes a text in a particular way. The text is an undecidable (there is an inexistence of an effective or "strict" method of writing or structure).

== Aspects ==
Being textual includes innumerable elements and aspects. Each and every form of text and text in that form of literature embraces and consists of its own individual and personal characteristics; these may include its personality, the individuality of that personality, the popularity, and so on. The textualities of the text define its characteristics. However, the characteristics are also closely associated with the structure of the text (Structuralism). Peter Barry's discussion of textuality notes that "its essence is the belief that things cannot be understood in isolation – they have to be seen in the context of the larger structures they are part of". To form an opinion, criticise, or completely interpret a text one would first have to read the complete literary work as a whole; this enables the reader to make supported judgements on the personality and individuality of the text. The text is always hiding something. Although the reading may define and the interpretation may decide, the text does not define or decide. The text rests as operationally and fundamentally indecidable. Roger Webster frequently uses metaphors of ‘weaving’, ‘tissue’, ‘texture’, ‘strands’, and ‘filiation’ when talking about the structure of texts. He also agrees that "instead, the text is a surface over which the reader can range in any number of ways that the text permits."

Textuality is a practice. Through a text’s textuality, it makes itself mean, makes itself be, and makes itself come about in a particular way. Through its textuality, the text relinquishes its status as identity and affirms its condition as pure difference. In indifference, the text "dedefines" itself, etches itself in a texture or network of meaning, which is not limited to the text itself. Barry describes this as a "structuralist approach to literature, there is a constant movement away from the interpretation of the individual literary work and a parallel drive towards understanding the larger, abstract structures which contain them".

A different view of textuality has been put forward by Rein Raud, according to whom textualities are "ordered sets of texts of different status that are related to each other and come with pre-arranged modes of interpretation". A textuality consists of base-texts, "those that define a textual community and form a part of the necessary cultural competence of its members", result-texts, "bids that have just been accepted and entered circulation, as well as those that have done so some time ago but are still being considered recent arrivals by their recipients", mediated by an operational memory, "a shared (and internally contradictory) mental space of the cultural community and its various subgroups where texts are produced and processed", which contains different kinds of knowledge, standards and codes shared to different extent by the carriers of the culture. According to Raud, this model is complementary to a model of cultural practices, in which the production, distribution and transmission of meaning is regarded in the context of individual participation and activity, while a textuality is necessarily shared and perceived by its carriers to be an objective, albeit constructed, reality.

== Concept of "text" ==
The word text arose within structuralism as a replacement for the older idea in literary criticism of the "work", which is always complete and deliberately authored. A text must necessarily be thought of as incomplete, indeed as missing something crucial that provides the mechanics of understanding. The text is always partially hidden; one word for the hidden part in literary theory is the subtext.

The concept of the text in structuralism requires a relatively simple relationship between language and writing. Jacques Derrida, a leading post-structuralist, questions this relationship, aiming his critique primarily at Ferdinand de Saussure, who, he claims, does not recognize in the relationship between speech and writing "more than a narrow and derivative function". For Derrida, this approach requires putting too much emphasis on speech:

"Saussure confronts the system of the spoken language with the system of phonetic (and even alphabetic) writing as though with the telos (purpose) of writing."

== Summation ==
Barry says that "one of structuralism's characteristic views is the notion that language doesn’t just reflect or record the world: rather, it shapes it, so that how we see is what we see". This is closely linked to "post-structuralism" which is in fact, closely linked also to textuality. And Barry believes that the "post-structuralist maintains that the consequences of this belief are that we enter a universe of radical uncertainty…". Derrida further states:

"This teleology leads to the interpretation of all eruptions of the nonphonetic within writing as transitory crises and accidents of passage, and it is right to consider this teleology to be a Western ethnocentrism, a premathematical primitivism, and a preformalist intuitionism."

In short, textuality is an individual and uncertain skill that will always be read and interpreted in texts in different ways, by different people, and at different times. It is a literary tool that can never be defined like an exact science and that will always be influenced by the writer's life, such as, their upbringing, education, culture, age, religion, gender, and multiple other persuading factors.

== In the media ==
Textuality can be seen, heard, read, and interacted with.

Each of the three forms of medium – oral, print, and electronic – has a different form of textuality that reflects the way the sensory modalities are stimulated.

- An example of textuality in the oral medium is the sound itself.
- An example of textuality in the print medium is the physicality of a book.
- An example of textuality in the electronic medium is the interactivity of a website, or visual of a specific television show.

== See also ==
- Text
- Intertextuality
- Hypertextuality
