= Adriana Babeți =

Romanian literary critic

- Born: November 12, 1949 (age 76); Oradea, Romania
- Education: University of Timișoara
- Occupations: Literary critic, translator, novelist, essayist, academic
- Writing career
- Language: Romanian

Adriana Babeți (born November 12, 1949 in Oradea) is a Romanian literary critic, translator, novelist, essayist, and academic. She is an associate professor at the University of Bucharest and a teacher of comparative literature at the West University of Timișoara.

== Education ==
Babeți graduated in 1972 from the Faculty of Philology of the University of Timișoara, and in 1996 was awarded a doctorate in comparative literature from the same university.

== Publications ==
- Dilemele Europei Centrale, 1998
- Despre arme și litere, 1999
- Femeia in roșu (edițion I, 1990)
- Dandysmul. O istorie, 2004
- Ultimul sufleu la Paris. 69 de rețete culinare, Polirom, 2006
- Amazoanele. O poveste
- Prozac 1. 101 pastile pentru bucurie
- Prozac 2. 90 de pastile împotriva tristeții
