= Mirel Cană =

Romanian novelist (1957–2020)

Mirel Cană (1957-2020) was a Romanian novelist, who wrote under the name Șerban Alexandru.

== Life ==
Mirel Cană studied philology at Iași University, and taught Romanian literature from 1982 to 1990. He was an editor at Editura Junimea in Iași from 1990 to 1992, and then a curator at the National Museum of Romanian Literature in Iași. In the decades following the Romanian Revolution, he also ran writers’ workshops in Iași.

His novels Mallarmé, Albedo and An Angel, a Dog, an Image form the first three volumes of a tetralogy, Benedict and Maledict. The fragmented, 'kaleidoscopic' style of An Angel, a Dog, an Image has been compared to the work of Camilo José Cela.

== Works ==
- (as Șerban Alexandru) Zgomotul de fond: roman [Background Noise: a novel]. Iaşi: Junimea, 1992.
- (as Șerban Alexandru) Mallarmé. 1995. Forthcoming in English translation by Alistair Ian Blyth as Mallarmé, Dalkey Archive Press, 2021. ISBN 9781628973440
- Albedo. 1995.
- (as Șerban Alexandru) Omul e mort: noua poema română [Man Is Dead: a new Romanian poem]. Iaşi: Junimea, 2001.
- (as Mirel Cană) Diagnostic [Diagnosis]. Bucharest: Humanitas, 2010. With a foreword by Ioanel C. Sinescu.
- Un înger, un cîine, o imagine: roman [An Angel, a Dog, an Image: a novel]. Iași: Polirom, 2015.
