= Emil Brumaru =

Romanian writer and poet (1938–2019)

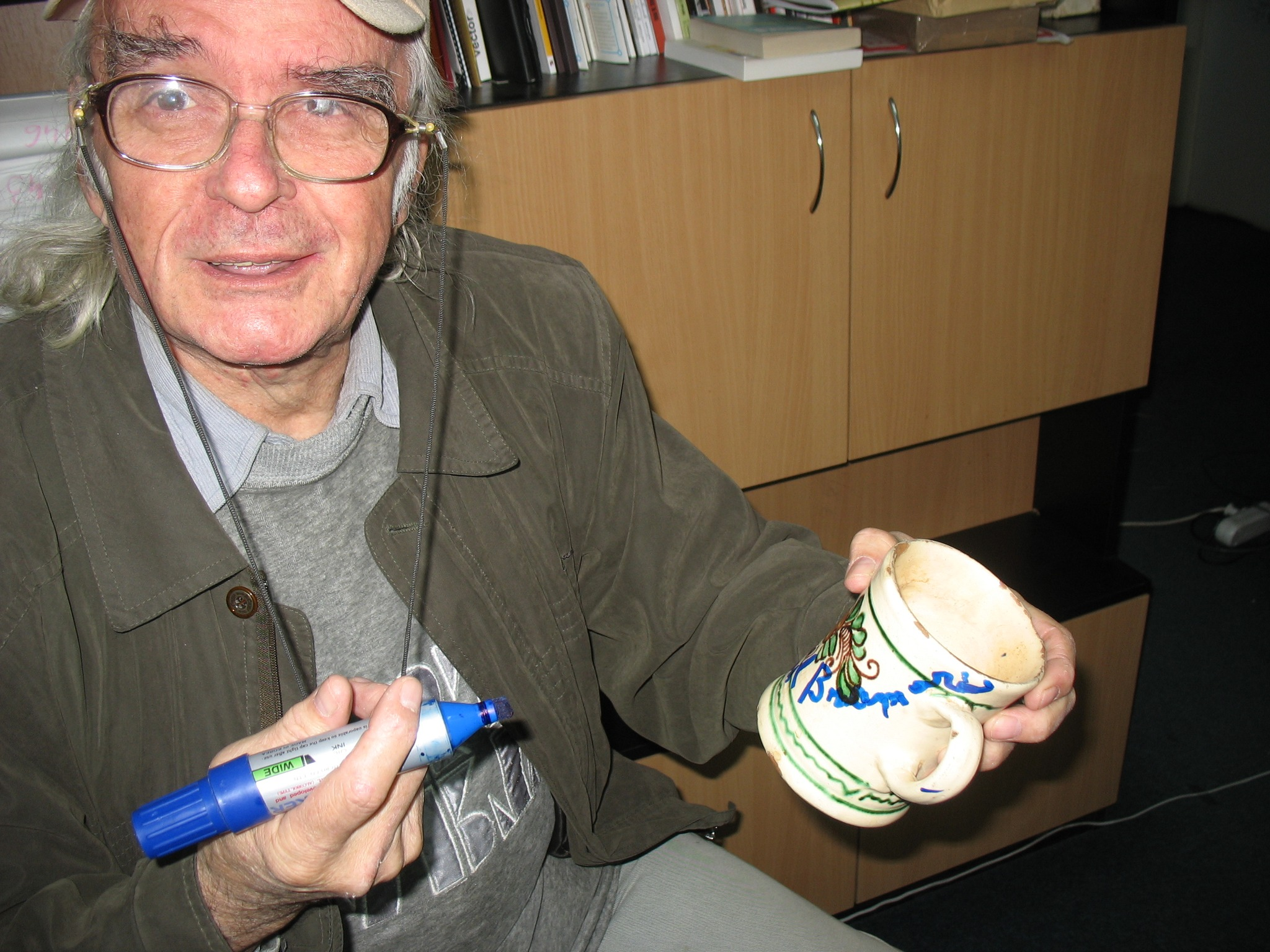

Emil Brumaru (Romanian pronunciation: [eˈmil bruˈmaru]; 25 December 1938 – 5 January 2019) was a Romanian writer and poet. He was renowned for his erotic poetry.

== Biography ==
Born in Bahmutea, Bessarabia, Brumaru studied medicine at the Faculty of Medicine in Iași before turning to poetry in 1975.

Brumaru died on 5 January 2019 in Iași at the age of 80.

== Works ==
- Versuri (Stanzas), Editura Albatros, Bucharest, 1970
- Detectivul Arthur (Arthur the Detective), Cartea Românească, Bucharest, 1970
- Julien Ospitalierul (Julian the Hospitaller), Cartea Românească, Bucharest, 1974
- Cântece naive (Naive Songs), Cartea Românească, Bucharest, 1976
- Adio, Robinson Crusoe (Adieu, Robinson Crusoe), Cartea Românească, Bucharest, 1978
- Dulapul îndrăgostit (The Enamoured Cupboard), Cartea Românească, Bucharest, 1980
- Ruina unui samovar (The Ruins of a Samovar), Cartea Românească, Bucharest, 1983
- Dintr-o scorbură de morcov (From the Hollow of a Carrot), Editura Nemira, Bucharest 1998
- Poeme alese (Selected Poems), 2003
- Opera poetică (2 vol., 2003, 3 vol., 2006) (Poetic Works), 2 vols., Editura Cartier, Kishinev, 2003, 2nd edition, 3 vols., 2006.
- Fluturii din pandişpan (Pain d'Espagne Butterflies), Editura Cronica, Iași, 2003
- Poezii (carte la borcan) (Poems. Jarbook), Editura Humanitas, Bucharest, 2003
- Cerşetorul de cafea (The Coffee Scrounger), Editura Polirom, Iași, 2004
- Submarinul erotic (The Erotic Submarine), Cartea Românească, Bucharest, 2005
- Infernala comedie (The Infernal Comedy), Editura Brumar, Timișoara, 2005
- Dumnezeu se uită la noi cu binoclul (God is Gazing at us through Binoculars), Editura Polirom, Iași, 2006
- O brumă de paiete şi confetti (A Frosting of Spangles and Confetti), co-author: Șerban Foarță, 2007
- Cântece de adolescent (An Adolescent's Songs), 2007
- Povestea boiernaşului de ţară şi a fecioarei... (The Story of the Rural Petty Boyar and the Maiden...), Editura Trei, Bucharest, 2008
- Ne logodim cu un inel din iarbă (We Betroth Ourselves with this Ring of Grass), 2008
- Opere I. Julien Ospitalierul (Works I. Julian the Hospitaller), Editura Polirom, Iași, 2009
- Opere II. Submarinul erotic (Works II. Erotic Submarine), Editura Polirom, Iași, 2009
- Rezervația de îngeri (The Angel Reservation), Humanitas, Bucharest, 2013

== Presence in anthologies ==
- Testament – Anthology of Modern Romanian Verse, second edition (bilingual version English/Romanian) – author and translator Daniel Ioniță, with Eva Foster, Rochelle Bews, and Prof.Dr.Daniel Reynaud – Editura Minerva, January 2015. ISBN 978-973-21-1006-5
- 2019 -Testament - 400 Years of Romanian Poetry/400 de ani de poezie românească - Minerva Publishing 2019 - Daniel Ioniță (editor and principal translator) assisted by Daniel Reynaud, Adriana Paul and Eva Foster. ISBN 978-973-21-1070-6
- 2020 - Romanian Poetry from its Origins to the Present - bilingual edition - Daniel Ioniță (editor and principal translator) with Daniel Reynaud, Adriana Paul and Eva Foster - Australian-Romanian Academy Publishing - 2020 - ISBN 978-0-9953502-8-1; OCLC 1288167046
