= Mariana Codruț =

Romanian poet, writer and journalist

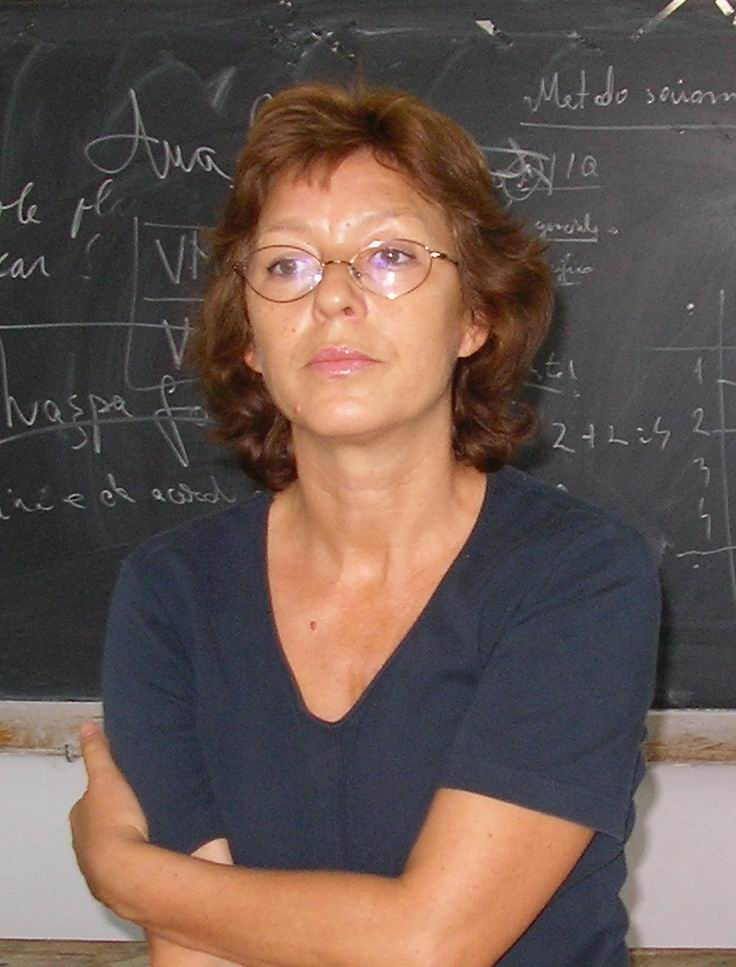
Mariana Codruţ

Mariana Codruţ (born 1 November 1956 in Prisacani, Romania) is a Romanian poet, writer and journalist.

== Works ==
Poetry:

- Măceşul din magazia de lemne (Junimea,1982).
- Schiţă de autoportret (Junimea, 1986).
- Tabieturile nopţii de vară (Cartea Românească, 1989).
- Existenţă acută (Cartea Românească, 1994).
- Blanc (Vinea, 2000).
- Ultima patrie (Paralela 45, 2007).
- Areal (Paralela 45, 2011)

Essay:

- Românul imparțial (Dacia, 2011)

Novels:

- Casa cu storuri galbene (Polirom, 1997).
- Nudul Dianei (Polirom, 2007).

Short stories:

- Ul Baboi şi alte povestiri (Polirom, 2004).

Anthologies:

- Cartea roz a comunismului (Versus, 2004, ed. Gabriel H. Decuble).
- Tovarăşe de drum. Experienţa feminină în communism (Polirom, 2008, eds. Dan Lungu, Radu Pavel Gheo); translated in Italian: Compagne di viaggio (Sandro Teti editore, Roma, 2011, transl. by Mauro Barindi, Anita Natascia Bernacchia, Maria Luisa Lombardo)
