= Andrei Bodiu =

Romanian poet and literary commentator (1965–2014)

Andrei Bodiu (Romanian pronunciation: [anˈdrej boˈdi.u]; April 27, 1965, in Baia Mare - April 3, 2014, in Oradea) was a Romanian poet, literary commentator, Professor of Literature and publicist.

He graduated in Philology at the Universităţii din Timişoara in 1988.

In 1991, he published his first major work Pauză de respiraţie, in collaboration with Simona Popescu, Caius Dobrescu and Marius Oprea.

== Selected works ==
=== Poetry ===
- Cursa de 24 ore (1994);
- Poezii patriotice (1995);
- Studii pe viaţă şi pe moarte (Editura Paralela 45, 2000).

=== Critical studies ===
- Direcţia 80 în poezia română (Editura Paralela 45, 2000);
- Şapte teme ale romanului postpaşoptist (Editura Paralela 45, 2002);
- George Coşbuc, micromonografie (2002);
- Mircea Cărtărescu, micromonografie (2003).

=== Novel ===
- Bulevardul Eroilor, (Editura Paralela 45, 2004).
