= Lucian Dan Teodorovici =

Romanian writer, scriptwriter and theatre director

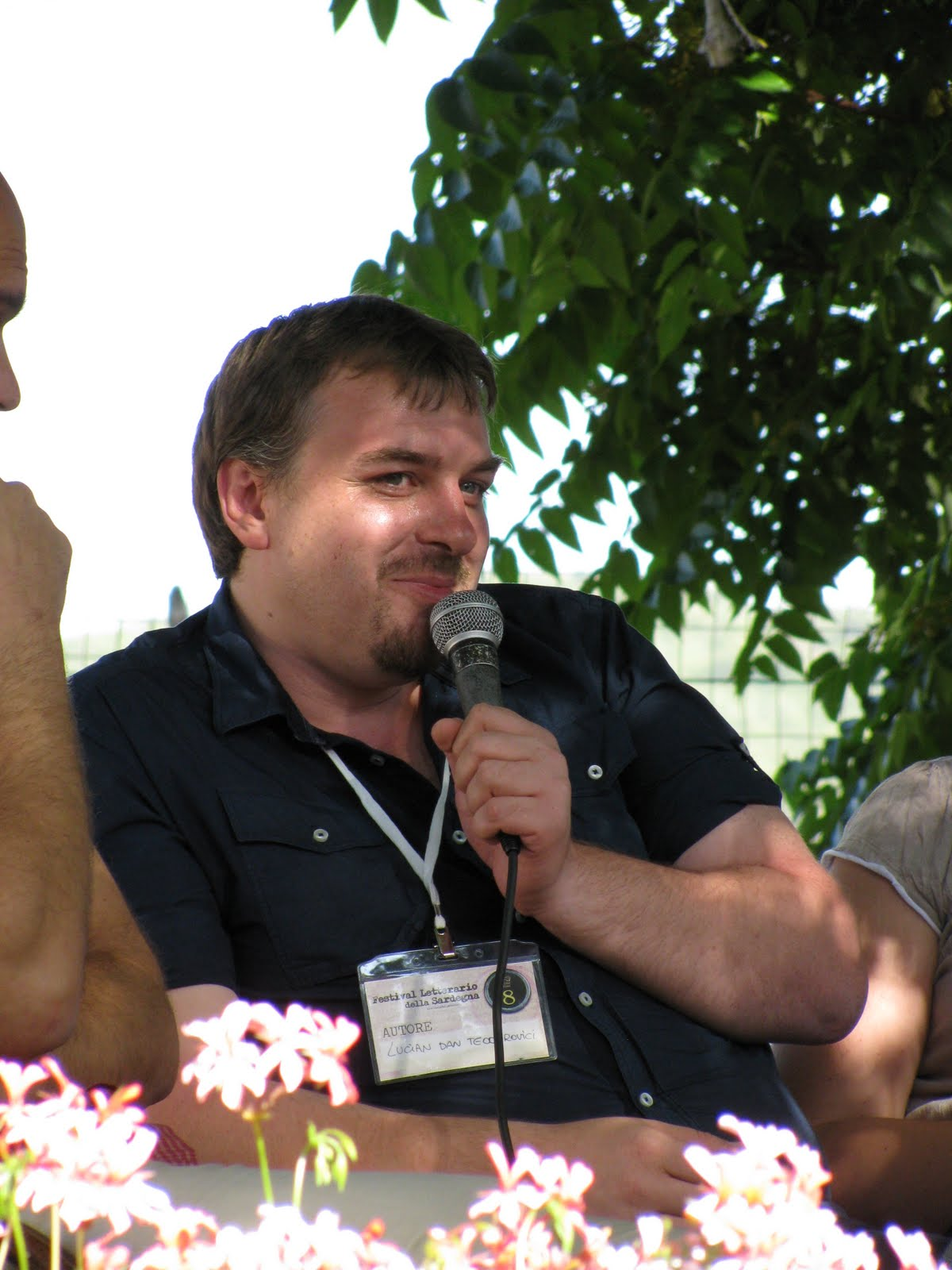
- Born: June 17, 1975; Rădăuți
- Occupations: writer (novels, short stories), scriptwriter, theatre director, publisher
- Writing career
- Period: 1999-present
- Genres: satire, realistic fiction, historical fiction
- Literary movement: Postmodernism, Minimalism

Lucian Dan Teodorovici is a Romanian writer, scriptwriter and theatre director.

== Biography ==
Lucian Dan Teodorovici was born in 1975, in Rădăuți, Suceava County. He is the Manager of The National Museum of Romanian Literature Iași and the Manager of the Iași International Festival of Literature and Translation (FILIT). He also works as senior editor of the Suplimentul de cultură weekly.

== Literary work ==
- Shortly before the Extraterrestrials Descended Among us (Cu puțin timp înaintea coborîrii extratereştrilor printre noi), novel, 1999
- The World Seen through a Hole the Width of a Spliff (Lumea văzută printr-o gaură de mărimea unei țigări marijuana), short stories, 2000
- Our Circus Presents... (Circul nostru vă prezintă:), novel, 2002
- 96-00. Short Stories (96-00. Povestiri), short stories, 2002
- Then I Clouted Him Twice (Atunci i-am ars două palme), short stories, 2004
- The Other Love Stories (Celelalte povești de dragoste), novel, 2009
- Matei the Brown (Matei Brunul), novel, 2011
- One + One (+ One...). Some Comedies (Unu + unu (+ unu...). Niște comedii), plays, 2014
- The One Who Calls the Dogs (Cel care cheamă câinii), novel, 2017

LTD made his literary debut in 1999, publishing his novel Shortly before the Extraterrestrials Descended Among us (Cu puţin timp înaintea coborîrii extratereștrilor printre noi), at the OuTopos Publishing House. The second revised and expanded edition was published by Polirom Publishing House, in Iași.

In 2000, he went on to publish a collection of short stories entitled The World Seen through a Hole the Width of a Spliff (Lumea văzută printr-o gaură de mărimea unei țigări marijuana), Tîrgu Jiu: Constantin Brâncuși Foundation Press.

Critical acclaim arrived in 2002, after Polirom published his novel Our Circus Presents... (Circul nostru vă prezintă:). The novel was translated into English, Spanish, Italian, Hungarian and Bulgarian. The main character of the book, a man of thirty, lives in a modest flat on the fifth floor of a housing block. Every Sunday, the protagonist performs a kind of ritual: he climbs onto the window ledge and waits for a suicidal urge, which, however, never comes. The events of the novel unfold over the course of three days. On the first day, the young man sets off to the town's railway station in search of prostitutes. On the way, he runs into another young man, known during the story as the "bloke with the orange braces", who has hanged himself from an old steam engine in an unused siding. The protagonist saves him and takes him to the station hospital, from where the bloke with the orange braces discharges himself on his own two feet. The main character will later find the man he saved in a railway workers’ bar. He is unwillingly embroiled in a fight provoked by the bloke with the orange braces, who breaks a chair over the head of one of the prostitutes in the bar, leaving her in a pool of blood. For the second time in the space of the same day, the protagonist saves the bloke with the orange braces, this time from the fury of the drinkers in the bar, and takes him back to his own flat. This is where the entire atmosphere of the story takes shape : a disabused world of strange neighbours and a building superintendent who is an old woman yearning for a relationship with a young man of thirty. During the other two days covered by the action of the novel, we discover that the young protagonist is a member of a kind of club for "professional suicides" – people in search of death, sometimes for the most stupid reasons and in the most bizarre ways: one wants to kill himself by sleeping with as many women of easy virtue as possible, in the hope of contracting a fatal disease; another wants to commit suicide by drinking huge quantities of the finest quality whiskey, until he falls into an alcoholic coma; etc. They are all "suicide artists", and it is into this strange group that the young man of thirty would now like to introduce his new friend. Parallel to these events, the two attempt to find out whether the prostitute in the bar has managed to survive being hit over the head with a chair. The answer will not be revealed until the end of the novel. The finale closes the circle of the tale: during a further visit to the railway station, the protagonist discovers that the prostitute has died. He does not tell his new friend about this. At the same time, however, frightened at the turn that events have taken, he comes up with a plan : he convinces the bloke with the orange braces to go to the station, to the locomotive where he first found him. And he proposes that they both commit suicide. The young man tells his companion that in this way the railway workers will understand that they both regret the incident with the prostitute – and they will be forgiven. In fact, the protagonist's plan is to free himself from the noose and to chase away anyone who tries to save the other, allowing him to die and thereby escaping from any legal consequences of his association with the prostitute's murderer. The plan fails, however, for various reasons – the protagonist does not allow his new friend to die, but rather tells him the truth about the prostitute and about what he has been planning. It all ends with a roar of laughter, an agonised roar of laughter which consecrates the general principle and theme of the book, according to which whoever has failed at everything else in life can only be consistent and fail at his own death.

Same year, 2002, LDT published another collection of short stories, entitled 96-00. Short Stories (96-00. Povestiri), at LiterNet, an online publishing house, in Bucharest.

Then I Clouted Him Twice (Atunci i-am ars două palme/ short stories, Iași: Polirom, 2004) is divided into three sections. In the first, the texts centre on the grotesque side of insignificant events, and the humour tempers the dramatic intensity of situations in which we all might find ourselves. The second, autobiographical section is in fact a short novel about childhood during the communist period, in which a cruel system is presented from the viewpoint of a child. Finally, the short stories of the third section have a social and sometimes political moral, displaying a dark, dry humour, which often borders on the absurd. The book was published into German in 2009 (Dann ist mir die Hand ausgerutscht, Ludwisburg: Pop Verlag).

The next book of LDT, a novel entitled The Other Love Stories (Celelalte povești de dragoste), was published by Polirom in 2009, and it was translated into: Italian, French, Polish and Bulgarian. The Other Love Stories might be regarded as a modular novel. Its eleven sequences can function both as self-contained prose pieces and as episodes in a single narrative, whose central theme is failed love. This failure can unfold at a number of levels, with each "story" bringing with it an additional nuance, an additional idea to give shape to the whole. In the book, two central characters pass from one sequence to the next, namely the character of the narrator, who is a journalist for a local newspaper, and his wife. Their story takes shape not only by means of narratives from various periods in the narrator's life (childhood, adolescence, the present), but also in the tales of secondary characters, in which the narrator is involved in one way or another. One after the other and in surprising ways, all these sequences provide various angles from which love can be viewed, while failure, an idea that insinuates itself at the close of the volume, demands that each separate story and each choice made at one time or another by the central character should be re-evaluated. One of the sequences of the book, entitled Goose Chase, was published in the acclaimed American anthology Best European Fiction – 2011, ed. by Aleksandar Hemon, Dalkey Archive Press.

A resounding success with public and critics alike, his latest novel, Matei the Brown (Matei Brunul), Iași: Polirom, 2011, was awarded numerous prizes and has been translated into French, at Gaïa Éditions, and it was very well received by the press. The novel has been translated also into Bulgarian, Hungarian, Polish, and is due to be translated into English and to be published by (Dalkey Archive Press). Matei The Brown is set in the period between 1945 and 1959. The novel's protagonist, Bruno Matei, a Romanian puppeteer of Italian ancestry, is presented from two different perspectives, on two narrative levels. In the first, which unfolds in Iași, over the course of the year 1959, he is suffering from partial amnesia following an accident, and is a free man, albeit constantly shadowed by Bojin, the secret policeman assigned to him. A relationship develops between him and the secret policeman, and a series of ‘mysteries’ regarding Bruno Matei's past life are placed in circulation. As a diversion, the Securitate invents dramatic events in the main character's past, events which obviously never took place, but whose sole purpose is to remould his present, to make him docile and obedient to the new totalitarian order. The second narrative, equal in length to the first, focuses on Bruno Matei's real past, spent in four communist prisons: the Uranus Penitentiary in Bucharest, the Valea Neagră Peninsula Penal Colony, Galaţi Penitentiary, and Iași Penitentiary. The two narratives unfold in parallel, so that the Securitate’s diversionary actions are one by one exploded by the often disarmingly innocent story of a man crushed beneath the juggernaut of the social and political changes that swept Eastern Europe in the second half of the twentieth century. Matei the Brown is the first purely fictional work to explore the communist prison system in Romanian literature. The blurb for the back cover of the English edition of the novel (in print) is written by the acclaimed writer and literary critic David Lodge. He wrote: "So many excellent novels have been written about life under communism in Soviet Russia and the countries of Eastern Europe that it difficult for any writer today to find an original way to depict the oppressiveness, inhumanity, and institutionalised injustice of those regimes before they began to collapse in 1989. But Lucian Dan Teodorovici has succeeded in «Matei Brunul». [...] It is a remarkable achievement by a writer who was born in 1975 and had no personal experience of the era it describes, bearing comparison with classics of the genre such as Milan Kundera's «The Joke». Such books are salutary reminders to British readers of how lucky we are never to have lived in a totalitarian state".

His most recent novel, The One Who Calls the Dogs (Cel care cheamă câinii), has been published in 2017 by Polirom Publishing House, and it is an autobiographical novel written while the author was struggling to fight against lymph cancer. This novel also has a great success in Romania, with many good reviews.

== Awards and recognition ==
- 2011: The Contrafort "Book of the Year" award.
- 2012: The Observator cultural National Award for Prose.
- 2012: The "Augustin Frățilă" literary prize for the best novel of the year.
- 2012: The Ziarul de Iași National Award for Prose.
- 2012: The Readers' Choice at the Romanian Book Market Awards.
- 2015: The Natalia Gorbaniewska Reader's Choice Award (The Angelus Prize for Literature, in Wroclaw, Poland).

== Screenplays ==
- Animat Planet Show (between 2005 and 2008 – 7 seasons), in coll. with Florin Lăzărescu, broadcast by the Antena 1 television channel.
- One Second of Life/ O secundă de viață (feature-length film adaptation of "Our Circus Presents..).
- I’m a Communist Old Lady/ Sînt o babă comunistă (feature-length film).
- Chocolates/ Bomboane de ciocolată (short film).
- A Good Day/ O zi bună (short film).
- Goose Chase/ După gâște (short film).
- Grasshopers/ Greieri (short film).
