= Polirom =

Romanian publishing house

Polirom or Editura Polirom ("Polirom" Publishing House) is a Romanian publishing house with a tradition of publishing classics of international literature and also various titles in the fields of social sciences, such as psychology, sociology, and anthropology. The company was founded in February 1995 in Iași. The first title published by Polirom was For Europe, by Adrian Marino. As of 2023, Polirom has published about 8,300 titles, in over 60 series and collections, amounting to 13 million copies in all. The editorial profile includes both fiction (35%) and nonfiction (65%).

In 2008, the company published 700 new titles, in a range of over 70 collections ranging from self-help to modern classics such as Robert Musil's The Man Without Qualities and from textbooks to "chick lit".

Polirom claims to be Romania's most profitable publisher as well as the publisher with the highest turn-over. It now has four major offices in Romania, including one in Bucharest.
