= Ion Creangă =

Moldavian - born writer, raconteur and school teacher (1837–1889)

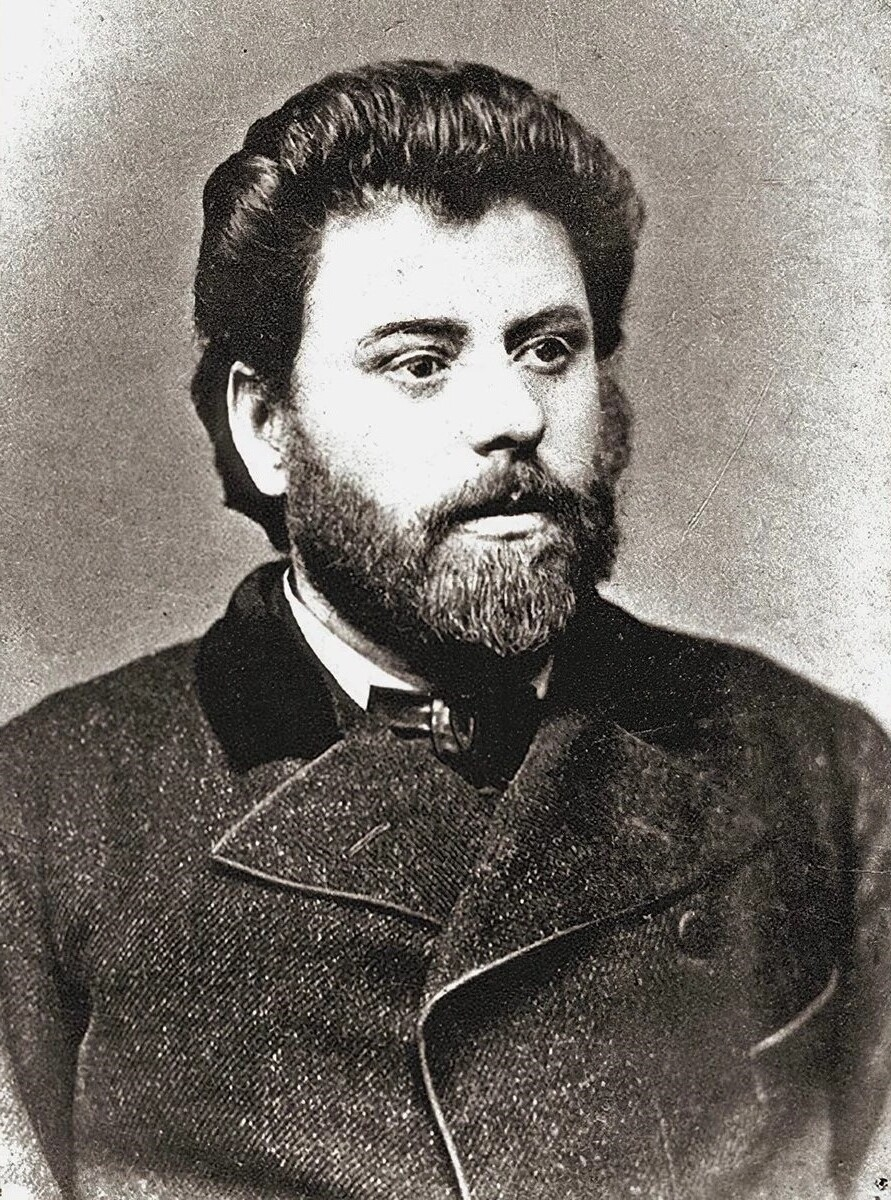
- Creangă in 1877
- Born: March 1, 1837; Humulești, Principality of Moldavia (now part of Târgu Neamț, Romania)
- Died: December 31, 1889 (aged 52) (seizure); Iași, Kingdom of Romania
- Resting place: Eternitatea Cemetery, Iași, Romania
- Occupations: Short story writer, educator, folklorist, poet, textile worker, cleric, politician: Moldavian; Romanian
- Spouse: Ileana Grigoriu (m. 1859–1873)
- Children: Constantin (born December 19, 1860)
- Writing career
- Pen name: Popa Smântână; Ioan Vântură-Țară
- Language: Romanian
- Period: 1864–1883
- Genres: Anecdote; children's literature; erotic literature; fable; fairy tale; fantasy; lyric poetry; memoir; novella; satire; short story; sketch story
- Movements: Realism; Junimea

Signature
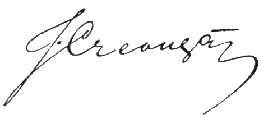

Ion Creangă (Romanian pronunciation: [iˈon ˈkre̯aŋɡə]; also known as Nică al lui Ștefan a Petrei, Ion Torcălău and Ioan Ștefănescu; March 1, 1837 – December 31, 1889) was a Moldavian, later Romanian writer, raconteur and schoolteacher. A main figure in 19th-century Romanian literature, he is best known for his Childhood Memories volume, his novellas and short stories, and his many anecdotes. Creangă's main contribution to fantasy and children's literature includes narratives structured around eponymous protagonists ("Harap Alb", "Ivan Turbincă", "Dănilă Prepeleac", "Stan Pățitul"), as well as fairy tales indebted to conventional forms ("The Story of the Pig", "The Goat and Her Three Kids", "The Mother with Three Daughters-in-Law", "The Old Man's Daughter and the Old Woman's Daughter"). Widely seen as masterpieces of the Romanian language and local humor, his writings occupy the middle ground between a collection of folkloric sources and an original contribution to a literary realism of rural inspiration. They are accompanied by a set of contributions to erotic literature, collectively known as his "corrosives".

A defrocked Romanian Orthodox priest with an unconventional lifestyle, Creangă made an early impact as an innovative educator and textbook author, while pursuing a short career in nationalist politics with the Free and Independent Faction. His literary debut came late in life, closely following the start of his close friendship with Romania's national poet Mihai Eminescu and their common affiliation with the influential conservative literary society Junimea. Although viewed with reserve by many of his colleagues there, and primarily appreciated for his records of oral tradition, Creangă helped propagate the group's cultural guidelines in an accessible form. Later critics have often described him, alongside Eminescu, Ion Luca Caragiale and Ioan Slavici, as one of the most accomplished representatives of Junimist literature.

Ion Creangă was posthumously granted several honors, and is commemorated by a number of institutions in both Romania and neighboring Moldova. These include the Bojdeuca building in Iași, which, in 1918, was opened as the first memorial house in Romania. His direct descendants include Horia Creangă, one of the leading Romanian architects during the interwar period.

== Biography ==
=== Background and family ===
Ion Creangă was born in Humulești in the Principality of Moldavia, a former village which has since been incorporated into Târgu Neamț city, the son of Orthodox trader Ștefan sin Petre Ciubotariul and his wife Smaranda. His native area, bordering on heavily forested areas, was in the Eastern Carpathian foothills, and included into what was then the Principality of Moldavia. The surrounding region's population preserved an archaic way of life, dominated by shepherding, textile manufacturing and related occupations, and was noted for preserving the older forms of local folklore. Another characteristic of the area, which left an impression on Creangă's family history, was related to the practice of transhumance and the links between ethnic Romanian communities on both sides of the mountains, in Moldavia and Transylvania: on his maternal side, the writer descended from Maramureș-born peasants, while, according to literary historian George Călinescu, his father's origin may have been further southwest, in Transylvania-proper.

The family had reached a significant position within their community: Ștefan sin Petre had made a steady income from his itinerant trade in wool, while his wife was the descendant of the Creangăs of Pipirig, a family of community leaders. The latter's members included Moldavian Metropolitan Iacob Stamati, as well as Smaranda's father, Vornic David, and her uncle Ciubuc Clopotarul, a monk at Neamț Monastery. Proud of this tradition, she insisted that her son pursue a career in the Church. According to his own recollection, the future writer was born on March 1, 1837—a date which has since been challenged. Creangă's other statements mention March 2, 1837, or an unknown date in 1836. The exactitude of other accounts is equally unreliable: community registers from the period gave the date of June 10, 1839, and mention another child of the same name being born to his parents on February 4, 1842 (the more probable birth date of Creangă's younger brother Zahei). The imprecision also touches other aspects of his family life: noting the resulting conflicts in data, Călinescu decided that it was not possible for one to know if the writer's parents were married to each other (and, if so, if they were on their first marriage), nor how many children they had together. At a time when family names were not legally required, and people were primarily known by various nicknames and patronymics, the boy was known to the community as Nică, a hypocorism formed from Ion, or more formally as Nică al lui Ștefan a Petrei ("Nică of Ștefan of Petru", occasionally Nic-a lui Ștefan a Petrei).

=== Childhood, youth and ordination ===
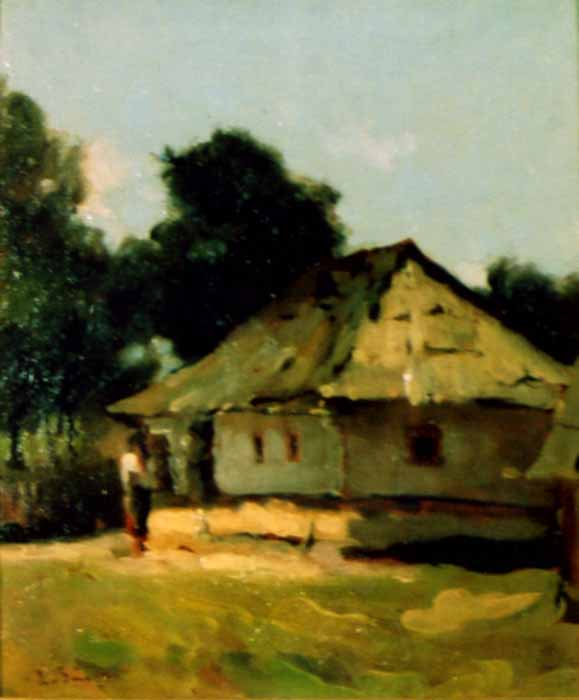
Casa din Humulești ("The House in Humulești"), painting by Aurel Băeșu

After an idyllic period, which is recounted in the first section of his Childhood Memories, Ion Creangă was sent to primary school, an institution then in the care of Orthodox Church authorities, where he became noted for his rebellious attitude and appetite for truancy. Among his colleagues was a female student, Smărăndița popii (known later as Smaranda Posea), for whom he developed an affection which lasted into his adult life, over decades in which the two no longer saw each other. He was taught reading and writing in Cyrillic alphabet through peer tutoring techniques, before the overseeing teacher, Vasile a Ilioaiei, was lassoed off the street and conscripted by the Moldavian military at some point before 1848. After another teacher, whom the Memories portray as a drunk, died from cholera in late 1848, David Creangă withdrew his grandson from the local school and took him to a similar establishment in Broșteni, handing him into the care of a middle-aged woman, Irinuca. Ion Creangă spent several months at Irinuca's remote house on the Bistrița River, before the proximity of goats resulted in a scabies infection and his hastened departure for Pipirig, where he cured himself using birch extract, a folk remedy mastered by his maternal grandmother Nastasia.

After returning to school between late 1849 and early 1850, Creangă was pulled out by his financially struggling father, spent the following period working in wool-spinning, and became known by the occupational nickname Torcălău ("Spinster"). He only returned in third grade some four years later, having been sent to the Târgu Neamț public school, newly founded by Moldavian Prince Grigore Alexandru Ghica as part of the Regulamentul Organic string of reforms. A colleague of future philosopher Vasile Conta in the class of priest and theologian Isaia "Popa Duhu" Teodorescu, Creangă was sent to the Fălticeni seminary in 1854. After having been registered as Ioan Ștefănescu (a variant of his given name and a family name based on his patronymic), the adolescent student eventually adopted his maternal surname of Creangă. According to Călinescu, this was done either "for aesthetic reasons" (as his new name, literally meaning "branch" or "bough", "sounds good") or because of a likely discovery that Ștefan was not his real father. Dan Grădinaru, a researcher of Creangă's work, believes that the writer had a special preference for the variant Ioan, generally used in more learned circles, instead of the variant Ion that was consecrated by his biographers.

Having witnessed, according to his own claim, the indifference and mundane preoccupations of his peers, Creangă admitted to having taken little care in his training, submitting to the drinking culture, playing practical jokes on his colleagues, and even shoplifting, while pursuing an affair with the daughter of a local priest. According to his own statement, he was a philanderer who, early in his youth, had already "caught the scent" of the catrință (the skirt in traditional costumes). In August 1855, circumstances again forced him to change schools: confronted with the closure of his Fălticeni school, Creangă left for the Central Seminary attached to Socola Monastery, in Moldavia's capital of Iași. Ștefan sin Petre's 1858 death left him without means of support, and he requested being directly ordained, but, not being of the necessary age, was instead handed a certificate to attest his school attendance. He was soon after married, after a brief courtship, to the 15-year-old Ileana, daughter of Priest Ioan Grigoriu from the church of the Forty Saints, where he is believed to have been in training as a schoolteacher. The ceremony took place in August 1859, several months after the personal union between Moldavia and its southern neighbor Wallachia, effected by the election of Alexandru Ioan Cuza as Domnitor. Having been employed as a cantor by his father in law's church, he was ordained in December of the same year, assigned to the position of deacon in Holy Trinity Church, and, in May 1860, returned to Forty Saints.

Relations between Creangă and Grigoriu were exceptionally tense. Only weeks after his wedding, the groom, who had probably agreed to marriage only because it could facilitate succeeding Grigoriu, signed a complaint addressed to Metropolitan Sofronie Miclescu, denouncing his father in law as "a killer", claiming to have been mistreated by him and cheated out of his wife's dowry, and demanding to be allowed a divorce. The response to this request was contrary to his wishes: he was ordered into isolation by the Dicasterie, the supreme ecclesiastical court, being allowed to go free only on promise to reconcile with Grigoriu.

=== Beginnings as schoolteacher and clash with the Orthodox Church ===
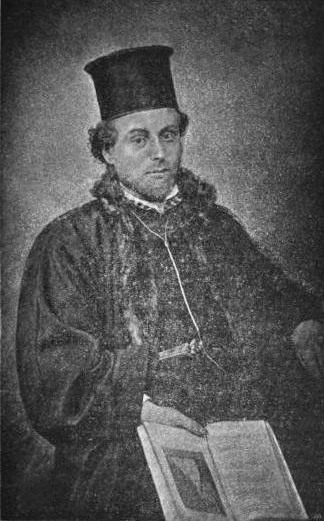
Ion Creangă as a deacon

In 1860, Creangă enlisted at the Faculty of Theology, part of the newly founded University of Iași, and, in December 1860, fathered a son, Constantin. His life still lacked in stability, and he decided to move out of Grigoriu's supervision and into Bărboi Church, before his position as deacon was cut out of the budget and his belongings were evicted out of his temporary lodging in 1864. He contemplated leaving the city, and even officially requested a new assignment in the more remote Bolgrad. Since January 1864, when the Faculty of Theology had been closed down, he had been attending Iași's Trei Ierarhi Monastery normal school (Trisfetite or Trei Sfetite), where he first met the young cultural figure Titu Maiorescu, who served as his teacher and supervisor, and whence he graduated as the first in his class (June 1865). Embittered by his own experience with the education system, Creangă became an enthusiastic promoter of Maiorescu's ideas on education reform and modernization, and in particular of the new methods of teaching reading and writing. During and after completing normal school, he was assigned to teaching positions at Trisfetite. While there, he earned the reputation of a demanding teacher (notably by accompanying his reports on individual students with characterizations such as "idiot", "impertinent" or "envious"). Accounts from the period state that he made use of corporal punishment in disciplining his pupils, and even surpassed the standards of violence accepted at the time.

In parallel, he was beginning his activities in support of education reform. By 1864, he and several others, among them schoolteacher V. Răceanu, were working on a new primer, which saw print in 1868 under the title Metodă nouă de scriere și cetire pentru uzul clasei I primară ("A New Method of Writing and Reading for the Use of 1st Grade Primary Course Students"). It mainly addressed the issues posed by the new Romanian alphabetical standard, a Romanization replacing Cyrillic spelling (which had been officially discarded in 1862). Largely based on Maiorescu's principles, Metodă nouă ... became one the period's most circulated textbooks. In addition to didactic texts, it also featured Creangă's isolated debut in lyric poetry, with a naïve piece titled Păsărica în timpul iernii ("The Little Bird in Wintertime"). The book was followed in 1871 by another such work, published as Învățătoriul copiilor ("The Children's Teacher") and co-authored by V. Răceanu. It included several prose fables and a sketch story, "Human Stupidity", to which later editions added Poveste ("A Story") and Pâcală (a borrowing of the fictional folk character better known as Păcală).

In February 1866, having briefly served at Iași's Pantelimon Church, he was welcomed by hegumen Isaia Vicol Dioclias into the service of Golia Monastery. Around 1867, his wife Ileana left him. After that moment, Creangă began losing interest in performing his duties in the clergy, and, while doing his best to hide that he was no longer living with his wife, took a mistress. The marriage's breakup was later attributed by Creangă himself to Ileana's adulterous affair with a Golia monk, and rumors spread that Ileana's lover was a high-ranking official, the protopope of Iași. Creangă's accusations, Călinescu contends, are nevertheless dubious, because the deacon persisted in working for the same monastery after the alleged incident.

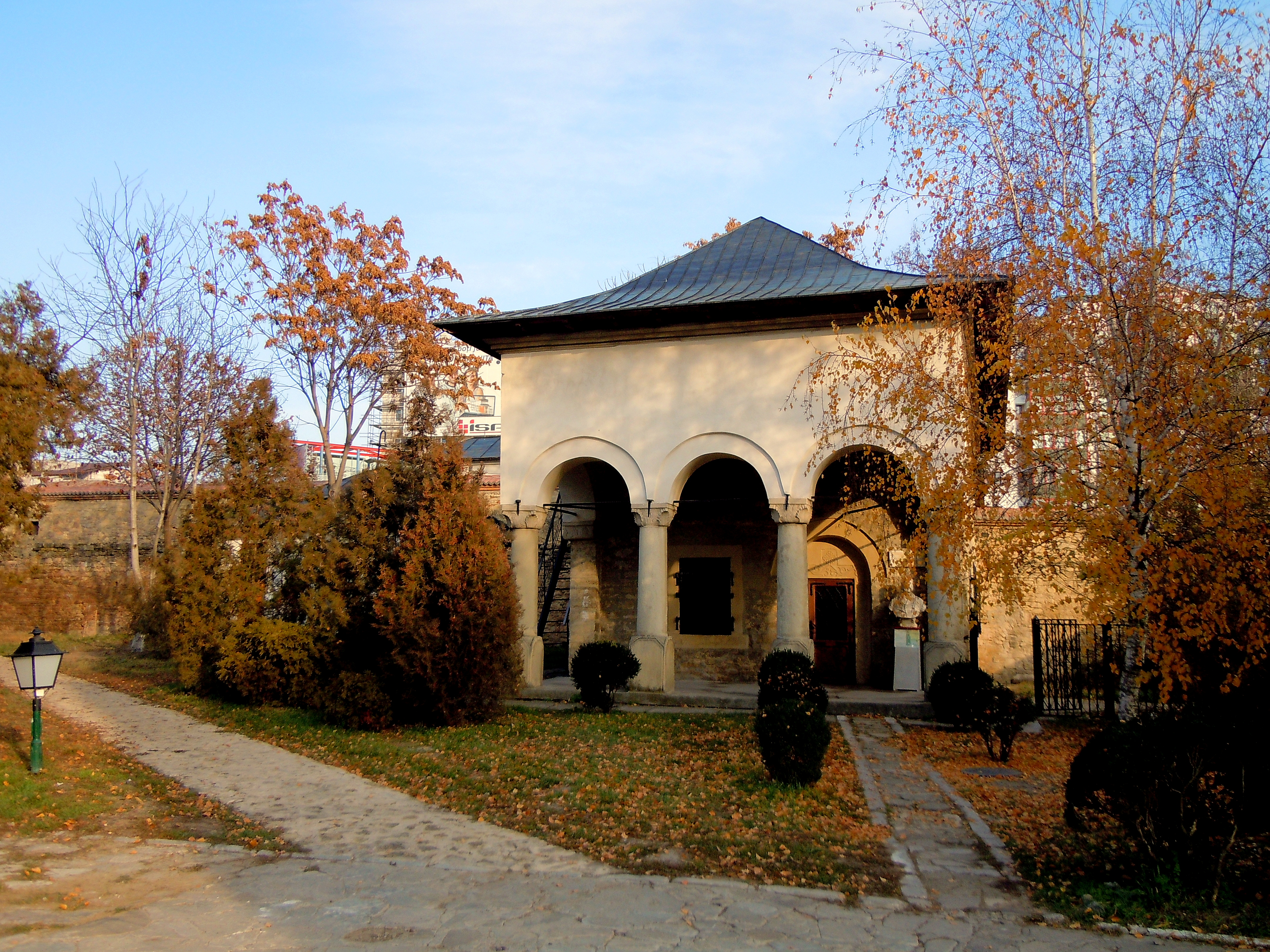
Ion Creangă's home (present-day Creangă Museum) in Golia Monastery

By the second half of the 1860s, the future writer was also pursuing an interest in politics, which eventually led him to rally with the more nationalist group within the Romanian liberal current, known as Free and Independent Faction. An agitator for his party, Creangă became commonly known under the nickname Popa Smântână ("Priest Sour Cream"). In April 1866, shortly after Domnitor Cuza was toppled by a coup, and just before Carol I was selected to replace him, the Romanian Army intervened to quell a separatist riot in Iași, instigated by Moldavian Metropolitan Calinic Miclescu. It is likely that Creangă shared the outlook of other Factionalists, according to which secession was preferable to Carol's rule, and was probably among the rioters. At around the same time, he began circulating antisemitic tracts, and is said to have demanded that Christians boycott Jewish business. He is thought to have coined the expression Nici un ac de la jidani ("Not even a needle from the kikes"). He was eventually selected as one of the Factionalist candidates for an Iași seat in the Romanian Deputies' Chamber, as documented by the memoirs of his conservative rival, Iacob Negruzzi. The episode is supposed to have taken place at the earliest during the 1871 suffrage.

By 1868, Creangă's rebellious stance was irritating his hierarchical superiors, and, according to Călinescu, his consecutive actions show that he was "going out of his way for scandal". He was initially punished for attending a Iași Theater performance, as well as for defiantly claiming that there was "nothing scandalous or demoralizing" in what he had seen, and reportedly further antagonized the monks by firing a gun to scare off the rooks nesting on his church. The latter incident, which some commentators believe fabricated by Creangă's detractors, was judged absurd by the ecclesiastical authorities, who had been further alarmed by negative reporting in the press. When told that no clergyman other than him had been seen using a gun, Creangă issued a reply deemed "Nasreddinesque" by George Călinescu, maintaining that, unlike others, he was not afraid of doing so. Confronted by Metropolitan Calinic himself, Creangă allegedly argued that he could think of no other way to eliminate rooks, being eventually pardoned by the prelate when it was ruled that he had not infringed on canon law.

=== Defrocking and the Bojdeuca years ===
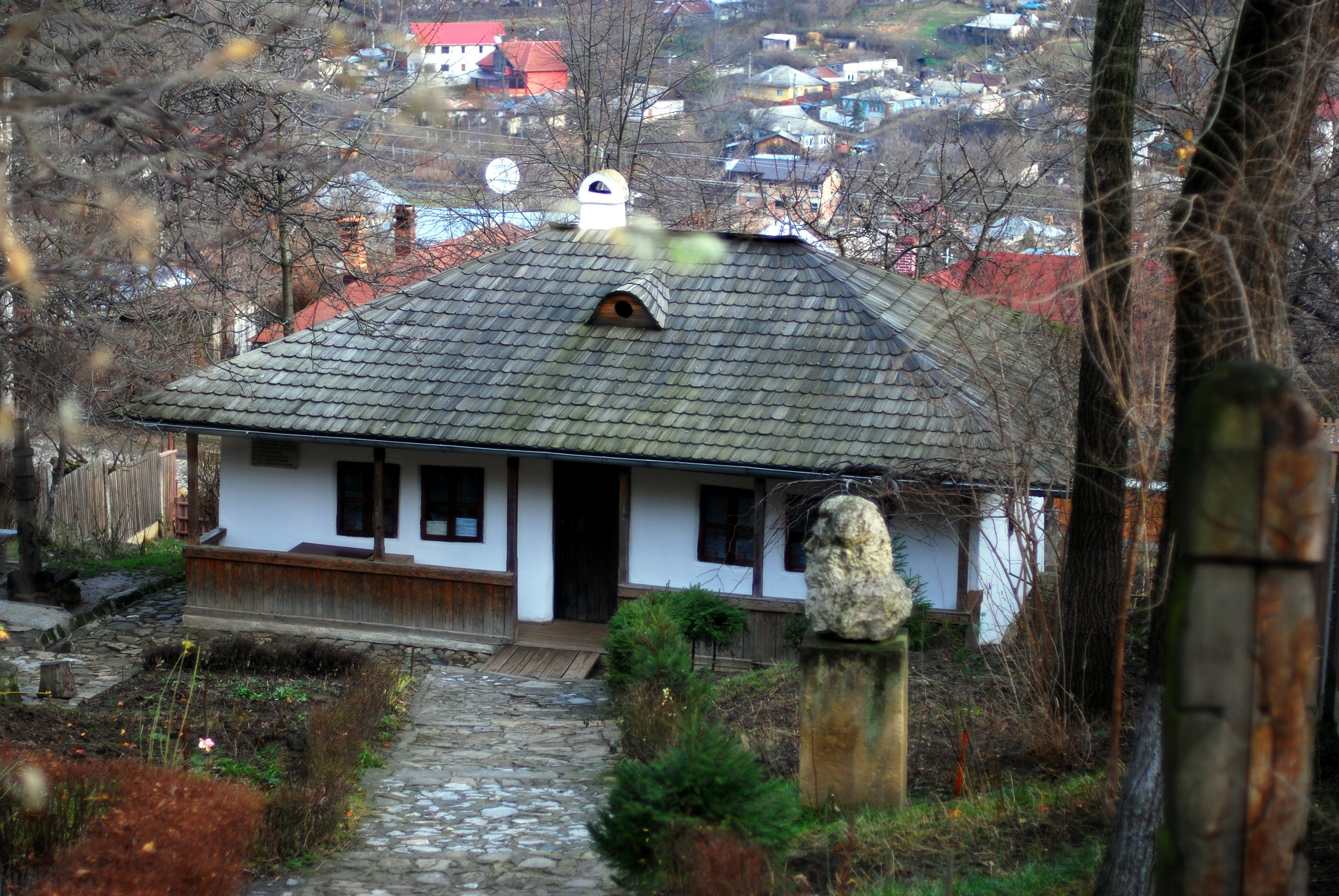
Creangă's Bojdeuca in Iași

Creangă eventually moved out of the monastery, but refused to relinquish his key to the church basement, and, in what was probably a modernizing intent, chopped off his long hair, one of the traditional marks of an Orthodox priest. The latter gesture scandalized his superiors, particularly since Creangă explained himself using an ancient provision of canon law, which stipulated that priests were not supposed to grow their hair long. After some assessment, his superiors agreed not to regard this action as more than a minor disobedience. He was temporarily suspended in practice but, citing an ambiguity in the decision (which could be read as a banishment in perpetuity), Creangă considered himself defrocked. He relinquished his clerical clothing altogether and began wearing lay clothes everywhere, a matter which caused public outrage.

By then a teacher at the 1st School for Boys, on Română Street, Creangă was ordered out of his secular assignment in July 1872, when news of his status and attitude reached Education Minister Christian Tell. Upset by the circumstances, and objecting in writing on grounds that it did not refer to his teaching abilities, he fell back on income produced by a tobacconist's shop he had established shortly before being dismissed. This stage marked a final development in Creangă's conflict with the church hierarchy. Summoned to explain why he was living the life of a shopkeeper, he responded in writing by showing his unwillingness to apologize, and indicated that he would only agree to face secular courts. The virulent text notably accused the church officials of being his enemies on account of his "independence, sincerity, honesty" in supporting the cause of "human dignity". After the gesture of defiance, the court recommended his defrocking, its decision being soon after confirmed by the synod.

In the meantime, Creangă moved into what he called Bojdeuca (or Bujdeuca, both being Moldavian regional speech for "tiny hut"), a small house located on the outskirts of Iași. Officially divorced in 1873, he was living there with his lover Ecaterina "Tinca" Vartic. A former laundress who had earlier leased one of the Bojdeuca rooms, she shared Creangă's peasant-like existence. This lifestyle implied a number of eccentricities, such as the former deacon's practice of wearing loose shirts throughout summer and bathing in a natural pond. His voracious appetite, called "proverbial gluttony" by George Călinescu, was attested by contemporary accounts. These depict him consuming uninterrupted successions of whole meals on a daily basis.

In May 1874, soon after taking over Minister of Education in the Conservative Party cabinet of Lascăr Catargiu, his friend Maiorescu granted Creangă the position of schoolteacher in the Iași area of Păcurari. During the same period, Ion Creangă met and became best friends with Mihai Eminescu, posthumously celebrated as Romania's national poet. This is said to have taken place in summer 1875, when Eminescu was working as an inspector for Maiorescu's Education Ministry, overseeing schools in Iași County: reportedly, Eminescu was fascinated with Creangă's talents as a raconteur, while the latter admired Eminescu for his erudition.

=== Junimea reception ===
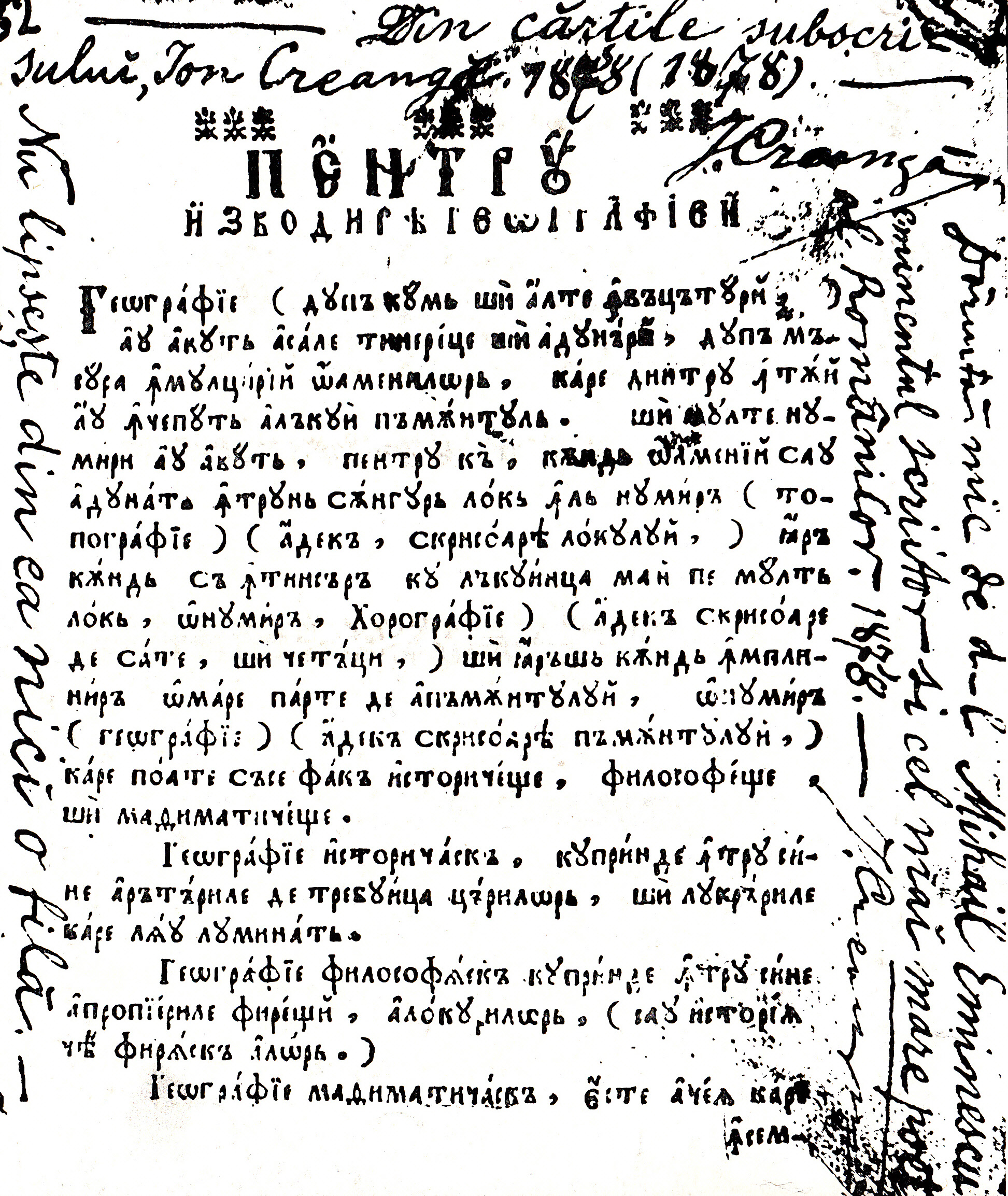
Page from a Romanian Cyrillic book in Creangă's collection. Creangă's 1878 marginalia identify it as a gift from Mihai Eminescu, referred to as "the eminent writer and the greatest poet among Romanians"

At around the same time, Creangă also began attending Junimea, an upper class literary club presided upon by Maiorescu, whose cultural and political prestige was increasing. This event, literary historian Z. Ornea argued, followed a time of indecision: as a former Factionalist, Creangă was a natural adversary of the mainstream Junimist "cosmopolitan orientation", represented by both Maiorescu and Negruzzi, but was still fundamentally committed to Maiorescu's agenda in the field of education. Literary historians Carmen-Maria Mecu and Nicolae Mecu also argue that, after attending Junimea, the author was able to assimilate some of its innovative teachings into his own style of pedagogy, and thus helped diffuse its message outside the purely academic environment.

The exact date of his reception is a mystery. According to Maiorescu's own recollections, written some decades after the event, Creangă was in attendance at a Junimea meeting of 1871, during which Gheorghe Costaforu proposed to transform the club into a political party. The information was considered dubious by Z. Ornea, who argued that the episode may have been entirely invented by the Junimist leader, and noted that it contradicted both Negruzzi's accounts and minutes kept by A. D. Xenopol. According to Ornea's assessment, with the exception of literary critic Vladimir Streinu, all of Creangă's biographers have come to dismiss Maiorescu's statement. Several sources mention that the future writer was introduced to the society by Eminescu, who was an active member around 1875. This and other details lead Ornea to conclude that membership was granted to Creangă only after the summer break of 1875.

Gradually or instantly, Creangă made a positive impression by confirming with the Junimist ideal of authenticity. He also became treasured for his talkative and jocular nature, self-effacing references to himself as a "peasant", and eventually his debut works, which became subjects of his own public readings. His storytelling soon earned him dedicated spectators, who deemed Creangă's fictional universe a "sack of wonders" at a time when the author himself had started casually using the pseudonym Ioan Vântură-Țară ("Ioan Gadabout"). Although still in his forties, the newcomer was also becoming colloquially known to his colleagues as Moș Creangă ("Old Man Creangă" or "Father Creangă"), which was a sign of respect and sympathy. Among Ion Creangă's most dedicated promoters were Eminescu, his former political rival Iacob Negruzzi, Alexandru Lambrior and Vasile Pogor, as well as the so-called caracudă (roughly, "small game") section, which comprised Junimists who rarely took the floor during public debates, and who were avid listeners of his literary productions (it was to this latter gathering that Creangă later dedicated his erotic texts). In parallel to his diversified literary contribution, the former priest himself became a noted voice in Junimist politics, and, like his new friend Eminescu, voiced support for the group's nationalist faction, in disagreement with the more cosmopolitan and aristocratic segment led by Maiorescu and Petre P. Carp. By that the late 1870s, he was secretly redirecting political support from the former Factionalists to his new colleagues, as confirmed by an encrypted letter he addressed to Negruzzi in March 1877.

=== Literary consecration ===
Autumn 1875 is also often described as his actual debut in fiction prose, with "The Mother with Three Daughters-in-Law", a short story first publish in October by the club's magazine Convorbiri Literare. In all, Convorbiri Literare would publish 15 works of fiction and the four existing parts of his Childhood Memories before Creangă's death. Reportedly, the decision to begin writing down his stories had been the direct result of Eminescu's persuasion. His talent for storytelling and its transformation into writing fascinated his new colleagues. Several among them, including poet Grigore Alexandrescu, tasked experimental psychologist Eduard Gruber with closely studying Creangă's methods, investigations which produced a report evidencing Creangă's laborious and physical approach to the creative process. The latter also involved his frequent exchanges of ideas with Vartic, in whom he found his primary audience. In addition to his fiction writing, the emerging author followed Maiorescu's suggestion and, in 1876, published a work of educational methodology and the phonemic orthography favored by Junimea: Povățuitoriu la cetire prin scriere după sistema fonetică ("Guide to Reading by Writing in the Phonetic System"). It was supposed to become a standard textbook for the training of teachers, but was withdrawn from circulation soon afterward, when the Catargiu cabinet fell.

After losing his job as school inspector following the decisions of a hostile National Liberal executive, Mihai Eminescu spent much of his time in Bojdeuca, where he was looked after by the couple. For five months after quarreling with Samson Bodnărescu, his fellow poet and previous landlord, Eminescu even moved inside the house, where he reputedly pursued his discreet love affair with woman writer Veronica Micle, and completed as many as 22 of his poems. Creangă introduced his younger friend to a circle of companions which included Zahei Creangă, who was by then a cantor, as well as Răceanu, priest Gheorghe Ienăchescu, and clerk Nicșoi (all of whom, Călinescu notes, had come to share the raconteur's lifestyle choices and his nationalist opinions). Eminescu was especially attracted by their variant of simple life, the rudimentary setting of Creangă's house and the group's bohemian escapades. Circumstances drew the two friends apart: by 1877, Eminescu had relocated in Bucharest, the capital city, regularly receiving letters in which Creangă was asking him to return. He was however against Eminescu's plan to marry Veronica Micle, and made his objection known to the poet. In 1879, as a sign that he was formalizing his own affair with Tinca Vartic, Creangă purchased the Bojdeuca in her name, paying his former landlord 40 florins in exchange. That same year, he, Răceanu and Ienăchescu published the textbook Geografia județului Iași ("The Geography of Iași County"), followed soon after by a map of the same region, researched by Creangă and Răceanu. A final work in the area of education followed in 1880, as a schoolteacher's version of Maiorescu's study of Romanian grammar, Regulile limbei române ("Rules of the Romanian Language").

=== Illness and death ===
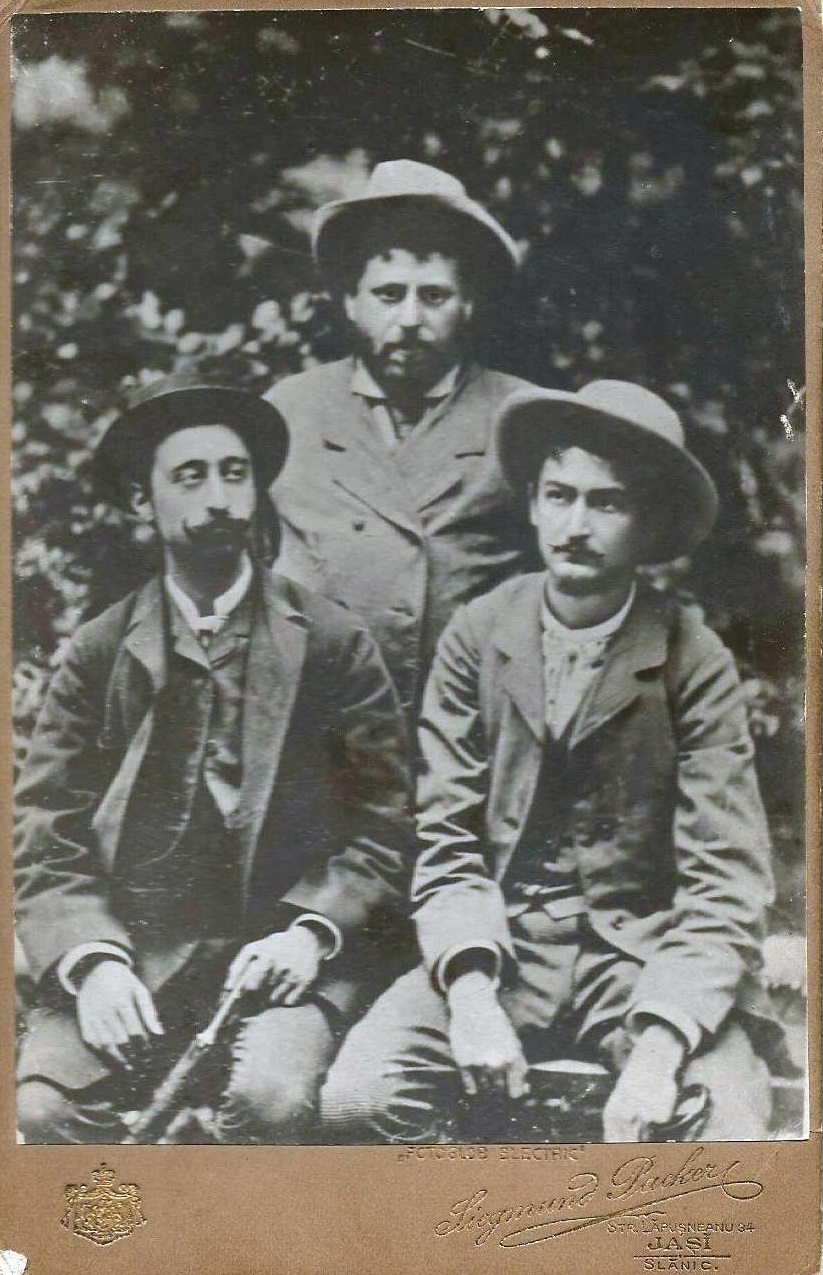
Creangă (top) with A. C. Cuza and N. A. Bogdan, during balneotherapy in Slănic-Moldova, 1885

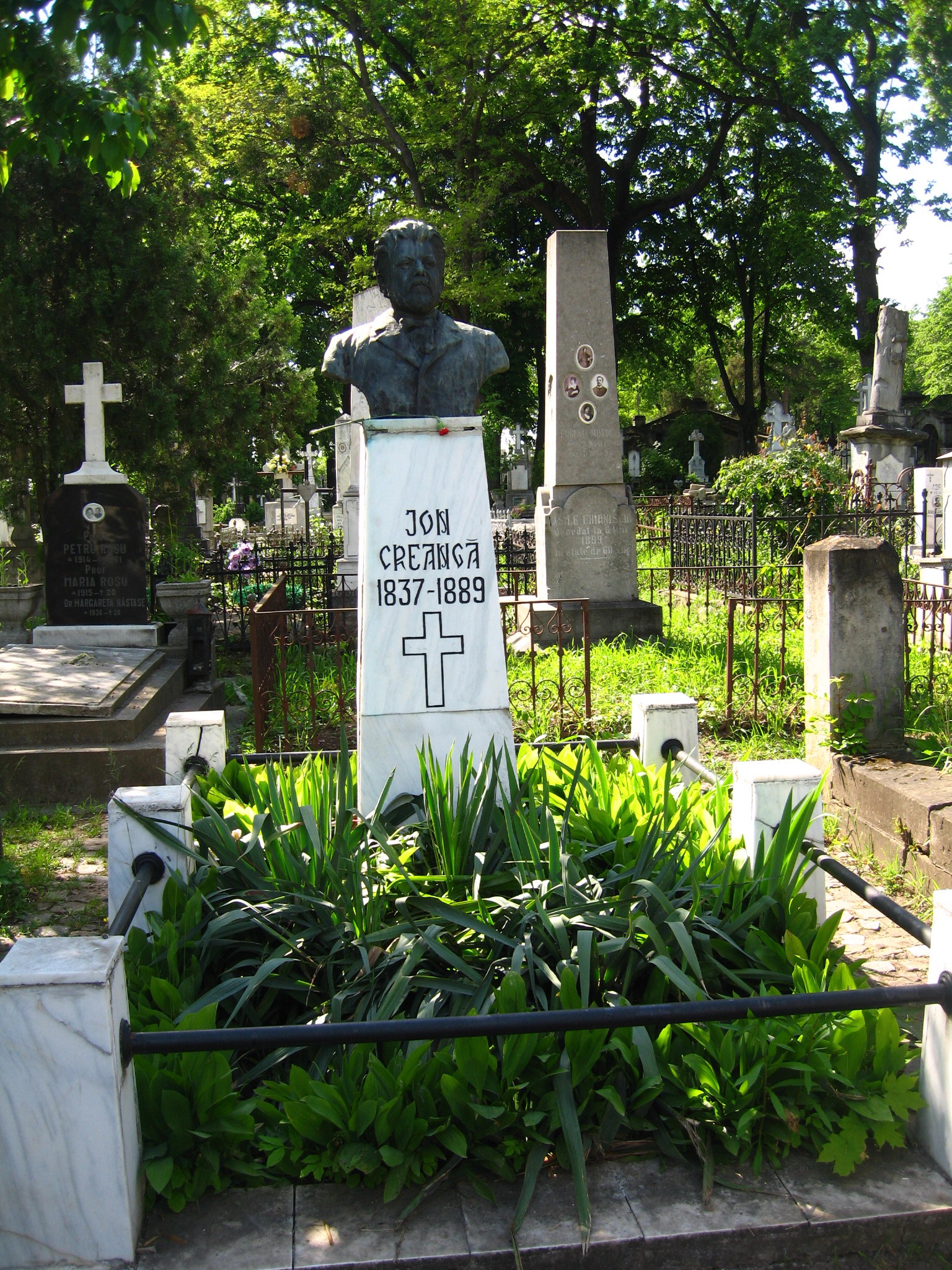
Creangă's grave in Eternitatea Cemetery, Iași

By the 1880s, Creangă had epilepsy with accelerated and debilitating episodes. He was also severely overweight, weighing some 120 kilograms (over 250 pounds), with a height of 1.85 meters (6 feet), and being teasingly nicknamed Burduhănosul ("Tubby") by his friends (although, according to testimonies by his son and daughter-in-law, he did not actually look his size).

Despite his activity being much reduced, he still kept himself informed about the polemics agitating Romania's cultural and political scene. He was also occasionally hosting Eminescu, witnessing his friend's struggle with mental disorder. The two failed to reconnect, and their relationship ended. After one of the meetings, he recorded that the delusional poet was carrying around a revolver with which to fend off unknown attackers—among the first in a series of episodes which ended with Eminescu's psychiatric confinement and death during June 1889. Around that time, Creangă, like other Junimists, was involved in a clash of ideas with the emerging Romanian socialist and atheistic group, rallied around Contemporanul magazine. This occurred after Contemporanul founder Ioan Nădejde publicly ridiculed Învățătoriul copiilor over its take on creationism, quoting its claim that "the invisible hand of God" was what made seeds grow into plants. Creangă replied with a measure of irony, stating that "had God not pierced the skin over our eyes, we would be unable to see each other's mistakes". Nevertheless, Călinescu argued, Nădejde's comments had shaken his adversary's religious sentiment, leading Creangă to question the immortality of the soul in a letter he addressed to one of his relatives in the clergy. According to other assessments, he was himself an atheist, albeit intimately so.

In 1887, the National Liberal Ministry of Dimitrie Sturdza removed Creangă from his schoolteacher's post, and he subsequently left for Bucharest in order to petition for his pension rights. Having hoped to be granted assistance by Maiorescu, he was disappointed when the Junimea leader would not respond to his request, and, during his final years, switched allegiance to the literary circle founded by Nicolae Beldiceanu (where he was introduced by Gruber). Among Creangă's last works was a fourth and final part of his Memories, most likely written during 1888. The book remained unfinished, as did the story Făt-frumos, fiul iepei ("Făt-Frumos, Son of the Mare"). He died after an epileptic crisis, on the last day of 1889, his body being buried in Iași's Eternitatea Cemetery. His funeral ceremony was attended by several of Iași's intellectuals (Vasile Burlă, A. C. Cuza, Dumitru Evolceanu, Nicolae Iorga and Artur Stavri among them).

== Work ==
=== Cultural context ===
The impact of Ion Creangă's work within its cultural context was originally secured by Junimea. Seeking to revitalize Romanian literature by recovering authenticity, and reacting against those cultural imports it deemed excessive, the group notably encouraged individual creativity among peasants. Reflecting back on Maiorescu's role in the process, George Călinescu wrote: "A literary salon where the personal merit would take the forefront did not exist [before Junimea] and, had Creangă been born two decades earlier, he would not have been able to present 'his peasant material' to anyone. Summoning the creativity of the peasant class and placing it in direct contact with the aristocrats is the work of Junimea." His cogenerationist and fellow literary historian Tudor Vianu issued a similar verdict, commenting: "Junimea is itself ... an aristocratic society. Nevertheless, it is through Junimea that surfaced the first gesture of transmitting a literary direction to some writers of rural extraction: a phenomenon of great importance, the neglect of which would render unexplainable the entire subsequent development of our literature." Also referring to cultural positioning within and outside the group, Carmen-Maria Mecu and Nicolae Mecu took the acceptance of "literate peasants" such as Creangă as exemplary proof of Junimist "diversity" and "tolerance".

Maiorescu is known to have had much appreciation for Creangă and other writers of peasant origin, such as Ion Popovici-Bănățeanu and Ioan Slavici. Late in life, he used this connection to challenge accusations of Junimist elitism in the face of criticism from more populist traditionalists. Nonetheless, Junimea members in general found Creangă more of an entertainer rather than a serious writer, and treasured him only to the measure where he illustrated their theories about the validity of rural literature as a source of inspiration for cultured authors. Therefore, Iacob Negruzzi sympathetically but controversially referred to his friend as "a primitive and uncouth talent". Maiorescu's critical texts also provide little individual coverage of Creangă's contributions, probably because these failed to comply exactly with his stratification of literary works into poporane ("popular", that is anonymous or collective) and otherwise. Tudor Vianu's theory defines Creangă as a prime representative of the "popular realism" guidelines (as sporadically recommended by the Junimist doyen himself), cautioning however that Creangă's example was never mentioned in such a context by Maiorescu personally.

Although he occasionally downplayed his own contribution to literature, Creangă himself was aware that his texts went beyond records of popular tradition, and made significant efforts to be recognized as an original author (by corresponding with fellow writers and willingly submitting his books to critical scrutiny). Vianu commented at length on the exact relationship between the narrative borrowed from oral tradition and Creangă's "somewhat surreptitious" method of blending his own style into the folkloric standard, likening it to the historical process whereby local painters improvised over the strict canons of Byzantine art. Creangă's complex take on individuality and the art of writing was attested by his own foreword to an edition of his collected stories, in which he addressed the reader directly: "You may have read many stupid things since you were put on this Earth. Please read these as well, and where it should be that they don't agree with you, take hold of a pen and come up with something better, for this is all I could see myself doing and did."

An exception among Junimea promoters was Eminescu, himself noted for expressing a dissenting social perspective which only partly mirrored Maiorescu's take on conservatism. According to historian Lucian Boia, the "authentic Moldavian peasant" that was Creangă also complemented Eminescu's own "more metaphysical" peasanthood. Similarly, Z. Ornea notes that the poet used Creangă's positions to illustrate his own ethnonationalist take on Romanian culture, and in particular his claim that rural authenticity lay hidden by a "superimposed stratum" of urbanized ethnic minorities. 20th century critics have described Creangă as one of his generation's most accomplished figures, and a leading exponent of Junimist literature. This verdict is found in several of Vianu's texts, which uphold Creangă as a great exponent of his generation's literature, comparable to fellow Junimea members Eminescu, Slavici and Ion Luca Caragiale. This view complements George Călinescu's definition, placing the Moldavian author in the company of Slavici and Caragiale as one of the "great prose writers" of the 1880s. Lucian Boia, who noted that "the triad of Romanian classics" includes Creangă alongside Eminescu and Caragiale, also cautioned that, compared to the other two (with whom "the Romanians have said almost all there is to say about themselves"), Creangă has "a rather more limited register".

The frequent comparison between Creangă and Caragiale in particular is seen by Vianu as stemming from both their common "wide-ranging stylistic means" and their complementary positions in relations to two superimposed phenomenons, with Caragiale's depiction of the petite bourgeoisie as the rough equivalent of Creangă's interest in the peasantry. The same parallelism is explained by Ornea as a consequence of the two authors' social outlook: "[Their works] have cemented aesthetically the portrayal of two worlds. Creangă's is the peasant world, Caragiale's the suburban and urban one. Two worlds which represent, in fact, two characteristic steps and two sociopolitical models in the evolution of Romanian structures which ... were confronting themselves in a process that would later prove decisive." According to the same commentator, the two plus Eminescu are their generation's great writers, with Slavici as one "in their immediate succession." While listing what he believes are elements bridging the works of Creangă and Caragiale, other critics have described as strange the fact that the two never appear to have mentioned each other, and stressed that, although not unlikely, a direct encounter between them was never recorded in sources.

=== Narrative style and language ===
Highlighting Ion Creangă's recourse to the particularities of Moldavian regionalisms and archaisms, their accumulation making Creangă's work very difficult to translate, George Călinescu reacted against claims that the narratives reflected antiquating patterns. He concluded that, in effect, Creangă's written language was the equivalent of a "glossological museum", and even contrasted by the writer's more modern everyday parlance. Also discussing the impression that Creangă's work should be read with a Moldavian accent, noted for its "softness of sound" in relation to standard Romanian phonology, Călinescu cautioned against interpretative exaggerations, maintaining that the actual texts only offer faint suggestions of regional pronunciation. Contrasting Creangă with the traditions of literature produced by Wallachians in what became the standard literary language, Călinescu also argued in favor of a difference in mentality: the "balance" evidenced by Moldavian speech and illustrated in Ion Creangă's writings is contrasted by the "discoloration and roughness" of "Wallachianism". He also criticized those views according to which Creangă's variant of the literary language was "beautiful", since it failed to "please everyone on account of some acoustical beauty", and since readers from outside the writer's native area could confront it "with some irritation." For Călinescu, the result nevertheless displays "an enormous capacity of authentic speech", also found in the works of Caragiale and, in the 20th century, Mihail Sadoveanu. According to the same commentator, the dialectical interventions formed a background to a lively vocabulary, a "hermetic" type of "argot", which contained "hilarious double entendres and indecent onomatopoeia", passing from "erudite beauty" to "obscene laughter". Some of the expressions characteristic of Creangă's style are obscure in meaning, and some other, such as "drought made the snake scream inside the frog's mouth", appear to be spontaneous and nonsensical. Another specific trait of this language, commented upon by Vianu's and compared by him to the aesthetics of Classicism, sees much of Creangă's prose being set to a discreet poetic meter.

The recourse to oral literature schemes made it into his writings, where it became a defining trait. As part of this process, Călinescu assessed, "Creangă acts as all his characters in turn, for his stories are almost entirely spoken. ... When Creangă recounts, the composition is not extraordinary, but once his heroes begin talking, their gesticulation and wording reach a height in typical storytelling." According to the critic, discovering this "fundamental" notion about Creangă's work was the merit of literary historian and Viața Românească editor Garabet Ibrăileanu, who had mentioned it as a main proof of affiliation to realism. The distinctive manner of characterization through "realistic dialogues" is seen by Vianu as a highly personal intervention and indicator of the Moldavian writer's originality. Both Vianu and Călinescu discussed this trait, together with the technique of imparting subjective narration in-between characters' replies, as creating other meeting points between Creangă and his counterpart Caragiale. Partly replicating in paper the essence of social gatherings, Ion Creangă often tried to transpose the particular effects of oral storytelling into writing. Among these characteristic touches were interrogations addressed to the readers as imaginary listeners, and pausing for effect with the visual aid of ellipsis. He also often interrupted his narratives with concise illustrations of his point, often in verse form, and usually introduced by vorba ceea (an expression literally meaning "that word", but covering the sense of "as word goes around"). One example of this connects the notions of abundance and personal satisfaction:

De plăcinte râde gura,
De vărzare și mai tare.

Translation:

The mouth will laugh for pie,
It will laugh even harder for cabbage pie.

In other cases, the short riddles relate to larger themes, such as divine justification for one's apparent fortune:

Dă-mi, Doamne, ce n-am avut,
Să mă mir ce m-a găsit.

Translation:

Lord, give me that I did not own,
So that I may marvel at things having found me.

=== Creangă's specificity ===
Despite assuming the external form of traditional literature, Ion Creangă's interests and creative interventions, Călinescu noted, separated him from his roots: "peasants do not have [his] entirely cultured gifts. ... Too much 'atmosphere', too much dialogic 'humor', too much polychromy at the expense of linear epic movements. The peasant wants the bare epic and desires the unreal." The commentator passed a similar judgment on the author's use of ancient sayings, concluding that, instead of crystallizing and validating local folklore, the accounts appeal to cultured tastes, having as the generation of comedy and volubility as their main purpose. According to Vianu's assessment Creangă was "a supreme artist" whose use of "typical sayings" attests "a man of the people, but not an anonymous and impersonal sample." These verdicts, directly contradicting Junimist theories, were mirrored by several other 20th century exegetes belonging to distinct schools of thought: Pompiliu Constantinescu, Benjamin Fondane and Ion Negoițescu. Writing during the second half of the century, critic Nicolae Manolescu passed a similar judgment, believing that Creangă was motivated by a "strictly intellectual sensuousness" and the notion that "pleasure arises from gratuitousness", while Manolescu's colleague Mircea Braga referred to "the great secret of the man who has managed to transfer unaltered the code of popular creativity into the immanence of the cultured one." In Braga's assessment, this synthesis managed "the impossible", but the difficulty of repeating it with each story also resulted in mediocre writings: "from among his few texts, even fewer are located on the relatively highest level of the relative aesthetic hierarchy".

Călinescu viewed such intellectual traits as shared by Creangă with his Wallachian counterpart Anton Pann, in turn linking both writers to the satirical component of Renaissance literature, and specifically to François Rabelais. Within local tradition, the literary historian saw a symbolic connection between Creangă and the early 18th century figure, Ion Neculce, one of Moldavia's leading chroniclers. While he made his own comparison between Creangă and Pann, Tudor Vianu concluded that the Moldavian writer was in fact superior, as well as being more relevant to literature than Petre Ispirescu, the prime collector of tales in 19th-century Wallachia. Also making use of the Rabelais analogy, literary chronicler Gabriela Ursachi found another analogy in local letters: Ion Budai-Deleanu, an early 19th-century representative of the Transylvanian School, whose style mixes erudite playfulness with popular tastes. These contextual traits, researchers assess, did not prevent Creangă's overall work from acquiring a universal aspect, particularly since various of his writings use narrative sequences common throughout world literature.

George Călinescu also assessed that these literary connections served to highlight the elevated nature of Creangă's style, his "erudite device", concluding: "Writers such as Creangă can only show up in places where the word is ancient and equivocal, and where experience has been condensed into unchanging formulas. It would have been more natural for such a prose writer to have emerged a few centuries later, into an era of Romanian humanism. Born much earlier, Creangă showed up where there exists an ancient tradition, and therefore a species of erudition, ... in a mountain village ... where the people is unmixed and keeping [with tradition]." Outlining his own theory about the aspects of "national specificity" in Romanian letters, he expanded on these thoughts, listing Creangă and Eminescu as "core Romanians" who illustrated a "primordial note", complemented by the "southern" and "Balkan" group of Caragiale and others. Claiming that the "core" presence had "not primitive, but ancient" origins, perpetuated by "stereotyped wisdom" and "energetic fatalism", he asserted: "Creangă shows our civilization's contemporaneity with the world's oldest civilizations, our Asian age." The alternating national and regional characteristics in Creangă's writings are related by historian Neagu Djuvara with the writer's place of birth, an affluent village in an isolated region, contrasting heavily with the 19th century Wallachian countryside: "if the mud hut villages of the Danube flood plain are to be taken into account, one finds himself in a different country." Ornea, who noted that Eminescu effectively shared Creangă's worldview, believed the latter to have been dominated by nostalgia for a world of independent landowning peasants, and argued that Creangă's literary and political outlook were both essentially conservative. Ornea commented: "One could say that it was through [this form of nostalgia] that the writer debuted and that, within the space of his work it became, in its own right, an expression of the world that was about to vanish." Commenting on Creangă's "robust realism" and lack of "sentimentality", Vianu contrarily asserted: "Creangă's nostalgia ... has an individual, not social, sense."

The witty and playful side of Creangă's personality, which became notorious during his time at Junimea and constituted a significant part of his appeal, was reflected into a series of anecdotes. These accounts detail his playing the ignorant in front of fellow Junimists in order not to antagonize sides during literary debates (notably, by declaring himself "for against" during a two-option vote), his irony in reference to his own admirers (such as when he asked two of them to treasure the photograph of himself in the middle and the two of them on either side, while comparing it to the crucifixion scene and implicitly assigning them the role of thieves), and his recourse to puns and proverbs which he usually claimed to be citing from oral tradition and the roots of Romanian humor. The latter habit was notably illustrated by his answer to people who would ask him for money: "not since I born was I as poor as I was poor yesterday and the day before yesterday and last week and last week and throughout life". His joyfulness complemented his overall Epicureanism and his gourmand habits: his accounts are often marked by a special interest in describing acts related to food and drink. Overall, Eduard Gruber's report contended, Creangă's writing relied on him being "a strong sensual and auditive type", and a "very emotional" person.

Ion Creangă's sense of humor was instrumental in forging the unprecedented characteristics of his work. American critic Ruth S. Lamb, the writer's style merges "the rich vocabulary of the Moldavian peasant" with "an original gaiety and gusto comparable to that of Rabelais." According to George Călinescu: "[Creangă] got the idea that he was a clever man, like all men of the people, and therefore used irony to make himself seem stupid." In Călinescu's view, the author's antics had earned him a status equivalent to that of his Wallachian Junimist counterpart Caragiale, with the exception that the latter found his inspiration in urban settings, matching "Nasreddinisms" with "Miticism". Z. Ornea sees the main protagonists in Creangă's comedic narratives as, in effect, "particularized incarnations of the same symbolic character", while the use of humor itself reflects the traditional mindset, "a survival through intelligence, that of a people with an old history, whose life experience has for centuries been concentrated into gestures and words."

=== Most prominent tales ===
Part of Ion Creangă's contribution to the short story, fantasy and children's literature genres involved collecting and transforming narratives circulating throughout his native region, which intertwine with his characteristic storytelling to the point where they become original contributions. According to Călinescu, the traditional praise for Ion Creangă as a creator of literary types is erroneous, since his characters primarily answered to ancient and linear narrative designs. The conclusion is partly shared by Braga, who links Creangă's tales to ethnological and anthropological takes on the themes and purposes of fairy tales, postulating the prevalence of three ancient and related narrative pretexts throughout his contributions: the preexistence of a "perturbing situation" (attributable to fatality), the plunging of the hero into a rite of passage-type challenge, a happy ending which brings the triumph of good over evil (often as a brutal and uncompromising act). Like their sources and predecessors in folklore, these accounts also carry transparent morals, ranging from the regulation of family life to meditations about destiny and lessons about tolerating the marginals. However, Swedish researcher Tom Sandqvist argues, they also illustrate the absurdist vein of some traditional narratives, by featuring "grotesqueries" and "illogical surprises".

With "The Goat and Her Three Kids", written mainly as a picturesque illustration of motherly love, Creangă produced a fable in prose, opposing the eponymous characters, caricatures of a garrulous but hard-working woman and her restless sons, to the sharp-toothed Big Bad Wolf, a satirical depiction of the cunning and immoral stranger. The plot shows the wolf making his way into the goat's house, where he eats the two older and less obedient kids, while the youngest one manages to escape by hiding up the chimney—the symbolism of which was psychoanalyzed by Dan Grădinaru, who claims it constitutes an allusion to Creangă's own childhood. The dénouement sees an inversion of the natural roles, an episode which, ethnologist Șerban Anghelescu notes, is dominated by "the culinary fire": the goat exercises her brutal revenge by trapping and slowly cooking the predator. This approach partly resonates with that of "The Mother with Three Daughters-in-Law", in which Creangă makes ample use of a traditional theme in Romanian humor, which portrays mothers-in-law as mean, stingy and oppressive characters. The embodiment of such offensive traits, she is also shown to be ingenious, pretending that she has a hidden third eye which always keeps things under watch. The narrator sides with the three young women in depicting their violent retribution, showing them capturing their oppressor, torturing her until she is left speech impaired, and leaving her on the brink of death. The mother-in-law's end turns into a farce: the eldest and most intelligent of the killers manipulates her victim's dying sounds into a testament partitioning her wealth, and a thin decorum is maintained at the funeral ceremony by the daughters' hypocritical sobbing.

"The Story of the Pig" partly illustrates the notion that parental love subdues even physical repulsion, showing an elderly peasant couple cherishing their adopted porcine son, who, unbeknown to them, is enchanted. The creature instantly offsets his parents' sadness and immobility by his witty intelligence. Having applied his perseverance and spells to erect a magical bridge, the piglet fulfills the requirement for marrying the emperor's daughter, after which it is uncovered that he is a Făt-Frumos or Prince Charming character who assumes his real identity only by night. Although the plot is supposed to deal with imperial magnificence in fairy tale fashion, the setting is still primarily rural, and the court itself is made to look like an elevated peasant community. According to researcher Marcu Beza, the text is, outside of its humorous context, a distant reworking of ancient legends such as Cupid and Psyche. The story introduces three additional characters, old women who assess and reward the efforts of the virtuous: Holy Wednesday, Holy Friday and Holy Sunday. They represent a mix of Christian and pagan traditions, by being both personifications of the liturgical calendar and fairy-like patrons of the wilderness (zâne).

A similar perspective was favored by "The Old Man's Daughter and the Old Woman's Daughter". Here, the theme echoes Cinderella, but, according to Călinescu, the rural setting provides a sharp contrast to the classical motif. Persecuted by her stepmother and stepsister, the kind and loving daughter of the old man is forced into a position of servitude reflecting the plight of many peasant women in Creangă's lifetime. In this case, the old man is negatively depicted as cowardly and entirely dominated by his mean wife. The focal point of the narrative is the meeting between the good daughter and Holy Sunday. The latter notices and generously rewards the girl's helpful nature and mastery of cooking; in contrast, when her envious sister attempts the same and fails, she ends up being eaten by serpent-like creatures (balauri). The happy ending sees the good girl marrying not Prince Charming, but a simple man described as "kind and industrious"—this outcome, Călinescu assessed, did not in effect spare the old man's daughter from a life of intense labor. A story very similar to "The Old Man's Daughter ..." is "The Purse a' Tuppence", which teaches that greed can shatter families, while offering symbolic retribution to men who are unhappy in marriage. The old man's rooster, chased away by the old woman for being unproductive, ends up amassing a huge fortune, which he keeps inside his belly and regurgitates back into the courtyard; the jealous old woman ends up killing her favorite hen, who has failed in replicating the rooster's feat.

=== Devil-themed stories and "Harap Alb" ===
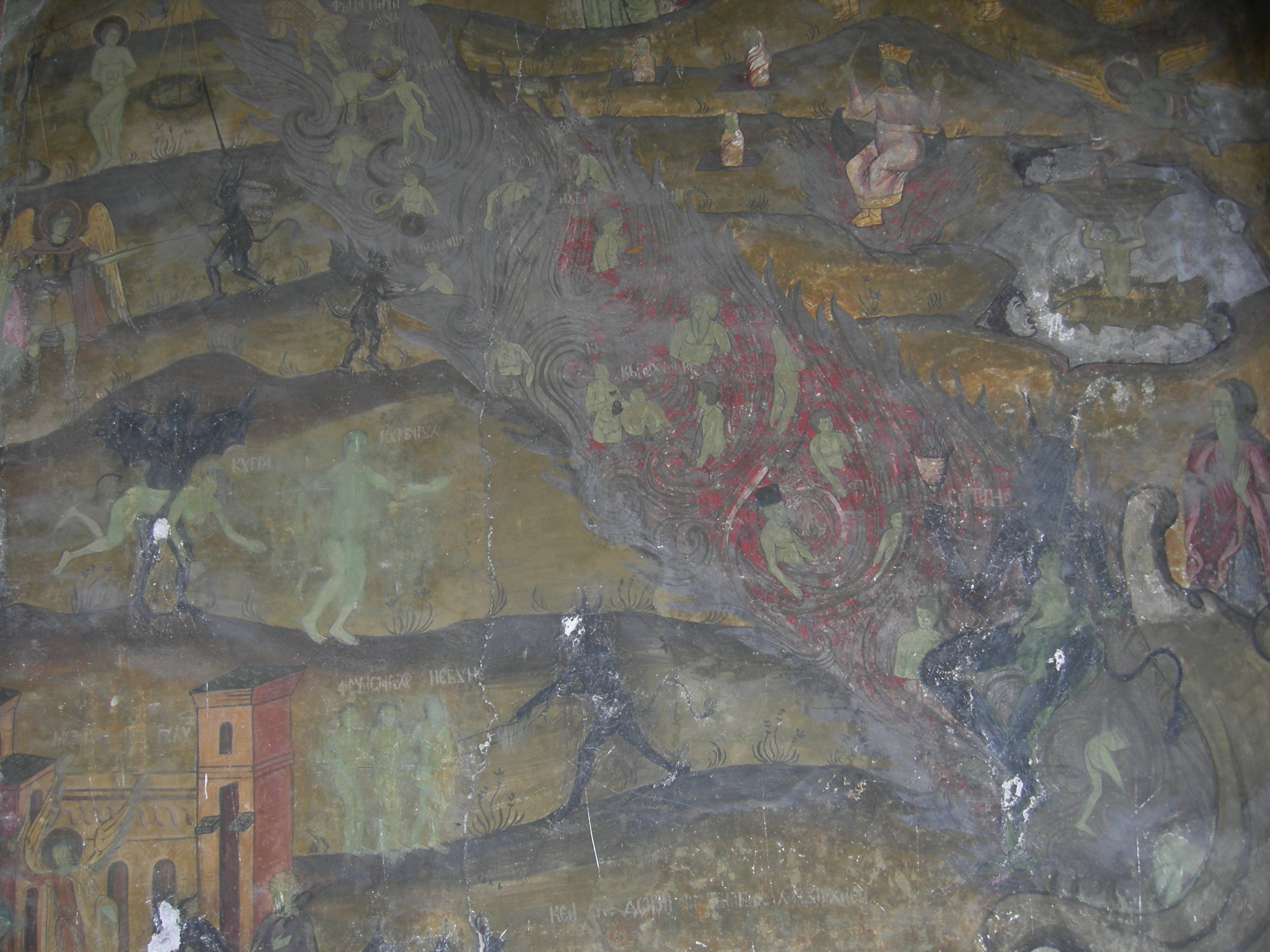
Depiction of Hell in an 18th-century Romanian Orthodox mural (Sfântul Elefterie Vechi, Bucharest)

Several of Creangă's characteristic novellas are infused with themes from Christian mythology, fictionalizing God, Saint Peter and the army of devils, most often with the comedic intent of showing such personages behaving like regular people. A defining story in this series is "Dănilă Prepeleac", whose eponymous peasant hero is characterized by what Șerban Anghelescu calls "idiocy serving to initiate", or, according to Gabriela Ursachi, "complete, and therefore sublime, stupidity." The first part of the story shows Dănilă exchanging his oxen for an empty bag—a set of dialogues which, George Călinescu argued, is almost exactly like a comedy play. In what was described as a complete reversal in characterization, the hero uses intelligence and ruse to trick and frighten several devils. Contrarily, "Stan Pățitul" shows its hero fraternizing with a lesser demon. Following the opening episode, in which the latter accidentally eats a bit of mămăligă dedicated by Stan to those who honor God, Satan himself condemns his subordinate to service the peasant. Călinescu highlights the naturalness of exchanges between the two protagonists, the latter of whom assumes the endearing form of a frail boy, Chirică, who ends up moving in with Stan and entering his service. The writing was also noted for other realistic elements alluding to everyday life, such as the overtly colloquial exchange between Chirică and Satan, or the episodes in which the young devil helps Stan woo a peasant woman. Although relatively young, Stan himself is referred to as stătut ("frowzy" or "lacking in freshness"), and the wording reflects rural attitudes about men who fail to marry during a certain age interval. Toward the end, the story focuses on a corrupt old woman who tries to trick Stan's new wife into committing adultery, but fails and is banished to the remotest area of Hell. Viewed by Călinescu as Creangă's "most original manner of dealing with the fabulous", and paralleled by him with Caragiale's Kir Ianulea on account of its realist approach to the supernatural, "Stan Pățitul" is, according to Vianu, untraceable in its inspiration: "[its] folk origin could not be identified, but it is not dismissible".

Another account in this series is "Ivan Turbincă", whose protagonist, a Russian serviceman, is shown rebelling against Heaven and Hell, and ultimately accomplishing the human ideal of cheating Death. The plot retells a theme present in both Romanian tradition and Ukrainian folklore, while, according to researcher of children's literature Muguraș Constantinescu, the main character is similar to German tradition's Till Eulenspiegel. In the beginning of the account, God rewards the soldier's exemplary charity by granting him a pouch (turbincă), which can miraculously trap anything in existence. In order to circumvent the laws of nature, Ivan subsequently makes use of both his magical item and his innate shrewdness. In one such episode, pretending not to understand the proper position of bodies inside a coffin, he tricks impatient Death into taking his place, and traps her inside. Eventually, he is allowed to keep his life, but is promised an eternity of old age, which he ingeniously counterbalances by attending an endless succession of wedding parties, and therefore never having to feel sad.

"Harap Alb", one of Ion Creangă's most complex narratives, carries a moral defined by Călinescu as "the gifted man will earn a reputation under any guise." The story opens with a coming of age quest, handed down by a king to his three sons: the most fit among them is supposed to reach the court of the Green Emperor, who is the king's brother, and succeed him to the throne. According to Călinescu, the mission bases itself on travels undertaken by young men in Creangă's native region, while the subsequent episodes in the narrative reinforce the impression of familiarity, from the "peasant speech" adopted by the villain known as the Bald Man, to the "crass vulgarity" evidenced by the antagonist Red Emperor. Forced to pass himself off as a foreign servant (or "Moor"), the prince is three times tested and aided by Holy Sunday, who doubles as the queen of zâne creatures. Călinescu described as "playful realism" the method through which Creangă outlined the mannerisms of several other characters, in particular the allegorical creatures who provide the youngest prince with additional and serendipitous assistance. In one noted instance, the characters Setilă ("Drink-All") and Flămânzilă ("Eat-All") help the hero overcome seemingly impossible tasks set by the Red Emperor, by ingesting unnaturally huge amounts of food and drink.

The tale builds on intricate symbolism stemming from obscure sources. It features what Muguraș Constantinescu calls "the most complex representation of Holy Sunday", with mention of her isolated and heavenly abode on "flower island". A background antithesis opposes the two fictional monarchs, with the Red Emperor replicating an ancient tradition which attributes malignant characteristics to the color. By contrast, the Green Emperor probably illustrates the ideals of vitality and healthy lifestyle, as hinted by his culinary preference for "lettuce from the garden of the bear". Historian Adrian Majuru, building on earlier observations made by linguist Lazăr Șăineanu, also connects the servant-prince's antagonists with various reflections of ethnic strife in Romanian folklore: the Red Emperor as standing for the medieval Khazars ("Red Jews"), the Bald Man as a popular view of the Tatars.

=== Childhood Memories ===
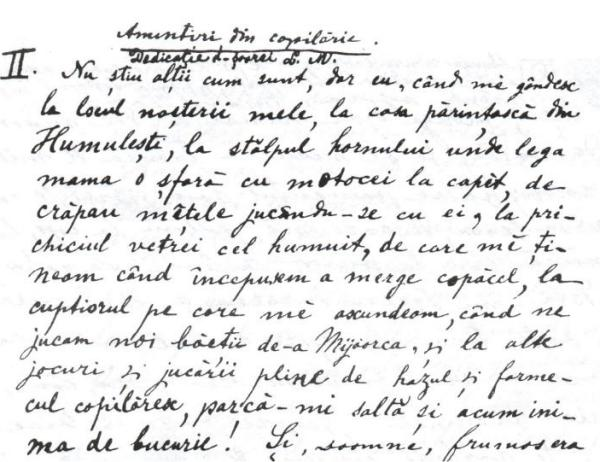
The second part of Childhood Memories in manuscript form, introductory paragraphs

Childhood Memories is, together with a short story about his teacher Isaia Teodorescu (titled "Popa Duhu"), one of Creangă's two memoirs. George Călinescu proposed that, like his fairy tales, the book illustrates popular narrative conventions, a matter accounting for their special place in literature: "The stories are true, but typical, without depth. Once retold with a different kind of gesticulation, the subject would lose all of its lively atmosphere." Also based on the techniques of traditional oral accounts, it features the topical interventions of a first-person narrator in the form of soliloquies, and reflects in part the literary canon set by frame stories. The resulting effect, Călinescu argued, was not that of "a confession or a diary", but that of a symbolic account depicting "the childhood of the universal child." According to Vianu, the text is especially illustrative of its author's "spontaneous passage" between the levels of "popular" and "cultured" literature: "The idea of fictionalizing oneself, of outlining one's formative steps, the steady accumulation of impressions from life, and then the sentiment of time, of its irreversible flow, of regret for all things lost in its consumption, of the charm relived through one's recollections are all thoughts, feelings and attitudes defining a modern man of culture. No popular model could have ever stood before Creangă when he was writing his Memories, but, surely, neither could the cultured prototypes of the genre, the first autobiographies and memoirs of the Renaissance". Grădinaru and essayist Mircea Moț analyzed the volume as a fundamentally sad text, in stated contrast with its common perception as a recollection of joyful moments: the former focused on moments which seem to depict Nică as a loner, the latter highlighted those sections which include Creangă's bitter musings about destiny and the impregnability of changes. A distinct interpretation was provided by critic Luminița Marcu, who reacted against the tradition of viewing Creangă's actual childhood as inseparable from his own subjective rendition.

Several of the book's episodes have drawn attention for the insight they offer into the culture, structure and conflicts of traditional society before 1900. Commenting on this characteristic, Djuvara asserted: "even if we take into account that the grown-up will embellish, transfigure, 'enrich' the memories of his childhood, how could we not recognize the sincerity in Creangă's heart-warming evocation of his childhood's village?" The book stays true to life in depicting ancient customs: discussing the impact of paganism on traditional Romanian customs, Marcu Beza communicated a detail of Creangă's account, which shows how January 1 celebrations of Saint Basil opposed the loud buhai players reenacting a fertility rite to people preferring a quieter celebration. The work also offers details on the traditional roles of a rural society such as that of Humulești, in the context of social change. Muguraș Constantinescu highlights the important roles of old men and women within Nică's universe, and especially that of his grandfather and "clan leader" David Creangă. The latter, she notes, is an "enlightened man" displaying "the wisdom and balance of the ripe age", a person able to insist on the importance of education, and a churchgoer who frowns on "his wife's bigotry." The seniors' regulatory role within the village is evidenced throughout the book, notoriously so in the episode where the boy captures a hoopoe who bothers his morning sleep, only to be tricked into releasing it by old man, who understands the bird's vital role as village alarm clock.

Another significant part of the account, detailing Creangă's education, shows him frustrated by the old methods of teaching, insisting on the absurd image of children learning by heart and chanting elements of Romanian grammar and even whole texts. The narrator refers to this method as "a terrible way to stultify the mind". The negative portrayal of teaching priests was commented by writer and critic Horia Gârbea as proof of the author's anticlericalism, in line with various satirical works targeting the Romanian clergy: "Creangă's Memories of the catechism school would discourage any candidate."

=== Didactic writings ===
Creangă's contribution to literature also covers a series of didactic fables written as lively dialogues, among them "The Needle and the Sledge Hammer", in which the objects of traditional metalworking scold the byproducts of their work for having forgotten their lowly origin. The inspiration behind this theme was identified by Călinescu as "The Story of a Gold Coin", written earlier by Creangă's Junimist colleague Vasile Alecsandri. A similar piece, "The Flax and the Shirt", reveals the circuit of fibers from weed-like plants into recycled cloth, leading to the conclusion that "all things are not what they seem; they were something else once, they are something else now;—and shall become something else." The technique employed by Creangă has the flax plant teaching the less knowledgeable textile, a dialogue which Călinescu likened to that between old women in a traditional society. Included alongside the two stories were: Pâcală, a writing which, Mircea Braga argued, is not as much didactic as it is a study in dialogue; "The Bear Tricked by the Fox", which uses legendary and humorous elements in an attempt to explain why bears are the tail-less species among mammals; and Cinci pâini ("Five Loafs of Bread"), which serves as a condemnation of greed.

With "Human Stupidity", Creangă builds a fable about incompetence in its absolute forms. The story centers on a peasant's quest to find people who are less rational than his wife, having been infuriated by her panic at the remote possibility that a ball of salt could fall from its place of storage and kill their baby. This, essayist and chronicler Simona Vasilache argues, highlights "a family-based division" of illogical behavior, in which women are depicted as the main propagators of both "astonishing nonsense" and "prudent stupidity". Instead, literary critic Ion Pecie identified inside the narrative a meditation on "the link between spirit and nature", with the unpredictable ball of salt representing the equivalent of a "sphinx". His colleague Gheorghe Grigurcu argued that such conclusions "may seem excessive", but that they were ultimately validated by the literary work being "a plurality of levels". A similar piece is the prose fable "The Story of a Lazy Man": fed up with the protagonist's proverbial indolence, which has led him as far as to view chewing food as an effort, his fellow villagers organize a lynching. This upsets the sensibility of a noblewoman who happens to witness the incident. When she offers to take the lazy man into her care and feed him bread crumbs, he seals his own fate by asking: "But are your bread crumbs soft?" The peculiar effect of this moral is underlined by Anghelescu: "The lazy man dies as a martyr of his own immobility." Braga interpreted the story as evidence of "the primacy of ethics" over social aspects in the local tradition. Ion Pecie saw in the story proof of Creangă's own support for capital punishment with a preventive or didactic purpose, even in cases where the fault was trivial or imagined, concluding: "Here, ... Creangă loses much of his depth." Pecie's conclusion was treated with reserve by Grigurcu, who believed that, instead, the narrator refrains from passing any judgment on "the community's instinctual eugenic reaction".

Partly didactic in scope, several of Creangă's anecdotes involve Ion Roată, a representative to the ad hoc Divan which voted in favor of Moldo-Wallachian union, and the newly elected Domnitor Alexandru Ioan Cuza. The texts convey a sense of tension between the traditional boyar aristocracy and the peasant category, closely reflecting, according to historian Philip Longworth, a conflict mounting during the second half of the 19th century. The same is argued by Ornea, who also proposes that the protagonist offers insight into Creangă's own conservative reflexes and his complex views on the union, while outlining several connections which the brand of social criticism professed by Junimea. Although Roată, a real-life person, was a representative of the pro-union National Party, his main interest, according to the stories themselves, was in curbing the boyars' infringement of peasant rights. The stories' narrator directs his hostility not at boyars in general, but at the younger Romantic nationalist ones, whom he portrays as gambling on Moldavia's future: "[There was] a clash of ideas opposing old boyars to the youth of Moldavia's ad hoc Divan, even though both were in favor of 'Union'. It's only that the old ones wanted a negotiated 'Union', and the young ones a 'Union' done without proper thinking, as it came to pass." According to Muguraș Constantinescu: "[Roată] opposes the intelligence of common folk, their common sense, their humor and the pleasure of allegorical discourse to the pompous and hollow speeches of some politicians". In this context, Cuza's presence is depicted as both legitimate and serendipitous, as he takes a personal interest in curbing boyar abuse.

=== Moș Nichifor Coțcariul and "corrosives" ===
Seen by Romanian critic Radu Voinescu as an extended anecdote, the novella Moș Nichifor Coțcariul ("Old Man Nichifor Slyboots") establishes a connection with the language of fairy tales, being located in a legendary and non-historical age. It details the elaborate seduction of a young Jewish bride by a worldly Moldavian wagoner, on the route between Târgu Neamț and Piatra. The episode, which the text itself indicates is just one in a series of Nichifor's conquests among his female clients, highlights the seducer's verbose monologue, which covers accounts of his unhappy marriage, allusions about the naturalness of physical love, and intimidating suggestions that wolves may be tempted to attack the wagon (prompting the young woman to seek refuge in his arms). The seducer's behavior, Constantinescu notes, presents an alternative to the theme of old age as a time of immobility: "the still-green old man, the rake, the joker who enjoys his amorous escapades, while justifying them by the natural course of life". Nichifor mostly expresses himself with the help of folk sayings, which he casually mixes in with personal observations about the situation. The background to the plot is a record of various superstitions, some anticlerical or antisemitic: Nichifor voices the belief that priests crossing one's path will produce bad luck, as well as the claim that Jewish apothecaries sold "poisons".

The reception of Moș Nichifor Coțcariul by Junimea illustrated its ambivalence toward Creangă. Maiorescu found the text "interesting in its way and decisively Romanian", but asked Convorbiri Literare journal to either modify it or refrain from publishing it altogether. This was complemented by its author's own self-effacing assessment: calling the text "a childish thing", he suggested to Maiorescu that revisions were needed, stating "I have written it long, because there was no time for me to write it short." Contrarily, the writer's posterity referred to it as one of the greatest Romanian contributions to the genre: according to George Călinescu, the insight into Nichifor's musings resulted in transforming the writing as a whole into "the first great Romanian novella with a stereotypical hero", while Voinescu described the entire story as "a true masterpiece."

The narrative approaches of Moș Nichifor Coțcariul bordered on Creangă's contributions to erotic literature, pieces collectively known as "corrosives" and which have for long treated with discretion by literary historians. In Călinescu's view, this chapter in Creangă's literature created another link between the Moldavian writer and the Renaissance tradition of Rabelais: "All Rabelaisians have penetrated deeply into the realm of vulgarity." The taste for titillating accounts was also cultivated by Junimea members, who discreetly signaled their wish to hear more explicit content by asking Creangă to recount stories from "the wide street". A product of this context, Moș Nichifor Coțcariul itself is said to have had at least one sexually explicit variant, circulated orally.

Two stories with explicit pornographic content survive as samples of Creangă's erotic authorship: "The Tale of Ionică the Fool" and "The Tale of All Tales" (also known as Povestea pulei, "Tale of the Dick" or "Tale of the Cock"). The former shows its cunning hero having intercourse with a priest's daughter, moving between prose and verse to describe the act. "The Tale of All Tales", which makes ample use of vulgar speech, recounts how a peasant disrespectful of divinity has his entire maize harvest transformed into male genitalia, but is able to turn out a profit by catering to the sexual appetites of women. The final section, seen by Gârbea as a sample of anticlerical jeers recorded by "the defrocked Creangă", depicts the rape of a priest by one such sexual object. Although explicit, literary historian Alex. Ștefănescu argued, the text "is refined and full of charm". While acknowledging both "corrosives" for their "popular charm" in the line of Rabelais and Geoffrey Chaucer, and noting that they still display the author's place as a "great stylist", Voinescu also signaled the texts' "very obvious" debt to folkloric sources. In his definition, Ion Creangă is "possibly the only writer" to draw on the legacy of "luscious popular jests" found in local "erotic folklore". Nevertheless, according to literary critic Mircea Iorgulescu, "The Tale of All Tales" may in fact be based on Parapilla, a pornographic leaflet circulating in Italian and French.

== Legacy ==
=== Estate, family and early cultural impact ===
Soon after the Creangă's death, efforts began to collect his manuscript writings and the updated versions of his printed works. This project involved his son Constantin, alongside A. D. Xenopol, Grigore Alexandrescu and Eduard Gruber, the latter of whom obtained the works from Tinca Vartic. The first edition was published as two volumes, in 1890–1892, but the project came to an abrupt halt due to Gruber's insanity and death. Creangă's final known work, the fragment of Făt-frumos, fiul iepei, was published by Convorbiri Literare in 1898. The Gruber copies were sold to a Dr. Mendel, and only a part of them was recovered by exegetes, alongside various fragments accidentally discovered at Iași market, where they were being used for wrapping paper. The collection, structured into a whole by folklorist Gheorghe T. Kirileanu, was published by Editura Minerva in 1902 and 1906. In addition to being mentioned in the memoirs of several prominent Junimists, Creangă had his political career fictionalized and satirized by Iacob Negruzzi, who transformed him, as Popa Smântână, into a character of his satirical poems Electorale ("Electorals"). The same author referred to his counterpart in one of his epigrams.

Shortly after her lover's death, Tinca Vartic married a man who lived in the same part of Iași. The target of organized tourism from as early as 1890, the Iași Bojdeuca nevertheless fell into disrepair. It was eventually purchased by an "Ion Creangă Committee", whose members included Constantin Creangă, Kirileanu and the ultra-nationalist politician A. C. Cuza. It was set up as the first of Romania's "memorial houses" on April 15, 1918. Restored the same year and again in 1933–1934, it houses an important part of Creangă's personal items and the first known among Creangă's portraits, painted by his contemporary V. Mușnețanu. While Constantin Creangă had a successful career in the Romanian Army, one of the writer's two grandsons, Horia Creangă, became one of the celebrated modern architects of the interwar period, earning his reputation by redesigning much of downtown Bucharest.

The popularity of Ion Creangă's accounts outside his regional and dialectal context, together with his own contribution as an educator, played a part in the evolution of standard Romanian, at a new phase in which many dialectal variations were incorporated into the spoken language. His primers Metodă nouă ... and Învățătoriul copiilor went through many editions during the late 19th century. The impact of his works was also a contributing factor to preserving a noted interest in rural subjects, a subsequent defining trait in modern Romanian literature. Discussing "stylistic harmony", which he believed to be bridging all of Romania's social and literary environments, philosopher Mircea Eliade wrote: "Romanians consider Ion Creangă a classic writer belonging to the modern age. His work can be read and understood by the entire range of social classes, in all the provinces of our country. In spite of the abundant presence of Moldavian words in his writings, the work would not remain a stranger to its readers. What other European culture can take pride in having a classic writer read by all categories of readers?" The "thematic grip of the village" was noted by American academic Harold Segel, who investigated its impact on "some of the most revered names in the history of Romanian literature", from Creangă and Slavici to interwar novelist Liviu Rebreanu.

=== Early 20th century and interwar echoes ===
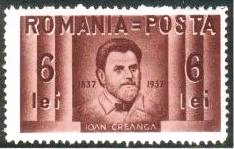
Ion Creangă, as depicted on a 1937 Romanian stamp

A more thorough evaluation of Creangă's literature began after 1900. At the time, it became a topic of interest to the emerging traditionalist and populist trend, illustrated by the two venues rivaling Junimea: the right-wing Sămănătorul, led by Nicolae Iorga, and the left-wing Poporanists, among which was Garabet Ibrăileanu. The new editions of his works enlisted the collaboration of Sămănătorist intellectuals Ilarie Chendi and Ștefan Octavian Iosif. Tudor Vianu however noted that, unlike Eminescu's outlook, Creangă's "authentic ruralism" did not complement the "spiritual complications", global social class perspective and intellectual background associated with these trends, making Creangă "the least Sămănătorist among our writers." According to Ornea, Creangă has "nothing in common" with the Sămănătorul ideology in particular: while the group shared his nostalgic outlook on the rural past in stark contrast to the modernized world, the Moldavian author could "maintain, intelligently, the middle ground between contraries". Likewise, Mircea Braga reacted against the perception of Creangă as announcing a "series" of authors, noting that, for all imitation, he was "an exceptional and, as far as Romanian literary history goes, unique creator."

Directly influenced by Creangă, several early 20th century and interwar authors within the new traditionalist trend explicitly stood for the legacy of folkloric, spontaneous and unskilled literature: the peasant writer I. Dragoslav, whose memoirs borrow stylistic elements from Creangă's accounts; Constantin Sandu-Aldea, an agriculturalist by profession, who took inspiration from his techniques of rendering dialogue; and Ion Iovescu, whom the Sburătorul literary circle acclaimed as "a new Creangă", and who made ample use of a modernized Muntenian dialect. Similarly, the Aromanian activist and author Nicolae Constantin Batzaria, who divided his career between Romania and the southern Balkans, combined Creangă's storytelling techniques with the traditions of Turkish literature, while the reworking of regional folklore themes earned intellectual Constantin S. Nicolăescu-Plopșor a reputation as "the Oltenian Creangă". During the 1910s, folklorist Tudor Pamfile published a specialized magazine named Ion Creangă in honor of the writer. Creangă's various works also provided starting points for several other writers of diverse backgrounds. They included representatives of the Symbolist movement, such as Victor Eftimiu, who was inspired by Creangă's narrative style in writing his fantasy and verse play Înșir'te mărgărite. Another such author was poet Elena Farago, whose didactic children's story Într-un cuib de rândunică ("Inside a Swallow's Nest") borrows from "The Flax and the Shirt".

With the interwar period and the spread of modernist literature, a new generation of critics, most notably George Călinescu and Vladimir Streinu, dedicated important segments of their activity to the works of Ion Creangă. Other such figures were Șerban Cioculescu, whose contribution attempts to elucidate the more mysterious parts of the writer's vocabulary, and educator Dumitru Furtună, whose biographical studies provided a main source for subsequent research. By then, interest in Creangă's life and writings had diversified. This phenomenon first touched Romanian theater when I. I. Mironescu dramatized a section of Creangă's Memories as Catiheții de la Humulești ("The Catechists from Humulești")—a literary contribution judged "superfluous" by George Călinescu, who noted that the original was already "dramatic" in style. The writer's stories also became an inspiration for Alfred Mendelsohn and Alexandru Zirra, two Romanian composers who worked in children's musical theater, who adapted, respectively, "Harap Alb" and "The Goat and Her Three Kids". Creangă was also a secondary presence in Mite and Bălăuca, two biographical novels centered on Eminescu's amorous life, written by the prominent interwar critic Eugen Lovinescu, to whom Călinescu reproached having largely ignored Creangă in his nonfictional texts. Creangă's writings also earned followers among the more radical wing of the modernist scene. The authenticity and originality of Creangă's prose were highlighted and treasured by the influential modernist venue Contimporanul, in particular by its literary chroniclers Ion Vinea and Benjamin Fondane. Likewise, while formally affiliating with Surrealism, the avant-garde author Ion Călugăru contributed various prose works which borrow some of Creangă's storytelling techniques to depict the lives of Jewish Romanian communities from Moldavia.

In stages after World War I, the 19th century writer became better known to an international audience. This process produced translations into English, some of which, Călinescu argued, reached significant popularity among British readers of Romanian literature. In contrast, writer Paul Bailey assessed that the variants used antiquated words and "sounded terrible" in English. Among the series of early English-language versions was a 1920 edition of Creangă's Memories, translated by Lucy Byng and published by Marcu Beza. It was also during the interwar that Jean Boutière published the first-ever French-language monograph on the Romanian writer, originally as a PhD thesis for the University of Paris.

While their author continued to receive praise for his main contributions, the erotic tales were most often kept hidden from the public eye. George Călinescu summarized this contrast by stating: "The 'corrosives' left by Creangă are not known publicly." An exception to this rule was Kirileanu's Creangă reader of 1938, published by Editura Fundațiilor Regale as the first critical edition of his entire literature. According to critic Adrian Solomon, the Romanian tradition of silencing obscene language and sexually explicit literature through censorship made "The Tale of All Tales" circulate "rather like a samizdat", which left writers with "no solid tradition to draw on, and precious little chance to evade ... the vigilant morals of a straitlaced public." The nationalist aspects of Ion Creangă's public discourse were however approved of and recovered by the far right of the 1920s and '30s. High-ranking Orthodox cleric Tit Simedrea referred to Creangă as a predecessor when, in 1937, he urged his congregation to refrain from purchasing merchandise sold by Jews (a measure which he believed was a practical alternative to the Jews' forced eviction). In 1939, as part of a press campaign targeting Călinescu's work, the fascist journal Porunca Vremii accused the literary historian of having exposed Creangă's biography for the sake of compromising the "genial Moldavian" by turning him into "an unfrocked epileptic and a drunk."

Creangă inspired a 1920 painting by Octav Băncilă, which shows Creangă listening to Eminescu reading his poems. Two busts of the author were erected in Iași, respectively at his grave site and, in 1932, the gardens of Copou neighborhood. After 1943, another such piece was unveiled in Bucharest's Cișmigiu Gardens, as part of Rotunda Scriitorilor monument.

=== Under communism ===
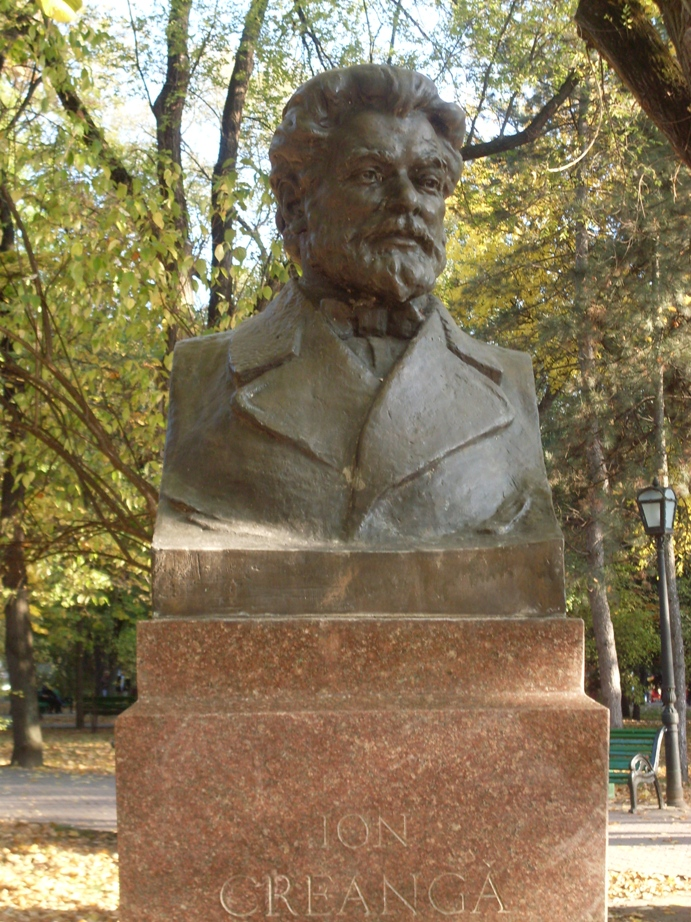
Lev Averbruh's bust of Ion Creangă (Alley of Classics, Chișinău)

During Romania's restrictive communist period, which lasted between 1948 and 1989, the critical evaluation of Ion Creangă's work went through several periods, complementing political developments. Throughout the first part of this interval, when socialist realism was politically imposed on Romanian letters, Creangă was spared the posthumous censorship which affected several other classical writers (see Censorship in Communist Romania). His work was officially praised for its aesthetic qualities, but its association with the condemned Junimea was omitted from critical commentary, and readers were instead referred to Creangă as a realist critical of bourgeois society. In 1948, the new authorities granted him posthumous membership in the Romanian Academy. The following year, at the height of Soviet occupation, official critic Barbu Lăzăreanu controversially described Creangă as a writer indebted to Russian folklore.

By the second half of communist rule, several new approaches in the critical assessment of Creangă's literature were emerging. His work became a main topic of critical interest and the sole subject of many works, to the point where Nicolae Manolescu assessed that "everything has been said about Creangă". Within this exegetic phenomenon, an original interpretation of his stories from an esoteric perspective was written by philosopher Vasile Lovinescu as Creangă și Creanga de aur ("Creangă and the Golden Bough"). During the final two decades of communism, under Nicolae Ceaușescu, the recovery of nationalist discourse into official dogma also encouraged the birth of protochronism. In one of its aspects, theorized by cultural historian Edgar Papu, this approach controversially reevaluated various Romanian writers, Creangă included, presenting them as figures who anticipated most developments on the world stage. Papu's own conclusion about "Harap Alb", outlined in a 1983 volume, depicted Creangă as a direct predecessor of Italian semiotician Umberto Eco and his celebrated volume The Open Work—a conclusion which literary historian Florin Mihăilescu has seen as proof of Papu's "exegetic obsession", lacking in "sense of humor, not just sense of reality." One of Papu's disciples, national communist ideologue Dan Zamfirescu, claimed that Creangă was equal to, or even more important than world classics Homer, William Shakespeare and Johann Wolfgang von Goethe, while asserting that the eponymous protagonist of "Ivan Turbincă" stands as "the character who dominates world history in our century". Left outside the scope of this critical interest, the "corrosives" were left out of new Creangă readers (such as Iorgu Iordan's 1970 edition), being, according to a 1976 essay by scholar George Munteanu, "still unpublishable" for lack of "a general level of aesthetic education" among Romanians.

A second museum entirely dedicated to the writer was opened at his Târgu Neamț home in 1951, and donated to the state by his successors in 1965. During the following decades, it reportedly became the most visited memorial house in Romania. The authorities also financed a new cultural center, raised in the immediate vicinity of Bojdeuca during 1984–1989. In 1965, the Ion Creangă Children's Theater, a state-run institution, was founded in Bucharest, and its subsequent activity included staging several of the writer's fairy tales for a junior public. Among such contributions were two adaptation of "Harap Alb", directed respectively by Ion Lucian and Zoe Anghel Stanca. In 1983, Timișoara-based author Șerban Foarță also completed work on a stage version of "Ivan Turbincă".

A new publishing house, Editura Ion Creangă, was created as a main publisher of children's literature, and its output included editions of Creangă's own works. The new editions were illustrated by several visual artists of note, among them Corneliu Baba, Eugen Taru and Lívia Rusz, while "Harap Alb" became a project of comic book artist Sandu Florea, earning him a Eurocon prize. A major project of the time involved Creangă translations into other languages, including Hungarian (a celebrated contribution by Hungarian-Romanian author András Sütő). During the same epoch, Creangă and his stories first became sources of inspiration for the Romanian film industry. Among the first were two contributions of filmmaker Elisabeta Bostan, both released in the early 1960s and based on the Memories: Amintiri din copilărie (starring child actor Ion Bocancea as the young Nică and Ștefan Ciubotărașu as the grown-up narrator), and Pupăza din tei (focusing on the hoopoe story). In 1965, celebrated Romanian director Ion Popescu-Gopo released De-aș fi Harap Alb, a loose adaptation of "Harap Alb", starring Florin Piersic in the title role. Popescu-Gopo also directed the 1976 film Povestea dragostei, which was based on "The Story of the Pig" and the 1985 film "Ramasagul" which was based on "The Bag with 2 Coins". The series also includes Nicolae Mărgineanu's biographical film of 1989, Un bulgăre de humă, focuses on the friendship between Creangă (played by Dorel Vișan) and Eminescu (Adrian Pintea).

The legacy of Ion Creangă was also tangible in the Soviet Union, and especially in the Moldavian SSR (which, as the larger section of Bessarabia, had been part of interwar Greater Romania, and later became independent Moldova). Initially, his writings, titled Moldavian Stories, formed part of the Soviet curriculum in the Moldavian Autonomous Region (Transnistria). Following the Soviet occupation of Bessarabia, Creangă was one of the Romanian-language writers whose works were still allowed for publishing by the new authorities. This provided local contributors to Romanian literature contact with older cultural models, directly inspiring the experimental or Postmodern prose pieces by Vlad Ioviță and Leo Butnaru. The endorsement of Creangă's public image within the Moldavian SSR was also reflected in art: in 1958, the writer's bust, the work of sculptor Lev Averbruh, was assigned to the Alley of Classics in Chișinău. His works were illustrated by one of the Moldavian SSR's leading visual artists, Igor Vieru, who also painted a portrait of the author. In 1967, Ioviță and filmmaker Gheorghe Vodă released Se caută un paznic: an adaptation of "Ivan Turbincă" and one of the successful samples of early Moldovan cinema, it was also noted for the musical score, composed by Eugen Doga. Also during that period, "The Goat ..." and "The Purse a' Tuppence" were made into animated shorts (directed by Anton Mater and Constantin Condrea). In 1978, an operatic version of "The Goat and Her Three Kids" was created by composer Zlata Tkach, based on a libretto by Grigore Vieru.

=== After 1989 ===
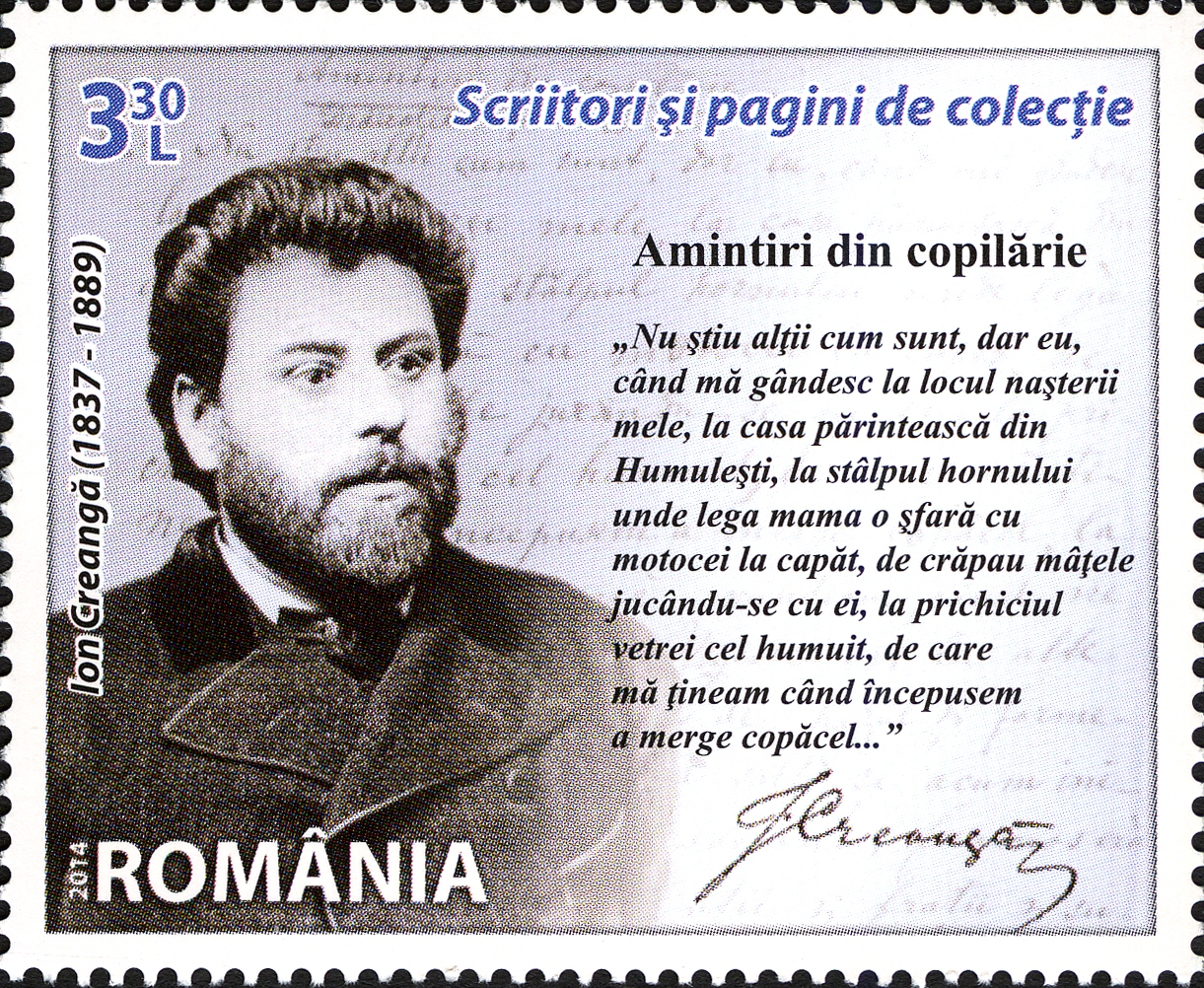
Creangă on a 2014 Romanian stamp

The 1989 Revolution, which signaled the end of communism, closely preceded the dissolution of the Soviet Union. Renewed Moldova–Romania relations, and moves toward potential reunification, were consecrated by 1990 events such as the "Bridge of Flowers". The latter tour saw Moldovan politicians and cultural delegates demanding, and obtaining, that they be allowed to visit Bojdeuca. In 1993, answering a petition signed by a group of cultural personalities from Iași, Metropolitan Daniel (the future Patriarch of All Romania) signed a decision to posthumously revert the decision to exclude Ion Creangă from among the Moldavian clergy. The public polled during a 2006 program produced by the Romanian Television nominated Creangă 43rd among the 100 greatest Romanians. New monuments honoring the writer include a bust unveiled in Târgu Neamț, the work of sculptor Ovidiu Ciobotaru. The patrimony associated with Creangă's life has also sparked debates: local authorities in Târgu Neamț were criticized for not maintaining the site near his house in its best condition, while the house in Fălticeni where he once lived was controversially put up for sale by its private owners in 2009, at a time when city hall could not exercise its pre-emption right.

Creangă's work was also subject to rediscovery and reevaluation. This implied the publishing of his "corrosives", most notably in a 1998 edition titled Povestea poveștilor generației '80 ("The Tale of the Tales of the 80s Generation"). Edited by Dan Petrescu and Luca Pițu, it featured a Postmodern reworking of Povestea poveștilor by Mircea Nedelciu, a leading theorist of the Optzeciști writers. A trilingual edition of Creangă's original text was published in 2006 as a Humanitas project, with illustrations made for the occasion by graphic artist Ioan Iacob. The book included versions of the text in English (the work of Alistair Ian Blyth) and French (translated by Marie-France Ionesco, the daughter of playwright Eugène Ionesco), both of which were noted for resorting exclusively to antiquated slang. In 2004, another one of Creangă's stories was subjected to a Postmodern interpretation, with Stelian Țurlea's novel Relatare despre Harap Alb ("A Report about Harap Alb"). In 2009, Țurlea followed up with a version of "The Old Man's Daughter and the Old Woman's Daughter"; a year later, his colleague Horia Gârbea published a personal take on "The Story of a Lazy Man". Ion Creangă's own didactic tales have remained a presence in the Romanian curriculum after 2000, particularly in areas of education targeting the youngest students.

New films based on Creangă's writings include, among others, Mircea Daneliuc's Tusea și junghiul of 1992 (an adaptation of "The Old Man's Daughter ...") and Tudor Tătaru's Moldovan-Romanian co-production Dănilă Prepeleac (1996). There were also several post-1989 theatrical adaptations of Ion Creangă's texts, contributed by various Romanian dramaturges. Some of these are Cornel Todea's variant of "Harap Alb" (with music by Nicu Alifantis), Cristian Pepino's take on "The Goat and Her Three Kids", Mihai Mălaimare's Prostia omenească (from "Human Stupidity") and Gheorghe Hibovski's Povestea poveștilor, a fringe theater show using both Creangă's original and Nedelciu's text.

Creangă's name was assigned to several education institutions, among them Bucharest's Ion Creangă National College, and to an annual prize granted by the Romanian Academy. There is an Ion Creangă commune, in Neamț County, and streets or squares were also named in the writer's honor in cities throughout Romania: Târgu Neamț, Iași, Fălticeni, Bucharest, Arad, Brăila, Brașov, Cluj-Napoca, Craiova, Drobeta-Turnu Severin, Oradea, Ploiești, Sibiu, Suceava, Târgu Mureș, Tecuci, Timișoara, Tulcea, etc. A quarter in northern Bucharest, near Colentina, is also named Ion Creangă. Creangă's name was assigned to several landmarks and institutions in post-Soviet Moldova. Among them is the Ion Creangă Pedagogical State University, founded on the basis of Chișinău's normal school.

== Relevant literature ==
- Corina, Iordan. Linguistic and Cultural Characteristics of Creangă's Speech. Scientific Collection «INTERCONF» Proceedings of the 1st International and Practical Conference „Science, Education, Innovation: Topical Issues and Modern Aspects”, Tallinn, Estonia: Uhingu Teadus juhatus No. 2(38). pp. 520–525. online
