= Dănilă Prepeleac =

- Author: Ion Creangă
- Language: Romanian
- Publication date: 1876

"Dănilă Prepeleac" (Romanian pronunciation: [dəˈnilə prepeˈle̯ak]; occasionally translated as "Danilo the Pole", "Dănilă Haystack-Peg" or "Danillo Nonsuch") is an 1876 fantasy short story and fairy tale by Romanian author Ion Creangă, with a theme echoing influences from local folklore. The narrative is structured around two accounts. In the first part, the eponymous peasant hero, shown to be poor, lazy and idiotic, exposes his incompetence and lack of foresight by becoming involved in a cycle of barters, which results in him exchanging a pair of oxen for an empty bag. The second portion of the text shows Dănilă's adventures inside a forest, where he decides to become a hermit, unwitting that the land is inhabited by an army of devils. Confronted by the latter, he survives a set of challenges by outsmarting his adversaries, and, although losing one eye to demonic curses, he becomes the recipient of a large fortune awarded by Satan himself.

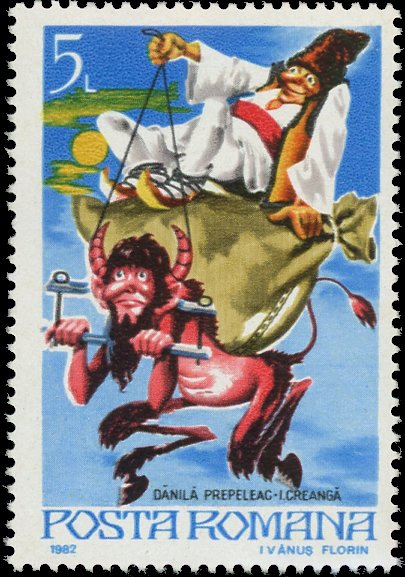
Romanian stamp depicting Dănilă Prepeleac

Noted among samples of 19th century Romanian humor, "Dănilă Prepeleac" earned critical attention for its creative language, the defining traits of its main characters, and echoes of larger themes found throughout European folklore. It also inspired works in other media, such as a 1996 film by Moldovan director Tudor Tătaru.

== Name ==
Prepeleac itself is a Romanian-language word of unattested origin, designating slim wooden poles or pegs. These are used in rural society either for stacking hay (according to a traditional method in which the pole rises above and in the middle of the rounded pile) or for drying out freshly made pottery; see also ro:Prepeleac. "Prepeleac" is also used in the Romanian proverb "A fi gol prepeleac" - "naked as a pot pole" in reference to a poor person.

The story carries the name of its main character. The word Dănilă originates with either a hypocorism (the personal name Dan, which changes form after being added the diminutive suffix -ilă) or an antiquated version of the name Daniel (akin to Danilo).

== Plot summary ==
=== Dănilă's misfortunes ===
The plot of "Dănilă Prepeleac" centers on its eponymous hero, the younger of two brothers. Unlike his sibling, depicted as a well-to-do peasant (chiabur) and a hardworking man, the destitute Dănilă is also "lazy" and "lackadaisical", resorting to borrowing from his relatives whatever he lacks around the house. The two are each married, and, while Dănilă's wife has all the qualities he lacks, the older brother's is a "shrew". Heeding the advice of his mean wife and upset at always having to provide for Dănilă, the older brother asks him to change his ways. He suggests that Dănilă should sell his only valuable possession, an outstanding pair of oxen, and use the money to buy himself smaller working animals and a cart. The younger brother decides to do so, but on his way to the fair he falls victim to a string of unfair exchanges, partly motivated by his naïvite and indolence. When his oxen have some trouble climbing a hill, he sells them to a passer-by in exchange for a new cart, which he then proceeds to drag on his way to the fair. He then finds himself facing another slope, and frustration leads him to sell the vehicle to another peasant, in exchange for a goat. This trade as well leaves him unsatisfied, as the animal keeps twitching about, and he sells it for a goose. The bird's loud honks annoy him, and, once he has reached the fair, Dănilă exchanges it for an empty bag. After analyzing the chain of events which has led him to transact two oxen for a useless item, he grows despondent and concludes that "the devil [was] o' top o' me all this bargaining day".

Scolded by his brother upon returning home, Prepeleac persuades him to lend him a cart for a final time, and uses it to collect firewood. Once in the forest, he carelessly proceeds to chop of a fully grown tree, which cracks the vehicle and kills the oxen upon falling down. While contemplating the thought of not informing his brother of the loss (and instead deciding to steal his mare and ride his family out into the open world), the protagonist loses his way out of the woods. He arrives on the shore of a pond, where he attempts to hunt coots by throwing his axe at them, with the only result of this being that the tool falls to the bottom. After making his way home, he abides by his earlier plan, telling his brother that the oxen are stuck in thick mud, and that he needs the mare to get them out. His sibling angrily refuses, telling Dănilă that he is unfit for "the worldly life" and urging him to withdraw as an Orthodox hermit. Dănilă instead steals his brother's mare and sets back for the pond, where he aims to start searching for his axe.

=== Dănilă and the devils ===
Back in the forest, Dănilă comes to see truth in his brother's advice, and decides to build his own monastery on the spot. While selecting trees to chop down, he runs into a devil "who'd come up fresh from the pond's waters." After engaging the man in conversation, the creature is terrified by his prospects, but fails to convince him that Hell owns both the pond and the forest surrounding it. He runs back to Satan (referred to under the Romanian alternative Scaraoschi), who decides to let Dănilă have a barrel-full of coins in exchange for leaving the place. While the recipient of this gift ponders about how to take the barrel home, Satan's envoy challenges him to a contest of powers. The junior devil proves his own by circling the pond with the mare on his back. Dănilă then tricks him by riding the horse around the same perimeter, and claiming to have been the one carrying it with the inside of his thighs. Prepeleac refuses to take part in the devil's next challenge, which involves a sprint, claiming that it is too much beneath his abilities. Instead, he invites him to race his "youngest child", in reality a rabbit resting in the forest, and then watches as the devil fails to keep up with the animal. Dănilă employs the same type of ruse when the devil asks him to wrestle, by demanding that his interlocutor first try his hand at pinning down "an uncle o' mine, 999 years and 52 weeks of age", and then leading him into a bear's cave. Ruffled up and defeated by the beast, the devil then agrees to Prepeleac's next contest, a shrieking challenge. After listening to the impressive sounds bellowed by the creature and claiming to be unimpressed, the peasant warns him that his own shriek is capable of destroying a brain, and tells him that he should only witness it while blindfolded and with his ears muffled. The devil allows Dănilă to tie a rag over his eyes and ears, after which the protagonist repeatedly hits him over the temples with an oak beam, implying that this is the unheard sound of his own shriek. The terrified creature then runs back into Hell.

The angry Satan sends out another one of his servants, who challenges Prepeleac to a mace-throwing contest. The newly arrived devil demonstrates his power by throwing the object as high up into the sky as to render it invisible to the naked eye, and it takes three full days for the mace to come back down and tunnel to the Earth's core. While his adversary retrieves the weapon, Dănilă desperately ponders a new ruse. Eventually, he tells the devil that he will aim the mace in the direction of the Moon, where his "brothers" the Moon men will catch it, being "in great need for iron to shoe their horses." The alarmed devil pleads with him not to dispose of "an heirloom from our forefather", quickly retrieving the mace and running with it back into the water. This prompts Satan to call upon his soldiers, sending the most skilled among them to do away with the peasant. He decides to confront Dănilă in a contest of curses and spells. He is first to try, and manages to pop out one of Dănilă Prepeleac's eyes (described by the narrator as just retribution for Prepeleac's wrongdoing). The wounded protagonist then tells his adversary that, in order to fulfill his part of the challenge, he must be taken back to his house, where he has left curses and spells inherited from his forefathers. The devil solves his problems by carrying him and his treasure on his back, and, upon reaching his home, Prepeleac calls on his wife and children to come out with the curses, specifying that he means a dog-collar with spikes and the iron combs used for combing. His many young boys then use pounce on the devil and start scraping his skin with the combs. The wounded and terrified creature vanishes, while Dănilă is left to enjoy his treasure "well into his old age".

== Critical reception and cultural legacy ==
The motif of the first part is Aarne-Thompson type 1415 "Trading Away One's Fortune".

According to literary historian George Bădărău, "Dănilă Prepeleac" is one of Creangă's writings where the fairy tale context meets "realistic fantasy". The plot, he notes, is similar to that of Creangă's other satirical and fantasy short stories, "Ivan Turbincă" and "Stan Pățitul", in which men who seem stupid are nevertheless able to trick devils. The story was described by the influential interwar critic and literary historian George Călinescu as one of Ion Creangă's writings with a transparent moral, in this case "that the stupid man is lucky." In its first published form, "Dănilă Prepeleac" makes use of several rare words or dialectical constructs, in contrast to the standard lexis and grammar. The "word's intonation" and the "implicit gesture", Călinescu argued, make dialogues between Dănilă and his fellow peasants work as a theatrical text, which could be acted without further intervention. Notably, Creangă's narrative includes an unusual presence of the comparative adverb mai in describing how one of the villagers trading with Dănilă behaves after their unbalanced transaction: pleacă pe costișă într-o parte spre pădure și se cam mai duce. The approximate meaning of this is: "[he] leaves sideways up the slope [and] toward the forest and disappears more rather than less". Literary chronicler Gabriela Ursachi highlights the humorous purpose of mai in this context: "Far from being a superfluous construct, [it] suggests exactly the haste with which the happy man [...] vanishes."

A main focus of critical attention has been the manner in which Creangă depicted the story's protagonist. His string of disadvantageous transactions, researcher and theater critic Mirella Nedelcu-Patureau argues, echoes a theme common in Romanian folklore and other European traditions, resonating in particular with "Hans in Luck", the Brothers Grimm story (and, through it, with Bertold Brecht's play Jean la chance). The recourse to unbalanced exchanges between the naïve and the shrewd is found in traditional accounts from both of two Romanian regions: Creangă's native Moldavia and its southern neighbor Wallachia. Ethnologist Pavel Ruxăndoiu placed "Dănilă Prepeleac", alongside a fragment of Povestea vorbii ("The Story of the Word"), a poem by the Wallachian Anton Pann, in a category of writings codifying that tradition.

The interest of critics was attracted to the protagonist's characterization and the problems of interpretation that it poses. According to ethnologist Șerban Anghelescu, Dănilă displays "idiocy serving to initiate", while Ursachi sees the hero as manifesting "complete, and therefore sublime, stupidity." Briefly reviewing earlier comments made about the work, literary historian Mircea Braga underlines the break between the two sections of the narrative, which seem to portray Prepeleac as two very different characters. He sees this as direct proof of Creangă's emancipation from the conventions of fairy tales, allowing the writer to progress within his own text and "annul the schematic-simplistic character" presumed by tradition. The characterization of Dănilă, as provided by critic Ioana Pârvulescu, contrasts his "stupidly intelligent" attributes with those of the "stupidly stupid" devil. Noting that Prepeleac is able to easily manipulate the devil with the myth of lunar creatures, Pârvulescu paraphrases a possible didactic intent on the part of the narrator: "superstition is for stupid folk, and stupidity is the devil himself, or vice versa, the devil is stupidity incarnate."

The accumulation of negative traits is counterbalanced by the attributes of other characters, including the goodness displayed by Dănilă's wife. Contrasting the sexism he identifies in several of Creangă's stories with the modern standards of political correctness, literary critic Ion Manolescu sees the manner in which Prepeleac's sister-in-law is portrayed as leading to an implicit moral: "if you want to tear a family apart, call for a woman."

"Dănilă Prepeleac" has had several adaptations for the Romanian stage, one of which has been traditionally performed at the Ion Creangă Children's Theater in Bucharest. The story also forms part of Creangă's legacy in Romania's neighbor, Moldova. Before 1991, while the region was still part of the Soviet Union as the Moldavian SSR, one of the leading Moldovan artists Igor Vieru, contributed original illustrations to local editions of the story. In 1996, filmmaker Tudor Tătaru directed a Moldovan-Romanian co-production of the tale, starring Mircea Diaconu in the title role.
