= The Goat and Her Three Kids =

1875 short story by Ion Creangă

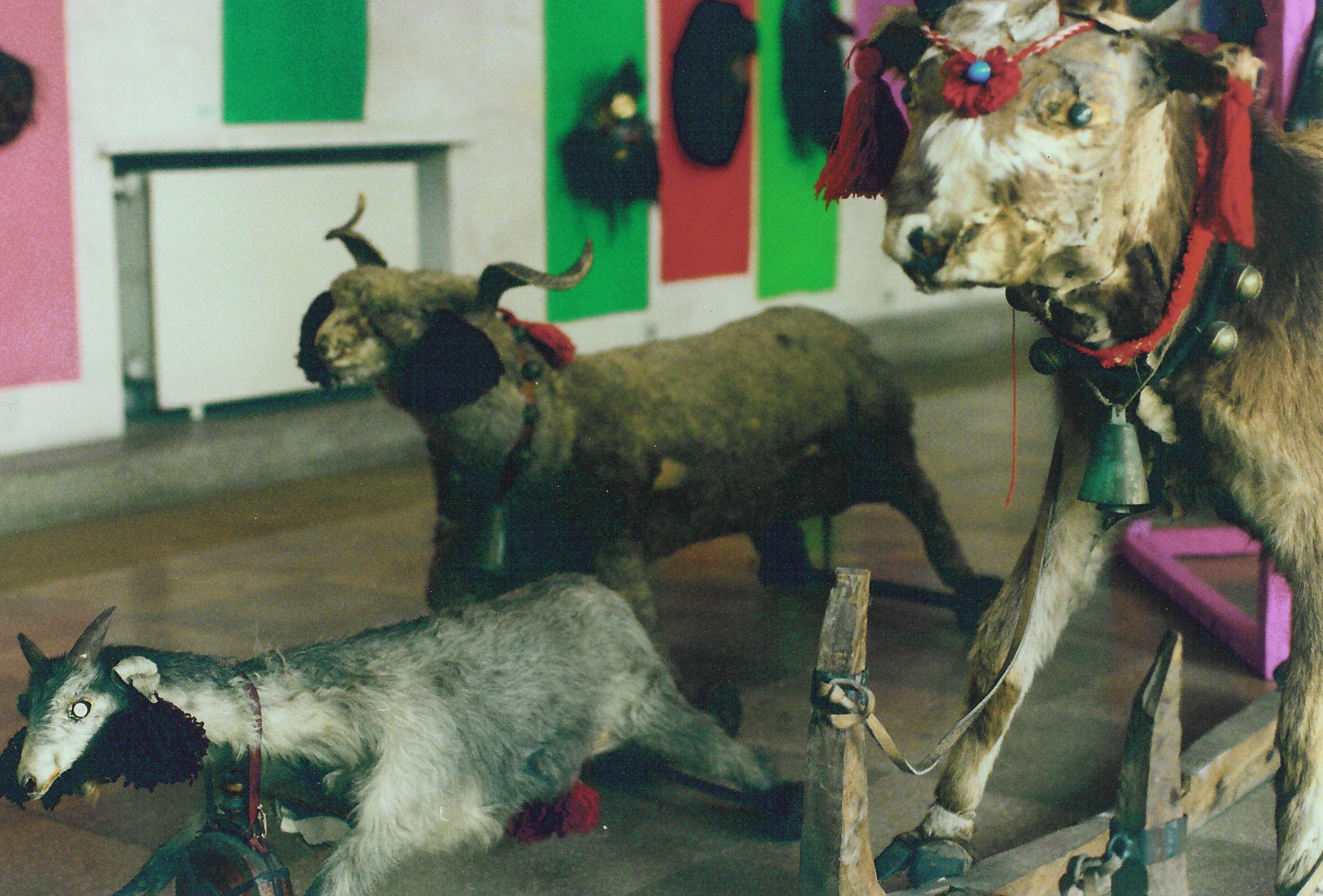
The effigies of a goat, sheep and cow, as used in some peasant festivities (Museum of the Romanian Peasant, Bucharest)

"The Goat and Her Three Kids" or "The Goat with Three Kids" (Romanian: Capra cu trei iezi) is an 1875 short story, fable and fairy tale by Romanian author Ion Creangă. Figuratively illustrating the notions of motherly love and childish disobedience, it recounts how a family of goats is ravaged by the Big Bad Wolf, allowed inside the secured home by the oldest, most ill-behaved and least prudent of the kids. The only one of the children to survive is the youngest and most obedient, who then helps his mother plan her revenge on the predator, leading to a dénouement in which the wolf is tricked, burned alive and stoned to death.

Popularized by the Romanian curriculum and included in primers, Creangă's tale has endured as one of the best-known works in local children's literature. "The Goat and Her Three Kids" has also been the topic of several music, theater and film adaptations, in both Romania and Moldova.

== Plot ==
The story opens with an introduction of its protagonists: the hardworking and widowed goat and her three kids, of whom the two older ones are misbehaved, while the youngest obeys his mother. On one day, the goat gathers all three around, telling them that she must leave on a quest for food, instructing them not to open the door unless they hear her singing, in a characteristically soft voice, the refrain:

Trei iezi cucuieți
Ușa mamei descuieți!
Că mama v-aduce vouă:
Frunze-n buze,
Lapte-n țâțe,
Drob de sare
În spinare,
Mălăieș
În călcăieș,
Smoc de flori
Pe subsuori.

Three kids with growing horns,
Open the door for your mother!
Because mother is bringing you:
Leaves on her lips,
Milk in her teats,
A ball of salt
On her back,
Cornmeal
On her heel,
A tuft of flowers
In her armpits.

The conversation is overheard by the wolf, who spies on the goat's family. Although being a godfather to the kids (and therefore an in-law, cumătru, to the goat herself), the villain has his eye set on eating the goat's children. A while after the mother has left, the wolf sneaks in front of the door and starts singing her song to the three kids. The ruse succeeds in convincing the eldest two children, who rush in to open the door. They are stopped by the youngest, who notices that the song is performed in an unusually coarse voice.

Having heard this too, the Big Bad Wolf hurries over to a smith's shop, where he gets his tongue and teeth "sharpened". He then returns to the goat's house, and this time performs the song in a soft voice. The eldest kid ignores his youngest brother's advice for more caution, and rushes in to let the stranger in. Meanwhile, the other two hide around the house: the youngest by tunneling his way up the soot-filled chimney, the second-oldest by hiding under an overturned trough. As soon as he is in, the wolf decapitates the careless kid and eats him whole. This prompts the polite but imprudent kid hiding under the trough to speak up and wish him să-ți fie de bine (roughly, "may it serve you"). As a result of this, the intruder is able to drag him out of his hiding place and gulp him down. After spending some time looking for the third kid, the wolf tires and, in what is intended as a humiliating gesture, stains the walls with the kids' blood and places their heads on the window sills, modifying their facial expression to seem like they are smiling.

The wolf eventually leaves, and the youngest kid emerges from the chimney unharmed. Initially deceived by the heads smiling at her as she enters the courtyard, the goat learns what happened from the youngest kid, and begins to plot her revenge. She soon afterward begins cooking a rich meal, and filling a large pit near her house with embers and slow-burning firewood. She covers the spot with thin layers of mats and earth, and places a stool made out of wax on top of these. The goat then walks into the forest and meets her cumătru, informing him that she has discovered his evil deed, but that she has moved on. She also asks the wolf to attend a traditional memorial service for the kids, back at her house. The villain agrees, and unwittingly takes his seat on the wax chair, which melts as he consumes meal after meal. Eventually, he falls into the pit and is engulfed by the flames. As he slowly burns and pleads for rescue, the goat informs him that she follows "the words of the scripture", or lex talionis, which she paraphrases as "a death for a death [and] a burn for a burn". The story ends as the mother and child finish off their enemy with stoning, and all goats in the area celebrate the death with an actual feast.

== Critical reception and cultural legacy ==
An early critical interpretation of "The Goat and Her Three Kids" was provided by George Călinescu, the influential interwar literary critic and historian. Having identified the narrative's tentative moral as an "illustration of motherly love", he saw Creangă's story as moving beyond this limited goal, through both style and intent. In his view, the work became "a drama of maternity" and a fable using characteristic anthropomorphism ("the devices of La Fontaine"). In this context, he noted, the tale also provided a comedic "analogy between the animal and the human worlds", with "symbols-caricatures": the goat "with many udders and a bleating voice" as "a caricature of motherhood which nature itself has provided", but also as "the garrulous and whiny woman"; the wolf as a "man without scruples." Literary historian Mircea Braga explored the narrative in order to locate themes he argues are characteristic for both Creangă's work and Romanian folklore: the "perturbing situation" (in this case, the departure of the goat and the unusual responsibility bestowed on her sons), the rite of passage trial (testing the kids' ability to hide from the path of danger) and the happy ending as a triumph of the good, which often involves a positive reply to each of the evil deeds preceding it (the mock-feast organized by goat).

Ethnologist Şerban Anghelescu interpreted the entire story through its food- and fire-related symbolism. In his assessment, the opposition is between goat and wolf is that between a "feeder par excellence", whose producing abilities are indicated by the password she selects, and an intruding "avid consumer", who celebrates his status by performing an "enigmatic ritual" with the kids' severed heads. The plot, Anghelescu notes, inverts these two main roles, transforming the goat into a carnivore, the wolf into "steak", and "the culinary fire" into a "fire of pain, of revenge and of death." Also according to Anghelescu, the story implies a "triple sacrilege" in respect to Romanian Orthodox customs: the predator eats his godsons, the goat murders her cumătru, and the wolf's destruction occurs during a funeral feast.

A distinct interpretation of the narrative was provided by Dan Grădinaru, a researcher of Creangă's work, who exposed it to psychoanalytical interpretation and contended that it offers insight into the writer's own childhood (as reflected in Creangă's own Childhood Memories). In his interpretation, the wolf stands for Creangă's father Ştefan, who probably lived separate from Creangă's mother Smaranda, but who may have visited her occasionally for sexual privileges. Grădinaru's version also claims that the author, perceiving the events through a version of the Oedipus complex, cast himself as the youngest kid, and that his escape into the chimney alludes to the maternal vagina. Literary critic Luminița Marcu commends Grădinaru's monograph overall, but argues that such interpretations are speculative, likening them to the esoteric interpretations of philosopher Vasile Lovinescu and to "schoolboy applications of psychoanalytic patterns."

Ion Creangă's tale has left an enduring mark on the Romanian education system. It has been a traditional feature of textbooks and reading recommendations for the youngest students throughout the 20th century, and has remained so into the 21st. A part of this period corresponded to communist rule, during which the text was reportedly given an ideologized interpretation. Discussing the paraliterary propaganda of primers issued under communism as the a "political fairy tale subject to communist legality", literary critic Ion Manolescu referred to a 1986 edition, which featured an adapted and illustrated version of Creangă's tale, as confronting "a patibulary wolf with a bourgeois appearance" to "a goat dressed in peasant costume". "The Goat and Her Three Kids" inspired works in various media from as early as the interwar, when it was turned into a musical theater play for children by Romanian composer Alexandru Zirra. Such derivative works were also produced throughout communism and after the 1989 Revolution. They include Cristian Pepino's puppet theater adaptation, which premiered in 2002.

The tale is part of Ion Creangă's legacy in Romania's literature. In 1968, it was turned into an animated short by filmmaker Anton Mater. A 1978 operatic version was composed by Zlata Tkach, with a libretto by poet Grigore Vieru. Igor Vieru, one of the Moldavian SSR's critically acclaimed visual artists, created illustrations for local editions of the story.

Creanga's literary tale is also classified in the international catalogue of Aarne-Thompson-Uther Index as tale type 123.

== Film Adaptation ==
The short film The Goat and Her Three Kids starring Maia Morgenstern and Marius Bodochi, directed by Victor Canache and produced by Luana Georgiță, premiered in 2019 at the Transilvania International Film Festival. In an endeavor to unveil the true nature of the famed bedtime story, the film aims to treat the audience to a different perspective, one that offers a glimpse at what the mother's tragedy actually looks like beyond the happy songs and colorful characters.

This was followed by the horror film The Goat and Her Three Kids, also with Maia Morgenstern and Marius Bodochi, released in 2022.

== See also ==
- The Wolf and the Seven Young Kids
