= The Wolf and the Seven Young Goats =

German fairy tale

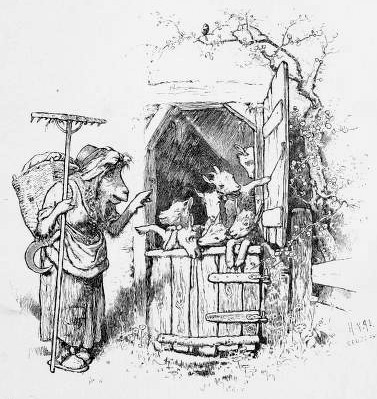
- Illustration by Hermann Vogel

Folk tale
- Name: The Wolf and the Seven Young Goats
- Aarne–Thompson grouping: ATU 123
- Country: Germany
- Published in: Grimm's Fairy Tales

"The Wolf and the Seven Young Goats" (German: Der Wolf und die sieben jungen Geißlein) is a fairy tale collected by the Brothers Grimm and published in Grimm's Fairy Tales (KHM 5). It is of Aarne-Thompson type 123 "The Wolf and the Kids".

== Origin ==
The story was published by the Brothers Grimm in the first edition of Kinder- und Hausmärchen in 1812. Their source was the Hassenpflug family from Hanau. A similar tale, "The Wolf and the Kids", has been told in the Middle East and parts of Europe, and probably originated in the first century.

== Synopsis ==
A mother goat leaves her seven kids at home while she ventures into the forest to find food. Before she leaves, she warns the kids about a wolf who will try to sneak into the house and gobble them up, explaining that he will pretend to be their mother and convince them to open the door and that they will be able to recognize their true mother by her white feet and sweet voice.

Shortly after their mother's departure, they hear a voice at the door offering them gifts. It was the wolf, whose gruff voice betrays him and is denied entry. Determined to get inside the house, the wolf goes to a marketplace, store, or pharmacy and steals chalk, honey, or medicine to soften his voice. A little while later, the kids hear another voice at the door that offers them false promises again. This time the voice is high and sweet like their mother's. They are about to let him in when Benjamin (the youngest goat) looks under the crack in the door and notices the wolf's big, black paws. They refuse to open the door, and the wolf goes away again.

The wolf goes to the bakery or mill and steals some flour, smearing it all over his coat, turning his black feet white. He returns to the children's house, and says "Let me in children, your mother has something for each and every one of you." The kids see his white feet and hear his sweet voice, so they open the door. The wolf jumps into the house and gobbles up six of the kids. The youngest child hides from the wolf in the grandfather clock and does not get eaten.

Later that day, the mother goat returns home from the forest. She is distraught to find the door wide open and all but one of her children missing. She looks around and sees the wolf, fast asleep under a tree. He has eaten so much, he cannot move. The mother goat calls to her youngest child to quickly get her a pair of scissors, a needle and some thread. She cuts open the wolf's stomach and the six children spring out miraculously unharmed. They fill the wolf's belly with rocks, and the mother sews it back up again. When the wolf wakes up, he is very thirsty. He goes to the river to drink, but being so heavy he falls in and drowns under the weight of the rocks.

== Analysis ==
The tale resembles "The Three Little Pigs" and the rescue of the kids from the wolf's belly and his punishment by filling him with stones is comparable to the rescue and revenge of Little Red Cap against the wolf (Aarne-Thompson type 333).

== Variants ==
- An Armenian variant titled The Wolf and the Seven Goats was collected by Hovhannes Tumanyan.
- "The She-Goat, the Kid, and the Wolf" is a variant by Aesop.
- Marie de France included a version, "The Wolf, the Goat, and the Kid," in her collection, Esope.
- Jean de La Fontaine includes a rewriting of Aesop's version under the title "The Wolf, the Goat and the Kid" in the fourth book of his fables; this precise fable forms a diptych with the following one, "The Wolf, the Mother and the Child".
- The thirty-third story in Der Edelstein by Ulrich Boner is a variant.
- A Romanian variant, “Der alte Mann und der Wolf,” ("The Old Man and the Wolf") was published by Heinrich von Wlislocki.
- "The Disobedient Kids" is a Czecho-Slovak variant.
- A variant has been reported to be present in Moroccan folktale collections.
- Hasan El-Shamy located an Egyptian version from Ajhūr al Kubrá, named The Nanny Goat with the Iron Horns.
- Russian folklorist Alexander Afanasyev listed The Wolf and the Kids as another variant.
- A Scottish variant titled "The Grey Goat" was collected by A. Bruford in Scottish Traditional Tales.
- An Iranian variant, The Story of the Wolf and the Goat was collected from Kirmani.

== See also ==
- Big Bad Wolf
- Little Red Riding Hood
- The Boy Who Cried Wolf
- The Goat and Her Three Kids
- Three Little Pigs
- Lonely Castle in the Mirror
