= Romanian profanity =

The following is a list of words and formulations commonly used as profanity throughout Romania.

== Pulă and pizdă ==
The word pulă can be translated into English as dick, cock, or prick and is a vulgar way of referring to the penis. It is most commonly used in expressions such as "în pula mea", which literally translates as in my cock, but has a meaning nearer to the English fuck in that it expresses anger or dissatisfaction. Both "pizdă" and "pulă" can also act as a filler swear word, similar to the English "fucking" or "fuck off".

When said in the indicative mood, as opposed to most profanity in Romanian, which is often in the conjunctive or conditional-optative moods, this expression normally conveys the intention of abandoning a certain course of action or the intention to complete a task with a minimum of effort: "mi-am băgat pula" - literally "I put my dick in", meaning "I did it superficially" (similar to "mi-am băgat picioarele" - "I put my feet in")!

"Pizdă" is most often employed as a swear word in Romanian. Translating as "pussy" or "cunt", it is a vulgar word for the vulva. A common profanity is the phrase "du-te-n pizda mă-tii", meaning "go into your mother's cunt". Another one is "futu-ți pizda mă-tii", "fuck your mother's cunt". These are often shortened to "pizda mă-tii". If the speaker doesn't wish to direct the profanity at their interlocutor, the phrase "pizda mă-sii" is used instead, meaning "his/her/their/its mother's cunt".

Pizdă can also be used as a derogatory term for calling someone a coward. It is commonly used in "Nu fii pizdă" which translates to "don't be a pussy".

== Mother insults ==
One of the variants of this particular insult which is often heard is "morții mă-tii", meaning "your mother's dead [people/relatives]", which can also employed in the third person ("morții mă-sii"). A more "traditional" euphemism for this expression is "paștele mă-tii" ("your mother's Easter"), mainly employed because of its phonetic similarity to pizdă. Another variation on the "mother" theme is "futu-ți dumnezeii mă-tii" which means "fuck your mother's gods".

Shortening this phrase even further yields "mă-ta" (your mother) or "mă-sa" (his/her/its mother). This euphemism is less insulting than the above phrases and often finds its way into informal conversations.

== Profanities referring to sexual intercourse ==
A fute literally means "to fuck" and is used in a variety of expletives. Să te fut translates as "fuck you", but the verb is more commonly used in expressions such as "futu-ți pizda mă-tii" ("fuck your mother's pussy") or just "futu-i" ("fuck it").

Related to a fute are the phrases "a i-o trage cuiva" ("to fuck someone"), "a da la buci" ("to fuck in the ass") and "futai" ("sexual intercourse").

== Other profanities related to sex ==
Romanian insults often involve the sexual behavior of men or women.

Women are usually insulted by comparison to prostitutes. There is a rich vocabulary of insults involving prostitution in Romanian. Curvă is an insult meaning whore or prostitute, or, more generally, a sexually promiscuous woman. Synonyms or near-synonyms are târfă, traseistă, or pizdă. The words zdreanță, boarfă and ștoarfă, coardă are all used to refer to a woman of low moral fiber. A pimp is usually referred to as a pește, which literally translated to "fish".

Profanities directed at men include poponar, curist and găozar, all with the same meaning of faggot. Literally, these words refer to male homosexuals, although they are generally used as insulting words towards any male, no matter their sexual orientation. The words are derived from popou, cur and găoază, which translate to "butt", "ass"/"arse" and "asshole", respectively. All three refer to the anus, implying the person they are directed at practices anal sex.

A womanizer is known as a fustangiu (from fustă, skirt), or pizdar, a word formed in a similar fashion to poponar but which has recently taken on a more positive connotation similar to "player" (Bravo, tată, mare pizdar!).

Bulangiu has quite a complex and contradictory formation. Bulan is slang for "luck" and also for "thigh", bul is also Romani slang for "ass". However, the word bulangiu is used to describe a man who is either not cooperative, a backstabber, or ungrateful, and has roughly the same meaning the English ass has in the phrase "don't be an ass!" (Nu fi bulangiu!). The female version of bulangiu may be bulangioaică or bulangie, but feminine forms are rare.

Lăbar and labagiu refer to a male person practicing masturbation. It carries the same meaning as "moron" or "jerk" in American English, or "wanker" in British English. These words are derived from labă, literally "paw", but referring to masturbation in slang. The expression "a face laba" means "to jerk off". Although they are literally connected to masturbation, in the spoken language they have the same meaning as "jerk", "asshole" or "ass" when referring to an individual.

Muist and its female equivalent, muistă, both mean "blowjob (giver)" often in reference to a whore. These words derive from the interjection muie!, loosely translating to "suck my penis", or, generally, as "up yours!", which is itself derived from Roma slang, muj ([muj]) meaning "mouth" in Romani.

== Profanities unrelated to sex ==
Comparison with animals is another common way of insulting people in Romanian. Scroafă, a word meaning "sow", is often used in the same sense as the English bitch. Men can be insulted with the term bou meaning "castrated bull". Other animals that can be used for insulting people include: goose (gâscă, usually used for women, with the sense "stupid"), donkey (măgar, told to a "stubborn" or "selfish" person, or carrying the same meaning as "asshole!" in English, someone who intentionally hurts the people around him), and pig (porc, for a "careless", "selfish" person, similar to English "motherfucker").

Nenorocit, originally an old popular word that literally translates as "unlucky" and described a disadvantaged or unhappy person (similar to the English phrase "poor devil"), is now used in a powerfully pejorative sense with a meaning similar to "motherfucker" in English. It is used mostly in the vocative case: nenorocitule (male), nenorocito (female).

Death is also a recurring element of most forms of profanity in Romanian. A phrase used when expressing disbelief or sarcasm is "Să mori tu!", or, alternatively, "să moară mă-ta", meaning "should you/your mother die [if what you say is not true]". In the first person, să mor eu ("I should die ..."), it is used to uphold a previous statement.

Long tirades of various forms of profanity strung together into a syntactically correct sentence is also not unheard of, and the Romanian language certainly allows the formation of such structures. An example of this phenomenon is the phrase (Futu-ți) paștele și dumnezeii/Dumnezeul mă-tii astăzi și mâine de nenorocit ("(fuck) your mother's Easter and [her] God/gods today and tomorrow, you asshole"), which can, in theory, be further elaborated. E.g. - Futu-ți Cristoșii mă-tii de căcat rânit cu lopata, meaning (fuck) your mother's Christ, you shit taken off with a shovel.

Other insults are the ones with devils, "Du-te dracu" meaning "go to devil" (similar to "go to hell"). Another is "fir-i-al dracu" meaning "be of the devil", also "fir-ar* dracului" being an expression similar to "darn it". Or "te ia mama dracu" meaning "Devil's mother will take you", being a warning to not do something.

== Euphemisms for profanity ==
The word păsărică (little bird) is a euphemism for pizdă. It is frequently used when addressing children to refer to the vagina. The word puță is a euphemism for pulă. It is often used in conversation with children to refer to the penis.

The word fleașcă translates roughly to soaking wet and may describe something being ruined through soaking or similar means, or "soft/no erect", and it may refer in slang to pussy, with the implication that it is wet or aroused, or to a soft man which does not stand for his rights, with allusion to his "erection". Fofo or fofoloancă, with the approximate meaning "hairy" or "furry", from Romanian "înfofolit", dressed, wrapped (in thick clothes, as in winter), is also another, softer slang word used to refer to vulva or vagina.
