= Cernoleuca =

- Village
- Location within Moldova
- Coordinates: 48.3133333333°N 27.5544444444°E
- Country: Moldova
- District: Dondușeni

Government
  - Mayor: Ala Mazureac (PLDM)

Population (2014 census)
  - Total: 1,572
- Time zone: UTC+2 (EET)
  - Summer (DST): UTC+3 (EEST)

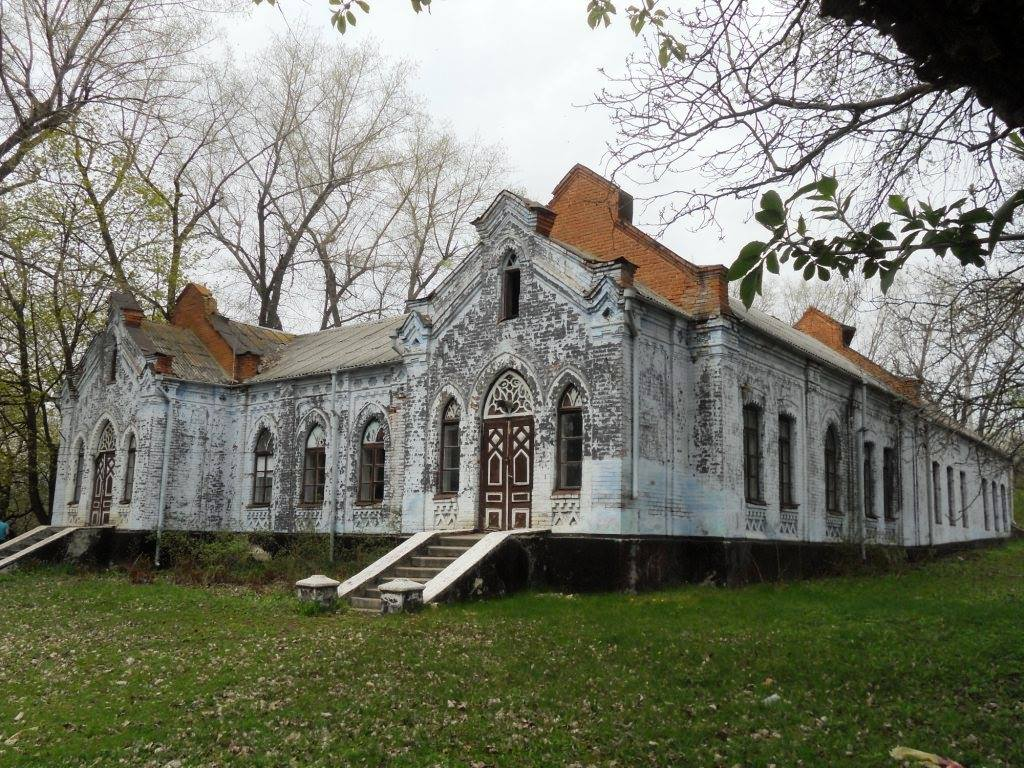
Cazimir mansion in Cernoleuca, Dondușeni District, Moldova.

Cernoleuca is a village in Dondușeni District, Moldova.
