= Igor Vieru =

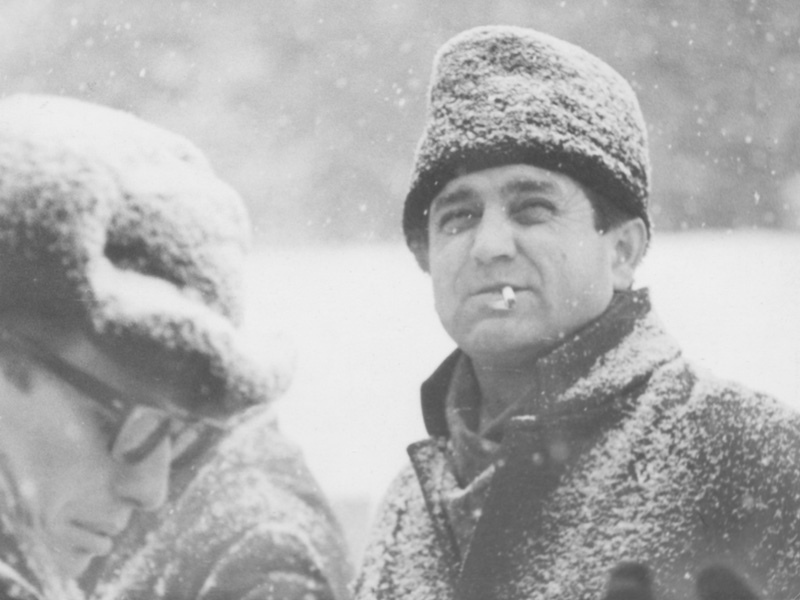
- Vieru in 1970
- Born: December 23, 1923; Cernoleuca, Kingdom of Romania
- Died: May 24, 1988 (aged 64)
- Resting place: Cernoleuca, Dondușeni, Moldova
- Citizenship: Moldova
- Education: Moldova State University
- Occupation: Painter

Igor Vieru (23 December 1923 – 24 May 1988) was a painter from Moldova. The artist's home, in Cernoleuca has become a museum, where visitors can get acquainted with Igor Vieru's art. High School of Fine Arts "Igor Vieru" in Chişinău was named after him.

== Gallery ==
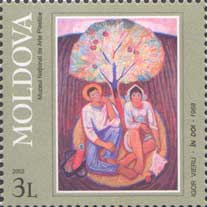
