= Lívia Rusz =

Romanian-Hungarian graphic artist (1930–2020)

- Born: September 28, 1930 Cluj, Kingdom of Romania
- Died: February 26, 2020 (aged 89) Budapest, Hungary
- Area: Artist
- Notable works: Mac, Cocofifi, Dan Buzdugan, Csipike, Miskati közbelép

Lívia or Livia Rusz (Hungarian pronunciation: [liːviɒ rus], Romanian: [ˈlivi.a rus]; September 28, 1930 – February 26, 2020) was a Romanian and Hungarian graphic artist, best known for her work in illustration, comic strip, and comic book genres. One of the most recognizable contributors to these fields during Romania's communist period, she created popular children's comics such as Mac and Cocofifi, before signing as one of the main illustrators for Editura Ion Creangă publishing house. She subsequently produced illustrations for many of the company's principal releases, including an edition of Ion Creangă's Childhood Memories and the first Romanian-language edition of J. R. R. Tolkien's The Hobbit.

A member of the Hungarian-Romanian community, Rusz escaped communist political pressures by settling in Budapest, Hungary in 1987. She continued to live there, and has also become recognized as a contributor to the Hungarian comics school.

== Biography ==
Born in Cluj (Kolozsvár), Lívia Rusz was from a Hungarian-Romanian family. She grew up in a mixed environment, among local Hungarians and Romanians, and, according to her own recollection: "My road was opened by a school with exceptional spirituality, where I was taught to respect and maintain traditions, to treasure the eternal cultural values, to preserve and take care of our identity so as not to offend the others". Her father, Liviu, was a Romanian Railways employee, amateur artist and calligrapher, who had undergone formal training with painter Sándor Szopos. Rusz was herself avid to train in visual art, copying his paintings, learning how to use watercolors, and entering a class run by Szopos. After graduating from primary school, Rusz continued her education at a high school in her native city, where her talents brought her to the attention of painter and academic Zoltán Kovács. On Kovács' personal recommendation, she applied for the Cluj Art Institute upon passing her baccalaureate examination, and completed her training in 1955. She declared herself "lucky" to have been taught by Kovács, "an artist with virtues recognized even by those who undermined him". As a result of this training and influence, she came to define herself as a "conservative", who did not "renew [herself] whenever the fashion changes." Rusz was Assistant at the Institute for the following three years, losing her post to an administrative restructuring.

At that stage in her life, Lívia Rusz began collaborating with specialized magazines for children. With time, her work in the comics genre came to be influenced by Jean Cézard, French creator of Arthur le fantôme justicier for Pif gadget, and one of the few foreign cartoonists to be known in Romania. The first local publication to employ Rusz was the Hungarian-language Napsugár, where she first met writer Sándor Fodor, with whom she collaborated on the cycle of books Csipike (known as Piticul Cipi in Romanian). This contribution brought her to the attention of Lucia Olteanu, editor of Luminița, a Bucharest-based and Romanian-language periodical. Rusz accepted the offer of collaboration, and, with Olteanu, created the comic strips Rățoiul Mac ("Mac the Duck"; Hungarian: Mákvirág) and Cocofifi (or Kokó). These earned Rusz a large following among the young public, and she also began collaborating with the youth journals Arici Pogonici and Cutezătorii. Her other projects in comics included a rendition of L. Frank Baum's The Wonderful Wizard of Oz, as well as the comic strips Maimuța Kio ("Kio the Monkey", with a text by Ovidiu Zotta), redrawings of the Mac and Cocofifi originals, and Dan Buzdugan ("Dan the Mace", a medieval fantasy series, distinguished among her contributions for its more realistic visual style).

By then, Rusz had also started work in illustration, primarily as a cover artist for various local publishing houses, including Editura Ion Creangă and Editura Tineretului. Her work was remarked by writer and Ion Creangă manager Tiberiu Utan, and Rusz became a permanent collaborator of the brand. During her time with Editura Ion Creangă, she applied her art to editions of Wilhelm Hauff's Märchen (as Basme), and reprints of classical works for children in Romanian literature: Nicolae Constantin Batzaria's Poveşti de aur ("Golden Stories") and Ion Creangă's collected fairy tales and Childhood Memories. Also during that interval, Lívia Rusz became the first Romanian illustrator of J. R. R. Tolkien's work, when she contributed drawings for The Hobbit (in its original 1975 edition, marketed by Editura Ion Creangă). While working on this project, she was reportedly unable to compare her renditions of hobbits, Elves or Orcs with any previous portrayals by other artists, owing to the scarcity of foreign literature sources in Romania—her work therefore owed much to imagination. In 1987, two years before the December Revolution toppled communism, Rusz decided to leave Romania for West Germany. This gesture was a consequence of nationalist and national communist policies adopted by the regime of Nicolae Ceaușescu and specifically targeting some of Romania's ethnic minorities. According to writer György Györfi-Deák, Ceaușescu "gave a hard time to the Hungarians", and Rusz personally was "harassed by the dictator's politruks and Securitate men". After a short stay in Germany, Rusz settled in Budapest, Hungary, where she owned a villa. She continued her activity, becoming a noted contributor to the Hungarian comic school (with albums such as Miskati közbelép, "Miskati Intervenes"). The change was described by the artist herself as a difficult one: "Even plants will suffer when moved from one pot to another; it was not easy for me either to build up my new roots, but as long as forces permit me and I can still work it means I am alive."

== Cultural impact ==
In Romania itself, where she was among the few female comics artists, Lívia Rusz has come to be described as a leading contributor to the genres she covered in her work. Györfi-Deák wrote: "throughout her long artistic career, Rusz Lívia has been leading us through an enchanted universe, depicted with unique sensitivity and grace, unveiling through drawings all that is beautiful and worthy in the world". Noted by visual artist Arina Stonescu as one of the three main illustrators employed by Editura Ion Creangă (alongside Val Munteanu and Eugen Taru), she drew particular critical attention for Childhood Memories. Deemed "legendary" by Györfi-Deák, the volume also led Stonescu to write: "I often imagine the fascinating world of the storyteller Ion Creangă only populated by Livia Rusz's girls and boys in national costumes."

Rusz was described as "the greatest creator of comic strips in Romania" by comics historiographer Dodo Niță, who granted Mac and Cocofifi the second place in an all-time chart of Romanian comics. Her activity under communism nevertheless coincided with a decline in the overall impact of Romanian comics: while exercising ideological control over the comic strip scene, the Romanian Communist Party reputedly preferred to invest in animation, seeing it as a more effective propaganda tool. In this context, Rusz and Eugen Taru were among those who still produced comics able to reach the general public (a category which also included, according to one assessment, Ion Deak, Pompiliu Dumitrescu, Puiu Manu, Vintilă Mihăescu, Dumitru Negrea, and Ion Popescu-Gopo). Her work in the field was also subject to a post-1989 revival in interest. It was a feature of reference works published in 1996 and 2005 by Dodo Niță, and the artist herself a special guest at the Romanian-Hungarian Comics Salon, organized in Budapest by the Romanian Cultural Institute. Niţă also joined up with Ferenc Kiss to write and publish the first monograph on Rusz, which saw print in 2009. It included homage pieces from two of her fans, historian Adrian Cioroianu and writer-diplomat Mircea Opriță. In reference to the artist's overall contribution, the latter noted: "In addition to talent, an artist specializing in graphic art for children needs to have an outstanding soul."

Lívia Rusz first became known outside Hungary and Romania during the 1970s and '80s, when Mac or Cofofifi were translated into English, German, Russian and Spanish. The 1980s version of the two volumes were published in countries of the Eastern Bloc and beyond (in Hungary, East Germany and Cuba). While the Tolkien edition registered much success in Romania, it became internationally known only in the decades after 1989, when Rusz's illustrations were republished by Douglas A. Anderson.
