= Atlantykron =

Summer learning academy in Romania

- Location within Romania
- Coordinates: 44°30′2.05″N 28°4′34.69″E
- Country: Romania
- Time zone: UTC+2 (EET)
  - Summer (DST): UTC+3 (EEST)

Atlantykron is an annual Summer Academy of Learning in Romania, sponsored by David Lewis Anderson's World Genesis Foundation, with support from the Romanian National Commission for UNESCO.

Atlantykron is held on an island on the Danube River near the village and ancient Roman ruins of Capidava in Romania. The first Atlantykron summer academy was held in the summer of 1989. Since then, Atlantykron has attracted hundreds of youths and teachers from all around the world who seek the opportunity to meet, interact and learn together with scientists, artists, writers and other professionals in a learning experience held in a wilderness setting.

In 2001 Atlantykron was the host of Eurocon, the annual European science fiction convention coordinated by the European Science Fiction Society.

== Guests ==
1989: Alexandru Mironov, Aurel Carasel, Sorin Repanovici, Gabriel Grosu, Simona Vladareanu, Aida Gusan Cristian Panfilov
1990: Valentin M. Ionescu, Alexandru Mironov, Aurel Carasel, Sorin Repanovici, Ovidiu Petcu
1991: Stefan Ghidoveanu, Mihaela Muraru Mandrea, Dan Merisca, Lucian Merisca, Romulus Bărbulescu, George Anania
1992: Valentin Nicolau, Roberto Quaglia, Mihaela Muraru Mandrea
1993: Florin Munteanu, Dan Milici, Bridget Wilkeson, Aurel Manole, Victor Sutac
1994: Aurel Manole, Bridget Wilkeson
1995: Florin Munteanu, Pierre de Hillerin
1996: Roberto Quaglia, Cristian Parghie
1997: Alain Le Bussy, Dan Milici
1998: Mihnea Muraru Mandrea
1999: David Lewis Anderson, Mihai Manea, Emil Strainu
2000: Edie Statescu, Mihai Manea, Emil Strainu
2001: Joe Haldeman, Ion Hobana, Norman Spinrad, David Lewis Anderson, Mircea Nanu-Muntean, Adriana Gheorghe
2002: Randy Gordon, Mihaela Muraru Mandrea
2003: Robert Sheckley, Dan Farcas
2004: Lucian Biro, Wilhelm Frey, Iona Frey
2005: Theodor Vasile, Vilmos Zsombori, Cristian Carstoiu, Viorel Lazar, Valentin Tanase
2006: Sibylle Colberg, Wilhelm Frey, Paul Rosner, Daniela Pascu
2007: Chan Chow Wah, Dan Lucas, Gyuri Pascu, Norman Rosner
2008: Joel Castellenos, Peter Moon, Viviana Vladutescu, Casper Werner
2009: Edward Belbruno, Corneliu Chisu, Mary Ann Martini, Cristian Gretcu, Caresella Craciun

== Management ==
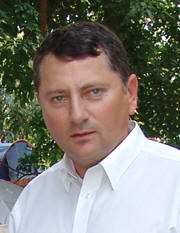
Sorin Repanovici, Vice President, World Genesis Foundation and General Program Coordinator of the Atlantykron Summer Academy

The Atlantykron summer academy is coordinated by Sorin Repanovici, Vice President of David Lewis Anderson's World Genesis Foundation, which became the key organization coordinating international participation and funding for Atlantykron beginning in 1999. The Academy was founded in 1989 by Alexandru Mironov, Aurel Carasel, and Sorin Repanovici. In 2009, the Academy celebrated its 20th anniversary in which Sorin Repanovici also received the "Lifetime of Hope" award for his personal and professional contributions in creating new hope and opportunities for youth in the world. The Lifetime of Hope award was established by the Norman Rosner family in honor of Paul Rosner, president of the U.S. Kickboxing Association and Senior Director of the World Genesis Foundation.

The primary program organizers today are:

- Center for Complexity Studies
- Cygnus Scientific Society
- Living Through Arts
- Romanian Sports and Culture Association
- World Genesis Foundation
- United States Kickboxing Association
