= List of Romanian science fiction writers =

Some notable science fiction authors are (in alphabetical order):

== A ==
- Felix Aderca
- George Anania
- Victor Anestin
- Mihai Alexandru
- Sorin Antohi
- Gheorghe Apostol

== B ==
- Romulus Bărbulescu
- Rodica Bretin

== C ==
- Mircea Cărtărescu
- Vladimir Colin
- Ovid S. Crohmălniceanu

== D ==
- Doru Davidovici

== G ==
- Radu Pavel Gheo

== H ==
- Ion Hobana

== L ==
- George Lazăr

== M ==
- Alexandru Mironov
- Nina Munteanu

== O ==
- Mircea Opriță

== P ==
- Ovidiu Pecican
- Cristian Tudor Popescu

== R ==
- Liviu Radu

== S ==
- Bogdan Suceavă

== T ==
- Radu Theodoru

== See also ==
- Women science fiction authors
- List of science fiction editors
- Novelists
- List of fantasy authors
- List of horror fiction authors
- List of military science fiction works and authors
- List of Clarion South Writers Workshop Alumni
- Lists of authors
- List of science fiction authors
- Internet Speculative Fiction DataBase
- Category:Science fiction writers
- Category:French science fiction writers
- Black science fiction
