= Trifești =

Trifești may refer to several places in Romania:

- Trifești, Iași, a commune in Iași County
- Trifești, Neamț, a commune in Neamț County
- Trifești, a village in Horea Commune, Alba County
- Trifești, a village in Lupșa Commune, Alba County

and to:

- Trifești, Rezina, a commune in Rezina district, Moldova

== See also ==
- Trifa (surname)
- Trifănești
