= Ion Creangă House =

Home of Ion Creangă, Romania

- Casa memorială Ion Creangă (Romanian)
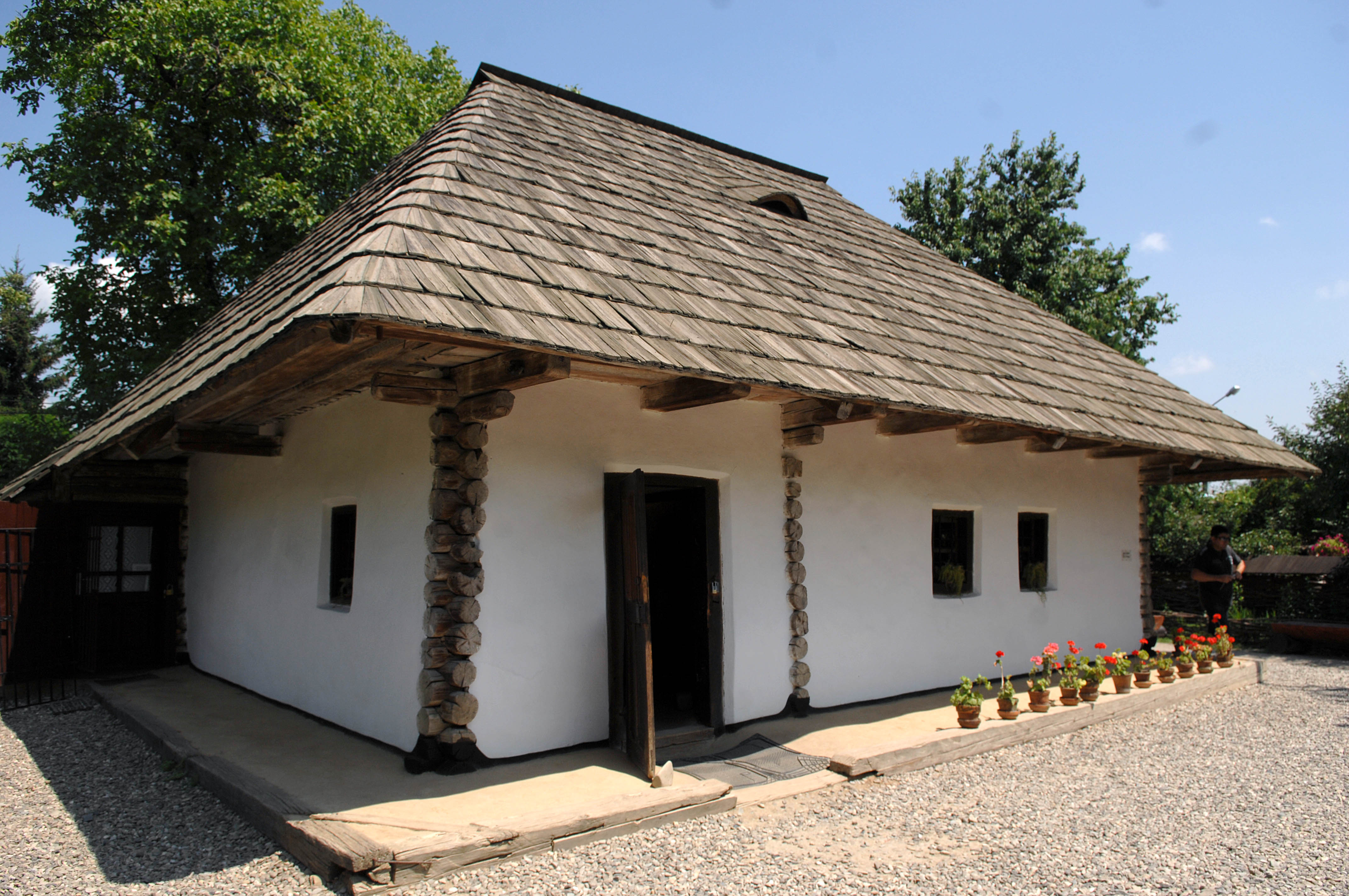
- Creangă's house
- Interactive map of Ion Creangă House
- 47.1976°N 26.3549°E
- Location: 8 Ion Creangă Street, Humulești, Neamț County, Romania

History
- Built: 1830–1831
- Built for: Petre Ciubotariu (Ion Creangă's maternal grandfather)

Site notes
- Governing body: Ministry of Culture and National Patrimony (Romania)

Monument istoric
- Type: Architectural Monument of National Interest
- Designated: 1951
- Part of: National Register of Historic Monuments (Romanian: Lista Monumentelor Istorice (LMI))
- Reference no.: NT-IV-m-A-10763

The Memorial House of Ion Creangă is a Historic Monument located in Humulești, Romania. The building was the home of Romanian writer Ion Creangă in the latter's childhood from his birth in 1837 until 1855.

The dating of the house as indicated in the National Register of Historic Monuments in Romania (LMI) is 1833, it being located on Ion Creangă Street no. 8. Ion Creangă lived here permanently from his birth in 1837 until 1846, then intermittently until 1855. The memorial house-museum is featured on the List of Historical Monuments in Neamț County since 2004.

== History ==
=== Architecture ===
The building is a log construction with a shingle roof. It was inhabited until 1959 by the descendants of the Creangă family, being restored in 1937 by the care of Romanian prime minister Nicolae Iorga. Other restorations took place in 1960, 1975 and 1988.

The building consists of two small rooms and a porch. The tourist attraction holds a valuable permanent exhibition, reorganized thematically after 1989, which includes archival documents, letters, autograph postcards, photocopies of manuscripts, photographs and 14 graphic works. Next to the museum is the "Ion Creangă" Theme Park, a place where visitors can meet beloved characters from children's stories written by Ion Creangă.

The house has a wide thatched roof under which are solid walls made of thick beams over which a layer of clay has been laid. The short entrance is sheltered from the torrential rains by an eaves a few hands wide, and behind the house a cover of rapidly sloping boards protects several household objects and agricultural implements of some ethnographic value.

=== House history ===
"I don't know what other people are like, but me, when I think about the place of my birth, at my parents' house in Humulești, at the chimney pole where my mother used to tie a rope with balls to the end, where the cats were playing with them, at the little hummed hearth, which I used to hold on to when I learned how to walk, to the oven in which I hid, when we, the boys, were playing, and other games full of childish fun and charm, it fills my heart with joy!"

— Ion Creangă in his autobiography "Amintiri din Copilările" released in 1892.

The Ion Creangă memorial house was built between 1830 and 1831 by Petre Ciubotariu, the writer's maternal grandfather. He inherited it to his son Ștefan, who in 1835 married Smaranda, the daughter of David Creangă from Pipirig. Ion Creangă lived here permanently from birth until 1846, then intermittently until 1855, when he left for Iași, to study at the Socola Mică Church. After the death of Creangă's parents Ștefan a Petri and Smaranda, the house was inherited by their youngest daughter, Ileana. DUe to having no heirs, she donated it to her niece, Sofia, the daughter of Maria, another sister of Creangă. The building was restored in 1937 by the care of the historian Nicolae Iorga. In 1944, Sofia Grigoriu (born Creangă), donated the house to the Romanian Teachers' Association. The house was further cared for by two of Sofia's children, Zahei and Antonică Grigoriu, and functioned unofficially as a museum until 1951. Then, on Zahei's initiative, the actual opening of the current memorial museum took place. The most important repairs (further restorations took place in 1960 and 1988) took place in 1975, when the roof was restored and the ceiling replaced.

The main personalities involved in the organization of the thematic exhibition of the museum and in the collection of the ethnographic objects necessary for the organization of the exhibition were Z. Grigoriu (descendant of Ion Creangă) and priest Cosma of Humulești. It exhibits objects that belonged to the Creangă family, several of them being a spinning wheel, a water cleaning wheel, pottery and original furniture. The house also hosts a souvenir store with autographed postcards, school textbooks ("New method of writing and reading"; "Children's education"; "Geography of Iași County"), graphics by Eugen Taru (12 works inspired by "Childhood Memories").

== Reception ==
The house soon became one of the most visited memorial museums in Neamț County. It is also one of the most visited museums in Romania, with more than 40,000 autohton and foreign tourists crossing its threshold annually. Every year, the house sponsors the "Creangă Days" events, as well as other cultural activities such as museum evenings, themed exhibitions, conferences, symposia organized at the headquarters of the "Ion Creangă" Cultural Foundation in Târgu Neamț or at local schools.

== Gallery ==
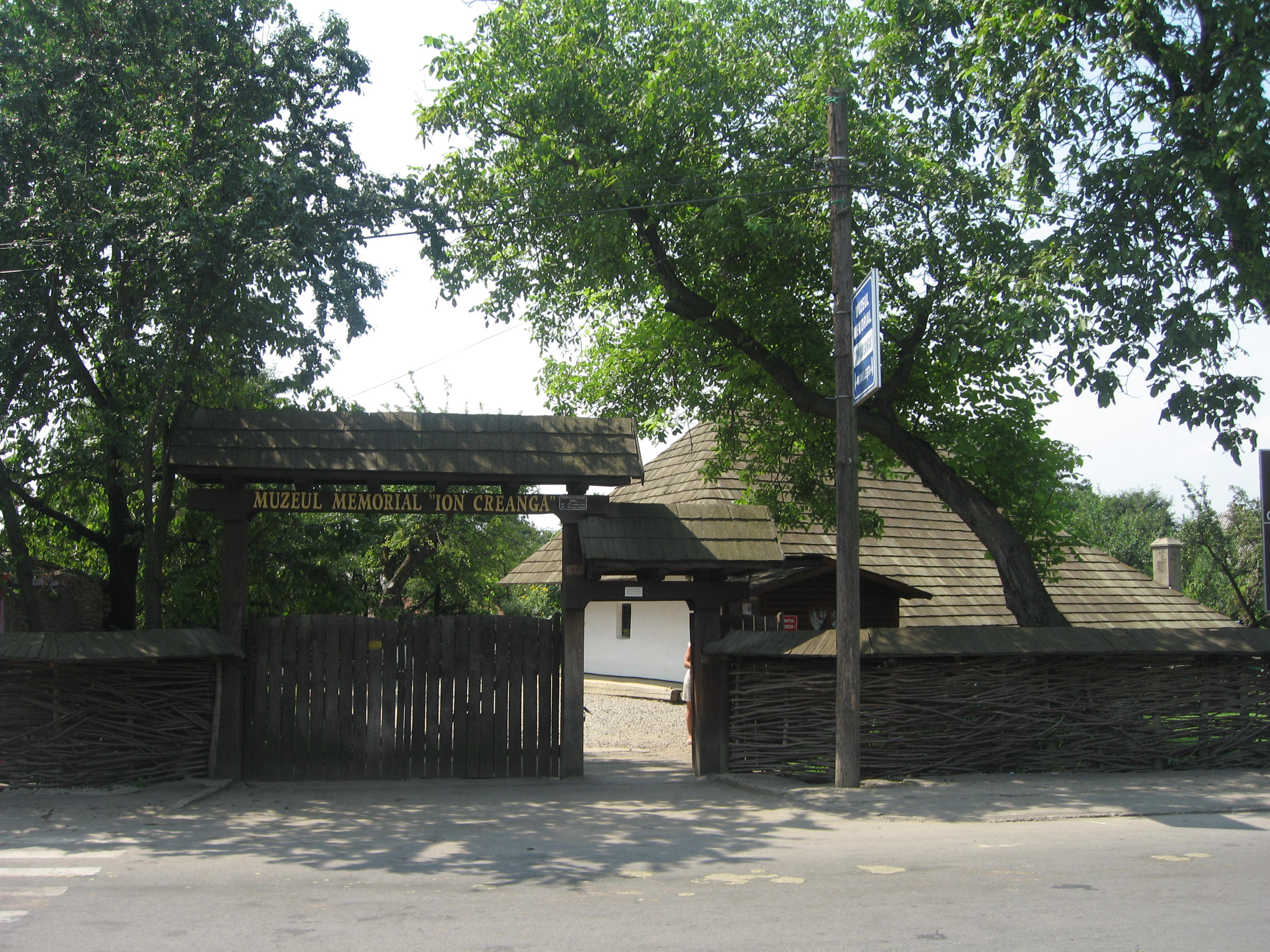
Street view of the house

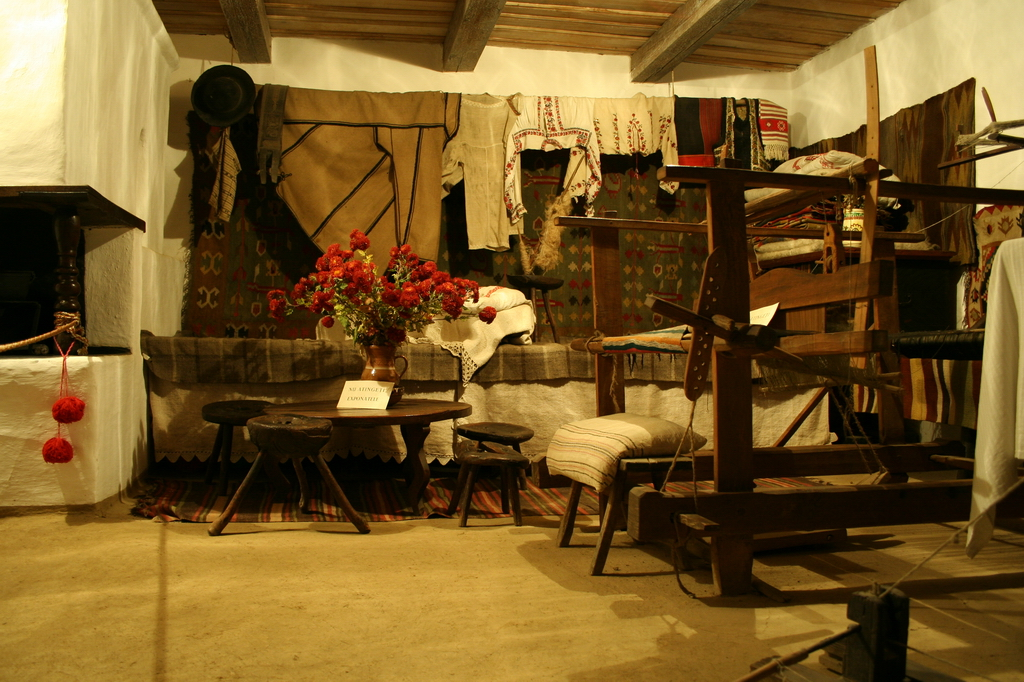
The large room

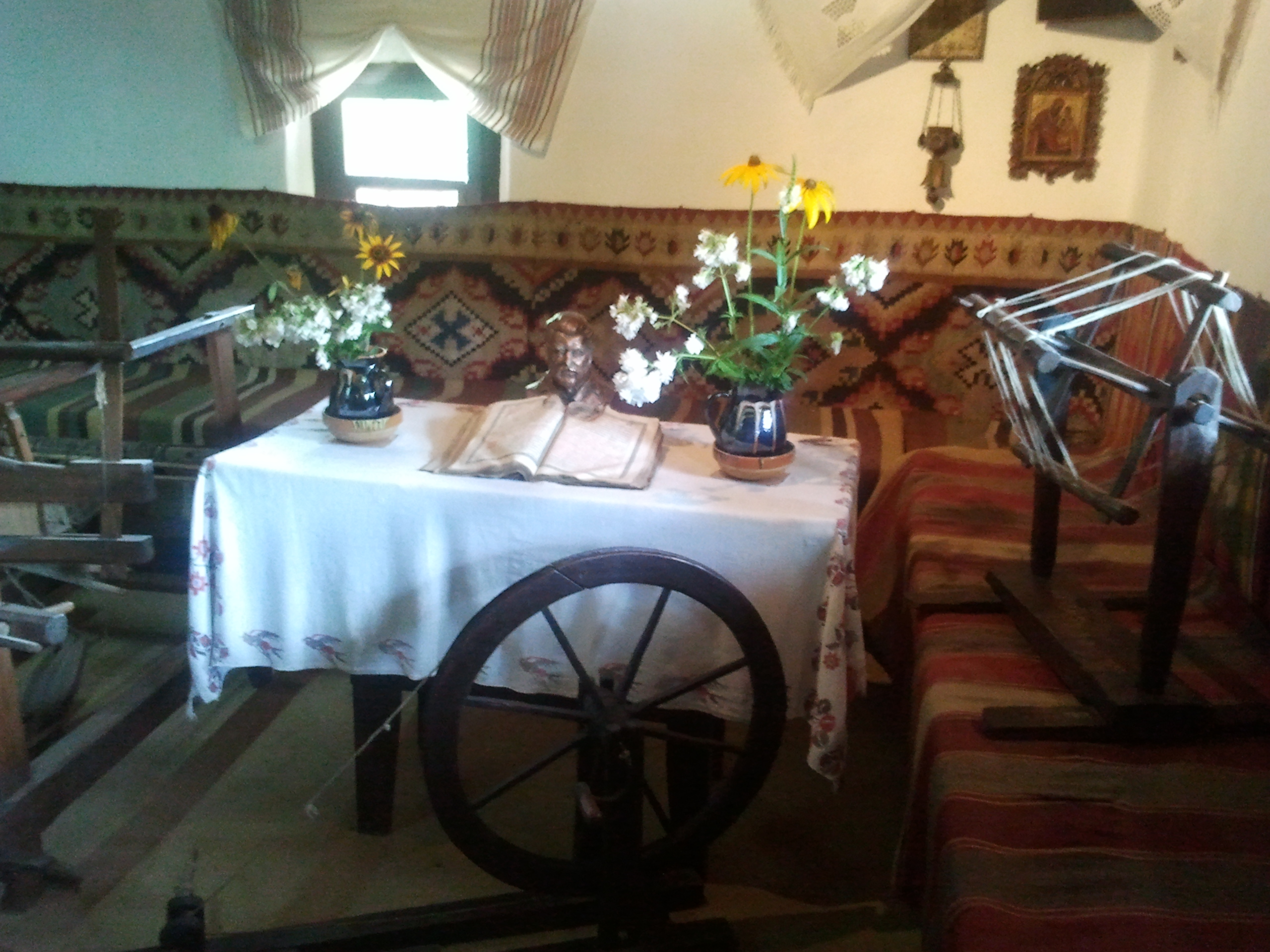
The small room

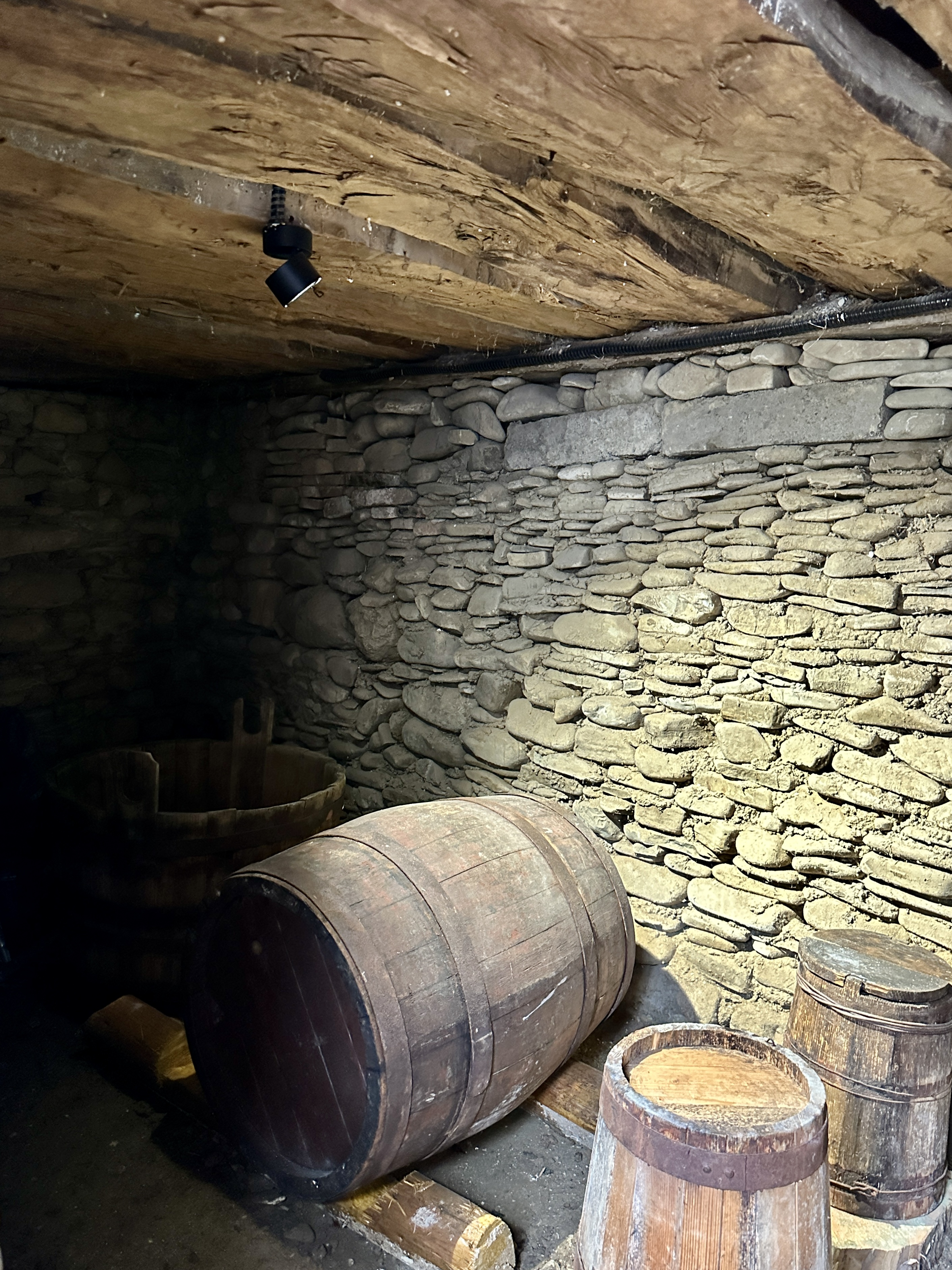
The cellar

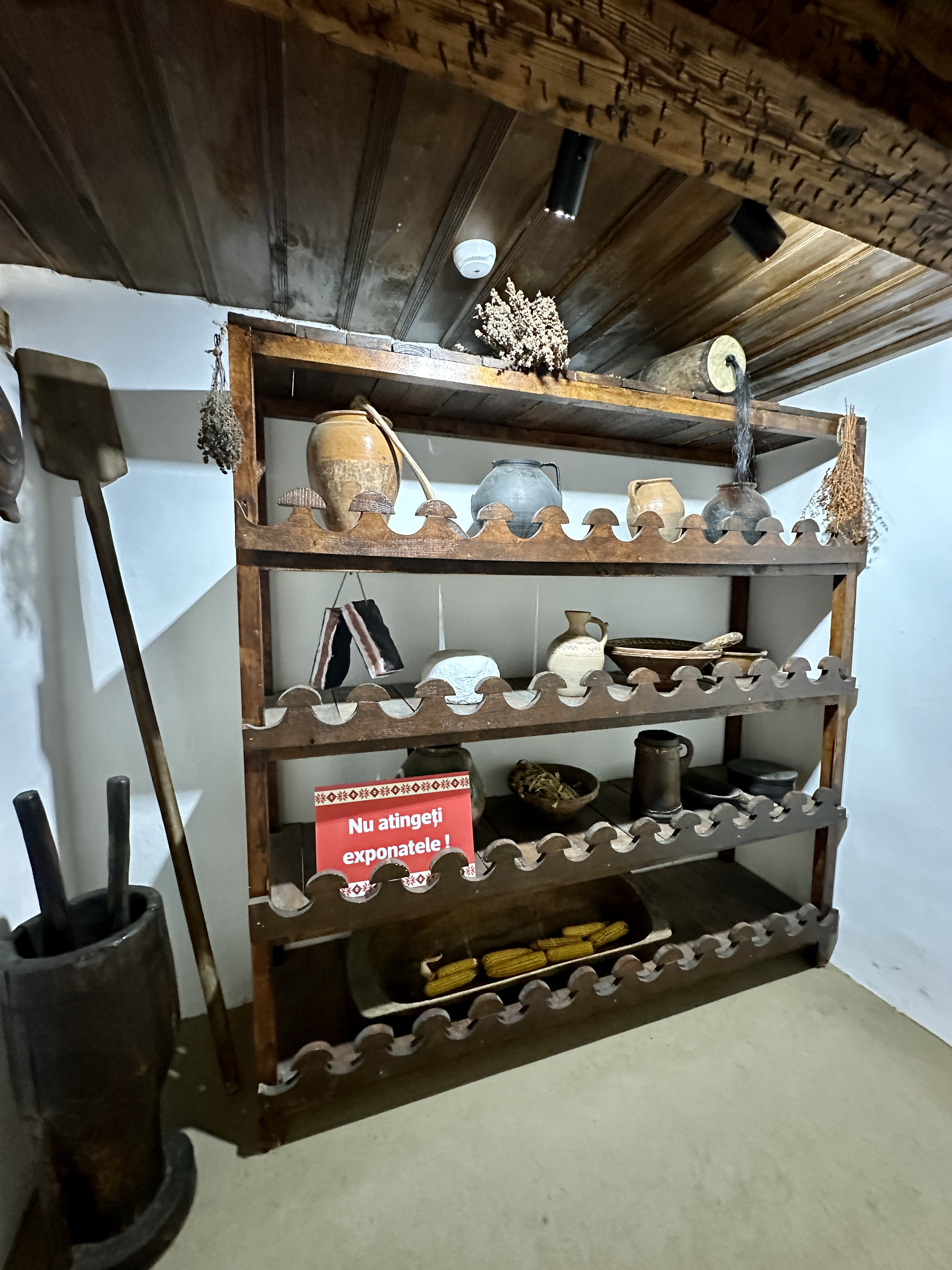
The storage room

== See also ==
- List of monumente istorice in Romania
