= Ailincăi =

Ailincăi is a Romanian surname. Notable people with the surname include:

- Adriana Ailincăi (born 1999), Romanian rower
- Crina Pintea-Ailincăi (born 1990), Romanian handball player
- Dumitru Ailincăi (1908–1995), pen name of a Romanian journalist, novelist, historian and writer
