= Romulus Bărbulescu =

Romanian writer

- Born: October 27, 1925; Sulina, Romania
- Died: February 9, 2010; Bucharest
- Occupations: short story writer, novelist, translator
- Writing career
- Period: 1963–2010
- Genre: science fiction

Romulus Bărbulescu (October 27, 1925, Sulina – February 9, 2010, Bucharest) was a Romanian science-fiction writer.

In 1963, Bărbulescu published "Constellations from the Waters," the first of 10 science fiction novels that established him and his co-author, George Anania, as pioneers of the genre in Romania. They drew their inspiration from Russian writers like Ivan Efremov or Arkady and Boris Strugatsky, or the Polish author Stanislaw Lem. In a communist society where criticizing current social norms was forbidden, alternative reality was good metaphor, and even better, safe. In the 1980s, the government of Romanian President Nicolae Ceaușescu took control of Anania and Bărbulescu's fan clubs to monitor discussions on utopian societies and social justice.

== Published books ==
- 1983 – Catharsis, editura Albatros, Bucharest
- 1991 – Încotro curge liniștea?, editura Ion Creangă, Bucharest
- 1993 – Golful ucigașilor, editura Porto-Franco, Galați

=== With George Anania ===
- Constelația din ape (1962), Colecția "Povestiri științifico-fantastice" nr. 174-179 (en. Constellations from the Waters)
- Statuia șarpelui (1967), Editura Tineretului
- Doando (1969) – Editura Tineretului
- Planeta umbrelelor albastre (1969), Colecția "Povestiri științifico-fantastice" nr. 356-359
- Ferma oamenilor de piatră (1970), Editura Tineretului (en. The Stone Men Farm)
- Paralela-enigmă (1973), Editura Tineretului
- Șarpele blând al infinitului (1977)
- Cât de mic poate fi infernul? (1993), Editura Odeon

== See also ==
- George Anania
- List of Romanian science fiction writers
