= Ovidiu Zotta =

Romanian writer of children's stories and editor

Ovidiu Zotta (1935–1996) was a Romanian writer of children's stories and an editor, scriptwriter and comic strip designer. In the late 1960s he created a character, "Dim Dunăreanu" who was a superhero for children and has been called the "Romanian James Bond". Zotta wrote under a pseudonym, Sandu Alexandru, often simultaneously with his given name.

== Biography ==
Ovidiu Zotta was born on 30 May 1935.

In 1948 comic book publications in Romania ceased and a ban prevailed until the early 1960s. In the late 1960s and early 1970s a new genre of children's magazines emerged in such publications as Cravata roşie, Cutezătorii, and Luminiţa. The magazines were censored, but publication of comics soon soared. Zotta began drawing comics during this period as well as writing scripts. In 1967, using his pseudonym Sandu Alexandru, Zotta created a serial strip Aventurile lui Manolică, drawn by Bursch, along with the strip Vacanţele unui tânăr liniştit collaborating with Puiu Manu, who was using the pseudonym Vasile Baciu. This strip would be very important, as it was the birth of the comic strip character called "Dim Dunăreanu". Dunăreanu was an action hero created in the 1960s model. A communist children's hero, who was able to resolve serious situations without guns or blood but through his physical characteristics. Though Zotta created the character, other writers, like Puiu Manu wrote adventures for him. The character has been called the "Romanian James Bond".

In the late 1970s, Zotta was acting as editor-in-chief of Cutezătorii and was also writing and drawing comic strips under the pseudonym "Sandu Alexandru". In 1978, he wrote the screenplay for Dan Mironescu's filming of Jachetele galbene, a movie based on Zotta's novel, Operaţiunea Hercule (Operation Hercules). He began to do a comic strip in the 1990s for Universul Copiilor called "Aventurile lui Teddy Ted" (The adventures of Teddy Ted).

In addition to his work on comic strips, Zotta published children's literature. The literary magazine Observator Cultural listed Zotta as one of the leading writers of children's literature in Romania, among others such as Dumitru Almaș, Călin Gruia, Gica Iuteș, Octav Pancu-Iași, and Mircea Sântimbreanu.

Zotta died in 1996.

== Selected works ==
=== Books ===
- Toți băieții sînt răi, toți băieții sînt buni Editura Ion Creangă: Bucharest (1970) (in Romanian)
- O şansă pentru fiecare Editura Ion Creangă: Bucharest (1973) (in Romanian)
- Operațiunea Hercule Editura Albatros: Bucharest (1973) (in Romanian)
- Alexandru cel argintiu Editura Ion Creangă: Bucharest (1976) (in Romanian)
- ("O şansă pentru fiecare" Translated by Cseke Gábor) Ló a pincében Editura Ion Creangă: Bucharest (1976) (in Hungarian)
- ("Toți băieții sînt răi, toți băieții sînt buni" Translated by Natalie Alver) Kõik poisid on halvad, kõik poisid on head Eesti Raamat: Tallinn (1979) (in Estonian)
- Jucătorul de rezervă Editura Ion Creangă: Bucharest (1980) (in Romanian)
- Spadasinul de serviciu Editura Ion Creangă: Bucharest (1984) (in Romanian)
- Insigna de pilot Editura Ion Creangă: Bucharest (1989) (in Romanian)

=== Screenplay ===
- "Jachetele galbene" (1979)
