= Childhood Memories (book) =

Romanian book

- Cover of the 1959 edition (as Amintiri din copilărie), published by Editura Tineretului; cover art by Eugen Taru
- Author: Ion Creangă
- Original title: Amintiri din copilărie
- Language: Romanian
- Genre: memoir
- Publication place: Romania
- Media type: print

Childhood Memories (also known as Recollections of Childhood, Memories of My Childhood or Memories of My Boyhood; Romanian: Amintiri din copilărie, pronounced [aminˈtirʲ din kopiləˈri.e]) is one of the main literary contributions of Romanian author Ion Creangă. The largest of his two works in the memoir genre, it includes some of the most recognizable samples of first-person narratives in Romanian literature, and is considered by critics to be Creangă's masterpiece. Structured into separate chapters written over several years (from 1881 to ca. 1888), it was partly read in front of the Junimea literary club in Iași. While three of the total four section were published in Creangă's lifetime by the Junimea magazine Convorbiri Literare, the final part was left incomplete by the writer's death.

The book offers an in-depth account of Ion Creangă's early life in what was then the state of Moldavia, with much insight into the social landscape of his childhood universe, describing relationships between its hero, mainly referred to with his hypocorism and patronymic Nică al lui Ștefan a Petrei or Nic-a lui Ștefan a Petrei ("Nică of Ștefan of Petru"), and the various people in his life. It traces Nică's coming of age passage, from an idyllic age spent the remote village of Humulești (now part of Târgu Neamț town) to rebellious adolescence and training for a Romanian Orthodox priesthood in the urban centers of Fălticeni and Iași. The narrative flow is often interrupted by lengthy and characteristic soliloquies, imparting Creangă's worldview and regrets. The text itself is noted for its characteristic use of the Romanian lexis, including its accomplished rendition of Moldavian dialectal particularities.

Childhood Memories went through several editions since its 1890s reprint, and came to be seen as a classic of local children's literature. It was an inspiration for several authors, and was the basis for Elisabeta Bostan's 1964 film Amintiri din copilărie.

== Narrative ==
=== First chapter ===
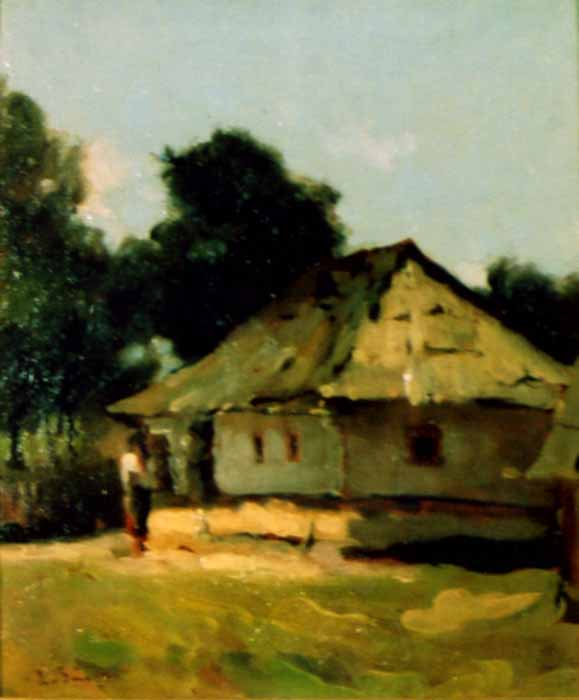
Casa din Humulești ("The House in Humulești"), painting by Aurel Băeșu

Creangă's account opens with an extended soliloquy and a nostalgic description of his native area, with a short overview of Humulești's history and his family's social status. The first chapter introduces and focuses on several characters directly linked to Nică's earliest school years: Vasile an Ilioaei, the young teacher and Orthodox cleric, who enlists him in the new class; Vasile's supervisor, the stern parson; Smărăndița, the intelligent but misbehaved daughter of the priest; Creangă's father Ștefan and mother Smaranda. One of the first episodes detailed by the book relates to corporal punishment as recommended by the priest: children were made to sit on a chair known as Calul Balan ("White Horse") and strapped with a device called Sfântul Nicolai (or "Saint Nicholas", after the school's patron saint). The fragment is also a humorous retrospective account of his interactions with other children, from their favorite pastimes (trapping flies with the horologion) to Creangă's crush on Smărăndița and the misuse of corporal punishment by a jealous peer tutor. Creangă recounts his early disappointment with school activities and appetite for truancy, noting that his motivations for attending were the promise of a priest's career, the close supervision of his mother, the prospects of impressing Smărăndița, and the material benefits of singing in the choir. School is however abruptly interrupted when Vasile an Ilioaei is lassoed off the street and forcefully drafted into the Moldavian military.

After spending some time being tutored by teacher Iordache, whom the text depicts as a drunk, a sudden outbreak of cholera kills his teacher and pushes Smaranda and Ștefan to send their child out of the village. Nică follows the path of transhumance and is assigned to the care of shepherds, but he himself falls ill with what the narrator claims was cholera, and, upon returning home with a high fever, is instantly cured with a folk remedy of vinegar and lovage. A while after, claiming insolvency, Ștefan withdraws his son from school. Owing to Smaranda's persistence, the child follows his maternal grandfather David Creangă to Broșteni, where he and his cousin Dumitru are enlisted in a more affordable establishment. This requires adaptation on the part of Nică and Dumitru, both of whom weep once their long hair is shaved off on the new teacher's orders. They are both hosted by a middle-aged woman, Irinuca, in a small house on the Bistrița, where their proximity to goats results in a scabies infection. Creangă then recounts how, while attempting to cure themselves with frequent baths in the river, he and his cousin dislodged a cliff which rolled down and tore through Irinuca's household. After leaving Broșteni in a hurry and spending a while in Borca, the two children hasten for David Creangă's home in Pipirig. After an eventful trip through the Eastern Carpathians, the two boys arrive in the village, where they are welcomed by David's wife Nastasia. She cures their scabies using another local remedy, birch extract.

=== Second chapter ===
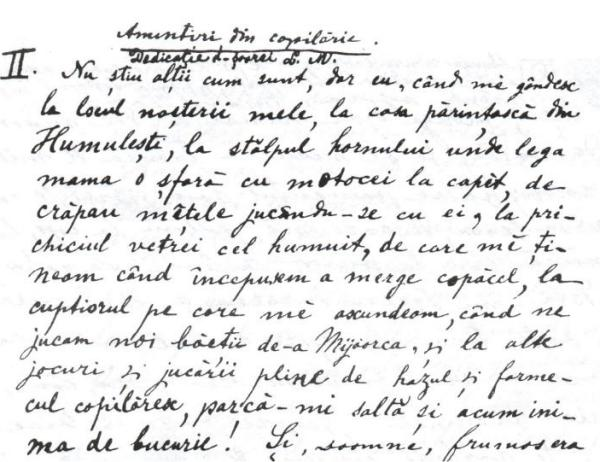
Introductory section of the Childhood Memories second chapter, in its manuscript form

The second section opens with another nostalgic soliloquy, which famously begins with the words: "I wouldn't know what other people are like, but for myself, when I start thinking about my birthplace, Humulești, about the post holding the flue of the stove, round which mother used to tie a piece of string with tassels at the end of it, with which the cats played till they plopped, the earthen ledge of the stove that I used to cling to when I was learning to walk with my head held high, the place on top of the stove where I used to hide when we children played at hide-and-seek, as well as other games and delights full of childlike fun and charm, I seem to feel my heart pound with joy even to this moment!" The text goes on to recount his mother's superstitious beliefs, which he himself had come to share. Following Smaranda's indication, Nică believed that blond-haired boys such as himself could invoke sunny weather by playing outside on a rainy day, that various dangers could be cursed away, and that marking the human body with soot or mud meant protection against the evil eye. The narrator also mentions his regret at not having shown his mother his full appreciation, and refers to childhood as "the merry age".

This introduction is followed by Creangă's rendition of interactions between his father, depicted as aloof and moody, but often amused by his boy's misbehaving, and his mother, who supervises the children directly and criticizes Ștefan for not following her lead. Indicating that he deserved the often severe punishments applied by his parents, the narrator then details his mischievousness and antics. He recounts his participation in the customs related to Saint Basil's feast (modern New Year's Day), fashioning a pig's bladder into a rattle and joining buhai players in celebrations as noisy as to irritate the settled villagers. The story also shows Nică greedily consuming all the milk his mother leaves out for souring and trying to blame it on the strigoi spirits, or bothering Chiorpec the shoemaker to the point where the aging man would punish him by covering his face in terpene. In summer, the boy plans a ruse to steal cherries from his uncle's property, and makes his way into the orchard by pretending to be looking for a cousin. Caught red-handed by his aunt and chased by her through a hemp plot, he manages to escape when she gets tangled in the plants.

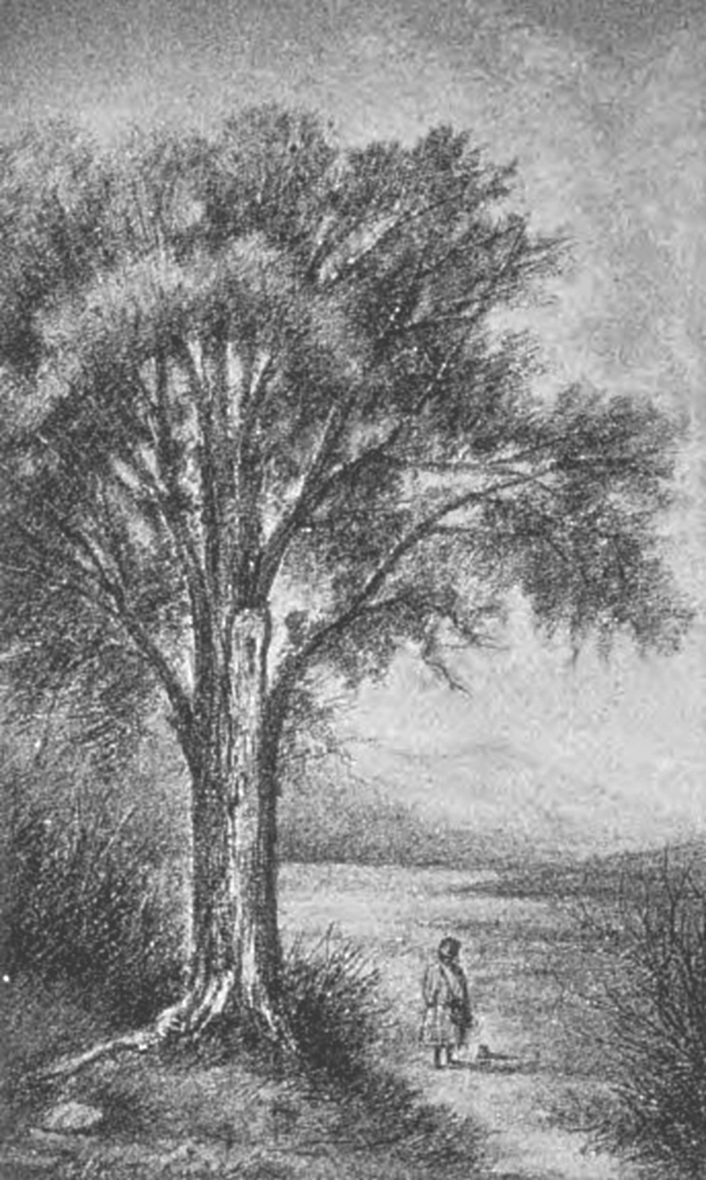
Nică decides to steal the hoopoe. 1892 illustration by Theodor Buiucliu

Another such episode details the boy's trip on the outskirts of the village, sent over to provide food for the Romani day laborers hired by Ștefan and Smaranda. This episode sees the boy's unsupervised encounter with the village hoopoe (or "Armenian cuckoo"). Miserable over having to wake up early every morning to the sound of the bird, Nică exercises his revenge by trapping the bird inside her nest, a time-consuming process which drives the awaiting and isolated laborers to despair. Met with much hostility by his father's employees when he ultimately reaches his destination, the boy makes his way back to the hoopoe's lime tree and easily ties up the exhausted bird, hiding her in the attic of his house, where it no longer can sing. His deed proves detrimental to the entire community, deprived of its alarm clock, and rumors quickly spread that Nică is responsible. While Smaranda decides whether she should trust these reports, the boy assesses that his best choice is to sell the hoopoe at the fair. He proceeds to do so, but his entire scheme crumbles once a sly old man, pretending to assess the bird, releases it from its bonds. As the bird flies back to her nest, Nică angrily demands reparation. He is instead ridiculed by the old man, who informs him that Ștefan is also attending the fair and might be interested in the conversation, thus exposing the boy and prompting him to rush out of the market in fear of more severe repercussion.

After a few paragraphs in which he focuses on the serendipitous nature of such outcomes, which serve him to avert producing further damage, Creangă moves on to describe his first employment: pulled out of school by Ștefan, the boy is enlisted in the village's textile trade, and becomes a spinner. It is there that he meets Măriuca, a daughter his age, for whom he develops a sympathy. She jokingly assigns him the nickname Ion Torcălău ("Ion the Spinster"), which causes him some embarrassment for being shared with a Romani man, and therefore crossing a traditional ethnic divide. Nică is shown to be enjoying the work despite the fact that it is traditionally performed by women, but he is irritated by additional tasks such as babysitting his youngest sibling. Disobeying his mother's word, the boy leaves the cradle unattended and runs away to bathe in the river. After recounting the superstitious rituals performed by children during such escapades (such as dripping water from one's years onto stones, of which one is God's and the other the Devil's), the narrator describes being caught in the act by Smaranda, who punishes him by taking hold of all his clothes and leaving him to return naked through the village. This he manages following an elaborate route, from one hiding place to another, and avoiding being bitten by angry dogs by standing absolutely still for a long interval. After reaching his house, the narrator indicates, "I tidied up and cleaned the house as well as any grown-up girl", a behavior earning praises from his mother. The chapter ends with another overview, itself concluded with the words: "I myself was placed on this Earth like a clay figure endowed with eyes, a handful of animated humus from Humulești, who's never been handsome before age twenty, wise before age thirty, nor rich before age forty. But neither was I ever as poor as I was this year, last year and throughout life!"

=== Third chapter ===
The first section of the book's third chapter follows up on the "handful of animated humus" metaphor, restructuring it as the point of departure for an imaginary dialogue the writer carries out with himself. It offers additional detail on the general history of Humulești, an account leading as far back as the Polish–Ottoman War of 1672–1676, and briefly mentioning the passage of Austrians on their quest to find the beautiful princess Natalia (events which the writer claims to have witnessed himself). This exposition leads the narrator to conclude that the place of his birth "do not live like a bear in its lair". His statement serves to introduce the next period in Nică's life: his reenlistment in school, which this time around is a new institution founded on the orders of Moldavian Prince Grigore Alexandru Ghica, and presided upon by theologian Isaia "Popa Duhu" Teodorescu. There follows a detailed rendition of Ghica's opening speech, as witnessed by Creangă himself. The story then focuses on Teodorescu, his methods for teaching arithmetic rules such as cross-multiplication, and his apparent despondency when faced with students such as Nică Oșlobanu (depicted as unruly and egotistic). This attitude leads to conflict between Teodorescu and parson Niculai Oșlobanu, the boy's father. Enhanced by a quarrel over theological and administrative matters, it culminates with Oșlobanu and his subordinate monks chasing Teodorescu out of their establishment.

The narrative then focuses on Creangă's time at the seminary (catechism school) in Fălticeni, where, to his confessed surprise, he reunites with Nică Oșlobanu. Creangă's entry into the school follows the discovery that all his close friends were moving out of Teodorescu's school and leaving him directly exposed to the teacher's severity. He ultimately persuades his father to bribe seminary teachers with gifts, noting that such presents could effectively spare a student from all learning effort. Parts of the text however insists on the teaching methods employed by the seminary, which involve learning by heart and chanting elements of Romanian grammar or entire works of commentary on the Bible, and lead the narrator to exclaim: "A terrible way to stultify the mind, God alone knows!" Living far from parental supervision and sharing a house with some of his colleagues and their landlord Pavel the cobbler, the young man pursues a bohemian lifestyle and is introduced to the drinking culture. The narrator sketches portraits of his friends, based on their defining abilities or moods: the old man Bodrângă, who entertains the group with flute songs; Oșlobanu, a man of the mountain, can lift and carry a cartload of logs on his back; the handsome David, whose early death is attributed by the writer to excessive effort in learning; the irreverent Mirăuță, who taunts Jewish businessmen with antisemitic poems, but spends little time on schoolwork; Trăsnea, who can only learn grammar by memorizing the entire textbook, and who is much upset by the recent replacement of Romanian Cyrillic in favor of a Latin alphabet; Zaharia "Gâtlan" Simionescu, a flatterer who can persuade adults to tolerate his daring gestures; Buliga, a priest given to drinking and merrymaking, who is depicted blessing the group's parties. The noisy men tour pubs in and outside the city, their escapades being marked by rudeness, womanizing and even shoplifting. The writer also makes vague mention of his relationship with the daughter of a priest, who becomes his first lover.

Creangă's account also focuses on practical jokes, used by him and others as punishment for friends he believed were not reciprocal in sharing their Christmas supplies. These involve "posts", contraptions which are designed to singe one's toes during sleep, and their application manages to alienate the victims, who leave the house on by one. However, the final such attempt produces a scuffle between the two camps, so loud that neighbors mistaken it for a fire or an attack by the Austrian troops stationed in Fălticeni (a military presence concomitant to the Crimean War and a Moldavian interregnum). This ends when all young men are evicted from the house, Creangă himself moving in with a local smith. In spring, it becomes apparent that the Fălticeni school is to be closed down, and its students moved to the Socola Monastery in Iași. The chapter ends with mention of the uncertainty gripping students: some decide to attempt their chances in Socola by the start of a new school year, while others abandon their career prospects.

=== Fourth chapter ===
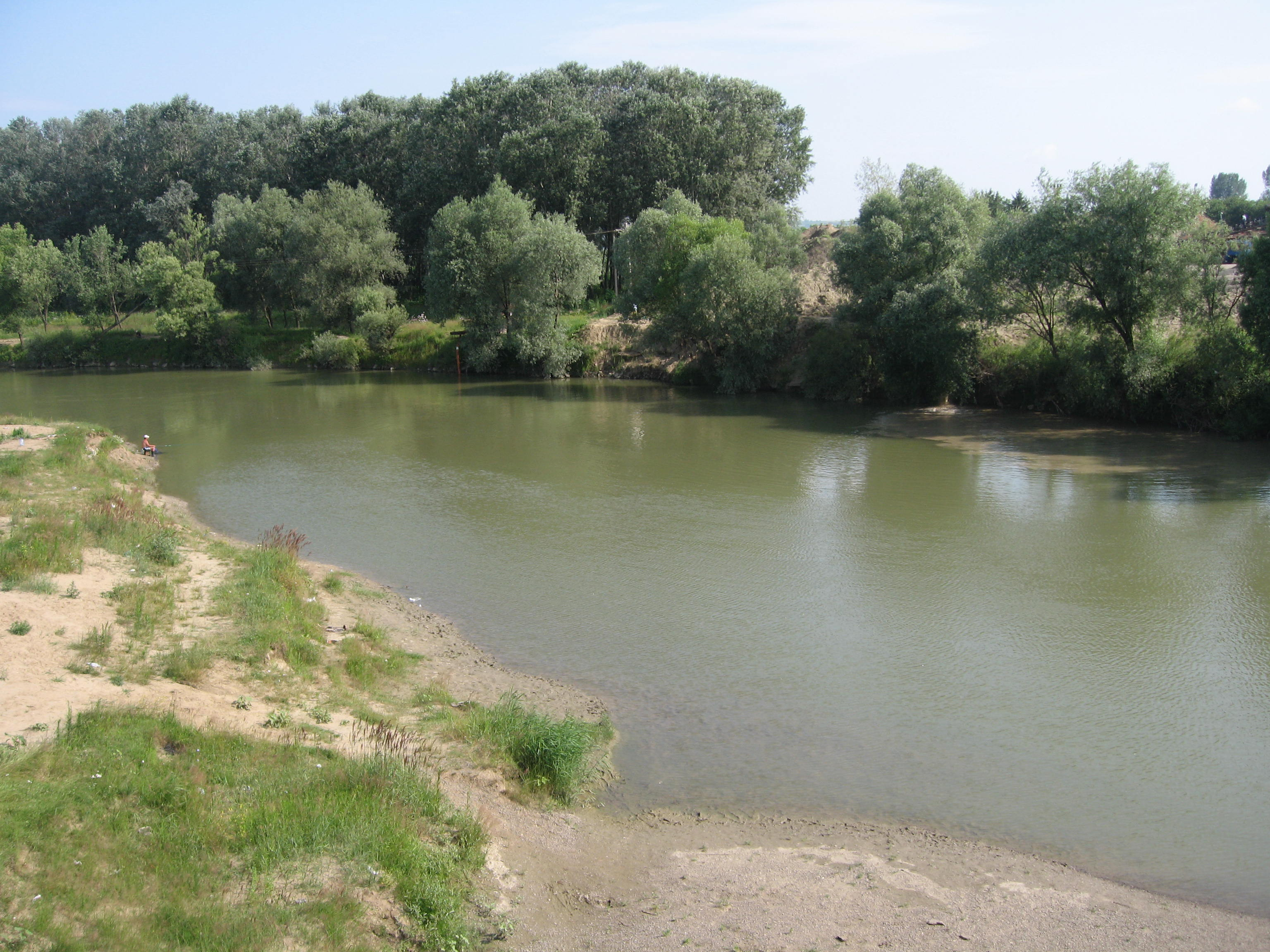
The Siret River, which runs across Moldavia

The fourth and final chapter of Childhood Memories opens with Creangă's depiction of his own doubts at having to leave Humulești for the more distant Iași: "A bear will not dance of its own accord." The narrator uses this as a pretext to describe the things most dear to him in Humulești: the landscape ("the smooth-flowing crystal-clear Ozana, wherein the Neamț Citadel has sadly been mirroring its face for so many centuries!"), his family and companions, and the local customs related to partying and dancing. His plans about staying home or becoming a monk are shattered by his mother Smaranda, who angrily invokes her ancestors' reputation in persuading him to leave for Socola and make a name for himself as a married priest.

The narrative focus then covers the trip from Humulești to the Moldavian capital: Creangă and Gâtlan are passengers in the horse-drawn wagon of Luca, their neighbor and family friend. The narrator recounts sense of his shame and frustration upon noticing that Luca's "steeds" are actually "weak and scraggy" horses, and the despondency which grips him and Zaharia in front of the unknown. This sentiment is enhanced by the remarks of passers-by, which refer to the poor state of Luca's belongings and gain in sarcasm as the three travelers approach their destination. The account includes the writer's impressions of the Moldavian landscape, and his stated preference for the mountainous landscape of the west, which the cart was leaving behind, to the areas over the Siret River (where, according to Luca, "the water's bad and wood is scarce; in summer you're smothered with heat and the mosquitoes are an awful torment"). The chapter and volume end abruptly with a description of students from all Moldavian schools gathering into the Socola Monastery yard.

== Publication history ==
Creangă's Childhood Memories are, with his portrait of Isaia Teodorescu (eponymously titled Popa Duhu), one of his memoirs, complementing his contributions in the fairy tale and anecdote. The four chapters were produced in several consecutive sessions of writing, separated by lengthy intervals, and were first published as distinct texts. The fourth part was left unfinished by the author's illness and eventual death. Each chapter was the product of an extensive work on the part of the author: by the time its first draft versions began circulating, the author was already known in the literary community for his laborious approach to the process of writing (as notably documented by the contemporary account of experimental psychologist Eduard Gruber). Creangă would at times read the individual texts, like his other writings, in front of a public constituted from the members of Junimea literary society (some of whom were Iacob Negruzzi, Vasile Pogor and Alexandru Lambrior).

The individual texts, including the posthumously published fourth section, were first hosted by various issues of the Junimea magazine Convorbiri Literare beginning 1881. The first chapter in its original fragmentary version and the subsequent Romanian versions of the whole book open with Creangă's words: Dedicație d-șoarei L. M. ("A dedication to Mrs. L. M."). This is a reference to Livia, daughter of Creangă's mentor and Junimea leader Titu Maiorescu, who probably copied and proofread his manuscript text. The last and incomplete section was probably written during 1889. This was at a time when Creangă was no longer affiliated with Junimea, and had ended his relationship with Maiorescu; the text was therefore read in front Nicolae Beldiceanu's literary club, a venue frequented by him and Gruber.

The entire text was first published in book form as a section of the incomplete Creangă reader, edited by Gruber, A. D. Xenopol and Grigore Alexandrescu in 1892 (upon the bequest of the writer's son Constantin). The second such edition was included in the first-ever complete edition of Creangă's work, published between 1902 and 1906 by folklorist Gheorghe T. Kirileanu.

The product of Creangă's work is noted for its relatively isolated linguistic context, often relying on obscure elements in the Romanian lexis by adopting colloquial, antiquated, Moldavian dialectal or specifically rural speech patterns. Such elements have made Childhood Memories a problematic book for translations into other languages. A Romanian-to-English topical comparison made by academic Anca Mureșan cautioned: "Creangă's local and popular language poses diverse and serious difficulties to a translator. Among the lexical problems, special mention should be made of Creangă's use of numerous terms related to rural life and system, to church service, superstition and so on."

== Structure, genre and style ==
=== Conventional aspects and subjective account ===
Much critical attention retrospectively focused on the measure of difference between, on one hand, the originality and subjectivity in Ion Creangă's first-person narrative and, on the other, their debt to the affixed conventions of traditional literary discourse. George Călinescu, the influential interwar critic and literary historian, argued that the writing appealed to traditional storytelling, lacking in individuality, and therefore dissimilar to "a confession or a diary." Instead, he believed, the Memories outline "the childhood of the universal child." Assessing that the book adapts the characteristics of oral tradition and frame narratives leading back to Renaissance literature, Călinescu also saw them mainly as a testing ground for the author's soliloquy and an illustration of his abilities as a raconteur. He argued: "The stories are true, but typical, without depth. Once retold with a different kind of gesticulation, the subject would lose all of its lively atmosphere." In contrast, Călinescu's contemporary and colleague Tudor Vianu argued: "The character in [Creangă's] stories, novellas and anecdotes recounts himself Childhood Memories, a work so not like folk narratives in its intent." In reference to the similarities between the text and the Renaissance tradition, Vianu also noted: "The idea of fictionalizing oneself, of outlining one's formative steps, the steady accumulation of impressions from life, and then the sentiment of time, of its irreversible flow, of regret for all things lost in its consumption, of the charm relived through one's recollections are all thoughts, feelings and attitudes defining a modern man of culture. No popular model could have ever stood before Creangă when he was writing his Memories, but, surely, neither could the cultured prototypes of the genre, the first autobiographies and memoirs of the Renaissance". According to his interpretation: "Here, as in his stories and novellas, Creangă effects the passage from the popular level of literature to its cultured level, following a strictly spontaneous path by organically developing a talent exercised throughout the past of an old rural culture, now reaching a point where it surpasses itself."

Such themes were also present in later critical commentary. In a 2000 article, essayist and novelist Norman Manea builds on Călinescu's conclusions to assert that the "stable", "serene" and "solar" narrator of Childhood Memories "does not even exist outside [his] unveiling of an enchanted, traditional, rigorous concreteness". Referring to a text by critic Mircea Moț, who found Childhood Memories to be "one of the saddest works in Romanian literature", literary chronicler and essayist Gheorghe Grigurcu himself assessed that the work evidenced "a tension between the individual as a holographic representative of the structure to whom he belongs and the written universe, intuitively a profane space, a vague imitation of the demiurgic act, and therefore a sacrilege." Writing in 2008, literary historian Nicolae Manolescu argued that the Memories volume evidenced "Creangă's genius", which was linked to "the naïve and carefree register of childhood", and therefore implicitly superior to all his other works in prose. The second part's opening (where the narrator refers to his childhood games, to his mother's pets, and to his household oven) has reputedly become one of the best known fragments in Romanian literature. Manea notes that, through this section of prose, Creangă managed to "perfectly" convey both the "spatial and timely positioning" of his account, "as well as all the details of an ingenuous and restless universe". He contrasts this perspective with another first-person fragment: the opening of Adventures in Immediate Unreality by the interwar novelist Max Blecher, which directly plunges the reader into a universe of modernist uncertainty, subjectivity and suffering.

Various commentators of the text have focused on the measure of difference between Creangă's account and the actual details of his biography, in particular life within Ștefan's family. According to George Călinescu, the Moldavian writer actually grew up in a single-parent household, raised only by his mother Smaranda, who may never have been legally married to Ștefan. Creangă's biographer Dan Grădinaru believes the narrative to reveal Nică as "a loner", and, using psychoanalytical terminology, sees the entire volume as proof of "dethronement complex" and an excessive focus on maternal love. Such approaches have received negative comments from critic Luminița Marcu, who discussed Călinescu's "deformity" of interpreting writers through their work, without separating contexts, and judged Grădinaru's comments as proof a "mania of Freudianisms."

=== Historical record ===
Creangă's portrayal of the childhood universe as a timeless reality, like his emphasis on tradition, relate to the characteristics of his native village and surrounding region. In Norman Manea's view, the "perfectly recognizable" narrative setting points to "repetitive cycles". Focusing on the description of Humulești found in the opening lines, historian Neagu Djuvara commented: "even if we take into account that the grown-up will embellish, transfigure, 'enrich' the memories of his childhood, how could we not recognize the sincerity in Creangă's heart-warming evocation of his childhood's village?" Djuvara used the fragment to discuss the structure of Romanian rural society in Moldavia, made relatively wealthy by textile enterprises, in comparison to its counterpart in the southern region of Wallachia, concluding: "if the mud hut villages of the Danube flood plain are to be taken into account, one finds himself in a different country." Folklorist and critic Marcu Berza took the book as a record of Romanian folklore, its varieties and its reception, noting that the episode in which buhai players are chased away by angered householders shows that some peasants preferred a quieter celebration to what was in effect an echo of pagan fertility rites.

A topic of interest for critic Muguraș Constantinescu was the regulatory status of old men and women within a Moldavian community in the context of social change, as disclosed by the Childhood Memories text. She describes David Creangă as a "clan leader" and "enlightened man", guided by "the wisdom and balance of the ripe age", who, although illiterate, is able to understand the value of providing his grandson with a formal education. According to Constantinescu: "[David's] common sense is also apparent in the field of religious belief, where, as any good Christian in a Romanian village of the mid 19th century, he takes mass and behaves like a practicing Christian, but does not encourage his wife's bigotry." The unnamed old man who cheats Nică out of his hoopoe, Constantinescu writes, is a figure among those who educate young Creangă by resorting to "farce" instead of a stern lesson in morals. Other figures she considers relevant for this analysis are Chiorpec the shoemaker, Bodrângă the performer and the various old women who function as healers.

Ion Creangă's depiction of seminary life and teaching methods has also been linked by literary critics with the larger aspects of his personal worldview. Z. Ornea finds the narrator's outbursts against the practice of learning by heart to innovative choices Creangă made in his own career as an educator, and especially his support for Titu Maiorescu's theories on reforming the local curriculum through institutional modernization and professionalization. Himself a writer, Horia Gârbea discussed the text as proof of anticlericalism on the part of Creangă (whose career in the clergy was to end in defrocking), adding: "Creangă's Memories of the catechist school would discourage any candidate."

== Tributes and influence ==
Childhood Memories first became a source for inspiration for various Romanian authors during the early 20th century and the interwar period. It was imitated by I. Dragoslav in his own 1909 work, Povestea copilăriei ("The Tale of Childhood")—called "a disgraceful pastiche" by Călinescu. The same critic also discussed the Romanian theater adaptation a Childhood Memories chapter by writer I. I. Mironescu, as Catiheții de la Humulești ("The Catechists from Humulești")—deeming it "superfluous" to Creangă's already "dramatic" text. Nicolae Manolescu identified an additional product of Creangă's influence as a memoirist in Copilăria unui netrebnic ("The Childhood of a Ne'er-do-well"), a 1936 novel by the avant-garde author Ion Călugăru.

More interest in the text came later in the century, during Romania's communist period. A number of new editions of the book saw print at the time, including ones published by the new and eponymous state-run publishing house, Editura Ion Creangă. Some of these were leading Romanian graphic artists: a 1959 volume with 14 drawings by Eugen Taru (the originals of which form a permanent exhibit at Creangă's memorial house in Humulești) and another one with plates by Lívia Rusz, in both black-and-white and color. It was also then that the text came to inspire Romanian films by Elisabeta Bostan: the 1964 Amintiri din copilărie (with child actor Ion Bocancea as Nică and Ștefan Ciubotărașu as the grown-up narrator) and Pupăza din tei (based on the hoopoe episode).

Echoes of the book were also found in Romania's neighbor, Moldova (within historical Moldavia's Bessarabia subregion, and formerly part of the Soviet Union as the Moldavian SSR). Creangă's work in general and his memoirs in particular have influenced Moldovan Postmodernist novelist Leo Butnaru in writing Copil la ruși ("A Child to the Russians"), which is set to the backdrop of 1950s' Russification in the Moldavian SSR.
