= Dumitru Almaș =

Romanian journalist, novelist, historian, writer and professor

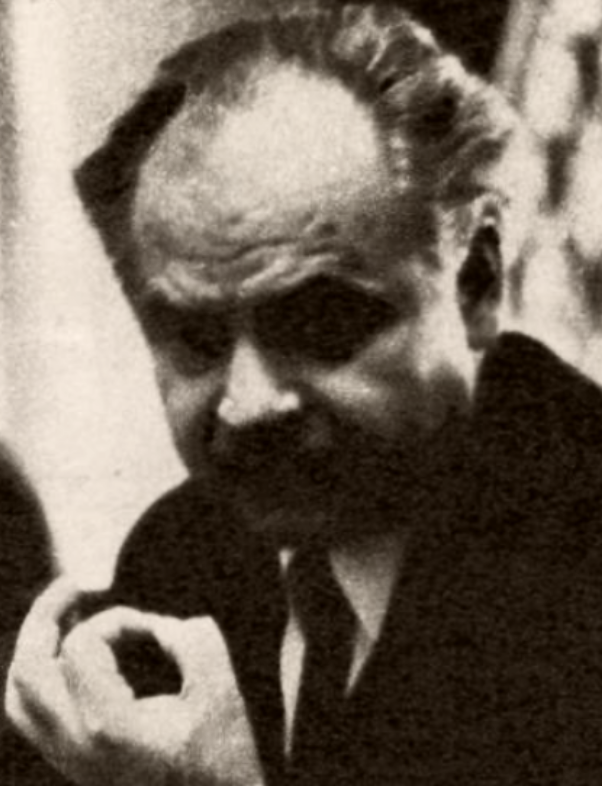
Almaș in March 1969

Dumitru Almaș (Romanian pronunciation: [duˈmitru alˈmaʃ]; pen name of Dumitru Ailincăi [ˌa.iˈliŋkəj]; October 19, 1908 – March 12, 1995) was a Romanian journalist, novelist, historian, writer and professor. His prolific output included children's literature, historical novels and textbooks. He was honored by both the Romanian Writers' Society and the subsequent Writers' Union of Romania. He also served as a member of the board of Society for Historical Sciences of Romania.

== Biography ==
Dumitru Almaș (pseudonym of Dumitru Ailincăi) was born in 1908 to Ion and Mariei Ailincăi (née Cojocaru) in Negrești, Neamț County. He attended Petru Rareș High School and graduated in 1928. In 1933, he obtained multiple degrees, from the University of Bucharest for philosophy, history, and geography.

Almaș served as a professor at the high schools in Siliștea and Călărași from 1938 to 1939 and then returned to his alma mater, the Petru Rareș High School in Piatra Neamț, where he taught from 1943 to 1949. During this time frame, he also was elected and served as a member of Parliament, for the National People's Party.

In 1949, he was hired as an associate professor for the Faculty of History at the University of Bucharest. He completed his doctorate with a thesis on the History of Voltaire and was made a full professor in 1972. He left the University of Bucharest in 1975, but continued working as a consultant for them. In 1985, he joined with the Ioan I. Dalles Popular University and taught history there until 1993. Simultaneously, he began teaching history at Spiru Haret University in 1990.

He wrote romanticized historical novels as well as textbooks. The literary magazine Observator Cultural listed Almaș as one of the leading writers of children's literature in Romania, among others such as Călin Gruia, Gica Iuteș, Octav Pancu-Iași, Mircea Sântimbreanu and Ovidiu Zotta.

He was the editor of the magazines Zorile (1935–1937) and Lumea românească (1937–1938). He also wrote articles for and collaborated with Contemporanul, Albina, Magazin, Familia, Argeș, Ateneu, Iașul nou, and Veac nou. In the 1940s during World War II, he was the editor of Revista Santinela, the magazine of the Romanian Army. In 1967, he founded Magazin Istoric and served as its editor-in-chief until 1969.

He was a member of the board of Society for Historical Sciences of Romania. In 1942, he was honored by the Romanian Writers' Society and by its successor, the Writers' Union of Romania, in 1954.

Almaș died in 1995 in Bucharest.

== Legacy ==
Almaș was the most prolific author from Neamț County, writing over 70 books, dozens of screen and radio plays, and over 5,000 articles. In 2000, all of his books and manuscripts were donated by his daughter to the GT Kirileanu Library of Neamț County to preserve them and allow them to be available to researchers and the public.

== Selected works ==
- Miron Costin, Editura Națională-Ciornei: Bucharest (1939) (in Romanian)
- Meșterul Manole. Editura Națională Gh. Mecu: Bucharest (1940) (in Romanian)
- Acolo, în Filioara Editura Națională Gh. Mecu: Bucharest (1943) (in Romanian)
- Ne chiamă primăvara, Editura Națională Gh. Mecu: Bucharest (1946) (in Romanian)
- Neculai Milescu-Spătarul, Editura Tineretului: Bucharest (1954) (in Romanian)
- Alei, codrule fârtate, Editura Tineretului: Bucharest (1956) (in Romanian)
- Făclia s-a aprins, Editura de Stat pentru literatură și artă: Bucharest (1957) (in Romanian)
- Freamătul luminii, Editura Tineretului: Bucharest (1958) (in Romanian)
- Cetatea de pe stânca verde (1959), Editura Tineretului: Bucharest (in Romanian)
- Căderea Bastiliei: Revoluția burgheză din Franța 1789–1794, foreword by Mihai Ralea, Editura Tineretului: Bucharest (1959) (in Romanian)
- Nicolae Bălcescu – revoluționar, Editura Științifică: Bucharest (1959) (in Romanian)
- Bălcescu, a forradalmár, Tudomány és Kultúraterjesztő Társásag: Bucharest (1960) (in Hungarian)
- Bălcescu, democrat-revoluționar, Second revised edition, Editura Științifică: Bucharest (1962) (in Romanian)
- Fluierașul și alămâia, Editura Tineretului: Bucharest (1962) (in Romanian)
- Trandafirul roșu, Editura Tineretului: Bucharest (1963) (in Romanian)
- Vânătoarea lui Dragoș, Editura Tineretului: Bucharest (1963) (in Romanian)
- Un om în furtună, Editura Tineretului: Bucharest (1965) (in Romanian)
- Nord contra Sud. Războiul civil din Statele Unite ale Americii (1861–1865), Editura Științifică: Bucharest (1965) (in Romanian)
- Fata de la Cozia, Editura Tineretului: Bucharest (1965) (in Romanian)
- Mihai Vodă Viteazul, Editura Științifică: Bucharest (1966) (in Romanian)
- (coauthors: George Buzău and Aron Petric) Istoria Romîniei: manual pentru clasa a VII-a, Editura de Stat Didactică și Pedagogică: Bucharest (1966) (in Romanian)
- (coauthors: George Buzău and Aron Petric) Istoria României : manual pentru clasa a VIII-a, Editura de Stat Didactică și Pedagogică: Bucharest (1966) (in Romanian)
- (coauthors: George Buzău and Aron Petric) Istoria României : manual pentru clasa a XI-a, Editura de Stat Didactică și Pedagogică: Bucharest (1966) (in Romanian)
- Vitéz Mihály vajda, Tudományos Könyvkiadó: Bucharest (1967) (in Hungarian)
- Michael der Tapfere, Wissenschaftlicher Verlag: Bucharest (1967) (in German)
- Viața-i frumoasă, băieți!, Editura Pentru Literatură: Bucharest (1968) (in Romanian)
- Petru Voievod Rareș, Editura Meridiane: Bucharest (1970) (in Romanian)
- Diamantul negru, Editura Militară: Bucharest (1971) (in Romanian)
- Frații Buzești, Editura Eminescu: Bucharest (1971) (in Romanian)
- Decebal, eroul strămoșilor, strămoșul eroilor, Editura Meridiane: Bucharest (1972) (in Romanian)
- Miron Costin: cronicarul, Editura Meridiane: Bucharest (1973) (in Romanian)
- Curtea veche din București, Editura pentru turism: Bucharest (1974) (in Romanian)
- Frații Buzești. Vol. 2, Luceafărul a răsărit, Editura Eminescu: Bucharest (1975) (in Romanian)
- Eroi au fost, eroi sunt încă, Editura Politică: Bucharest (1975) (in Romanian)
- Comoara Brâncovenilor: roman istoric, Editura Militară: Bucharest (1977) (in Romanian)
- Cheia inimii, Editura Cartea Românească: Bucharest (1977) (in Romanian)
- Frații Buzești. Vol. 3, Zborul a rămas, Editura Eminescu: Bucharest (1977) (in Romanian)
- Vestea cea mare, Editura Ion Creangă: Bucharest (1978) (in Romanian)
- Drum de luptă și de glorie: pagini închinate independenței Editura Politică: Bucharest (1978) (in Romanian)
- Decebal și Traian: doi strămoși iluștri, Editura Ion Creangă: Bucharest (1980) (in Romanian)
- Inorogul cel înțelept, evocare istorică în douăsprezece episoade a vieții lui Dimitrie Cantemir, Editura Militară: Bucharest (1981) (in Romanian)
- Popasuri la vetrele istoriei românești, Editura Didactică și Pedagogică: Bucharest (1981) (in Romanian)
- Povestiri istorice Editura Didactică și Pedagogică: Bucharest (1982) (in Romanian)
- Voievodul fără teamă și fără prihană : roman istoric Editura Albatros: Bucharest (1984) (in Romanian)
- Oana: roman Editura Militară: Bucharest (1986) (in Romanian)
- Român Grue Grozovanu Editura Ion Creangă: Bucharest (1987) (in Romanian)
- Vetre de istorie românească Editura Sport Turism: Bucharest (1988) (in Romanian)
- Arcașul Măriei Sale Editura Vizual: Bucharest (1996) (in Romanian)
