= Vertiujeni =

- Village
- Location within Moldova
- Coordinates: 48°00′N 28°32′E
- Country: Moldova
- District: Florești District

Government
  - Mayor: ION SCOARTA (PDCM)

Population (2024 census)
  - Total: 1,609
- Time zone: UTC+2 (EET)
  - Summer (DST): UTC+3 (EEST)
- Postal code: MD-6653

Vertiujeni is a village in Florești District, Moldova.

== See also ==
- Alexandru Mironov
