= Călin Gruia =

Romanian writer (1915–1989)

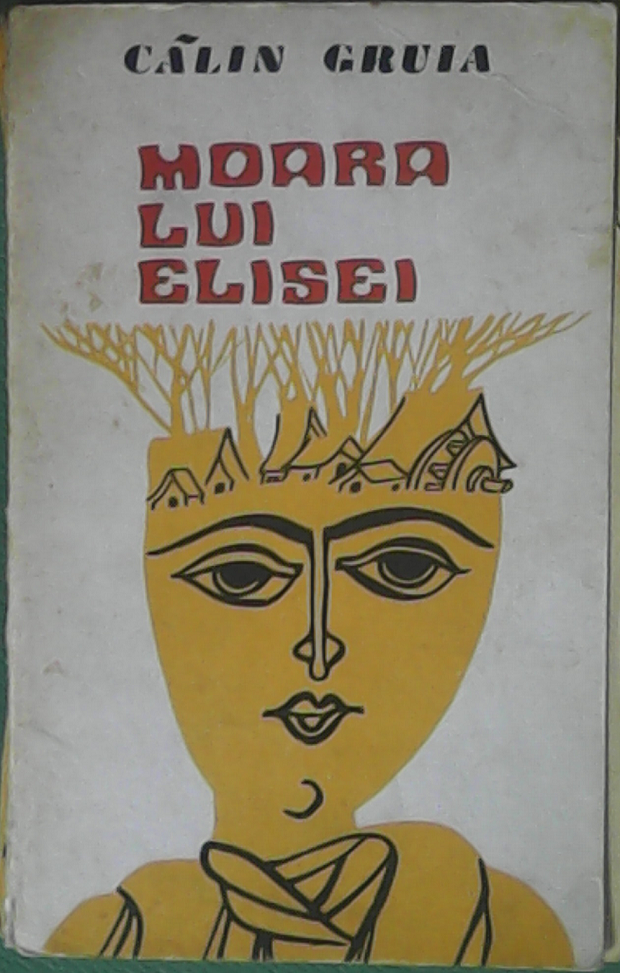
Moara lui Elisei

Călin Gruia (Romanian pronunciation: [kəˈlin ˈɡruja]; born Chiril Gurduz [kiˈril ɡurˈduz]; March 21, 1915 – July 9, 1989) was a Romanian writer, author mainly of children's fairy tales and poems.

Born in Trifești, Orhei County, in the Bessarabia Governorate of the Russian Empire, from 1918 to 1940 a part of Greater Romania and today in Moldova, his parents were the peasants Vartolomeu and Alexandrina (née Galbură). He graduated from the normal school in Orhei in 1936 and from the reserve officers' school the following year. Between 1937 and 1939, he was a teacher in Tvardița, Tighina County, and in Umbrărești, Tecuci County. He performed his military service in 1939–1940, fought on the Eastern Front of World War II from 1940 to 1944 and was one of the Romanian prisoners of war in the Soviet Union from 1944 to 1948. Between 1951 and 1969, he edited the children's programs at Radioteleviziunea Română. He was one of the creators of the show and wrote over 50 radio scripts for it. In 1958, the program changed from a radio format to a television format and had been continuously running for 50 years in 2007.

Among the magazines for which he wrote were Roza and Basarabia literară from Chișinău, Cutezătorii, Luminița and Arici Pogonici. His poetic and prose debut came in 1938, in Orhei's Speranța. His first published work was a small 1942 volume of poetry, Litanii de seară, followed a decade later by the selection of stories Nucul lui Toderiță. Further publications included stories and legends, several novels and books of stories for adults. In 1980, he published the poems he wrote between 1940 and 1970, republishing part of them in 1988. He also wrote for history-themed films. Part of his output was translated into a number of languages. The literary magazine Observator Cultural listed Gruia as one of the leading writers of children's literature in Romania, among others such as Dumitru Almaș, Gica Iuteș, Octav Pancu-Iași, Mircea Sântimbreanu, and Ovidiu Zotta. In 2012, his works were still being presented at children's theater performances.

== Published works ==
- Litanii de seară (1942)
- Nucul lui Toderiță (1952)
- Nuielușa de alun (1954)
- Ciuboțelele ogarului (1954)
- Poveste mică pentru cei mici (1954)
- Povestea lăcrămioarelor (1955)
- Profesorul cel nou (1955)
- Izvorul fermecat (1956)
- Minunata-mpărăție cu palate de hârtie (1957)
- La 'Drumurile lumii' (1959)
- Poiana lunii (1960)
- Onică (1962)
- Vineri la amiază (1962)
- Drumul spune povești (1963)
- Di-Di-Ri (1964)
- Ograda (1965)
- De-a visele... (1966)
- Ospățul (1966)
- Povești (1967)
- Jucăușul (1967)
- Domnița de rouă (1969)
- Vântură-lume (1970)
- Măriuca (1970)
- Cu ochii ca iarba... (1972)
- Acolo colinele ard... (1974)
- Ramura de măr înflorit (1974)
- Peretele de lut (1975)
- Scrisori pentru fluturi și pietre (1976)
- Prințul de hârtie (1977)
- Prietena mea, Cateluța (1979)
- Moara lui Elisei (1980)
- În norii ce vin și se duc (1980)
- La valsul dimineții (1981)
- Poiana de argint (1982)
- Pânzele mamei (1984)
- Nălucile nopții (1985)
- Călătorii (1988)
- The Hound Boots (1995)
- Izvorul fermecat (1997)
- Fata cu părul de aur (1998)
