= Eugen Taru =

Romanian graphic artist

Eugen Taru (Romanian pronunciation: [e.uˈdʒen ˈtaru]; 1913 – 1991) was a Romanian graphic artist, best known for his work in the political cartoon, caricature, comic strip, and book illustration genres. Active throughout the communist period and first acknowledged as one among the young socialist realists promoted by the regime, Taru primarily associated with satirical magazines such as Urzica.

Recognized early on for his controversial involvement with the propaganda apparatus, he later focused on his work for children, and became one of the noted visual artists employed by the Editura Ion Creangă publishing house. Also known as art collectors, he and his wife Josefina donated one of the principal estates exhibited by the Museum of Art Collections. His own works are featured in several Romanian museums.

== Biography ==
Born in Craiova, Taru graduated from the city's Carol I High School. He first became noted as an artist in the years after World War II, when he affiliated with the communists and socialist realists who received official endorsement from the Romanian Communist Party. Art critic Pavel Șușară cited his name among young artists who needed affirmation and found it through political compromise, the "hardcore" group "who illustrated, through their attitudes, their iconography and implicit philosophy, the benchmarks, the aspirations and the utopias of a system that had an imperative need for artists to promote its doctrine and provide it with symbolic credentials."

In the context of the Cold War, Taru became especially known for stereotypical political cartoons, such as those targeting Wall Street business or wealthy peasants known as chiaburi (the equivalent of kulaks). The latter were especially controversial, since they coincided with the forced collectivization and the murderous campaign targeting the rural elites. One of Taru's watercolors, called Demascarea chiaburului ("Unmasking the Chiabur"), shows a proletarian, a communized peasant and a militiaman publicly shaming the rich peasant for not handing in his production quota (which, in reality, was set to a preferential and debilitating level). After the Tito–Stalin split, when Soviet-aligned Romania pursued a propaganda war on the Socialist Federal Republic of Yugoslavia, the artist was enlisted to produce giant panels showing Josip Broz Tito as a butcher holding a bloody axe (in the line of posters deeming him a "butcher of the Yugoslav peoples").

During the 1950s, Taru also created a regularly published comic strip, built around and named after its main character, the dwarf Barbăcot. The decade coincided with a slump in the history of Romanian comics: while exercising ideological control over the comic strip scene, the authorities reputedly preferred to invest in animation, viewed as a more effective means of spreading propaganda. In this context, Taru's survived as one of the comic strips most familiar to the general public during communism (alongside those created by Ion Deak, Pompiliu Dumitrescu, Puiu Manu, Vintilă Mihăescu, Dumitru Negrea, Ion Popescu-Gopo, and Lívia Rusz).

Taru was still working at Urzica after 1965, when the regime changed cultural direction under new leader Nicolae Ceaușescu. According to artist Mihai Pînzaru-Pim, who began working for the magazine in 1969, Taru, alongside Cik Damadian and actor Horațiu Mălăele, discreetly stood against the policies enforced by Ceaușescu, defined by him as "the stupid attempt to induce ideology on a wise people". Pînzaru-Pim contends that, as a result, Urzica was among the publications most likely to bypass communist censorship with șopârle (lit. "lizards", or pieces subtly criticizing the regime in a seemingly innocent context). Together, Taru and Pînzaru-Pim were also the first Romanian cartoonists to receive international awards. One of Taru's cartoons, "mocking the youth for their slavish imitation of Western culture", was highlighted in a secret CIA report from 1970.

An area where Taru's contribution has traditionally been seen as superlative was that of book illustration. According to his entry at the National Museum of Art, Taru was one of the local artists "who consolidated the prestige of book illustration as an autonomous genre, enriching the concept of 'illustration' with more complex functions than the mere visualization of a literary sequence or a poetic state." Recalling her introduction to the genre as a child, graphic artist Arina Stoenescu lists Taru, alongside Rusz and Val Munteanu, as one of three most memorable artists to have been associated with the state-run children's book publisher Editura Ion Creangă. Among the noted drawings produced by Taru in this area were his 14 pieces for a 1959 edition of Childhood Memories by the 19th century Romanian literature classic Ion Creangă, and his illustrations for a 1986 translation of Miguel de Cervantes' Don Quixote (the second Romanian edition of the book to feature original illustrations, after the 1976 version by Val Munteanu).

== Estate ==
Taru and his wife Josefina gathered a sizable collection of artistic works, which, together with some of Taru's own creations, was donated to the Museum of Art Collections. This estate includes the works of Romanian masters (Ion Andreescu, Alexandru Ciucurencu, Dumitru Ghiață, Lucian Grigorescu, Iosif Iser, Ștefan Luchian, Theodor Pallady, Gheorghe Petrașcu, Nicolae Tonitza, Francisc Șirato) and local painters in whom Taru invested (Ștefan Constantinescu, Ion Pacea), alongside old samples of Romanian and Russian icons. Other parts of the collection include Oriental art (Chinese and Japanese porcelain, cloisonné-decorated bronze vessels, a painting in the style of Hanabusa Itchō), as well as European decorative items (such as 18th century French furniture).

Eugen Taru's drawings for Childhood Memories are preserved by the Creangă Memorial House in Târgu Neamț, as an integral part of the permanent exhibit. Demascarea chiaburului is held at the Bánffy Palace Art Museum in Cluj-Napoca.

== Exhibitions ==
- 2015 From Political Propaganda to Baby Boom – PostModernism Museum, Bucharest
- 1983 Bucharest – retrospective exhibition
- 1966 Baia Mare, Târgu Mureș
- 1965 Brăila, Galați
- 1963 Bucharest, Eforie Nord, Leningrad, Kiev

Starting with 1949, he was participating at yearly state exhibitions, and since 1968 at Humorous Salons. He participated in all important international illustrated book salons (Moscow, Leipzig, Bratislava, Bologna) and cartoon salons (Bordighera, Tolentino, Gabrovo, Akşehir, Skopje, Moscow, Marostice, Knokke-Heist, Marostica, Montreal, Athens).
