= Alexandru Mironov =

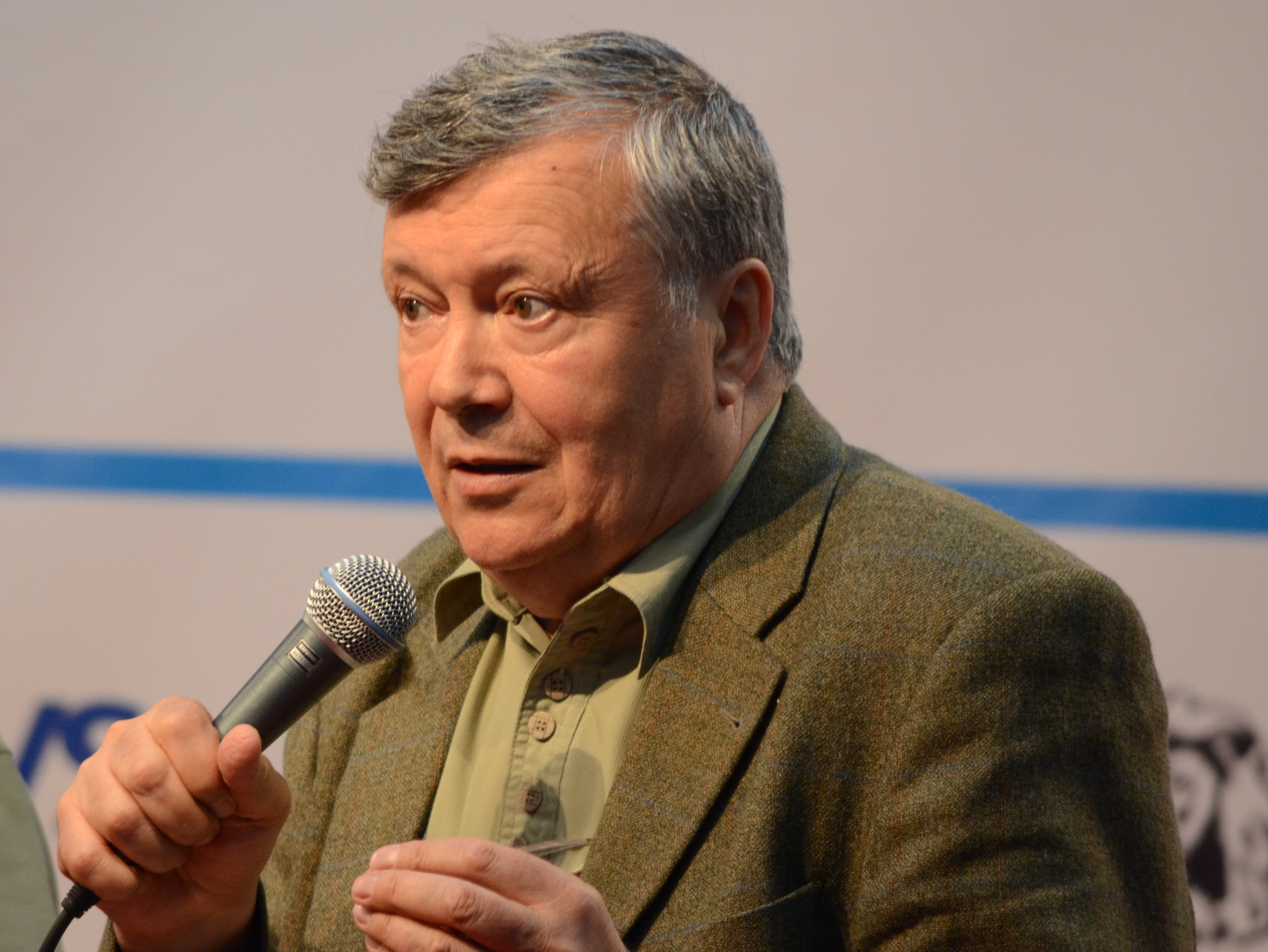
- Born: January 27, 1942 (age 84); Vertiujeni, Florești, Bessarabia, Romania
- Occupations: science-fiction writer, short story writer, literary critic, journalist, politician
- Writing career
- Genre: science fiction

Alexandru Mironov (born 27 January 1942) is a Romanian science-fiction writer, journalist, and left-wing politician. A former member of the Social Democratic Party (PSD) and Counsel for President Ion Iliescu, Mironov was Minister for Youth and Sport in 1993-1996. Since 2008, he is a member of the minor Romanian Socialist Party (PSR). He is also known as a radio and television presenter and a documentary filmmaker.

== Biography ==
Born in the Bessarabian locality of Vertiujeni, now part of Moldova, Mironov was from a family which took refuge in southern Romania following the region's second occupation by the Soviet Union before the end of World War II. He attended the Nicolae Bălcescu High School in Craiova (known before and after as the Carol I High School) and then he studied Mathematics at the University of Bucharest.

His debut was in 1971 in the number 387 of the Colecția de Povestiri Științifico-Fantastice magazine, having published two sci-fi stories Performanță ciudată(Strange performance) and Prea târziu(Too late). For the following decades, he published several dozens of stories, most of them featured in the Întâmplări din Veacul XXI (1974) and Alte întâmplări din Veacul XXI (1977) anthologies. Between 1969 and 1976, he traveled to various "paleoastronautics" sites studying the hypothesis that intelligent extraterrestrials have visited Earth in the past, this resulting in the book Enigmatic, pămîntul, published in 1977.

In 1979, Mironov joined the state-owned Romanian Television and Romanian Radio, which were then under a single administration. He was employed there until 1991, and again between 1996 and 2001 (when he worked for the main television station, TVR 1). According to Mironov's own statement, the communist regime sidelined him and sent him to work for the Radio company after his explicit refusal to broadcast praises of President Nicolae Ceaușescu.

He directed and produced several documentary films, including the 1984 Din soare, gheață și căldură (for which he received a prize granted by the Italian magazine Italia sul Mare), and the 1992 Universul cunoașterii (awarded the Annual Prize of the Association of Romanian Television Professionals). In all, Mironov produced around 2,000 broadcasts for the national television and radio stations. His successive shows were also granted prizes from various cultural institutions.

Alexandru Mironov played an active part in the anti-communist Romanian Revolution of 1989, when opened the first free Romanian Radio broadcast (22 December 1989). According to his own statements, he persuaded the Romanian Army soldiers not to storm into the main Radio building in Bucharest.

Following the fall of communism and until his resignation in 2005, he was a member of the National Salvation Front and of its successor party, the PSD (which went through various names). He also worked as a Counsel for Romanian President Ion Iliescu, and claims to have played a part in ensuring his election victory during the 1992 suffrage. Between 28 August 1993 and 11 December 1996, he was the Minister for Youth and Sport in the Nicolae Văcăroiu cabinet. While in office, Mironov inaugurated a state program which allowed some 13,000 honored students to visit foreign countries. Starting December 2004, he was named the head of the Institute of the Romanian Revolution.

Mironov left the PSD at the same time as his colleague Petre Lificiu, and motivated it by saying that Romania needed a real left-wing party. Alleging that the "almost all [PSD] leaders are millionaires in dollars", Mironov stated that he still supported former PSD leader Iliescu, showing himself ready to join a potential new left-wing party founded by the latter.

Mironov joined the relatively new PSR, created and led by Valentin Adem. In February 2008, Adem declared to the press that Mironov had been proposed as the PSR's new president, its main candidate in the scheduled legislative election, as well as contender for the office of Mayor of Bucharest.

== Published books ==
- Enigmatic, pămîntul (Scrisul Românesc, Bucharest, 1977; second edition, Editura InterContempPress, Bucharest, 1997)
- Proiecte planetare (Editura Albatros, Bucharest, 1988; ed. a II-a, Editura pentru Știință SIT, Bucharest, 2006) - with Alexandru A. Boiu
- Întîmplări din mileniul III (Editura Ion Creangă, Bucharest, 1989)
- Cronici metagalactice (Editura Tehnică, Bucharest, 1990) - with Ștefan Ghidoveanu
- Cronici microelectronice (Editura Tehnică, Bucharest, 1990) - with Ștefan Ghidoveanu and Mihai Bădescu
- Laboratoarele lumii de mîine (Editis, Bucharest, 1992)
- În direct cu NASA (Editura pentru Știință SIT, Bucharest, 2006)
- Lumea-după-Google (Editura Nemira, Bucharest, 2013)
