= Liviu Radu =

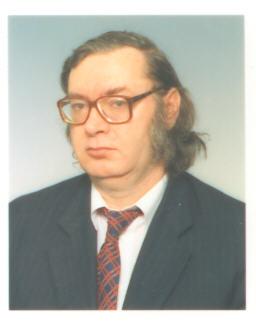
- Born: November 20, 1948; Bucharest, Romanian People's Republic
- Died: 17 October 2015 (aged 66); Bucharest, Romania
- Education: Politehnica University of Bucharest
- Occupations: science-fiction writer, novelist, short story writer
- Writing career
- Genre: science fiction

Liviu Radu (20 November 1948 – 17 October 2015) was a Romanian science-fiction writer and translator.

== Early days ==
Born in Bucharest, he graduated in 1971 from the Politehnica University of Bucharest.

== Work ==
=== Novels ===
- Trip-Tic (1999)
- Opțiunea (2004)
- Spaime (2004, republished in 2014)
- Waldemar series
  - Waldemar (2007)
  - Blocul câș (2008);
  - O după-amiază cu bere și zâne (2009)
  - Vânzoleli nocturne (2012)
  - Lumea lui Waldemar (2010, omnibus)
- Modificatorii (2010)
- Chestionar pentru doamne care au fost secretarele unor bărbați foarte cumsecade (2011)
- Taravik series
  - Armata moliilor (2012)
  - La galop prin piramida (2013)
  - Înfruntarea nemuritorilor (2014)

=== Collections ===
- Spre Ierusalim (2000)
- Constanța 1919 (2000)
- Babl (2004)
- Cifrele sunt reci, numerele-s calde (2006)
- Povestiri fantastice (2008)
- Ghicit de seară. 77 povești foarte scurte (2010)
- Singur pe Ormuza (2011)
- Golem, Golem și alte povestiri fantastice (2014)
- Între cer și pământ (2015)

=== Short stories ===
- Spre Ierusalim (2000)
- Constanța 1919 (2000)
- Babel (2004)
- Cifrele sunt reci, numerele-s calde (2006). Translated in English as Digits Are Cold, Numbers Are Warm (2012)
- Povestiri fantastice (2008)
- Ghicit de seară (2010)
- Singur pe Ormuza (2011). Translated in English as Alone on Ormuza (2012).
- Golem, golem (2014)
- Între cer și pământ (2015)

== See also ==
- List of Romanian science fiction writers
