= Mircea Sântimbreanu =

Romanian writer, journalist, screenwriter and film producer

Mircea Sântimbreanu (January 7, 1926 – August 19, 1999) was a Romanian writer, journalist, screenwriter and film producer. Sântimbreanu was the director of the publishing house Albatros, and is best remembered as a writer of children's literature. The literary magazine Observator Cultural listed Sântimbreanu as one of the leading writers of children's literature in Romania, among others such as Dumitru Almaș, Călin Gruia, Gica Iuteș, Octav Pancu-Iași, and Ovidiu Zotta.

== Selected works ==
- Cu și fără ghiozdan (1956),
- Extemporale și... alte lucrări scrise (1963),
- Lângă groapa cu furnici (1964),
- Recreația mare (1965), reeditare Editura Herra, 2009
- 32 de premianți (1980)
- Să stăm de vorbă fără catalog (1980)
- Mama mamuților mahmuri (1980)
- Pescuitul de la A la Z – ghidul pescarului sportiv, Editura Venus, 1995
- Să stăm de vorbă fără catalog, Editura Herra, 2009
