= Dan Duțescu =

Romanian academic

Dan Duțescu (21 October 1918 – 26 September 1992) was a professor of English language and literature at the University of Bucharest, and a member of the Romanian Writers' Union.

A graduate of the School of English Studies of the University of Bucharest's Department of Letters, he taught Romanian at the University of London (1964–1965) and the University of Cambridge (1971–1973).

He had a daughter, Taina Duțescu-Coliban, a linguist and mountain climber who went missing in 1992 while trying to climb Mount Dhaulaghiri.

== Works ==
=== Published books (selection) ===
- Limba engleză fără profesor ("Teach Yourself English"), co-author (with Leon Levițchi)
- Humour in English (Editura Științifică, 1964)
- Manual de conversație în limba engleză (ed. I - Editura Ştiinţifică, 1970; ed. II - 1973; ed. III - 1976)
- Spoken English - Manual de conversație în limba engleză (ed. a IV-a, Editura Miron, 1991)

=== Translations (selection) ===
- Antologia bilingvă Shakespeare ("Shakespeare Bilingual Anthology"), co-author (with Leon Levițchi), 1964
- Hamlet, co-author (with Leon Levițchi)
- Richard III, co-author (with Leon Levițchi)
- Beowulf, co-author (with Leon Levițchi)
- Povestiri din Canterbury ("The Canterbury Tales") by Geoffrey Chaucer
- Trolius si Cressida ("Troilus and Criseyde") by Geoffrey Chaucer
- Cartea ducesei ("The Book of the Duchess") by Geoffrey Chaucer
- Cartea faimei ("The House of Fame") by Geoffrey Chaucer
- Legenda femeilor vestite ("The Legend of Good Women") by Geoffrey Chaucer
- Like Diamonds in Coal Asleep, co-author (with Leon Levițchi and Andrei Bantaș)
- Romanian Poets of Our Time, co-author, 1974, Univers Publishing House
- Meșterul Manole

== Awards ==
- He was awarded the Romanian Writers' Union Translation Prize for his translations twice, for his translations of Chaucer and Meșterul Manole
