= George Anania =

Romanian science fiction writer

- Born: July 14, 1941; Măgurele, Kingdom of Romania
- Died: April 5, 2013 (aged 71)
- Education: University of Bucharest
- Occupations: short story writer, novelist, translator
- Writing career
- Period: 1962–2013
- Genre: science fiction

George Anania (Romanian pronunciation: [ˈdʒe̯ordʒe anaˈni.a]; July 14, 1941 – April 5, 2013) was a Romanian science-fiction writer and translator.

Born in Măgurele, Ilfov County, he graduated from the University of Bucharest in 1964.

== Published books ==
=== Novels ===
- Corsarul de fier (1966)
- Test de fiabilitate (1981), Editura Albatros
- O experiență neobișnuită (1989), Editura Ion Creangă
- Acțiunea Lebăda (1991), Editura Ion Creangă

=== With Romulus Bărbulescu ===
- Constelația din ape (1962), Colecția "Povestiri științifico-fantastice" nr. 174–179 (English: Constellations from the Waters)
- Captiv în inima Galaxiei (1964), CPSF 226
- Statuia șarpelui (1967), Editura Tineretului
- Doando (1969) – Editura Tineretului
- Planeta umbrelelor albastre (1969), Colecția "Povestiri științifico-fantastice" nr. 356-359
- Ferma oamenilor de piatră (1970), Editura Tineretului (en. The Stone Men Farm)
- Paralela-enigmă (1973), Editura Tineretului
- Șarpele blând al infinitului (1977)
- Cât de mic poate fi infernul? (1993), Editura Odeon

== See also ==
- Romulus Bărbulescu
