= Octav Pancu-Iași =

Romanian novelist and children's writer

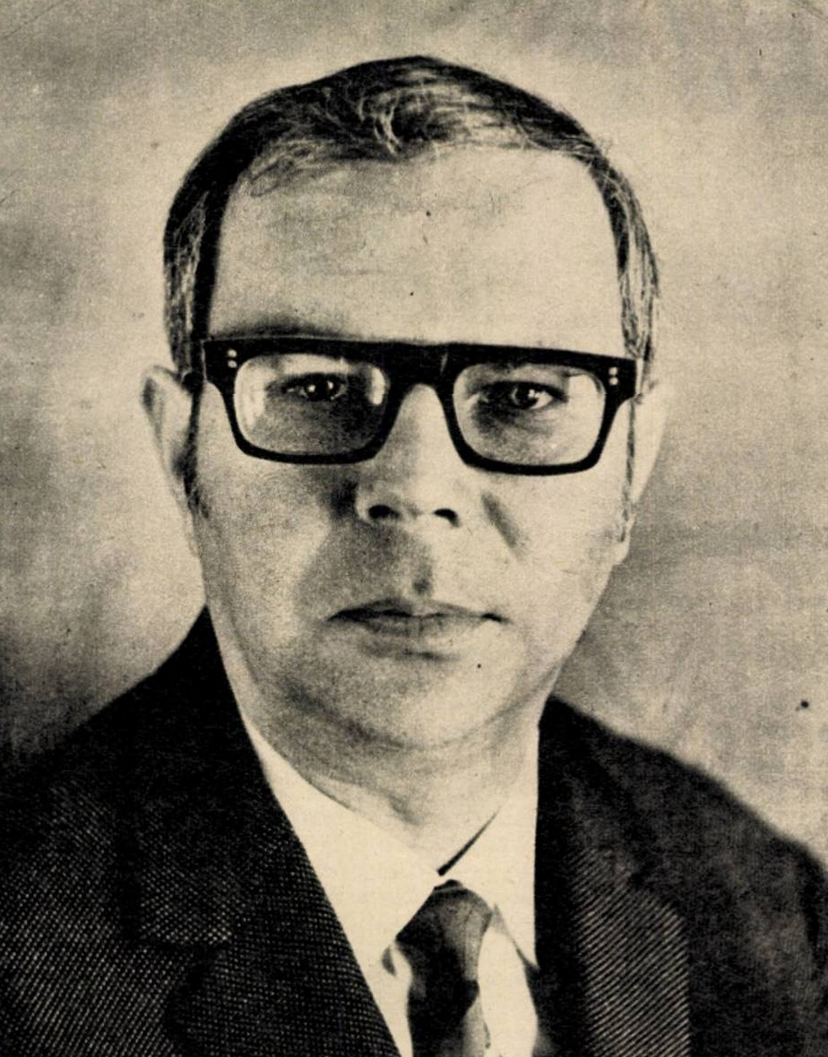
Pancu-Iași in 1975

Octav Pancu-Iași (14 April 1929 – 16 April 1975) was a leading Romanian novelist and children's writer. Born Octav Pancu, he later added the name of his hometown to his surname.

== Biography ==
The son of Basil Pancu, a civil servant, he attended schools in Iași and Bucharest. He worked as an editor for Romanian Radio (1947–58), in film (1959–62) and with the Cutezatorii magazine (1967–69). His writing career started in 1949 with a volume of poetry Timpul sta pe loc? (Does Time Stand Still?). He published two novels: Marea batalie de la Iazul Mic (The Great Battle of the Little Pond, 1953) and Cartea cu ochi albastri (The Book with Blue Eyes, 1959) and wrote many stories for children. He also wrote the screenplays Vara romantică (Romantic Summer, 1961), Tată de duminică (Sunday Father, 1975) and Singurătatea florilor (The Loneliness of Flowers, 1976).

Pancu-Iași's works have been translated into several languages, especially German and Czech but not English. The literary magazine Observator Cultural listed him as one of the leading writers of children's literature in Romania, among others such as Dumitru Almaș, Călin Gruia, Gica Iuteș, Mircea Sântimbreanu and Ovidiu Zotta.

He died of a heart attack in Bucharest when he was only 46.

== Selected works ==
Octav Pancu-Iași's principal works in Romanian are listed below. A complete list of publications including all translations is available from the European Library.

- 1949: Timpul sta in loc?, poetry
- 1951: Atunci, in februarie
- 1951: Multe, multe luminite
- 1952: Votez pentru prima oara
- 1953: Marea batalie de la lazul Mic, novel
- 1956: Are tata doi baieti, children's stories
- 1956: Mai e un loc pe genunchi
- 1957: Ala, bala, portocala (dramatized in 1959)
- 1958: Schite in pantaloni scurti
- 1959: Cartea cu ochi albastri, novel
- 1960: Scrisori pe adresa baietilor mei
- 1963: Fat-Frumos cind era mic
- 1964: Ariciul din calimara
- 1967: Punct si de la capat
- 1968: Tartine cu vara si vint
- 1970: Nu fugi, ziua mea frumoasa, children's stories
- 1972: Visine aproape coapte
- 1972: Baiatul de la gara
- 1977: Mai e mult pina diseara?
