= Scrisul Românesc =

Romanian publishing house

Scrisul Românesc is a Romanian publishing house, founded in 1922 in Craiova.
