= Trifa =

Trifa is a Romanian surname. Notable people with the surname include:

- Iosif Trifa (1888–1938), Romanian Orthodox priest and evangelist
- Valerian Trifa (1914–1987), Romanian Orthodox cleric and fascist political activist
- Vlad Trifa, computer scientist
