= Mircea Opriță =

- Born: October 25, 1943 (age 82); Timișoara, Romania
- Occupation: writer
- Known for: science fiction literature
- Notable work: Întîlnire cu meduza

Mircea Opriță (born October 25, 1943, Timișoara) is a Romanian writer, editor, essayist, critic, historian and translator of science fiction literature. Mircea Opriță is a prominent figure in the Romanian sci-fi literary environment, at the peak of a six-decade career.

== Biography ==
Between 1961 and 1966, he attended the Faculty of Philology at Babeș-Bolyai University in Cluj.

He collaborated with the magazines Steaua, Tribuna , Vatra, Helion, Helion Online, etc.

He obtained his doctorate in universal and comparative literature, with the thesis Discursul utopic, 1999, published with the same title in 2000. Between 1972 and 1999 he worked as a book editor at Dacia publishing house in Cluj. Between 1994 – 1996 and 2002 – 2006 he held the position of Director of the Romanian Cultural Institute in Budapest. He was President of the Romanian Association of Science Fiction Clubs and Authors and a member of the Writers' Union Council and Steering Committee (2000-2004).

== Debut ==
He made his debut with the poem Cântec pentru rachetă, in the Cluj newspaper Făclia (1960).

He debuted in science fiction in 1964 in the magazine Viața studențească with the story Un cântec din Aldebaran, in a competition organized by the editors with the theme "How do you see our planet in the 21st century?"

His first volume of science fiction stories, Întîlnire cu meduza, was published in 1966.

Mircea Opriță is the author of the anthology Cea mai bună dintre lumi (1979) and he collaborated with writer Herbert W. Franke on the German-language anthology SF aus Rumänien.

== Works ==
- Întîlnire cu meduza, Tineretului Publishing House, 1966, science-fiction stories
- Argonautica, science-fiction parody novel, Albatros Publishing House, Bucharest, 1970 (second edition, revised and enlarged, with a foreword by the author, Dacia Publishing House, Cluj-Napoca, 1980)Planeta părăsită, theater play, series for puppets, County Committee for Culture and Art, Puppet Theater Cluj, 1971
- Viața într-o floare, theater for youth, County Center for guidance of popular creation and mass artistic movement, Cluj, 1972
- Jocul cu vipere, verses, Dacia Publishing House, Cluj-Napoca, 1972
- Nopțile memoriei, short stories, Albatros Publishing House, Bucharest, 1973
- Adevărul despre himere, short stories, Cartea Românească Publishing House, Bucharest, 1976
- Păsărea de lut, novel, Dacia Publishing House, Cluj-Napoca, 1976
- Figurine de ceară, short stories, with a foreword by Ion Hobana, Dacia Publishing House, Cluj-Napoca, 1978
- Semnul licornului, short stories, Albatros Publishing House, Bucharest, 1980
- Cina cea mai lungă, novel, Dacia Publishing House, Cluj-Napoca, 1983
- HG Wells: Utopia modernă, critical essay, Albatros Publishing House, Bucharest, 1983
- Judecătorii, a story in the anthology Return to the Blue Planet, 1989
- Anticipația românească. Un capitol de istorie literară, Dacia Publishing House, Cluj-Napoca, 1994 (2nd ed. revised and enlarged, Viitorul Românesc Publishing House, Bucharest, 2003)

=== Translator ===
- translated novels by HG Wells and stories by HP Lovecraft into Romanian

== Literary awards and distinctions ==
- The Writers' Union Award, Nopțile memoriei, 1973 (awarded 1974);
- The Cluj Writers' Association Awards for the works: H. G. Wells: Utopia modernă, 1983 (awarded in 1984), Anticipația românească, 1994 (awarded in 1985), Discursul utopic, 2000 (awarded in 2001);
- The Ion Agârbiceanu Award, for the novel Călătorie în Capricia, 2011 (awarded in 2012)

== See also ==
- List of Romanian science fiction writers

== Bibliography ==
- Cătălin Badea Gheracostea about the novel Călătorie în Capricia, Cultural Observatory, April 2012
- Cornel Secu in Nautilus magazine, August 2013
- Aurel Cărășel, Dicționar S.F., Nautilus magazine, 2009
- The encyclopedia DICȚIONAR SF: artiști plastici, autori, editori, mass-media, motive, personalități, Nemira Publishing House, Bucharest, 1999;
- John Clute & Peter Nicholls, The Encyclopedia of Science Fiction
- Valeriu Cristea, in Domeniul criticii, Romanian Book Publishing House, Bucharest, 1975;
- Ion Hobana, foreword to Figurine de ceară, Dacia Publishing House, Cluj-Napoca, 1978;
- Mircea Iorgulescu, in Scriitori tineri contemporani, Eminescu Publishing House, Bucharest, 1978;
- Florin Manolescu, Mircea Opriță, profil de autor, in Almanac Anticipatia 1987, Bucharest, 1986;
- Nicolae Steinhardt, in Monologul polifonic, Dacia Publishing House, Cluj-Napoca, 1991;
- Anton Cosma, in Romanul românesc contemporan, 1945–1985, vol. II. Metarealismul, Cluj University Press, 1998;
- Petru Poantă, in Dicționar de poeți. Clujul contemporan, Forum Cultural Foundation, Cluj-Napoca, 1998;
- the article Mircea Opriță, in Mircea Zaciu, Marian Papahagi, Aurel Sasu, Dicționarul scriitorilor români, M – Q, Bucharest, Albatros Publishing House, 2001;
- Cornel Robu, O „cheie de lectură” la ora re-lecturii, introductory study on Figurine de ceară. Integrala povestirilor SF, Viitorul Românesc Publishing House, Bucharest, 2004.
