= Andrei Bantaș =

Andrei Bantaș (November 30, 1930 in Iași – January 17, 1997 in Bucharest) was a Romanian lexicographer, translator and teacher.

He was professor of English language and literature at the University of Bucharest, Romania.

Together with Leon Levițchi he is one of the best known authors of English/Romanian dictionaries.

The Andrei Bantaș Translation Prize is named after him.

== Books (selection) ==
- Bantaș, Andrei & Rădulescu, Mihai, Capcanele limbii engleze – False Friends, București, Editura Didactică și Pedagogică, 1979
- co-author (with Elena Croitoru) of Didactica traducerii ("The Didactics of Translation").

== Translations (selection) ==
- Ioan Flora, Cincizeci de romane si alte utopii / Fifty Novels and Other Utopias, trans. Andrei Bantaș and Richard Collins (Bucharest: Editura Eminescu, 1996).
- Charles Dickens – Viaṭa Mântuitorului nostru Iisus Hristos ("The Life of Our Lord")
- W. Somerset Maugham – Vălul pictat ("The Painted Veil")
- Arthur Koestler- Al treisprezecelea trib: Khazarii ("The Thirteenth Tribe: The Khazar Empire and Its Heritage")
- Samuel Butler- Ṣi tu vei fi ṭărână ("The Way of All Flesh")
- W. Somerset Maugham- Plăcerile vieṭii ("Of Human Bondage")
- D. H. Lawrence- Omul care murise ("The Man Who Died")
- Oscar Wilde- Toate povestirile

== Awards ==
- Romanian Writers' Union Prize (1978)

== See also ==
- Trei culori
