= Socola Mică Church =

Orthodox church in Iași, Romania

Coordinates: 47.1252°N 27.6156°E

The Socola Mică Church (Romanian: Biserica Socola Mică) is a Romanian Orthodox church located at 9 Socola Lane in Iași, Romania. It is dedicated to the Nativity of Mary, Athanasius of Alexandria and Cyril of Alexandria.

After the seminary at Socola Monastery opened and the church became a students' chapel, local residents decided to build a new church. The church was blessed in 1809, as can be read from an inscription on a small reliquary placed in the altar; a date of 1812 has also been proposed. The ktitor was the boyar Țânașa (Atanasie) Gosan, whose name gave rise to the church's second dedication. He also willed an annuity of 20 lei for candles and oil. The first parishioners were grape growers. Significant repairs were carried out in 1838. Its local significance grew when the Socola Monastery church underwent repairs, leaving it the only functioning place of worship in the area.

Made of brick on a stone foundation, the church is small in size. It is trefoil in shape, with a foyer, vestibule, nave and altar. There are two symmetrical semicircular apses, each with a narrow arched window. Other windows ensure that light streams into the building. The outside walls are plastered and lack decoration; the roof is simple, in two sections. The interior walls are not painted. There is a hexagonal spire above the foyer, with a window on each face. Throughout, the ceilings are flat, made of varnished beams. The foyer and bell tower above the entrance were rebuilt in 1995. The church underwent restorations, including painting of the whole interior, from 2006 to 2012. The iconostasis features the relics of Saints Charalambos, Pantaleon, Cosmas, with Luke the Evangelist added later.

The church is listed as a historic monument by Romania's Ministry of Culture and Religious Affairs.
