= Trifești, Rezina =

Trifești
- Village
- Location within Moldova
- Coordinates: 47.6761111111°N 28.8033333333°E
- Country: Moldova
- District: Rezina District

Government
  - Mayor: Mihail Budurin (Independent)

Population (2014 census)
  - Total: 720
- Time zone: UTC+2 (EET)
  - Summer (DST): UTC+3 (EEST)
- Website: [trifesti.jimdo.com]

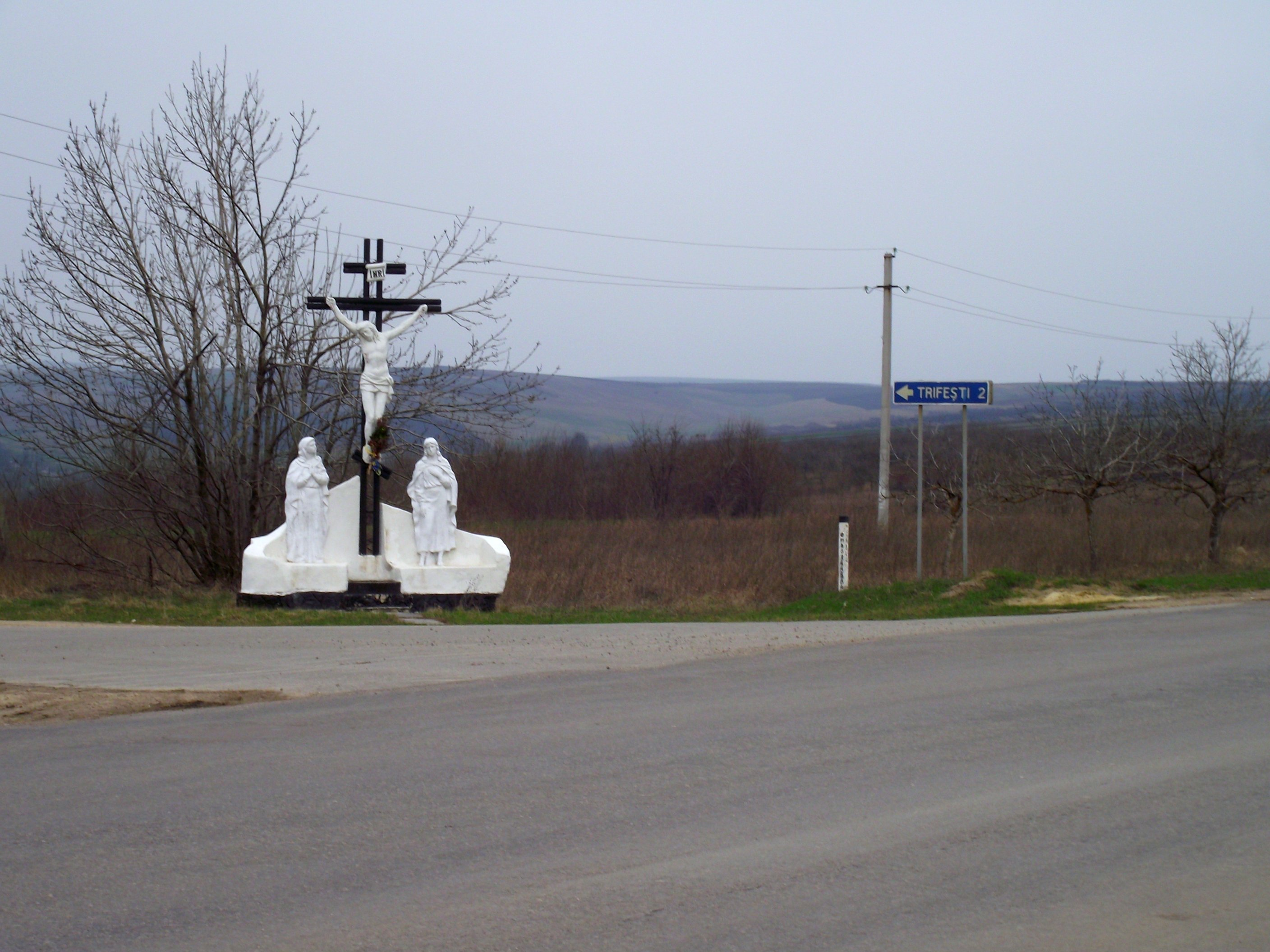
A roadside monument with a cross in Trifești, Rezina District, Moldova

Trifești is a village in Rezina District, Moldova.

== Natives ==
- Călin Gruia (1915-1989), writer, author of children's fairy tales and poems
