= Leon Levițchi =

Romanian philologist and translator

- Leon Levițchi
- Born: 27 August 1918; Edineț, Hotin County, Kingdom of Romania
- Died: 16 October 1991 (aged 73); Bucharest, Romania
- Citizenship: Romanian
- Education: English language and literature, aesthetics, and literary criticism
- Alma mater: University of Bucharest
- Occupations: University professor, translator, lexicographer
- Employer(s): University of Bucharest, Romania
- Known for: translations of Shakespeare's Complete Works into Romanian; Romanian-English/English-Romanian dictionaries
- Notable work: William Shakespeare, Opere complete, A History of Romanian Literature
- Children: Two daughters
- Parent(s): Diomid Leu (father) and Zenovia Gârlea (mother)
- Awards: Romanian Academy Award; Romanian Writers' Union's Translation Award

Signature
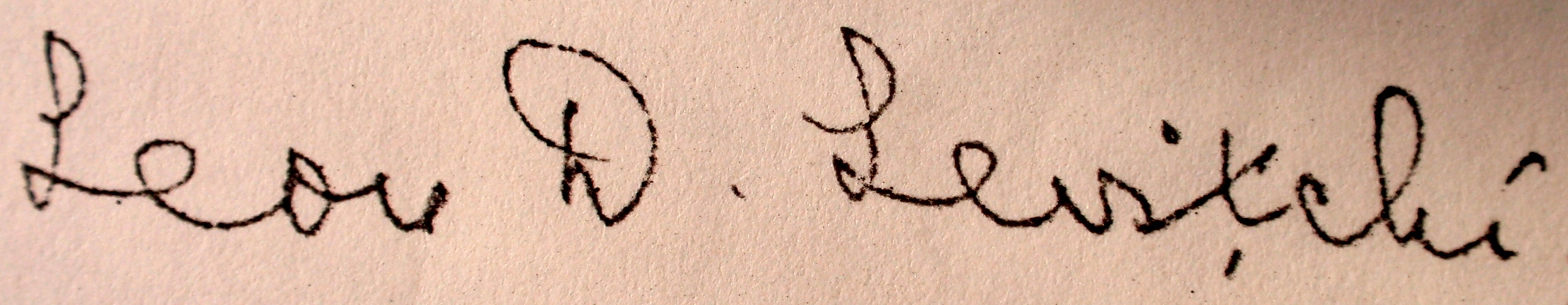

Leon Levițchi (27 August 1918 – 16 October 1991) was a Romanian philologist and translator who specialised in the study of the English language and literature.

== Life ==
The son of Diomid Leu, a clergyman and teacher, and Zenovia Gârlea, a primary school teacher, he went to secondary school in Chernivtsi and Hotin, taking his baccalaureat exam in Chernivtsi in 1937. Due to his good results, he was rewarded with a journey to Norway.

From 1937 to 1941 he studied at the School of English Studies at The Department of Letters and Philosophy, University of Bucharest. His major was English language and literature, while his minor was aesthetics and literary criticism.

During the Second World War, he was an interpreter and translator for the Romanian military.

After the war, he started teaching English, first at high school level, and then at the University of Bucharest, where he ultimately became a professor. He retired in 1980.

Alone, and with Dan Duṭescu, he translated Eminescu's poems into English.

Together with fellow researcher Andrei Bantaș, Levițchi edited in 1991 what is so far the most comprehensive English-Romanian dictionary on paper, with over 70,000 entries. The two had also previously published a bilingual Romanian-English edition of Mihai Eminescu's poems, translated into English by themselves.

He had two daughters.

== Works (selection) ==
- Dicționar român-englez, București, Ed. Științifică, 1960, 1965, 1973 ("Romanian-English dictionary")
- Gramatica limbii engleze, București, Ed. Științifică, 1967 (with Ioan Preda) ("English grammar book")
- Îndrumar pentru traducătorii din limba engleză în limba română. București: Editura științifică și enciclopedică, 1975 ("A Guide for English to Romanian Translators")
- Studii shakespeariene. Cluj-Napoca: Dacia, 1976 ("Shakesperean Studies")
- Istoria literaturii engleze și americane, vol. I-II. Cluj-Napoca: Dacia, 1985-1994 ("A History of English and American Literature")
- Limba engleză fără profesor. București: Teora, 1997 ("Teach Yourself English")
- Manualul traducătorului de limba engleză. București: Teora, 1994 ("A Manual for English Translators")
- Dicționar englez-român (edited with Andrei Bantaș), 1991 ("English-Romanian Dictionary")
- A History of Romanian Literature, 1989 (translation of George Călinescu's Istoria literaturii române de la origini pînă în prezent, 1941; re-edited by Al. Piru, 1982
- William Shakespeare, Opere complete, 9 volumes, co-author (with Virgiliu Stefănescu-Drăgănești), 1988-1995

== Memberships ==
- Romanian Writers' Union (since 1955)
- International Association of University Professors of English

== Awards ==
- Romanian Academy Award
- Romanian Writers' Union's Translation Award, 1972 and 1978
