= Puiu Manu =

Romanian artist

Puiu Manu (born September 14, 1928 in Bucharest) is a Romanian graphic designer and comic book creator.
