= List of Romanian-language publishers =

This is a list of publishers of works in Romanian.

== A ==
- Editura Academiei
- Editura Adevărul
- Editura Albatros
- Editura Aldine
- Editura ALFA
- Editura ALL
- Grupul Editorial AMALTEA
- Amco Press
- Editura Anastasia
- Editura Antim Ivireanul
- Editura Aquila '93
- Editura Art
- Editura Arta Grafică
- Editura Artemis

== B ==
- Editura Bunavestire

== C ==
- Editura C. H. Beck
- Editura Cartea Aromână
- Cartea Creștină
- Editura Cartea de Buzunar
- Cartea Românească
- Editura Cartea Românească Educațional
- Editura Cartea Rusă
- Cartea Universitară
- Editura Cartier
- Editura Casa Radio
- Editura Casa Şcoalelor
- cIMeC – Institutul de Memorie Culturală
- Editura Națională Ciornei
- Editura Christiana
- Editura Compania
- Editura Contrafort
- Editura Corint
- Crime Scene Press
- Editura Cugetarea
- Editura Cultura Națională
- Editura Curtea Veche
- Editura Cuvântul

== D ==
- Editura Dacia
- Editura Danubius
- Editura Didactică și Pedagogică

== E ==
- Editura Economică
- Editura EFES
- Editura Eikon
- Editura Eminescu
- Editura Evenimentul Românesc
- Egmont România

== F ==
- Editura Facla
- Editura Folium
- Frații Șaraga
- Editura Fundației Culturale Române
- Editura Fundației România de Mâine
- Editura Fundațiilor Regale

== G ==
- Editura Garamond

== H ==
- Editura Hasefer
- Editura Hecate
- Humanitas
- Editura Hyperion

== I ==
- Editura Idea
- Institutul de Arte Grafice Carol Gobl
- Institutul European
- Institutul Samitca
- Editura Ion Creangă

== J ==
- Editura Junimea

== K ==
- Editura Kriterion

== L ==
- Editura de stat pentru literatură şi artă
- Editura Librăriei Leon Alcaly
- Editura Limes
- Editura Litera
- Editura Litera International
- Editura LiterNet
- Editura pentru literatură
- Editura pentru literatură universală

== M ==
- Editura Medicală
- Editura Meridiane
- Editura Militară
- Editura Moldova
- Monitorul Oficial
- Editura Mysterio

== N ==
- Editura Nemira
- Editura Niculescu

== P ==
- Editura Paideia
- Editura Paralela 45
- Polirom
- Editura Politehnica
- Editura Politehnium
- Editura Politică
- Editura Pontica
- Editura Prior & Books
- Editura Prometeu
- Editura Prut Internațional

== R ==
- RAO Publishing
- ROMPRES
- Editura Roza Vânturilor

== S ==
- Editura Saeculum I.O.
- Editura Saga
- Editura Scrisul Românesc
- Editura Sigma
- Editura Sitech
- Editura Socec
- Editura Sport-Turism

== Ş ==
- Editura Științifică și Enciclopedică

== T ==
- Editura Tehnică
- Editura Teora
- Editura Tineretului
- Editura Tritonic

== U ==
- Editura Uniunii Scriitorilor
- Editura Univers
- Editura Univers Enciclopedic
- Editura Universității Al. I. Cuza
- Editura Universității Lucian Blaga
- Editura Universității din București

== V ==
- Editura de Vest
- Editura Vinea
- Editura Vitruviu
- Editura Vremea

== Z ==
- Editura Ziua
