= Editura Ion Creangă =

- Status: defunct as of c. 2003
- Founded: 1969
- Country of origin: Romania
- Headquarters location: Piața Presei Libere 1 (House of the Free Press), Bucharest
- Distribution: international, mainly Eastern Europe
- Publication types: books, magazines
- Fiction genres: children's literature, comic book, fantasy literature, science fiction

Editura Ion Creangă (Romanian pronunciation: [ediˈtura iˈon ˈkre̯aŋɡə]) was a publishing house based in Bucharest, Romania. Founded as a state-run company under communist rule and named after the 19th-century writer Ion Creangă, it ranked high among Romanian publishers of children's literature, fantasy literature and science fiction. Its activity resulted in many Romanian-language translations of world children's classics, among which were bestselling versions of Jules Verne's complete works and J. R. R. Tolkien's The Hobbit. The company also stood at the core of a phenomenon in local book illustration, assigning contracts to recognized artists such as Sandu Florea, Val Munteanu, Lívia Rusz and Eugen Taru.

During the late years of communism, the enterprise was subject to the intervention of official censorship. In 1988, its publishing of Ana Blandiana's poems, which featured allusions to the communist system, resulted in culturally repressive measures personally ordered by President and Communist Party leader Nicolae Ceaușescu. Editura Ion Creangă survived the 1989 Revolution, but was no longer able to compete with rival companies. It effectively ceased its activity during 2003.

== History ==
=== Beginnings and consolidation ===
Founded in 1969, the publishing house established its reputation during the following two decades. Among its early employees were poet Gheorghe Zarafu, who presided over the enterprise for a while in the 1970s, and writer Tiberiu Utan, who was himself manager of the group in the same decade. Writer and translator Adrian Solomon argued that, "with a few obnoxious exceptions", Editura Ion Creangă mostly published works which generally avoided or went beyond the propaganda characteristics found in Eastern Bloc literature aimed at adults. According to his assessment, while some of the books issued preferred for publishing aimed at attacking "bourgeois" society, even they were ambiguous and may not have contributed to indoctrination beyond the facade aspects.

From early on, the publishing house became an important venue for the Romanian school of book illustration. According to visual artist and journalist Cristiana Radu, the company stood for a "richer and more colorful" tradition of visual art for children, which "paradoxically" thrived under the communist period. In her assessment: "Perhaps also because reality was grayer and more deprived of visual stimuli, the books themselves worked as aesthetic markers. The books which have lit my childhood often crossed the borders, were taken into consideration by foreign editors, reaching countries such as France. During those years, Romania was the country of its area with the richest tradition in this field." Writing in 2007, Arina Stoenescu, herself an illustrator, recalled the contributions of Rusz, Munteanu and Taru as a defining element of her own childhood reading experience. She argued: "The logotype of Ion Creangă Publishing House became a well known symbol, the distinguishing mark of many books with excellent pictures."

Enlisted by Utan, Rusz contributed drawings to reprints of classical works for children in Romanian literature, such as Nicolae Constantin Batzaria's Povești de aur ("Golden Stories") and Creangă's collected fairy tales and Childhood Memories. The latter edition is deemed "legendary" by author György Györfi-Deák. After 1971, the company also issued Caseta cu bucurii ("A Caseful of Joys" or "My Bedtime Library"), the main works for children by Emil Gârleanu, with illustrations by Ileana Ceaușu-Pandele.

Some projects of the period recovered the legacy of Romanian Surrealism. One notable Editura Ion Creangă edition was Iordan Chimet's Cele 12 luni ale visului. O antologie a inocenței ("The 12 Months of Dreaming. An Anthology of Innocence"), noted for revisiting the Surrealists' visual vocabulary and for subverting the official communist take on culture. Editura Ion Creangă also published, in 1976, O ureche de dulceață și-o ureche de pelin ("An Ear of Jam and an Ear of Wine") by Ion Caraion, verse in which the author depicted allegorically the "personal hell" of his life during and after communist labor camps. In 1979, another acclaimed edition reissued Apolodor the Penguin by 1940s Surrealist Gellu Naum, with drawings by Dan Stanciu.

In addition to encouraging artistic expression in regular book illustration, Editura Ion Creangă played a part in promoting Romanian comic book authors. Among them was Sandu Florea, known for his work in science fiction comics, and who allegedly became the first local comics author to make a living exclusively from his art. In 1974, Ion Creangă also published Mircea Possa's Titilică, băiat fără frică ("Titilică, a Fearless Boy"), which some regard as one of the best Romanian comic books in its generation.

=== Translation projects ===
A significant portion of the group's activities was dedicated to translations from foreign literature, some of which marked important moments in local editorial history. Such milestones included several editions of Leon Levițchi's translation from Jonathan Swift's Gulliver, called "without doubt the best of all [Romanian Gulliver editions] so far" by scholar Mihaela Mudure, as well as Wilhelm Hauff's Märchen (Basme, illustrated by Rusz) and, in a "richly illustrated edition" of 1978, J. M. Barrie's Peter and Wendy (translators Ovidiu Constantinescu and Andrei Bantaș). Also noted were its luxury edition of Gargantua and Pantagruel, issued in collaboration with the Sibiu typography Arta Grafică, and a 1978 version of Ugo Scotti Berni's La promessa sposa di Pinocchio. The company also ran a special paperback series, Povești nemuritoare ("Immortal Tales"), which, in addition to Romanian folklore, introduced the public to samples of foreign legends, including Turkish ones. In cooperation with Raduga Publishing House, Editura Ion Creangă also published the Neznaika (Habarnam) series by Soviet author Nikolay Nosov (1986).

A notable series inaugurated by the company was the Jules Verne "yellow covers" reader, published as a set of 40 volumes bound in boards and illustrated with copies of the original French lithographs. As noted by Zarafu, management decided in favor of the oldest illustrations only because their copyright had expired. The Verne books were all bestsellers by Romanian standards, reportedly selling on average some 200,000 copies per issue.

Among these volumes, linguist Raluca Anamaria Vida chose as a study case Insula misterioasă ("The Mysterious Island"), translated by Veronica and Ion Mihăileanu. Contrasting it to previous translations from the 1950s, Vida argued that the Mihăileanus' work was better suited to the original text. She also analyzed the relative liberalization that had occurred in the meantime, noting that the new version was more accepting of Verne's references to religion, and lacked the "ridiculous footnotes" which encouraged the reader to interpret the text from a Marxist-Leninist perspective. Also in the "yellow covers" series was Vladimir Colin's translation of Carpathian Castle, a book set in Transylvania and having ethnic Romanians among its protagonists. Colin's rendition, in part a retranslation, parted with other Romanian versions. These had noted Verne's use of obscure words to designate places and names as his approximate renditions of Romanian, and had sought to reconstruct them into readable Romanian; instead, Colin preferred to observe the original spelling throughout.

In 1975, Editura Ion Creangă also published the first Romanian version of J. R. R. Tolkien's The Hobbit, translated from English by Catinca Ralea, and carrying the title O poveste cu un hobbit ("A Story with a Hobbit"). According to journalist Adina Popescu, Ralea's text was "excellent", and the volume itself stood among "the fundamental books of the last generation to have lived its childhood during communism." O poveste cu un hobbit featured original illustrations by Rusz, who relied exclusively on her imagination for depicting the main characters, as the lack of Tolkien editions in Romania made it impossible for her to find other points of visual reference. Her contribution has nevertheless earned her an international profile among Tolkien illustrators.

In additions to adaptations into Romanian, Editura Ion Creangă was noted for a state-assigned translation program into minority languages, specifically Hungarian (for Hungarian-Romanians) and German (for German-Romanians). Ion Creangă, Kriterion, Albatros, Facla publishing houses were especially active in fulfilling the growing need for German-language books, in particular by presenting special awards to German authors and translators. These activities also incorporated a political aspect: a 1975 official report on cultural policies, which listed Ion Creangă alongside Editura Dacia and Kriterion as the year's most significant contributors to the program, explained the role it had in the "communist education of readers".

The group was also active in circulating translated Romanian works for children within the wider world: from 1971, Caseta cu bucurii and some of Gârleanu's other works were also issued in German, Hungarian, English, Swedish and Czech. A 1986 Spanish edition, titled Mi biblioteca para leer, was published in cooperation with Cuba's Editorial Gente Nueva.

=== Communist pressures and Arpagic scandal ===
Progressively in the late 1970s and throughout the 1980s, Ion Creangă's projects often stood in contrast with the tightening of political pressures and the economic decline. According to Arina Stoenescu: "By the end of the communist era, when the poor quality of paper and print made the pictures in fiction literature almost unintelligible, the strong colors and powerful black and white illustrations managed to reach the children and offered them a friendlier and happier sight of the world." Looking back on the same interval and the successful Verne collection, writer Ion Hobana noted: "In the '80s, reading was the only way to make one's spare time informative and entertaining. Many have [since] forgotten that all they could watch on television amounted to a daily two-hour program, never mind the content..." In the final decade of communist rule, Editura Ion Creangă published some works of propaganda for the youth, including communist education teaching aides by Tudor Opriș and Maria Obaciu.

Additionally, the publishing house felt the tightening of censorship, a policy encouraged by communist leader Nicolae Ceaușescu. A notable incident took place in 1988, when Editura Ion Creangă and poet Ana Blandiana became involved in a political scandal involving the highest levels of communist power. Having debuted in children's poetry with the fascicle Întîmplări din grădina mea ("Incidents in My Garden"), Blandiana followed up with Alte întîmplări din grădina mea ("Some Other Incidents in My Garden") and Întîmplări de pe strada mea ("Incidents on My Street"). The latter transformed its hero, Arpagic the Cat, into a satirical depiction of Ceaușescu, in particular by introducing oblique references to the leader's personality cult and propaganda system. The public followed up on the hint, and a number of clandestine jokes surfacing at the time reportedly referred to Ceaușescu as "Arpagic".

Censors deciphered these messages only after the volume's release, and reported the matter to Ceaușescu personally, leading to an almost complete ban on Blandiana's work. The Securitate secret police oversaw further punitive measures, forcing the early retirement of Editura Ion Creangă's chief manager Viniciu Gafița and moving proofreader Doina Mandaj, stripped of her political position, to the Albatros group. In the short interval before Întîmplări de pe strada mea was withdrawn from shops, rumors spread about the irritation it caused to communist authorities, and, as a consequence, sales increased significantly.

=== Final years ===
The publishing house survived the December 1989 Revolution which toppled communism. Around the year 2000, it was managed by poet Daniela Crăsnaru. It was at the time openly engaged in the process of recovering anti-communist literature, publishing a diary of Gulag imprisonment, by the Bessarabian author Naum V. Lospa.

The company faced competition from newly founded independent publishers of children's books, and remained the only publisher in this class to receive subventions from the Ministry of Culture. In 2001, these amounted to 178 million lei, the 5th largest in this category of sponsorships. A slow privatization process began in 2003, under the watch of the Agency for the Recovery of State Assets. Editura Ion Creangă effectively closed down, even though the privatization monitoring case was only sealed in November 2009.

Comparing the book illustration scene at Ion Creangă with the post-1989 situation, Cristiana Radu contended that new publishers resorted to "traditional, tame and descriptive variants" or "the Disney solution", while the public was left without "visual education". In later years, Editura Ion Creangă editions became involved in debates about intellectual property and copyright infringement in respect to communist-era works. Humanitas consortium released, in 2003 and 2010, new versions of Nosov's Habarnam; a controversy was sparked when Humanitas demanded the closure of Romania's Nosov fansite, which, claiming that the communist copyright law was void, had digitized the 1986 edition.
