= I. C. Vissarion =

Romanian prose writer, poet, and political (1879–1951)

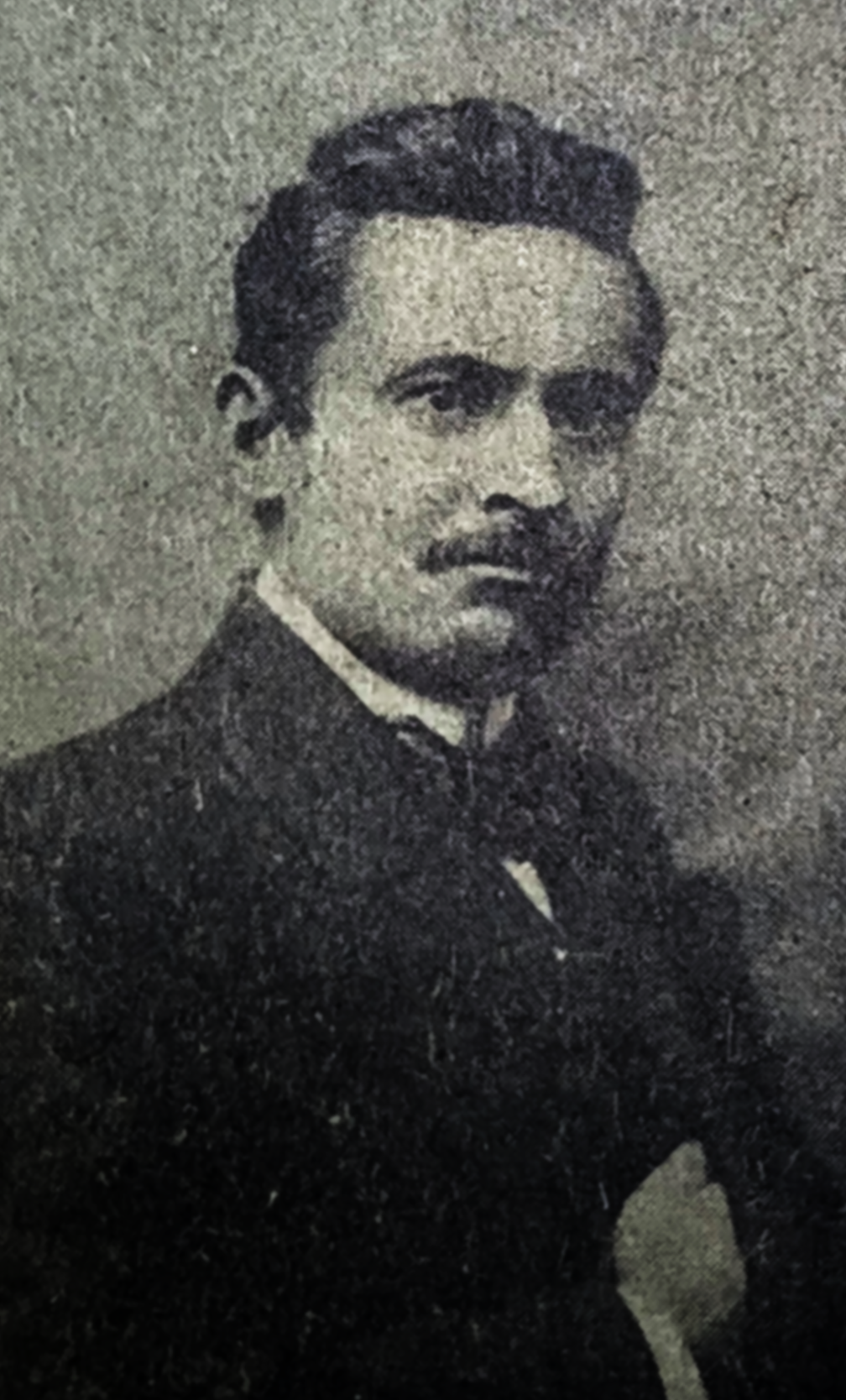
- Portrait photograph, published alongside his story Islaz ieftin
- Born: Iancu Visarion; 2 February 1879; Costeștii din Vale, Dâmbovița County, Principality of Romania
- Died: 5 November 1951 (aged 72); Costeștii din Vale, Argeș Region, Romanian People's Republic
- Occupations: Agriculturalist; gamekeeper; civil servant; accountant; amateur scientist; composer; folklorist; journalist; screenwriter; film actor; shoemaker; porter
- Writing career
- Period: c. 1899–1951
- Genres: Memoir; novella; sketch story; diary; autofiction; essay; science fantasy; lyric poetry; romance novel; historical novel; historical drama; satire; feuilleton
- Literary movement: Social realism; Sămănătorul; Poporanism; Modernism; Sburătorul

Iancu Constantin Vissarion (born Iancu Visarion, also credited as Ion Vissarion; 2 February 1879 – 5 November 1951) was a Romanian writer and political agitator, also known as an inventor, esotericist, and promoter of pseudoscience. He lived most of his life in Costeștii din Vale village and was advertised as one of the rare and self-taught "peasant writers"; however, he held a variety of jobs, from notary to railway porter, and eventually to a wealthy landowner. His literary beginnings were as a student of Romanian folklore and poet-raconteur, with an inclination toward agrarian socialism. Vissarion's anti-establishment positioning saw his participation in the peasants' revolt of early 1907, which resulted in his capture by the Land Forces and his narrowly escaping the death penalty. This experience informed several of his works, some of which were taken up by the socialist newspaper România Muncitoare in the 1910s. Vissarion cultivated traditionalist themes in tune with Sămănătorul's group ideology, and for this reason, was rejected as inauthentic by left-wingers such as Ion Pas and Panait Istrati. By contrast, he was embraced by the literary mainstream and likewise became an outsider ally of the Symbolist movement, cultivating friendships with Gala Galaction and Tudor Arghezi.

Vissarion's literary career was paused by World War I and a German occupation—events which became the main focus in some of his later accounts. He was close to the "Germanophile" newspapers put out by Arghezi and Galaction but, unlike them, was not marginalized by Entente loyalists. His fame peaked in the 1920s, when he published steadily, with volumes of prose that earned critical accolades but also with poetry that critics regarded as "tasteless". During the interwar, Vissarion slowly adapted his narrative style to the objectivity of literary modernism, receiving some guidance from Eugen Lovinescu and his Sburătorul circle, but also pioneered Romanian science fiction, adapting it to the format of fairy tales. The latter passion blended with his work as an amateur scientist: having originally fabricated explosives in his home, he turned to fields such as aviation and agricultural mechanics and held several patents—including one for a quasi-helicopter; he was concerned about issues in environmental science, and proposed systems to harness wave power at a worldwide level. After parting with atheism, he became interested in mystical subjects, offering his musings on suggestion, the afterlife, and oneiromancy. In 1925, he contributed the screenplay for the silent film Legenda celor două cruci, where he also appeared as the narrator.

In middle age, Vissarion was an outspokent Romanian nationalist and anti-communist, who once gravitated toward fascism. The communist regime, established in 1948, still lionized him for his former status as a rebel, his scientism, and his cultivation of social realism, while allowing criticism of his mystical conceptions and unevenness of talent. He died in 1951; his work, comprising thousands of pages of unpublished manuscripts, was again promoted by Arghezi into the 1960s. Though largely unknown to the reading public of later generations, he inspired a cult in Dâmbovița County and was a model for local novelist Marin Ioniță. He had a museum in Costeștii din Vale dedicated to him and a literary club in Găești named after him. Vissarion's ten children include Cornelia Vissarion-Mănuceanu, a poet, memoirist, and Radio Free Europe personality.

== Biography ==
=== Early years ===
Vissarion was born in Costeștii din Vale on 2 February 1879. The actual date was only settled in the 1960s when literary scholar Victor Crăciun exposed the various accounts that report dates between 1880 and 1883 as false. The novelist's father was of Greek ethnicity, originally from Thessaloniki, Salonica Eyalet. Working as a merchant in the Kingdom of Romania, he was not officially married to Iancu's mother Ilinca, who was herself an ethnic Romanian peasant. Iancu attended primary school in his native village from 1886 to 1891, but resented the experience of formal education since it asked him to memorize things, in particular "ideas disseminated by the so-called savants." In one account of his childhood, he mentioned having been sponsored by a male benefactor, who died before he could help him with his studies. Though believed by some biographers to have been abandoned by his mother from birth, he lived in her house until 1891, when she also died. He subsequently moved to Titu and then to his grandfather's home in Bucharest, where he learned the shoemaker's trade from 1892 to 1895. His father, meanwhile, married another woman, from whom he had nine children.

Iancu's family name was originally spelled "Visarion", but he later added another "s". This was either because he intended to separate himself from his half-siblings or because he wanted to honor a church he once visited during a trip to Greece. As a youth, Iancu "read anything I could get my hands on", and was soon prompted to write things of his own, sending poetry and prose fragments to various magazine editors. He recalls that he was largely shunned and derided for his spelling, punctuation, and grammatical errors. He only decided to follow such advice after Constantin Dobrescu-Argeș and Alexandru Valescu, as editors of the rural magazine Gazeta Țăranilor, noted his talent but informed him that he still needed to "learn from books". He took pains re-learning the literary idiom from a standard textbook by Heimann Hariton Tiktin, and from closely reading literary works by Barbu Ștefănescu Delavrancea and other authors held in high regard. At some point in his youth, Vissarion met Delavrancea, who reportedly encouraged him to continue writing. Vissarion was trying to obtain informal assistance for being accepted into a regular school. He asked for support from Delavrancea, as well as from other "great men" (such as Ion Luca Caragiale and Alexandru Vlahuță), but found himself shunned by the education system.

His retouched poems finally appearing in Gazeta Țăranilor and in the satirical newspaper Hazul Satelor, Vissarion felt encouraged to continue his self-education. He had befriended a military cadet, Costică Zaharescu, who let him read his schoolbooks, introducing Vissarion to geometry, trigonometry, and ballistics. He memorized their content and understood their meaning much later in life. His first contact with algebra was through a book that he reviewed in an antiquarian's shop. He then applied himself to learning French, which allowed him to expand his familiarity with scientific literature. Vissarion studied to become a courthouse clerk in Titu and was qualified as a notary. Despite never graduating primary school, he entered the civil service and briefly worked as a clerk at the sub-prefectural office, also located in Titu. By some accounts, he also clerked at the Tobacco Monopoly and kept the books for a local mill.

In 1898, Vissarion married a woman known as Gheorghița or Gherghița, who was the granddaughter or niece of Popa Nica, the Orthodox parish priest in Patruzeci-de-Cruci (later the hero of two stories by Vissarion). The young clerk still continued to declare his search for an "ideal love", describing his imaginary partner as having "tender breasts [and] an angel-like delicacy". In the "erotic circumstances" of his youth, he composed love songs, including a romance called Maria neichii, Marie ("Maria, My Maria"), which still enjoyed great success some 50 years after its release. He would sire thirteen children with Gheorghița, of whom ten survived into adulthood. The writer sparked public ridicule when he insisted on baptizing them after scientific pioneers or known leftists—including Edison, Galileo, Garibaldi, Giordano, Franklin, Marconi, and Voltaire.

Gheorghița's "continuous bearing of children" pushed Vissarion to work as a farmer throughout the day, only able to read and write at nighttime. Despite settling down in this way, he still focused on his research, which at the time was mainly in chemistry and in the search for obtaining perpetual motion. It included experiments with nitroglycerin, which he washed down in a regular sieve and which resulted in his building up a stock of explosives. The Vissarion home was heavily damaged by an explosion, after which Gheorghița made him swear to focus his attention on less risky pursuits. Vissarion's first book was the collection Draci și strigoi ("Devils and Strigoi", 1899), which retold staples of Romanian folklore from his corner of Muntenia. For a few months in 1901, he served as mayor of Costeștii din Vale.

=== Revolutionary and traditionalist ===
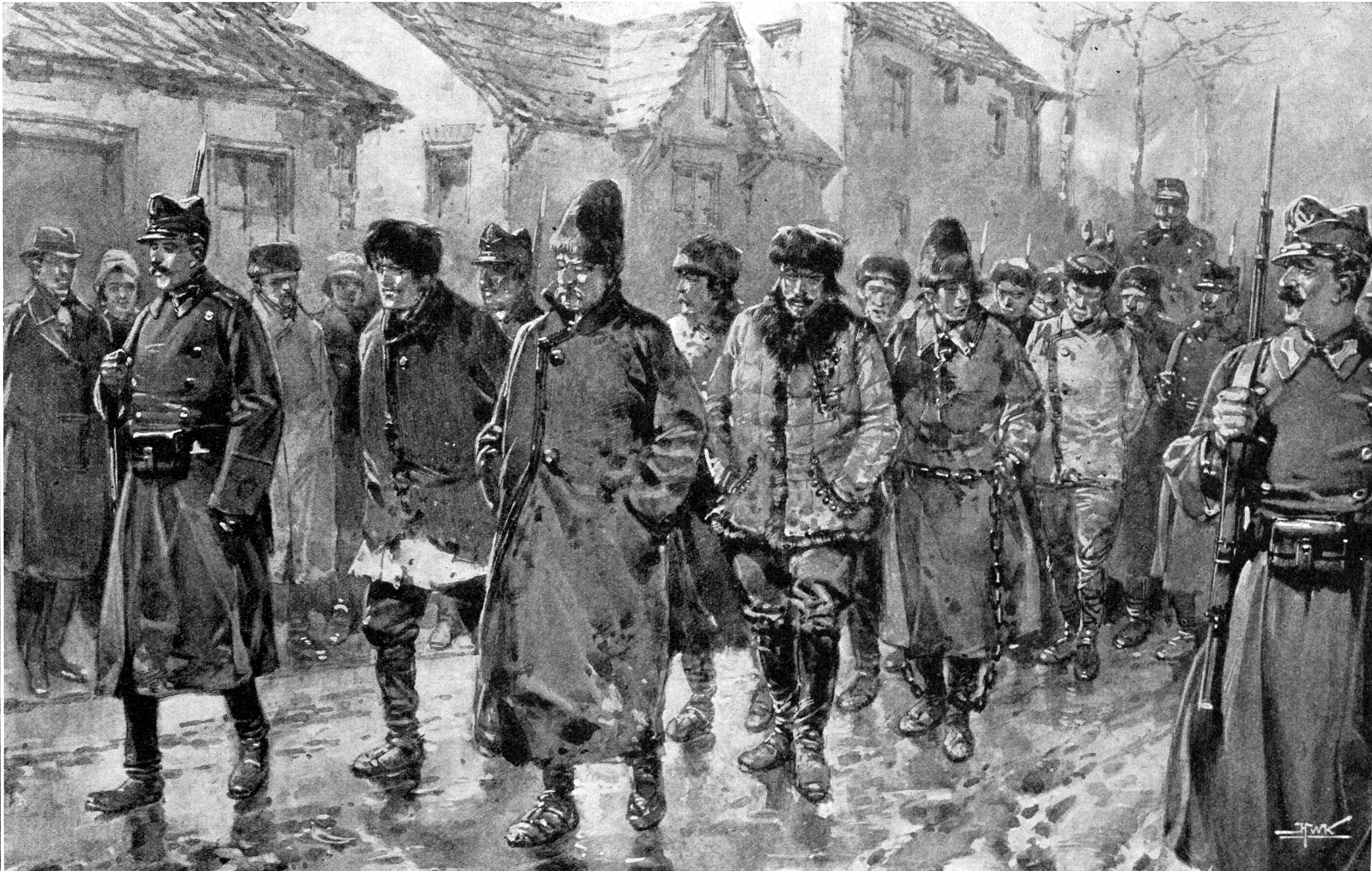
A prisoners' convoy after the Romanian peasants' revolt (drawing by Hermanus Willem Koekkoek, The Illustrated London News, April 1907)

Vissarion's life became more violent with his participation in the peasants' revolt of March 1907. As noted by critic Ion Roman, in his series of poems, retaken by Gazeta Țăranilor between 1906 and February 1907, Vissarion "dared to prophesy, and in some ways even stoke", these revolutionary events. He also expressed this radicalism in a poem he sent to the mainstream daily Universul, which was read by the authorities; Vissarion himself believes that he was detested for his pieces in Hazul Satelor, which, though pseudonymous, were easily attributable to him. An account by eyewitness Stan G. Perșinaru suggests that Vissarion was caught while recruiting thousands of peasants for an attack on Titu train station; Perșinaru also claims to have seen Vissarion captured and escorted by a cavalry guard. Other reports of the train-station attack have it that was leading thousands of rebels, picked out from Răzvad and other neighboring localities. Investigators added claims that he had used his talents as a chemist to fabricate homemade bombs.

Vissarion was subsequently sent to a prison center in Târgoviște, where he allegedly wrote poems on the walls of his cell. Reportedly beaten into submission by his captors, he was then sentenced to death, but freed upon the intervention of a political friend, Ion G. Duca. He and Duca had met at a public rally. His unexpected survival made him feared and respected by other peasants, who already viewed him as a witch doctor. After his release, they also began calling him Copilul întunericului ("Child of darkness"). Upon returning home, he embarked on a series of experiments which combined aeronautics and a study of energy procurement, with "giant kites" that were meant to trap energy. Scholar Ion Rotaru notes that Vissarion "amazed—and sometimes annoyed—his fellow villagers with his oddities."

The events of 1907 inspired Vissarion to write Epilogul răscoalei ("An Epilogue to the Revolt"), which appeared in 1910 in a socialist newspaper, România Muncitoare. Depicting the botched execution of two peasant leaders (and making a statement about the brutality of repression), it was part of a planned, but never completed, novel called Răsculații ("The Rebels"); overall, it had the "authenticity of a procès-verbal". He was co-opted by Adevărul daily, with articles that challenged the practice of governing villages through Gendarmerie terror; the same notion was expressed in his novella of the time, called Mîrlanii ("The Boors"). Aligned with socialism during that stage of his life and possibly witnessing speeches by left-wing agitators at Sotir, Vissarion also published another work, the sketch story Fără pâine ("No Bread"), in a 1912 issue of România Muncitoare. This contribution was followed by a "four-act social play", Lupii ("The Wolves"), completed in 1912 and also featured, with a noticeable delay, in that same paper. Theatrical historian Ionuț Niculescu criticizes the contribution for its "linear action", but praises it for being "somber and authentic", in contrast to "idylls" by Ioan Alexandru Brătescu-Voinești and I. I. Mironescu. It depicts peasants in a fictional village being pushed into extreme poverty and then violence against the eponymous "wolves" (landowners and notabilities).

According to scholar Rodica Pandele, Vissarion, Caragiale and Vlahuță are the only three writers of note ever to contribute for the România Muncitoare supplement, Lumea Nouă—which also hosted some of Vissarion's verse. Ion Pas, who edited România Muncitoare alongside Panait Istrati, was enthusiastic about the Vissarion contributions, calling them "convincing documents regarding the sufferings of peasant slaves". He was less impressed by the real-life Vissarion, whom he met at Sotir Hall: "dressed as neither a plowman nor a townsfolk", he seemed dazzled and always searching for Istrati (whose name he could never remember), to whom he presented his manuscripts, which he measured by the pound; Vissarion did not seem to catch Istrati's drift that the socialists had no financial means to publish all his production. Pas also contends that Vissarion "never quite toiled with the plow", since his past was in the administration, and since he was doing odd jobs as a railway porter in Titu.

Istrati took an even dimmer view of Vissarion, whom he chided in an issue of România Muncitoare. According to Istrati, the socialist peers would not have published more of Vissarion's work even if they had the funds. He regarded Vissarion as an infiltrator in line with the right-wing traditionalism espoused by the Sămănătorul group and "not at all an author-peasant." Vissarion was also an atheist and self-proclaimed Freethinker inspired by Francisco Ferrer. He was therefore well-liked by Ion Dic Dicescu, leader of the atheistic undercurrent within Romanian socialism, and began writing for Dicescu's Rațiunea; as reported by Pas, his writings there still had to be polished for their many language mistakes.

=== Meeting Arghezi ===
Resuming work in the civil service, Vissarion was a health inspector in 1907–1908, 1913 and 1919, and a school inspector in 1920. For the remainder of his life, he lived in Costeștii din Vale, dedicating himself to works of rural welfare. These often included his inventions as a "self-taught scientist", such as several wind- and water-powered engines. He was a dedicated student of lift, starting with direct observations of bird flight and anatomy, claiming to have discovered a universal law of "maximum movement [obtained] with minimal matter and minimal effort". He reportedly broke a leg when he tried to fly one of his gliders from his rooftop—the local priest had unwittingly saved his life by not allowing him to glide down from the church steeple. In a July 1911 conversation with Dicescu, Vissarion described his work on ultralight aviation—complaining that he was completely unsupported by the state, and could only gather some donations from the Cămărășescu family. In August, he designed an airplane (or quasi-helicopter), and obtained a patent for it, leading him to claim that he had defeated in this a professional aviator, Aurel Vlaicu. Aerospace engineer Valeriu Avram notes that the contribution was legitimate, with "extremely ingenious solutions" such as a special kind of blade pitch. Vissarion later held several patents for other inventions, including ventilated shoes and a wheelchair.

In the meantime, Vissarion managed to penetrate Bucharest's literary life, attracting attention from writers and critics who were seeking authentic peasant voices and who viewed him as an "exceptional 'peasant raconteur'"; according to Pas, this was after Brătescu-Voinești had read his memoir of an encounter with Delavrancea in România Muncitoare, and chanced upon the author while waiting for his train in Costeștii din Vale. Brătescu handled his peasant colleague's promotion for a while, insisting that other Romanian intellectuals also read his manuscripts. Pas also contends that Vissarion happened to fill the intellectuals' longing for a new Ion Creangă, who would embody their vision of peasant literature—Vissarion was discovered right after I. Dragoslav, whom he came to replace as the elite's favorite peasant. Admitted into the Romanian Writers' Society (SSR), Vissarion was disputed between Sămănătorul traditionalists, including Nicolae Iorga, and the more left-wing Poporanists, beginning with Garabet Ibrăileanu. According to cultural sociologist Zigu Ornea, he belonged mainly to the former school, helping to prolong its echoes into the interwar.

Critic Ovidiu Papadima argues that the socialist episode "brought a diminishing of his raconteur's talent", pushing Vissarion to attempt an adaptation to modern forms of writing. He was well received by the Symbolist movement, and especially so by poets Tudor Arghezi and Ion Vinea. Though committed to aestheticism, both of them appreciated him for his "anti-bourgeois" credentials, in line with the larger phenomenon of social realism. Vissarion's fiction appeared in Constantin Banu's Flacăra and in Ibrăileanu's Viața Romînească, where he was introduced by Gala Galaction. In 1913, he was an editor at Rampa and Facla; in 1911, he completed an autobiographical play, Un vis ciudat ("A Strange Dream"), which he never printed.

Vissarion now published his short stories in several volumes: Nevestele lui Moș Dorogan ("Old Man Dorogan's Wives", 1913), Florica și alte nuvele ("Florica and Other Novellas", 1916), and Privighetoarea neagră ("The Black Nightingale", also 1916). Ethnographer Pompiliu Pîrvescu reads Dorogan as a "people's Don Juan, enamored with freedom and beauty, irresistible, libertine, and detestable." Nevestele..., which elaborates on the topic of free love, was much liked by more cultured authors of the day, including Brătescu-Voinești and Galaction, but disliked by Papadima, who found it "sugary, when not entirely vulgar". Papadima contrasts this narrative with another one of Vissarion's stories, Șperaclul ("The Master Key")—a sample of his "impressive writing", detailing the ethical conundrums faced by a regular soldier in his attempts to respect his captain's whims. Upon its publication, Privighetoarea neagră was welcomed by columnist Spiru Hasnaș as a sample of literature by "the most spontaneous, most primitive voice of folk inspiration [...], even when his writing produces pages of much roughness or prolix sketches." The latter concern was voiced by Viața Romînească's editor, George Topîrceanu, who, in November 1915, delayed publication of a story by Vissarion because it did not use natural speech.

=== World War I activities ===
In September–October 1916, immediately after Romania's entry into World War I, Vissarion was drafted into the Romanian Army. He spent some time tending to the stables of the Veterinary School, but obtained to be transferred after numerous letters of protest to his commanders. He was then allowed to work as a military censor, directly supervised by critic Eugen Lovinescu. According to the latter, Vissarion was at the time in pain from a dental infection, but would not agree to have his tooth removed by the "Jewish" doctors, whom he regarded with a dose of suspicion. Vissarion witnessed first-hand the occupation of southern Romania by the Central Powers, which became the main subject of his quasi-diary, Sub călcâi ("Under the Heel"). By then, he had returned to civilian life as a schoolteacher, and had one of his stories, called Zapis împăratul ("Emperor Pledge"), serialized by a children's magazine.

The late stages of the war saw Vissarion writing for some "Germanophile" gazettes—namely, those put out by publicists who believed that the Central Powers would win the war; these included Libertatea, Lumina, and Arghezi's Cronica. Lumina included his prose as a feuilleton for a while after the Romanian surreder to the Central Powers. In September–October 1918, just before the German Armistice, he was working with Galaction and Arghezi on the two issues of Spicul bi-monthly, which had an agrarianist agenda and "cultivate[d] religious sentiment." Vissarion, Galaction, George Bacovia and Vasile Demetrius were additionally published by the pacifist-Germanophile journal Cronica Moldovei, of Bârlad.

Also in 1918, Vissarion was awarded the Romanian Academy's Adamachi Prize for Florica și alte nuvele, returning in 1920 with two other volumes, Maria de altădată ("Yesteryear's Maria") and Ber-Căciulă, the latter of which established Vissarion's reputation as Romania's first-ever science fantasy writer, drawing comparisons with Jules Verne's The Begum's Fortune and with tales by Pavel Bazhov. Its distinctive note depicted the distant future cityscapes with "the amusing approximations of an archaic, almost folkloric, language." According to Vissarion himself, he had been pushed to write "all-new fairy tales" by a chance remark from sociologist Dimitrie Gusti. He tested his storytelling techniques on a juvenile audience, at Costeștii de Vale or at a vacation spot in Eforie. According to Lovinescu, he could carry on for hours on end, improvising from spontaneous imagination.

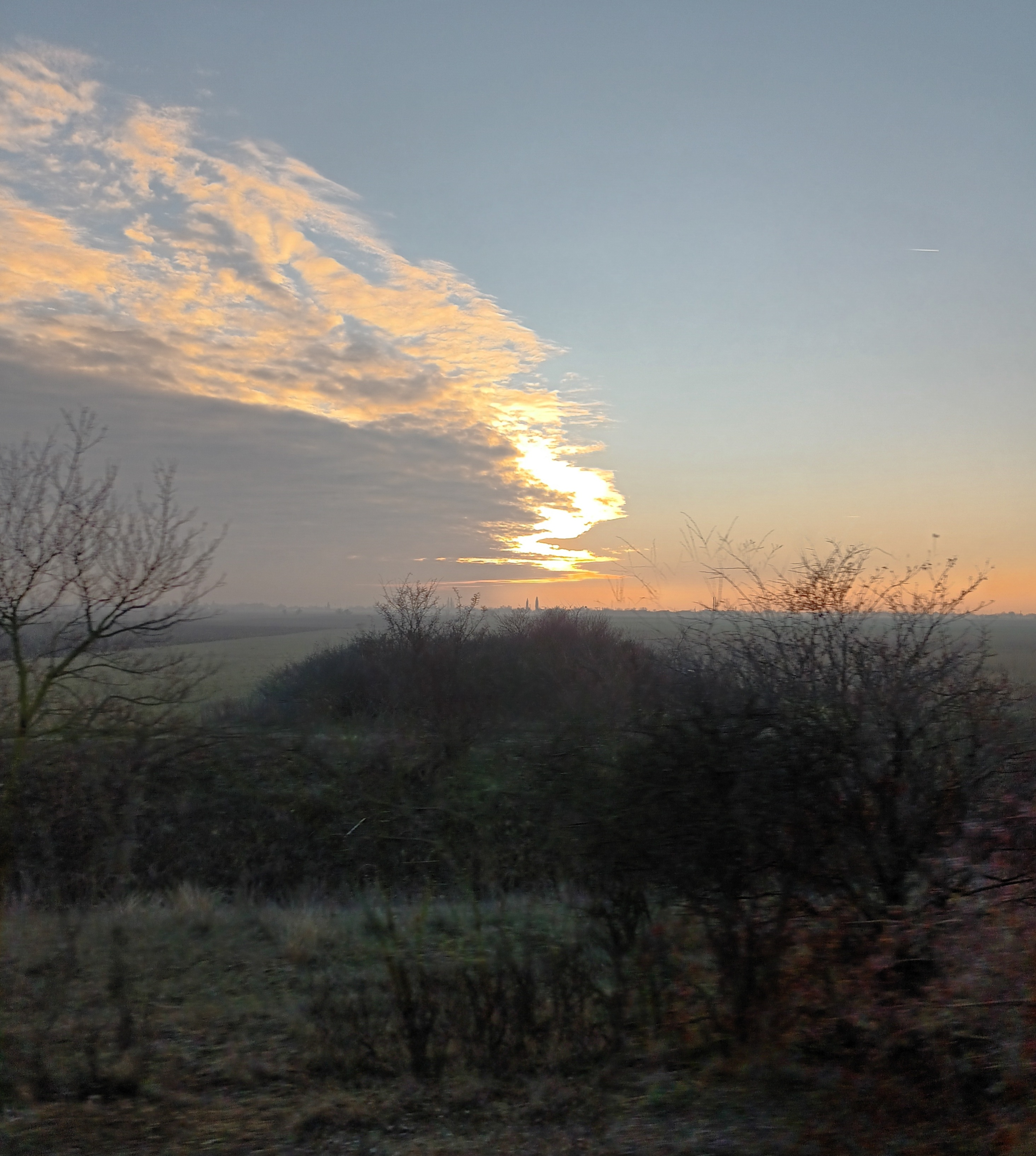
Landscape of Vissarion's native Dâmbovița County: sunset over the shrubland in Răcari

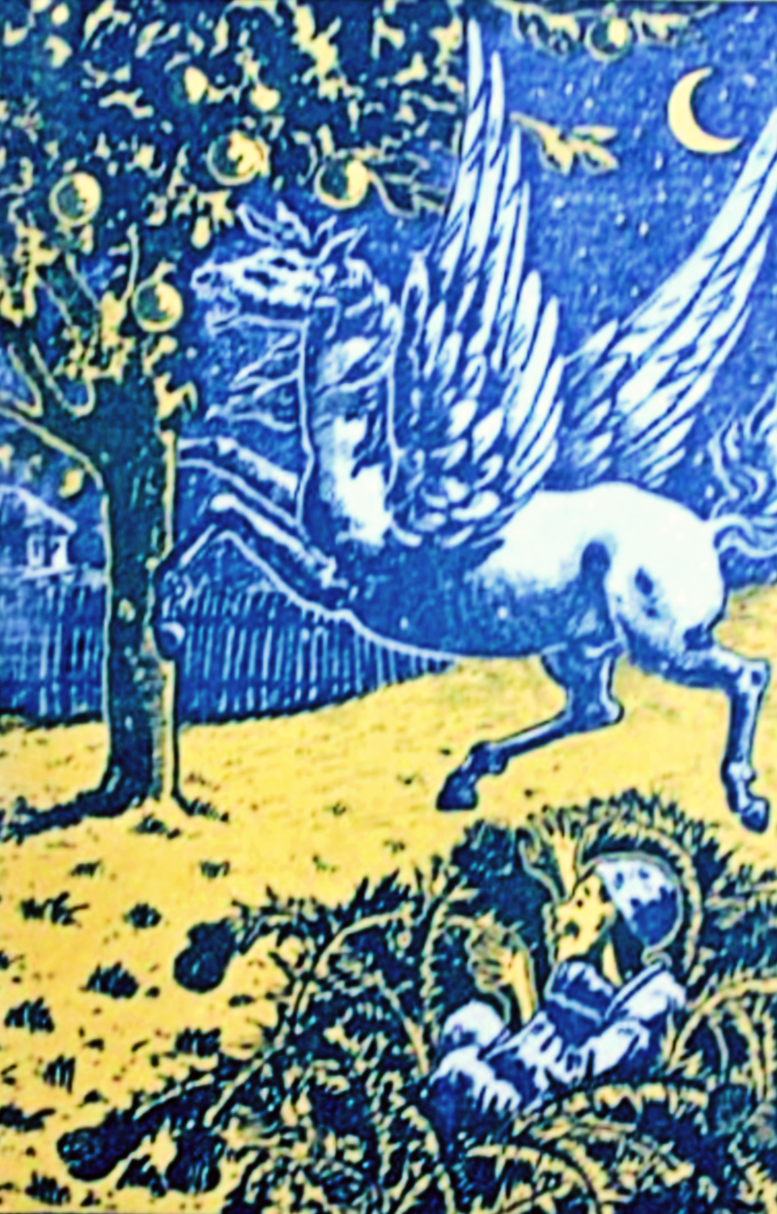
Cover illustration for the first edition of Ber-Căciulă (1920)

Despite his relative success, Vissarion complained about financial trouble after the Răstoaca had flooded his agricultural plots. He asked Alexandru Vlahuță for money, noting that, between his delayed pay as a schoolteacher and his on-and-off collaboration on magazines, he was still unable to feed his family. He was also writing about his work in chemistry to the academic Constantin Istrati, who was "slightly annoyed", convinced "that [Vissarion] only wrote because he had too much time on his hands." Vissarion tried to intervene in favor of Galaction, who was being pushed out of his government job upon revelations about his high profile in the Germanophile press. During early 1919, he used his friendship with Duca (with whom he "travels 3–4 times a month by car") to seek clemency for Galaction, but his efforts were unsuccessful.

=== Early interwar ===
Vissarion himself was turning more right-wing, emerging as an associate of Duca's National Liberal Party (PNL). Shortly after the union of 1918, the authorities sent him into Bessarabia, where he was to preach anti-communism to the local peasants. This mission, which Vissarion described in an article for Dimineața, was registered as a betrayal by the Socialist Party of Romania, whose press rated him an agent of "the Romanian oligarchic regime." The group also dismissed his newer literary works as stereotypical (with "peasants as cheerful types, always ready to crack a joke or two"), as well as "chauvinistic" and "antisemitic". Vissarion remained a right-winger in later years, appearing at the PNL's March 1923 rally in Găești.

Writing in October 1919, Galaction declared Vissarion as the "strong peasant artist" Romanians had been looking for—a verdict described as highly exaggerated by literary scholar Șerban Cioculescu. The 300-page Petre Pârcălabul ("Petre the Burgrave"), appeared in early 1920, but was dated 1921. Set in 1839 Wallachia, it intertwined a romance novel (concluding that men are naturally polygamous) into a historical narrative with appearances by Hajduk Radu Anghel and court poet Iancu Văcărescu. Pîrvescu gave the work a mixed review—he disliked the "deluge of gibberish" in parts of the novel, and criticized Vissarion for making his characters speak "like today's lawyers." He encouraged Vissarion to continue writing in the genre and refine his craft. Patria newspaper called Petre Pârcălabul a quasi-reportage, "written in great haste", adding that its subject matter was entirely "banal".

Vrăjitoarea ("The Witch"), appearing in 1921, was followed in 1924 by Cântecele lui Iancu ("Songs of Iancu") and Islaz ieftin ("Cheap Commons"), and in 1928 by a sequel, Ber-Căciulă Împărat ("Ber-Căciulă as Emperor"). The latter's eponymous hero is a monarch and inventor of social-improvement devices, which allow him to establish a flourishing experiment in utopian socialism. In the book's first print, the cover illustration showed Vissarion's flying machine. While Cântecele lui Iancu, comprising erotic verse, was panned by reviewers as "prosaic and tasteless", a prose work, titled Corvin, won Vissarion the SSR award for 1929. Only the first installments of Sub călcâi appeared as a volume in 1922, with other fragments put out by various magazines over the next decade.

=== Cinema and Lumea cealaltă ===
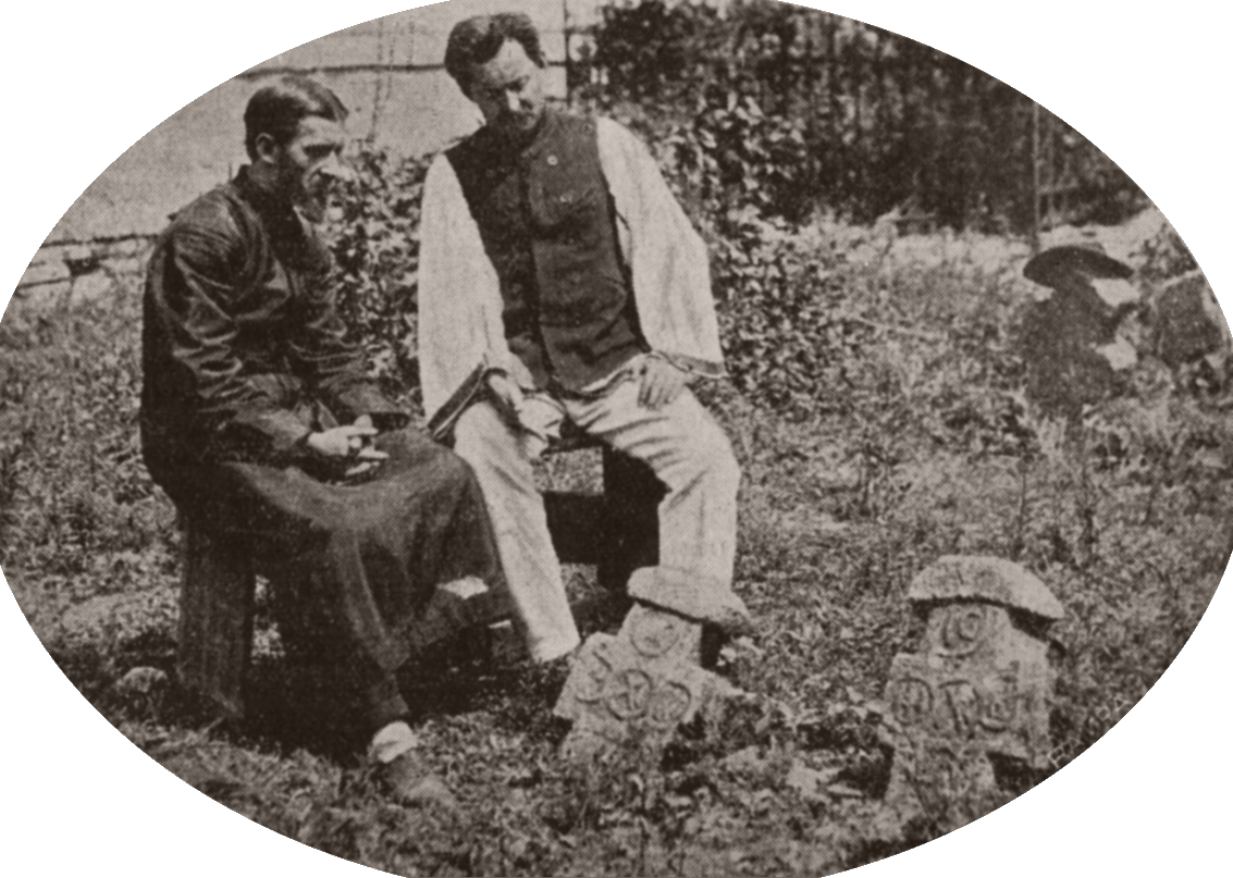
Vissarion (on the right, in folk attire) and actor Milian Șerbănescu in a still from Legenda celor două cruci, discussing the eponymous two crosses of Costeștii din Vale (August 1925)

In July 1925, Vissarion announced that he had turned one of his stories into a screenplay and would star in the leading role in its production. The film was, in fact, Legenda celor două cruci ("A Legend of Two Crosses"), and appeared that November, with Vissarion as "The Narrator". Directed by Eftimie Vasilescu and with Țuchi Eremia in the lead role, it retold a legend from Costeștii din Vale, localized during the era of John Caradja (c. 1812–1818). Most of the extras were peasants from Băneasa, who displayed genuine shock at an execution scene that they believed to be real—this authenticity contributed to the film's success. Another new medium explored by Vissarion was that of the airwaves. He debuted for Radio Bucharest on 7 October 1929, with an address to peasant listeners. He was techno-optimistic, announcing that the future belonged to "radiovision", with "rays seen and unseen by our eyes" connecting devices which "through which we may all see each other." In 1930, he presented Henry Ford with his design for a seed drill, inviting him to invest in its commercialization; the response he received was negative.

In the early 1930s, Liviu Rebreanu was studying Lupii as part of the documentation for a 1907-themed novel, Răscoala. Aesthetically, Rebreanu found the play to be "astonishingly bad" and was therefore persuaded not to approach a project in dramatic form; however, he also described Vissarion as "lovable" for his storytelling. During those years, Vissarion applied himself to mystical investigations. In 1929, he produced Lumea cealaltă ("The Netherworld"), followed in 1935 by Învietorul de morți ("Raiser of the Dead")—the latter was published as part of a special peasants' collection by the Royal Foundations, with prints by Aurel Jiquidi.

Lumea cealaltă was essentially an interpretation of "every dream that he ever had", sketching out Vissarion's own ghostlore and eschatology. Reviewing the volume for Adevărul, Doctor Ygrec suggested that its actual worth was in unwittingly mapping out the "entire subconscious side of Romanian peasant spirituality", for whom "the fantastic characters appearing in dreams provide urges, give commands, and furnish advice that everyone then follows." Vissarion was at the time writing down "notebooks of his own dreams, his family's, his fellow villagers', in what was a sustained attempt to find a link between this world and 'the next'". He had conversations with the occultist C. Nicolau, in which he talked about his belief in the deterministic power of suggestion, strong wishes, and curses, arguing that these had the power of altering biology and anatomy. Vissarion had rediscovered his monotheistic faith, writing: "In the general plane of my existence there is a primordial idea—[help] from God and myself, first and foremost, and only then help from any others."

=== Sburătorul and Steluța ===
In the early 1920s, Vissarion was welcomed by critic Lovinescu as an "ethnic exponent" who "melted into the anonymous mass of the people", his talent being doubled by an "inexhaustible memory". He included some works by Vissarion in issues of his review, Sburătorul. Vissarion was a regular at the eponymous literary circle, appearing to other attendees as "always sweaty and his hair all ruffled up". As recounted by Rotaru, he made a point of distributing his works to any potential publishers, and pestered Lovinescu, "who had the saintly patience of listening to him reading his works at length, giving him guidance, sometimes with good effects, toward writing objective, observational prose". This influence, Rotaru argues, made Vissarion a "modest forerunner of Marin Preda." Another critic, George Călinescu, primarily saw Vissarion as defined by his continuous "tall tale" (gasconism). The novelist resented such claims, assuring his readers that he "never lied, not in any one of my writings."

From May 1932 to April 1933, Vissarion edited Steluța ("Little Star") magazine, with contributions from Galaction, Vasile Militaru, and Al. T. Stamatiad. Vissarion did most of the writing, publicizing his pacifism (and his belief that a European war was in the making), his trust in legality, and his plea for morality in science. He refrained from publishing modernist authors, announcing that the magazine's aesthetics were shaped by Stamatiad and Mihai Eminescu, as well as, partly, by Nichifor Crainic and Victor Eftimiu; in its review of Steluța, Facla described its literature as "clean [and] lively". Stricken by poverty around 1935, Vissarion could not publish most of his literary works, though he continued to write regularly. He earned some backing from poet Octavian Goga, who unsuccessfully proposed that the Ministry of Education purchase his entire corpus of works and distribute them as school prizes for gifted students. Though he is said to have outsold any other writer during a May 1936 show at Cartea Românească of Bucharest (having cycled there from Dâmbovița), he openly complained that Goga's secretary, Dumitru Ciurezu, was actively undermining him, and preventing him from even exhibiting his books.

Vissarion's other contributions were mostly scattered, appearing in Revista Fundațiilor Regale or Adevărul Literar și Artistic. He printed two more volumes in 1937, as Ghiță Cătănuță ("Little Soldier Ghiță") and Ochi negri ("Black Eyes"). These were two variants of a historical play about battles between Romanians and Arnauts, claiming to show that the former were a very ancient and naturally defensive people. Fragments of the expanding text, which Vissarion considered as the nucleus of a novel, also appeared in the magazines Graiul Dâmboviței and Țărănismul. As he confessed in an autobiographical piece published by the former that same year, he now preferred provincial journals, as these were not read by "moneyed magnates". As such, he was free to elaborate on his economic and scientific views, expressing his concern about oil depletion and his proposals to harness wave power. He involved himself in political debates, as a Romanian nationalist: in November 1933, he appeared as a guest at the Iron Guard festival in Bucureștii Noi, hearing a speech by Corneliu Zelea Codreanu; in June 1934, Curentul daily hosted his musings on the "invasion" of foreigners, in particular Jews, blaming their ascendancy on the National Peasants' Party. He proposed "integral nationalism" as the remedy, offering Italian fascism and Nazism as models to be "adopted"; Vissarion also called for dismantling great factories in favor of the cottage industry.

Describing himself as "thrifty and without a single vice", Vissarion had stored revenue from his literary activity toward buying gravel bars on the Argeș and had used them to set up his own coppice. Literary historian Ștefan Ion Ghilimescu notes that the "naughty peasant writer" was, in fact, an important landowner and gamekeeper, with estates covering parts of Costeștii din Vale, Zăvoiu Orbului, and Puțu cu Salcie. It was on one of these plots that his sons Grigore and Garibaldi hunted down a rabid wolf in April 1937—an event that made the national news. Vissarion Sr had more free time on his hands—as reported by his youngest son Octav, he "spent most of his time in his room, reading"; often, while "waiting for his muse", he also played the jaw harp. However, he still presented himself to the outside world as a destitute man. In September 1937, the Iron Guard's Mircea Streinul informed his readers that Vissarion was "a great storyteller", but that he was subject to "a revolting boycott" by "the kikes".

=== World War II regimes ===
In 1938, Carol II suspended democracy through a self-coup. In January of the following year, Vissarion joined the monarch's own National Renaissance Front, within a mass recruitment of SSR cadres. By the end of 1939, he was engaged in furious correspondence with his Cartea Românească publishers, accusing them of having hidden the best-selling status of his novels and taking steps to reduce his profit margin. One of the letters ended in a curse: "What am I left with other than [...] to address myself to a God I'm sure you don't believe in, and say: may they never again see their children at the table, may their line extinguish itself before they do". He received much support from Arghezi, who wanted to put out new editions of Privighetoarea neagră and Ber-Căciulă from his printing press at Mărțișor. He visited there his new patron, who was bedridden with a disease that seemed to be a medical mystery; he prayed for Arghezi, who declared himself healed as a result. Vissarion spoke to his mentor about his own dreams, which included philosophical revelations about reincarnation—he claimed to have had memories of his past life as a priest. As recounted by Arghezi's son Baruțu, when detailing such claims, Vissarion unwittingly produced "truly literary accounts, of an unmatched beauty".

Usually a guest of the Arghezis whenever in Bucharest, at some point during World War II he welcomed Baruțu and his sister Mitzura in Costeștii din Vale. She recalls that he was consciously acting as a healer to his peasants "from villages all around the place", using "herbs and powders that he had prepared in glazed jugs". Vissarion published a new science fantasy work in 1939, as Agerul Pământului ("Earth's Agility")—noted for combining the "traditional conflicts of folk fairy tales" into a futuristic setting. It is named after a secondary character, a 200-stânjeni-tall humanoid who assists Prince Floreal in ridding Earth of the Zmei; the latter have captured portions of humanity, which they keep as prisoners in a state of cryptobiosis. The work is largely an homage to those scientists whose work "serves a greater good" by driving humanity toward the "peaks of civilization"—it also includes Vissarion's explicit desire for "peace and brotherhood among men, peace as obtained by providing humans with all the food they need, and with anything else they may require."

At the height of war, Vissarion's diaries continued to focus on the antiquity of the Romanian people and its future of prosperity; they also lash out at his contemporaries for having "reduced [him] to nothing", and explain that though once tempted by politics, he had always detested politicians for "living the good life at the masses' expense." In 1942, the National Theater Bucharest's production committee heard readings from Ochi negri, but the play was ultimately not picked up. At the time, Ion Antonescu's dictatorial regime consulted Tudor Arghezi for its project regarding propaganda films; Arghezi recommended that Vissarion, a "folk and folkloristic author in good standing", be used as a screenwriter. However, this was just a few months before Arghezi's critique of Antonescu's alliance with Nazi Germany, which resulted in his being interned.

In June 1943, as Ber-Căciulă had reached its fourth edition, Acțiunea columnist Vasile Damaschin paid homage to Vissarion as "one of the most talented children's raconteurs", crediting him with having "shaped the aesthetic sense of our tiniest readers." Vissarion's final contributions include a 1943 tract, Energie mecanică în lumea în care ne găsim ("Mechanic Energy for This World We Now Inhabit"), comprising his original designs for motors, pumps, watermills, and boats. At the time, Vissarion was also considering fitting bathhouses with energy converters, hoping to turn "mechanic energy" as produced by the movement of bathwater into heat and electricity for public consumption. Few copies have survived, largely because the publisher's storage room was destroyed in an air raid. Ahead of the general election in 1946, Vissarion appeared in public as a backer of the left-wing National Democratic Front. He also made stops in Găești, helping to set up a literary circle named after Ion Stancu, a local hero of the Romanian Communist Party.

=== Final years and death ===
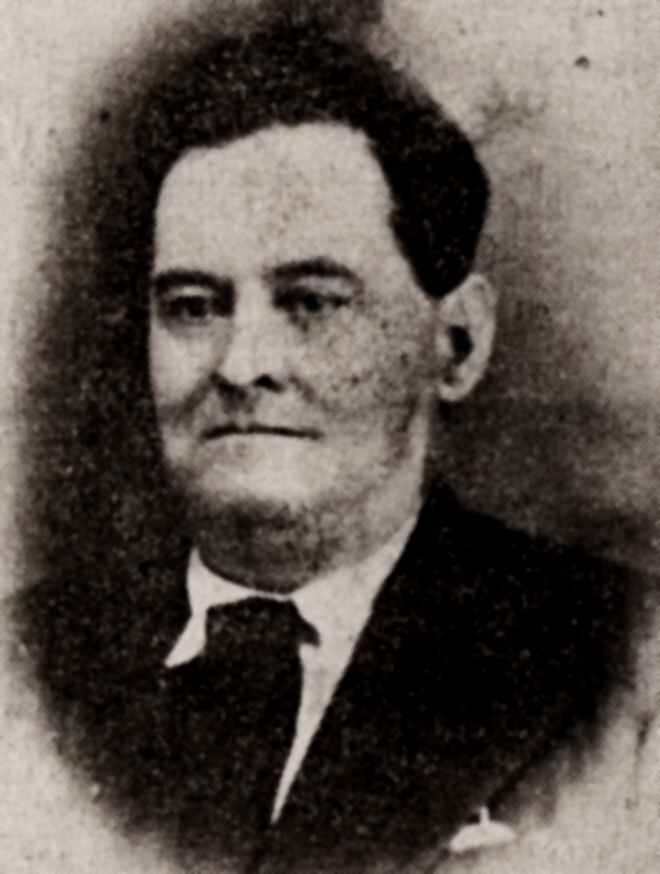
Vissarion in old age

At home, Vissarion received the cartoonist Valentin Vasiliu, who did his portrait in tempera (Vissarion used the occasion to show off portraits of his done by others, including Neagu Rădulescu). A local tradition claims that, in early 1948, he welcomed the celebrated author Camil Petrescu on his estate; according to Ghilimescu, this visit may have familiarized Petrescu with the landscape, which is depicted in his historical novel Un om între oameni. Vissarion spent autumn 1947 burning down some of his books on a large pyre, which resulted in the definitive destruction of "a large portion of his manuscripts". Scholar Florin Manolescu believes that this decision was taken "in a moment of annoyance" when Vissarion felt overcome by a "sense of failure".

According to Niculescu, Lupii was largely ignored by the public upon its release, but was reclaimed by the communist regime after 1948; a reprint appeared in 1957, with a foreword by Mihai Gafița. A total recovery of Vissarion's work was hampered by its ideological context. He was subjected to criticism by the socialist realist establishment: in an April 1948 issue of Contemporanul, Al. I. Ștefănescu reported that "Visarion" was a man of "no literary contours", whose Învietorul de morți had served the "bourgeois-landowning regime" by depicting peasants as "stupid". In late 1949, literary chronicler Petru Comarnescu informed the public that Vissarion was working on novellas which integrated within a communist-led "struggle against superstitions". In 1957, while recommending that Lupii be reread, Roman noted: "His writing is a mixture of frowning and humor, of enlightened thought and naivete, of trust in one's intellectual prowess and scandalous mystical kowtowing in front of existential mysteries."

Around 1950, Vissarion was repeatedly visiting Târgoviște and having long conversations with the physics professor at Văcărescu High School; one student spotted him sitting alone and pensive on the top floor of Chindia Tower. He was primarily dedicated to new projects in science, visualizing a "floating palace" made from Plexiglas, which could have supported its weight while in the Earth's orbit. By August 1951, the writer had been stricken down with a debilitating disease, which gave him fainting spells and made him look "skin and bones". He was also troubled by the notion of dying, writing: "I don't quite get this mechanism of life-and-death. How? You live for 60—70—80 years, and then you die! And then be dead, not just for as long as that, but for thousands and billions upon billions of years! Why then this flicker [emphasis in the original] of life I was given". In a letter of 1 October, Arghezi urged Vissarion to pick up his strength and "get up", assuring him that he had him in his prayers. According to Crăciun, when Vissarion died on 5 November, it was "with a firm conviction in the extraordinary powers of science [...], reassured that the things written down in his fairy tales would one day come true."

== Legacy ==
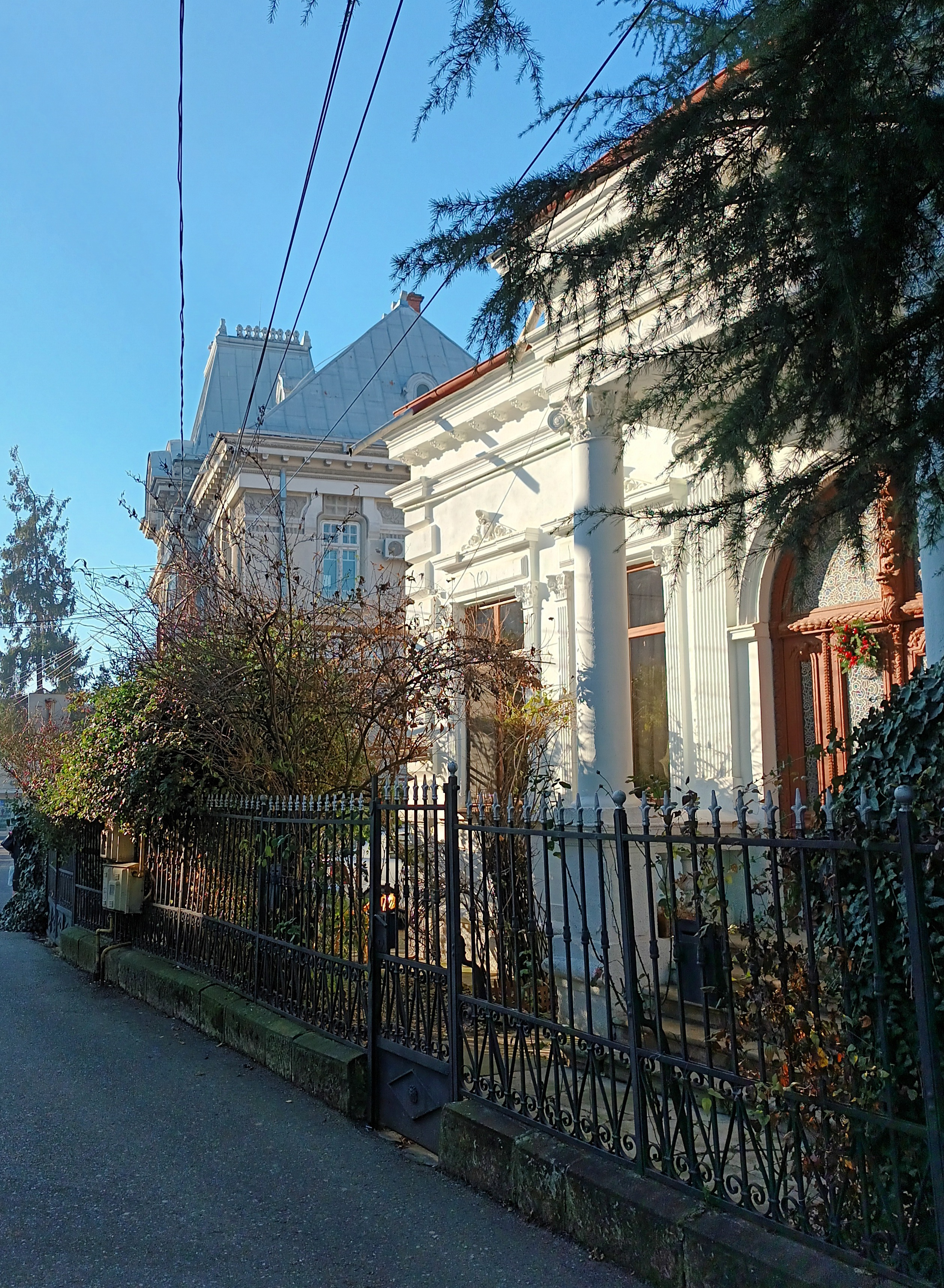
View of Ion C. Vissarion Street, downtown Târgoviște

Writing in 1962, critic Valeriu Râpeanu asked editors to reconsider their priorities, noting that a "rather meek" Vissarion had been "persistently" republished; in contrast, more important figures were still waiting for the same treatment. Arghezi, as his "lifelong friend", spoke on Radio Bucharest to raise awareness about Vissarion's yet-unpublished manuscripts, preserved in Costeștii din Vale. Cioculescu described Arghezi's obituary as not doing justice to the recipient: it introduced Vissarion as a "calligrapher" rather than an actual writer, while also mysteriously calling him a "true man of science". Moreover, Arghezi used the occasion to discuss peasant myths about the afterlife and ghosts and mistakenly attributed beliefs found in Argeș County to Vissarion's native Dâmbovița. This was partly because Arghezi believed that Vissarion was a native of Costeștii de Argeș (the same erroneous claim appears in Pas' recollections). Cioculescu also provided notes on his casual meetings with Vissarion during a period when both were living in Dâmbovița, but later acknowledged that some of these were samples of false memory.

By 1971, the Vissarion family numbered 90 "direct and collateral descendants". Noted examples include Voltaire Vissarion, a Lieutenant Colonel in the Romanian Air Force, daughter Cornelia Vissarion-Mănuceanu, who was Arghezi's personal secretary from 1954, and another daughter, Florența, employed by the sanatorium in Titu; a granddaughter, Sorina Vissarion, participated in commemorations of her grandfather beginning while she was still a student. Later in life, she handled many literary works and letters he had left. Iancu Vissarion's unpublished works include, in addition to Un vis ciudat, a "vast novel" of autofictional notations, called Cartea omului neînțeles ("The Book of a Misunderstood Man"), a large body of novellas, collectively known as Nina, a dramatization of Ber-Căciulă, as well as some fairy tales and a corpus of recollections from his life as a writer. Also included are non-patented inventions such as a "cold engine", a radio communication station, a rotating piston, and new methods in industrial soapmaking. One count suggests that there were as many as 5,000 pages of "profoundly unequal" handwritten material left in the village home. They were reviewed by Crăciun, who found them to be a "titanic labor" showcasing Vissarion's leading traits: "optimism, love for his country and of his fellow men." Also according to Crăciun, Vissarion was a writer who completed a Muntenian school of folk writing that had begun in the early 19th century with Anton Pann.

In 1963, author Mihu Dragomir discussed the need of reprinting Vissarion's contribution to Romanian science fiction, alongside similar works by Felix Aderca, Alexandru Macedonski, Cezar Petrescu, and Henri Stahl. Two years later, Agerul Pământului was serialized in Romania's popular science magazine, Știință și Tehnică; in 1969, Agerul was included in an anthology by Ion Hobana. Also in 1965, Arghezi spoke at the Writers' Union of Romania, censuring his colleagues there for having allowed oblivion to settle on a "talented peasant writer". The following year, he protested that no memorial plaque had been fashioned to honor "this Tolstoy of the Romanians". Crăciun organized a 1967 commemoration of Vissarion in Costeștii din Vale, where actors read out fragments from the works to the locals, including some who had been Vissarion's friends, and who were moved to tears. In September, Urzica magazine reprinted Învietorul de morți, with a note which assessed that, his gifts "pulverized in many directions", Vissarion had missed out on producing great literature; instead, Urzica proposed that he had reached his glory as a humorist. That same year, a Vissarion Literary Circle was functioning in Găești, while the Vissarion family house was rearranged into a local museum. In 1971, it co-hosted the first-ever national poetry festival of high school students. By then, Ber-Căciulă had been reprinted in a children's edition at Editura Ion Creangă, which advertised it as introducing young readers to a "world of justice and truth".

Scholar Alexandru George sees Vissarion's cultural relevance in his ability to break with Sămănătorul traditionalism by offering a truer image of the Romanian peasant; he notes Vissarion's belonging to an "intermediary generation" of peasant or peasant-focused writers, including Gheorghe Brăescu, Nicolae Crevedia, Ion Iovescu, and Damian Stănoiu. Also, according to George, their contribution was largely discarded and ignored after the 1960s, when Marin Preda's novels introduced a new and even more realistic take on rural life. A belief that Preda had been inspired by Vissarion was voiced in the 1970s by literary critic Cornel Regman, whose verdict was in turn rejected by Henri Zalis. One of the authors who did credit Vissarion as an influence on their work is Marin Ioniță, himself a native of Dâmbovița. In 1978, Ioniță was inspired by Vissarion's experience of 1907 to write his children's novel Un șlep în derivă ("A Drifting Barge"). The main character, schoolteacher "Iancu Visalom", is subjected by the authorities to a psychological experiment, which verifies whether peasants are naturally treasonous; it fails when Visalom chooses self-sacrifice.

Publishing samples from Vissarion's diaries on his centennial in 1979, Crăciun referred to his subject as an "entirely unique figure in Romanian literature. His life is a spectacular adventure novel and his work, with its unique flavors, is situated between oral storytelling, the kind one finds among rhapsodes at peasant get-togethers, and a depiction of modern man's life, in the era of space flight." As part of the Cîntarea României festival, 1981 edition, Târgoviște's House of Culture performed a short play based on Vissarion's stories, but the dramatization itself was seen by critics as "failed". This effort was followed in 1983 by a collection of his selected works, curated by Crăciun and Viorica Florea for Editura Minerva. In 1982, after decades of working as a clerk, his daughter Cornelia escaped to West Germany, and found employment at Radio Free Europe; she debuted as a poet in 1986, thereafter acquiring fame as the author of anti-communist essays, in which she inserted recollections about her father and peasant life in general. Though still represented in 4th-year literature textbooks with the story Plăvanii ("The Hoary Ones"), by 2008 Vissarion Sr had joined the class of Romanian authors who "are unfortunately rarely read today".
