= Ion Hobana =

Romanian science fiction writer, critic and ufologist (1934–2011)

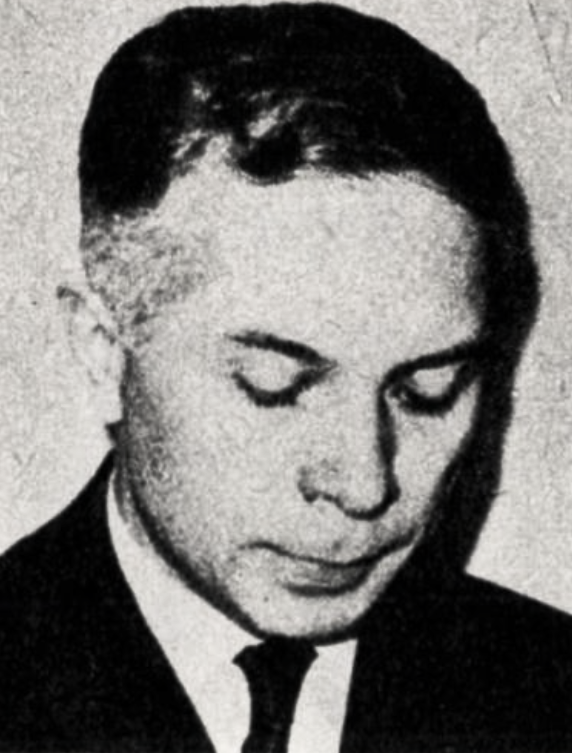
- Hobana in 1978
- Born: Aurelian Mantaroșie/Manta-Roșie; 25 January 1931; Sânnicolau Mare, Timiș-Torontal County, Kingdom of Romania
- Died: 22 February 2011 (aged 80); Bucharest, Romania
- Occupations: Journalist; editor; critic; translator; researcher; cultural manager; politician
- Writing career
- Period: 1938–2011
- Genres: Essay; biography; science fiction; children's literature; young adult fiction; spy fiction; detective fiction; historical novel; short story; sketch story; monograph; lyric poetry; epic poetry; autofiction; comics script; teleplay
- Movements: Socialist realism; Romanian science fiction; Didactic art

Ion Hobana, first name also Ioan, last name also Hobană (born Aurelian Mantaroșie or Manta-Roșie; 25 January 1931 – 22 February 2011) was a Romanian science fiction writer, literary critic and ufologist. His debut as a journalist, novelist and children's poet coincided with the early stages of Romanian communism, when he was also employed as an editor and translator; at that stage, Hobana adhered to Marxism-Leninism and socialist realism, which influenced his literary output. His participation in the local field of science fiction began in during his period studying at the University of Bucharest, when he produced a pioneering paper on the work of Jules Verne. It continued in the late 1950s, with stories which focused on describing futuristic technology in a terrestrial setting. By the early 1960s, Hobana was also a critic and theorist of science fiction, postulating that Romanian science-fiction culture was a byproduct of communism. He revisited the thesis later that decade, producing award-winning essays about pre-modern science fiction, Romanian as well as foreign. He was also involved on the scene as an anthologist and film critic.

In the mid-to-late 1960s, the new communist leader, Nicolae Ceaușescu, inaugurated a détente with the Western world. This policy allowed Hobana to set up a school of Romanian ufology; he also became internationally recognized as an authority on early science fiction, on Verne, on H. G. Wells, and more generally on comparative literature. He attended the Eurocons, at which he took two awards for separate achievements, and eventually became chair of the European Science Fiction Society. At home, Hobana continued with his work as a translator and raconteur, also writing and presenting shows for TVR 1—covering topics such as ufology and oneiromancy. He attained a mid-level position in the Romanian Communist Party, and spent 18 years as secretary of the Writers' Union. These activities had controversial aspects, including his participation in official censorship, targeting authors such as Paul Goma and Bujor Nedelcovici. Hobana was also engaged in promoting Ceaușescu's personality cult, and wrote homages to Ceaușescu's wife, Elena.

In the 1990s, after the Romanian Revolution had ended communism, Hobana became exposed to criticism for his past activities, though he continued to hold executive positions at the Writers' Union. Publishing new works of prose, including a World War II-themed novel, he returned to ufology with a monograph on the Roswell incident, leading a Romanian Agency for UFO Studies; he also contributed a national textbook of children's literature, and curated a series of science-fiction classics at Editura Minerva. His work suffered after 2009, when he was diagnosed with a terminal illness; he died in hospital less than a month after his 80th birthday, having managed to complete a critical overview of French science fiction.

== Early life and debut ==
The future Ion Hobana was born on 25 January 1934 at Sânnicolau Mare, Timiș-Torontal County, in what was then the Kingdom of Romania. He was officially known under his birth name, Aurelian Mantaroșie or Manta-Roșie. His parents were Ioan, a magistrate, and Antoaneta née Patrichi, who worked as a teacher. Despite their child being born in the extreme west of the country (in the Banat), the family hailed from the Moldavian city of Bârlad, where, in the 1920s, Ioan had published several issues of a magazine called Freamătul Literar. He had also founded a Bârlad literary club, named for Alexandru Vlahuță.

Aurelian attended a school in Alba Iulia (1937–1938), before continuing in Bârlad (1938–1938, 1941–1942). The latter city hosted his literary debut: in 1938, the local magazine Școlarii Tutoveni agreed to published stories and poems he had sent in. Later, the boy moved around Greater Romania, attending schools in Tighina (1942–1944), Râmnicu Vâlcea (1944–1946), and again Bârlad (1946–1949). Bârlad also hosted more of Aurelian's works, appearing in the local newspapers Păreri Tutovene and Lumina (1947). During his time at Gheorghe Roșca Codreanu High School, he was acquainted with several colleagues who were similarly active in literary life—Lucian Raicu, Dumitru Solomon, and C. D. Zeletin. By his own account, he had been attending a summer school of the Union of Communist Youth in Vălenii de Munte, and was writing agitprop verse. He was also attending various of Bârlad's literary clubs, including one headed by George Tutoveanu (to whom he would address one of his poems), he introduced his colleagues to works by Henric Sanielevici and Walt Whitman.

The young man took a diploma from the University of Bucharest Faculty of Letters after a one-year's course (1949–1950), being the first-ever Romanian to have submitted a final paper on a science-fiction-related subject. He later took his Ph.D. with a Verne-themed monograph, which was also unprecedented. According to literary critic Lucian Vasile Szabo, he was entering a "no man's land", at a time when "the genre itself was not entirely individualized." From 1948, Romania had been officially declared a people's republic, and enclosed within the Eastern Bloc. As noted in 2006 by critic and political scientist Ioan Stanomir, Hobana was "not at all innocent" in his subsequent commitment to the science fiction genre: in that context, its "shamanistic worship of technology" had a propaganda function, and closely imitated the Soviet models. Szabo contrarily argues that Hobana's main ideological guideline was his "humanism", producing a "literature of warning, one capable of instilling in humanity a care for its own survival". In a 1988 piece for Ramuri, Ioan Lascu proposed that modern Romanian science fiction, and therefore Hobana's stories as well, had "an engaged character, aiming for educational goals—the instilling of scientific knowledge, of atheistic convictions, and of peace as an ideal."

In 1950–1952, while having his contributions hosted by the magazine Flacăra of Bucharest, Hobana was employed as editor of the cultural page at Scînteia Tineretului, a central newspaper of the Communist Youth. His colleagues there included Nicolae Țic, who later recalled that Hobana was "well-read, meticulous, focusing on children's literature [but] dreaming of cosmic openings". His literary debut was in children's poetry, of which he produced five separate volumes, "rooted in the principles of socialist realism." He moved on from Scînteia Tineretului to the children's magazine Luminița, which had him as literary editor until 1956. Active within the Writers' Union of Romania (USR), in May 1956 Hobana performed self-criticism over his poetic output, citing new literary guidelines as published in the Soviet journal Kommunist. He praised other children's authors, including Vladimir Colin and Călin Gruia, for their modern fairy tales.

In July 1957, Știință și Tehnică magazine printed Hobana's first work of science fiction, Glasul mării ("Voice of the Sea"). It was panned by another author, Ovidiu Rîureanu, who argued that it was mainly a journalistic-style discussion about infrasounds, lacking "many of artistic literature's most crucial features." His full debut in young adult prose was with the story collection Ultimul văl ("The Last Veil"), appearing at Editura Tineretului in 1957. The title story was a mixture of spy and detective fiction, but in a futuristic setting—it described the adventures of a junior cameraman who uncovers a foreign plot against Romanian communism. In January 1960, the same imprint also put out his non-science-fiction novel, Sfîrșitul vacanței ("A Holiday's End"; second edition 1963). It was a World War II epic, dealing with youths that observe the "collapse of capitalist society" during the August 1944 coup. Sfîrșitul vacanței was read by Hobana's colleague Gheorghe Achiței as unequal, in that it failed to highlight the "leading role of the working class" within the resistance movement, presenting the latter's acts of sabotage as "mysterious". Hobana had translated and published (also in 1957) Sergey Mikhalkov's Uncle Styopa the Militsioner. He was for also a reviewer at Editura Tineretului, first in the early readers' section (1955–1961), and then in the new science-fiction department (to 1968). While there, he attended at least one party alongside the anti-communist poet Ion Vinea, though they never discussed politics.

In December 1963, the Communist-Party journal Lupta de Clasă hosted Hobana's overview of local science fiction, in which he embraced the (since-obsolete) claim that the genre only had a decade-long history locally—identifying it almost exclusively with a local almanac, Colecția de Povestiri Științifico-Fantastice. That same year, Hobana's own short stories had been collected as Oameni și stele ("Humans and Stars"), signalling his taking up of science fiction as a near-exclusive focus. In a companion to Romanian science fiction, Florin Manolescu observed that these writings were closely modeled on Verne and Hugo Gernsback's classics—focused on the advancements of human science, they had only very rare glimpses into speculative astrobiology (only one of them had aliens as characters).

== 1960s détente and international fame ==
Hobana followed up with the annotated anthology of translated texts Viitorul a început ieri ("The Future Has Begun Yesterday"), published in 1966. It is praised by Manolescu for having inaugurated a "consolidation and maturing of the genre". A selection of his own ventures in science-fiction criticism appeared, also at Editura Tineretului, in 1968, while he was working as science editor of Scînteia; it was titled Viitorul? Atenție! ("The Future? Beware!"). His essays therein were accompanied by samples from many other authors, including Kingsley Amis, Isaac Asimov, Roger Caillois, Silvian Iosifescu, Victor Kernbach, Stanisław Lem, and Pierre Versins. Also then, Editura Meridiane hosted his essays of film criticism (with a science-fiction focus), as Imaginile posibilului ("Glimpses of Possibilities"). In 1969, he published an anthology, Vîrsta de aur a anticipației românești ("The Golden Age of Romanian Science Fiction"); it won him the USR's annual prize. Contradicting his own 1963 thesis, Hobana now tackled Romanian contributions to the early history of science fiction, documenting the genre's evolution under the Symbolists' aegis, with detail on contributions made by Alexandru Macedonski and I. C. Vissarion, but also by Victor Anestin and by the typographic worker Alexandru Speranță. Internationally, this work received a Eurocon prize for essays.

Following Nicolae Ceaușescu's emergence as communist leader in the mid-1960s, Romania embraced cultural diversification, and, for a while, a détente with the Western world. This allowed Hobana to popularize his interest in ufology. In early 1968, the national broadcaster, TVR 1, gave exposure to his theories as part of Teleenciclopedia, a popular-science show for young viewers. This initiative was received with derision by journalist Felicia Antip of Flacăra, who noted that the program had turned to promoting pseudoscience. She also criticized Hobana's responses, which described ufology as the topic of interest by "many scientists, some of them esteemed", as an argument from authority. Hobana went on to establish, in 1971, a Scientific UFO Circle within the Bucharest University campus. As he recalled in 2010, the club had hundreds of attendees, and was never under any official pressure to dissolve itself. Also in 1971, he and his Belgian friend Julien Weverbergh put out a monograph titled: OZN – o sfidare pentru rațiunea umană ("UFO: A Challenge to Human Reason"). In addition to prefacing a series of science-fiction classics, Hobana also wrote introductions to Romanian translations of ancient-austronaut theory (Erich von Däniken, 1970) and ufology (J. Allen Hynek, 1978).

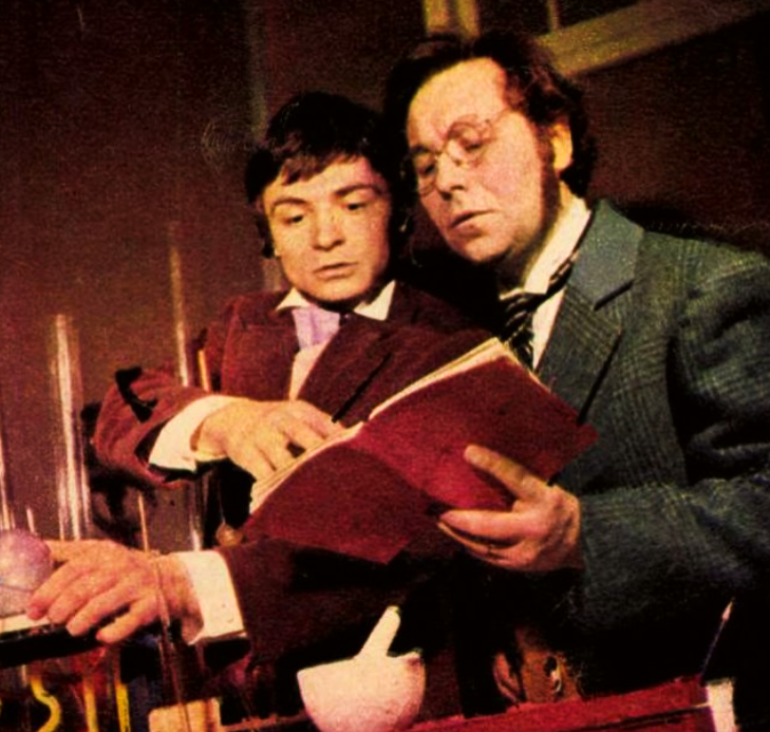
Lucian Muscurel (left, as Jack Griffin) and Ion Arcudeanu in Hobana's version of The Invisible Man, 1974 production

Hobana was becoming recognized as an expert in the Verne's work, to which, by 2004, he had dedicated over 20,000 pages of his own writing, published in over twenty countries. He personally handled translations from Verne, covering eight of the Voyages extraordinaires, and from H. G. Wells, covering all of Wells' prose. Also a dramaturge, Hobana completed a stage version of The Invisible Man. Praised by chronicler Ion Cocora as a "soundly written and constructed play", it was used by the Ion Creangă Theater of Bucharest in 1974, and by the Brașov Drama Theater in 1977. During the early 1970s, Hobana and Dan Culcer were contributing a science fiction column in Vatra of Cluj-Napoca. His translation work of the time included Navigators of Infinity by J.-H. Rosny aîné (1974) and Cyrano de Bergerac's States and Empires of the Moon (1980), but also Alexander Pushkin's Tale of the Fisherman and the Fish (1975). In parallel, Hobana had become a comics writer for Cutezătorii, a youth magazine put out by the Pioneer Organization. He also joined the editorial board of Secolul 20, a magazine that put out selections of world literature. As argued in 2017 by essayist Mircea Mihăieș, this publication subtly served Ceaușescu's propaganda, by supporting his international stances. Moreover, Mihăieș notes, Hobana and his colleagues were handpicked "devotees of the communist cause". In March 1976, Hobana was seconding Gheorghe Cioară as secretary of the Communist-Party chapter in Bucharest, and presenting a report on the fulfillment of ideological tasks.

Hobana's work in comparative literature as applied to science fiction made him a relevant figure on the scene; Flacăra's yearbook for 1979 rated him as "one of Europe's leading animators of science fiction literature." He tapped into an Italian-speaking market with another anthology, Fantascienza, for which he shared credits with Gianfranco de Turris. His documenting of a science-fiction tradition in Europe, that reached far beyond Gernsback's Amazing Stories, was useful in international debates of the time. Swedish author Sam J. Lundwall relied on Hobana to accuse Gernsback of "cultural imperialism", and to claim "that science fiction actually originated in Europe." At that stage of his career, Hobana was admitted into several international bodies, including the H. G. Wells Society and the Societé Européenne de Culture, also receiving the Polish Culture Ministry's grand prize for 1973. He continued to establish bridges between the Romanian school of science fiction and the other national cultures, in particular by regularly attending the Eurocon. A volume called Douăzeci de mii de pagini în căutarea lui Jules Verne ("Twenty Thousand Pages in a Search for Jules Verne") was put out at Editura Univers in 1979. Critic Constantin Crișan praised Hobana for having thus "inscribe[d] himself among the most valuable commentators-monographers of Jules Verne's work", noting that he had stayed away from the psychoanalytic standard, and instead focused on describing Verne as a fellow humanist. Douăzeci de mii de pagini also earned attention for advancing the claim that Verne had had a special love for the Romanian people (and also that he had visited Transylvania in 1892). This synthesis earned Hobana another continental prize for essays, at Eurocon 1980.

== Conformist Ceaușescuism and Revolution ==
Upon leaving Scînteia in 1972, and down to 1990, Hobana was an executive secretary of the USR. He had replaced the politically unreliable novelist Alexandru Ivasiuc—the voting maneuver was described by one of Ivasiuc's friends, Virgil Duda, as an "official swindle" (șmecherie oficială). His reelection in 1974 was also received with indignation by Eugen Barbu and other Romanian nationalists in the literary world, since they wrongly believed that Hobana was Jewish. In this capacity, Hobana dealt with recalcitrant writers who had come to criticize the regime. In January 1976, he received Dan Deșliu, who had been placed under surveillance by the Securitate agency and was being exposed to disruption techniques. Deșliu announced that he was relinquishing his party membership, but those present tried to persuade him to reconsider. Hobana was also supposed to issue warnings to writers who had trespassed against Ceaușescu's ideological commands: in 1977, he countersigned the official decision to expel Paul Goma, an outspoken anti-communist, from professional life; he later participated in sessions which condemned Bujor Nedelcovici for publishing one of his novels abroad; he also chided the literary critic Geo Șerban, who had attended an unsupervised screening at the Hungarian People's Republic embassy. More prudent, Mircea Iorgulescu personally asked for, and obtained, Hobana's permission to discuss literary matters with an Israeli scholar, A. B. Yoffe.

Hobana himself also engaged the USR as a contributor to Ceaușescu's personality cult, extending it to his wife Elena. At a writers' congress in September 1980, he argued that the Romanian first lady was what "ensures the bright future of Romanian literature, culture and science. [...] Never before has a woman played such a decisive role in Romanian history, with her personality leaving such a huge mark on this era." The following month, as secretary of the Communist Party's USR chapter, he welcomed Ceaușescu himself. On that occasion, Hobana presented a report on "the development of a new, socialist literature", and on the insight gained by his fellow writers through organized, unmitigated contact with "the large masses of working men and women." In January 1986, Hobana also contributed to a Ceaușescu Festschrift. His article took a theoretical angle, looking to explain Ceaușescu's "new humanism". Also that year, Hobana is alleged to have intervened between Marius Tupan and Cartea Românească publishers, to prevent the release of Tupan's novel, Vitrina cu păsări împăiate ("Stuffed Birds in the Window"). The author himself was never told what Hobana's reasons were, but he believes that the manuscript's title was read as an allusion to the Ceaușescu family.

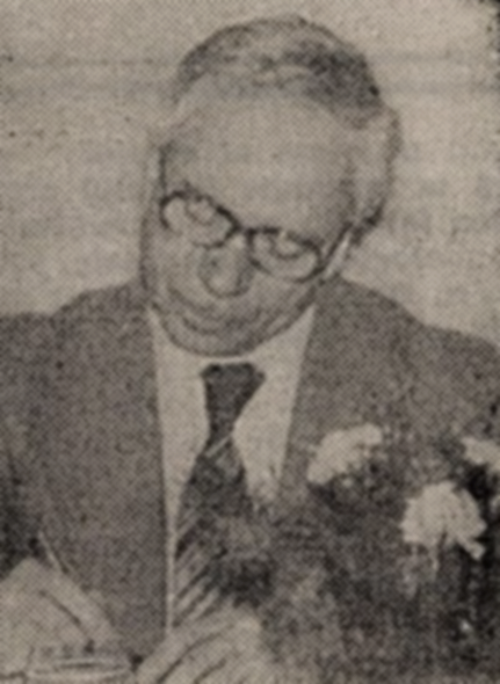
Hobana in 1989

In 1979, Hobana had published in România Literară twelve interwar letters by the Romanian poet Ion Barbu, which had been discovered by Weverbergh in Belgium. Also then, he created and hosted (to 1982) a TVR 1 series, Triumful visătorilor ("The Triumph of Dreamers"), which explored the links between ancient oneiromancy, science fiction, and actual scientific advances. He worked with educators on completing a "literature textbook for children", which became part of the official curriculum by 1982. He was again a recipient of the USR prize for the essays grouped as the 1983 volume Science fiction. Autori, cărți, idei ("Science Fiction. Authors, Books, Ideas"). These are noted by fellow writer Voicu Bugariu for their insight into the science fantasy elements of works by Macedonski and Arthur Conan Doyle, as well as for a "fascinating" review of alien flora as imagined by various authors. The companion piece, appearing in 1986 as Literatura de anticipație. Autori, cărți, idei ("Literature of Anticipation. Authors, Books, Ideas"), looked into the deeper history of science fiction—and especially into works by Edgar Allan Poe. On the basis of his research, Hobana concluded that Poe was the true originator of the genre. He returned to other genres with the epic poem Horea, eponymously titled after the 18th-century peasant rebel. Published by Editura Ion Creangă in 1984, and illustrated by Sabin Bălașa, it was described by reviewer Dumitru Toma as "beautiful and moving".

Hobana returned to publishing in 1987 with another volume of sketch stories, called Un fel de spațiu ("A Sort of Space"); these are described by columnist Ioan Holban as bordering on detective fiction, "likable, with obvious literary qualities." Lascu also expressed admiration for the book's focus on "infusing aesthetic value to the [science fiction] genre", coming at a time when the Romanian market was already accepting of inferior works. His other work was in putting out a critical edition of Cezar Petrescu's 1943 work of robot fiction, Baletul mecanic. He was commended by cultural sociologist Z. Ornea for having "stepped with the right foot" into "the more and more narrow world of editors". Also that year, Hobana became a coordinator of the European Science Fiction Society. During the late 1980s, the USR's activities were again being criticized by the nationalist faction of writers, who viewed themselves as tacitly excluded from managerial positions. One of them was Ion Lăncrănjan, who suggested in 1989 that Hobana and his colleagues, who had been "'handed down' the posts they now occupy", could always re-baptize the USR as "Union of Some Romanian Writers".

In September of that year, Hobana appeared at the science fiction convention in Timișoara, co-hosted by the Communist Youth. He gave a speech titled: "The views of the Communist Party and of its general secretary, comrade Nicolae Ceaușescu, regarding the overwhelming role of science and culture in the creation of a multilaterally developed socialist society, and in advancing Romania on the path to communism". This was shortly before the Romanian Revolution ended communism. Hobana continued to be active on the cultural scene in its wake, and provided retrospective criticism of communist censorship. With an August 1990 article in Cronica, he explored the work of novelist Norman Manea, who had been repressed and chased out of the country by the Ceaușescuist authorities. He noted that Manea had acquired a genuine literary fame in his place of exile, and that his recovery was "one of the many priorities that should be taken up by our school of criticism." The early 1990s witnessed a selective publication of white papers detailing surveillance of Romania's citizens by the Securitate agency, throughout communism. Hobana's name was conspicuously absent from these sources, leading various commentators to speculate that he had been a Securitate asset, who did not need to be informed on.

== Old age ==
Hobana's Vernenian research was again synthesized in the volume Jules Verne în România, first presented at the Bucharest French Institute in October 1992. He continued to work as a translator, with a version of The Doctored Man, by Maurice Renard, appearing in 1991, followed up in 1993 by two of Roberto Bonadimani's novels. In the new post-revolutionary context, his work as a histriographer was carried on by Mircea Opriță. The latter's Anticipația românească appeared in 1994 in just 100 copies, but was rated by scholar Ovidiu Pecican as better researched and more complex that Hobana's earlier essays. In the 1990s, Hobana also formalized his activities as a ufologist. In 1998, he established a Romanian Agency for UFO Studies, or ASFAN, which he also presided (assisted by a steering committee which included astronomer Harald Alexandrescu); as part of this effort, in 1995 he reviewed the alien autopsy tape (which he regarded as likely authentic), and obtained broadcasting rights on behalf of the Romanian Television. The Roswell incident preoccupied him over many years, informing his 1997 monograph, published at Editura Agni. Here, he concluded that "the [discovered] fragments were indeed parts of an alien spacecraft". He also claimed that the Romanian Land Forces had allowed him access into their archives, allowing him to document UFO sightings in Romania leading back to 1913. His claims were received with derision by poet Daniela Crăsnaru, particularly after Hobana had asserted that Romania was visited by flying saucers, whereas it took triangles to cover other regions of the world.

In old age, Hobana reconnected with the literary society of Bârlad, which he called his spiritual home; in 1996, the local newspaper Bârladul hosted his essay on Mihai Eminescu. In 1997, he took another USR prize for his Wells-themed monograph, called Un englez neliniștit ("That Jaunty Englishman"). His other contribution was another textbook of children's literature, included in the national curriculum for the 12th grade of normal school. This work was reviewed with alarm by literary critic Nicolae Manolescu, who contended that it was methodologically unsound, confusing, and "humorless", forcing students to spend their learning time on irrelevant works. Hobana had resumed his collaboration with Weverbergh for a book version of Triumful visătorilor, appearing at Editura Nemira in 1998. In 2000, Hobana and Gérard Klein established an annual prize for Romanian science fiction writers, named in honor of Vladimir Colin; also then, Hobana printed his final translation, from Emilio Salgari's Le meraviglie del Duemila. From 2004, he curated a self-titled collection of early science fiction for Editura Minerva, introducing works by Poe and Robert Louis Stevenson. His version of Invisible Man was again scheduled to be performed at Luceafărul Theater of Iași in early 2008. He also joined the USR central council, while managing a children's literature section at the Bucharest Association of Writers.

Hobana's final works include another war-themed novel. Appearing in 2007 as Călătorie întreruptă ("Interrupted Journey"), it was largely sympathetic to far-right youths, of the kind that were recruited by the Iron Guard, and who view the pending disaster with "a lovable callousness". According to columnist Simona Vasilache, in its details about children the book is also autofictional. In 2009, Hobana published at Bastion of Timișoara his final volume of short stories, Timp pentru dragoste ("A Time for Love"). Later that year, he was diagnosed with an unspecified disease, and only given some nine months to live. He managed to complete his overview of French science fiction, Peste o sută și o mie de ani ("Over a Hundred and a Thousand Years"), published at Editura Academiei; he survived to his 80th birthday, but his health declined sharply after that date. Hobana died at Colțea Hospital of Bucharest on 22 February 2011. Later that year, Ioan Jebelean High School in his native Sânnicolau Mare opened an Ion Hobana Literary Circle. His name was also adopted by the Romanian Science Fiction and Fantasy Society, which, in November 2017, organized a Hobana colloquium on robotic process automation.
