= Mărunțișu =

Mărunțișu may refer to several villages in Romania:

- Mărunțișu, a village in the town of Pătârlagele, Buzău County
- Mărunțișu, a village in Costeștii din Vale Commune, Dâmbovița County
