= Henri Stahl =

Romanian stenographer and graphologist (1877–1942)

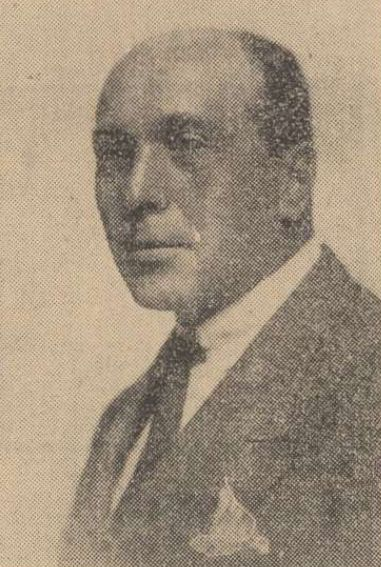
Henri Stahl

Henri Joseph Stahl (also known as Henric, Enric, or Henry Stahl; April 29, 1877 – February 18, 1942) was a Romanian stenographer, graphologist, historian and fiction writer. Born to educated immigrant parents, he was a friend and disciple of Nicolae Iorga, doyen of modern Romanian historiography. Much of his work in the field resulted in a monographic and conservationist study of his native Bucharest, which was published by Iorga in 1910.

Stahl created an original system of a stenography, which worked as one of the basic Romanian stenography standards, and, as resident expert at the National Archives, set up the Romanian school of graphology and paleography. The author of humorous stories and memoirs, he also contributed the novel Un român în lună ("A Romanian on the Moon"), seen as one of the pioneering works in Romanian science fiction.

In addition to his scholarly and literary work, Stahl worked as a stenographer for public institutions, which allowed him to witness significant events in Romanian political history, and was a distinguished veteran of World War I. Stahl was the father of sociologist Henri H. Stahl and of novelist Henriette Yvonne Stahl, as well as the stepfather of Șerban Voinea, a political thinker and militant of the Romanian Social Democratic Party.

== Biography ==
=== Origins and early life ===
Henri Stahl was the son of an Orientalist and lexicographer, Joseph "Iosif" Stahl (1820–1890), described in sources as "a cross between an Alsatian man and a Swiss woman", or, in the Stahls' genealogy, as a Bavarian baron. According to Henriette Yvonne Stahl, her grandfather was originally active in the Kingdom of Greece, in service to King Otto, before being taken prisoner by the Ottoman Empire. He owed his relocation to Wallachia (an autonomous subject of the Ottomans) to the intercession of Prince Barbu Dimitrie Știrbei, who employed him as a Dragoman of the court. Reportedly, his second wife, Irma Niard, known in Romanian as Irina Stahl, was from a Normand family, the orphaned daughter of a prize-winning painter. From Joseph's earlier marriage, Henri had a half-sister, Ana "Nety" Stahl (1853–1929).

The Stahls lived in Wallachia, and later in unified Romania as pedagogues and owners of a boarding school (although Irma never learned Romanian). By the time of Henri's birth, Joseph had had a lengthy career in publishing, with phrasebooks for German, French, or Romanian, beginning with the 1853 Kleine Walachische Sprachlehre.

Born in Bucharest, Henri was himself a polyglot and a student of history. He enlisted at the city's university, where he became one of Iorga's star students and fervent followers. According to sociologist Mircea Ioanid, "he made himself famous with his modest but fruitful activities in the public sphere, but most of all through his cultural pioneering". A graduate of the Faculty of Letters, Stahl invented a method for Romanian stenography, which was based on Duployan shorthand. He outlined its rules in a 1900 textbook: Metoda pentru a stenografia cu alfabetul latin pentru uzul studenților, ziariștilor și tuturor celor care au de scris repede ("A Method for Stenography in the Latin Alphabet, Useful to Students, Journalists and All Those Who Have to Write Fast"). By then, Stahl had been employed as a reviewer-stenographer by the Parliament of Romania.

Around 1900, Stahl was in France, where he published a guide to the Duployan method and a stenotype how-to: La machine à écrire—machine à stenographier. He fell deeply in love with Blanche-Alexandrine Francis Boeuve, who taught at her mother's school in Bucharest. She was three years his senior, had worked as a seamstress, and had French Jewish origins. From a previous relationship, Blanche had a six-year-old son, Gaston.

The affair angered Irma Stahl, who sacked Blanche after she let it be known that she carried Stahl's child. Moving in with her sister in Saint-Avold, Lorraine, she gave birth to a daughter, Henriette. The forceful separation and Henriette's health problems as an infant led Stahl to contemplate suicide; Irma Stahl eventually yielded to his threats, allowing mother and daughter to return and live with her in Bucharest.

Henri legally married Blanche in 1901. The couple soon had another son, Henri H. Stahl. Blanche became an expert in touch typing, and, after her move to Romania, wrote several textbooks of her own. By then, Henri was experimenting with political and humorous writing. In 1901, he became a contributor to Ion Luca Caragiale's satirical sheet, Moftul Român. He was an imitator of Caragiale, and, according to Iorga, was one of the best, fitted with a "tender understanding of things". Having acquired a first-hand understanding of the emerging Romanian trends in public speaking, Stahl also published a September 1906 notice on the "style of Romanian orators" in the Blaj review Revista Politică și Literară.

=== Oral historian and science fiction author ===
In 1903, Stahl was working for the Chancellery of the Romanian Senate and was teacher at his mother and wife's boarding school on Brutus Street (where he also resided). Stahl resumed his close contacts with Iorga: Iorga regularly visited Stahl's home and office, where he freely dictated his books for Stahl to write down. Stahl also joined the staff of Iorga's summer school in Vălenii de Munte, where, in 1908, he was teaching stenography courses. Iorga's academic press of Vălenii put out his 1909 Curs complect de stenografie cu vocale ("Complete Course of Stenography, Vowels Included"). Also that year, he put out a French-language introduction to French and German stenography, lithographed in Bucharest.

In addition to such contributions, Stahl preserved a passion for oral history and the history of Bucharest. He walked through the city, made notes of its interesting features, created stone rubs from old inscriptions, and interviewed senior citizens. His son Henri Jr, who followed him on such excursions, recalls: "He had the special gift of being able to converse with simple people, old and young alike, winning them over with his own matching simplicity, addressing them in their own language, in the very spirit of their mentality." As literary critic Dan C. Mihăilescu notes, Stahl and Iorga were both conservative adversaries of 20th-century modernization, who disliked popular culture and feared the growth of the petite bourgeoisie. Henri Jr also sees his father as a disciple of Iorga's traditionalist doctrine, or Sămănătorism.

Occasionally, Stahl returned to fiction writing, producing Un român în lună, the found manuscript of space exploration: a newspaperman chances upon a mysterious text, which turns out to be the stenographic account of a Romanian voyage to the Moon. Stahl described his novel as more of a "popular treatise in astronomy", a "well-written" and accessible illustration of scientific facts. In his 1915 review of the novel, Mihail Sevastos of Viața Românească noted: "Mr. Stahl imagined himself a Flammarion of the Romanians". According to philologist Petru Iamandi, the book's "rather obvious positivism" is balanced by "enthusiasm" and "funny remarks", but "the lack of a genuine conflict [is] the main shortcoming of Stahl's book". As noted in 1998 by cultural journalist Cristian Tudor Popescu, Un român în lună can indeed be considered important for the emergence of Romanian science fiction, but it is also "negligent" and "inferior" to its Western models, from Edgar Allan Poe to Jules Verne. The unique element, Popescu suggests, is the explorer's motivation: he has left Earth out of misanthropy and disgust for politicking, but also for a belief in human transcendence (an "Omega Point", according to Popescu). Sevastos pointed out that Stahl's "social criticism" was of the "aggressive" kind, quoting a passage in which the narrator reads Iorga's initials, "dear as they will once be to all Romanians", into the lunar surface.

Stahl considered publishing the work, and showed it to Iorga for a critical opinion. He met Iorga's opposition, who asked him "to forget the moon and stars" and write a new book using the style around the first chapter, in which Stahl depicts life in turn-of-the-century Bucharest. Therefore, Stahl's literary debut was in 1910 with Bucureștii ce se duc ("Vanishing Bucharest"), serialized in Iorga's Neamul Românesc journal, then bound together as a volume issued in Vălenii. Iorga later described Stahl, alongside Ion Agârbiceanu, Romulus Cioflec and Dumitru C. Moruzi, as Neamul Românesc's leading prose writer.

The book is feted for its colorful depictions of Bucharesters at the beginning of the 20th century, but also for outlining the conservative thesis favored at Neamul Românesc. Stahl sees modern Bucharest as a playground for handmaidens and their aroused admirers, riddled with "moronic" pastimes such as binge drinking and visits to the City Morgue. Stahl also protests against the Haussmannian renovation of downtown Bucharest, and proposes that all condemned buildings be photographed and inventoried for historical reference.

Stahl followed up with humorous sketch stories: Dela manevre ("From the Maneuvers"), printed by Iorga in 1912, and the 1915 Macabre și viceversa ("Macabre Ones and Vice Versa"). He did eventually publish his science fiction novel: first in 1913, serialized in Victor Anestin's Ziarul Călătoriilor magazine, then as a single volume in 1914. In the latter popular edition, produced at the Bucharest Institute of Graphic Arts, the "astronomical novel" was illustrated by Stoica D. and Ary Murnu. At an unknown later date, Stahl also produced a volume of Schițe parlamentare ("Parliamentary Sketches"), with models of oratory, samples of ignominious behavior, and memoirs of parliamentary disputes.

=== World War I ===
During the early 1910s, Stahl made visits to the Romanian communities of Austria-Hungary, and in particular to those of Transylvania and Partium. Under Germanic influence, Transylvanian Romanian intellectuals had devised their own shorthand system, codified by Vasile Vlaicu. However, Stahl was contracted by Romanian National Party leaders to record their February 1911 meeting with the constituents of Arad, Békés and Csanád counties, which doubled as a protest against Magyarization policies and for universal suffrage. Stahl was enthusiastic about the events, and contrasted the enthusiasm and sincerity of Transylvanians with the politicking of his Bucharest employers. He left notes on the "natural bond between the people and the leaders", and found the Partium peasants to be exceptionally polite, as well as "fair, intelligent, and proud".

Stahl was drafted into the Romanian Land Forces in 1916, when Romania entered World War I as an enemy of Austria-Hungary. He was a reserve lieutenant in the 6th (Mihai Viteazu) Regiment. He saw action during the early stages of the Romanian Campaign, but was badly wounded in the trenches during the battles of September 1916. Losing consciousness, he was dragged away and rescued by his peasant batman, and was under treatment at Gerota hospital when Iorga dedicated him an encomium in Neamul Românesc (September 23, 1916). He was a convalescent in Ploiești when the Central Powers occupied southern Romania.

Leaving his children and wife behind, Stahl escaped to Moldavia, where the Romanian government authorities resided. During 1917, he resumed his collaboration with Iorga, who was putting out in Iași, the provisional capital, a new review called Drum Drept. He resumed his work as stenographer, and followed Romanian parliamentarians on their refuge to Russia's Kherson Governorate. He was caught there by the October Revolution, and witnessed the mounting tensions between anticommunist Romanians and Rumcherod officials. Blanche and the Stahl children lived in occupied Bucharest, and were helped to survive by their peasant acquaintances, through contraband goods. Stahl eventually returned to the occupied capital after the Romanian armistice (April 1918), and had to watch resentfully as the German Army embarked on a campaign of hasty requisitions.

Stahl resumed his work in parliament after the German capitulation of November. During the late 1910s and early 1920s, he was vice president of the Deputies' Assembly corps of stenographers, in which capacity he taught free lessons in stenography to university students. For that purpose, he issued a 1919 Curs de stenografie parlamentară ("Parliamentary Stenography Course"). In interwar Greater Romania, Stahl expanded the focus of his investigations and interviews, with trips to mountain localities such as Breaza and Covasna, and resumed his literary work, in the eclectic newspaper Cuget Românesc. Un român în lună went through a second edition in 1925.

=== Final decades ===
Both of Stahl's male heirs were involved in social sciences. Known to the world as Șerban Voinea (a pseudonym he first used in 1919), Gaston became a Romanian citizen in 1929. He was a Marxist theoretician, seen by Ioanid as one of "worldwide value" and a "classic of Romanian sociology", whose semi-legal activities in the Socialist Party of Romania resulted in prosecution at the Dealul Spirii Trial. Living abroad during much of the 1920s, he was a graduate of several academic institutions, including the Free College of Social Sciences. Returning to Romania in the 1930s, Voinea primarily worked as a radio journalist, and was the theoretical voice of the reformist and pro-Western Romanian Social Democratic Party. Henri Jr was himself a student of Iorga, but not a follower, and alienated Iorga when he stated his preference for rural sociology over history. As a researcher, he brought up empirical evidence which supported some of Iorga's core theses, but criticized his attempts to silence other opponents. Faced with financial difficulties for much of his life, he supplemented his income by working in stenography, which he had learned from his father.

To her father's despair, Henriette had a troubled childhood and shunned academic life in favor of sheer experimentation. She was, by contemporary accounts, an extraordinarily beautiful woman. She graduated from the Bucharest School of Drama but enjoyed most acclaim as a writer. Her father encouraged her, submitting her debut novel Voica to a literary contest in 1924. From 1931 to 1944, Henriette was married to the poet-translator Ion Vinea and notoriously shared his passion for hard drugs, which inspired her to write violently modernist novels.

From 1925, Stahl's expertise in graphology was harnessed by the National Archives of Romania and its Superior School of Archivists and Paleographers. Stahl's work for those years includes a 1926 textbook of graphology. It was positively reviewed at the time by the social scientist Mihai Ralea, according to whom "given [Stahl's] technical expertise, nobody would have been better suited for the task than him". The textbook notably included writing samples "from virtually all of modern Romania's personalities", alongside character sketches. He had also published, in 1925, the war-themed volume of sketches called Spion ("A Spy"), praised by Ralea for its authenticity.

A second edition of Bucureștii ce se duc came out in 1935 at E. Marvan Publishers, illustrated with 175 photographs taken by Stahl himself. Stahl published in 1936 his own contribution in the field of paleography: a textbook for Old Church Slavonic, in collaboration with the Slavist Damian P. Bogdan. He retired from the Archivists' School in 1938, when Aurel Sacerdoțeanu took over as Director, but was still considered one of the school's prime experts, and honored by Sacerdoțeanu as the founder of Romanian graphology.

Stahl died in February 1942. This occurred during the Nazi-allied dictatorship of Ion Antonescu (to which his son Voinea was structurally opposed), while the Stahl children had come under official investigation, to decide whether the racial laws applied to them. The stenographer-historian was buried in Bucharest's Bellu cemetery, the Roman Catholic section. His death is recorded in the diary of a marginalized politician, Constantin Argetoianu, right after news of General Wavell's injury: "Death of Henri Stahl, the known stenographer. Stahl was also a remarkable writer and a very decent man. We bury with him another piece of our past, the past of old folks..." Stahl's book of World War I memoirs, titled Cu Parlamentul în U.R.S.S. ("With the Parliament in the USSR"), was issued later that month, at the height of Romania's involvement in the anti-Soviet war.

== Legacy ==
Upon the end of the war, Stahl's two male heirs wrote Romania's first course in Marxist sociology. Voinea became ambassador of Romania in Bern, but fell out with the communist regime and defected to the West. He worked for the French Radio and Television Broadcasting and was active within the International Confederation of Free Trade Unions. The other Stahls remained in Romania. Henriette's relation to Voinea resulted in the censoring of her novels, and she was banned from publishing for some 10 years. She was protected from imprisonment by her ten-year-long affair with Petru Dumitriu, the official communist poet. When Dumitriu himself defected in 1960, Henriette was detained for several months and made to confess that she had been Dumitriu's ghostwriter. She was later released, and continued to publish, in both Romania and her native France, until well into her seventies; she died in 1984.

Harassed by Securitate agents and prevented from publishing until the 1960s (during which interval he had to work in systematization), Henri H. Stahl was eventually allowed to join the editorial staffs of Biblioteca Historica Romaniae and Viitorul Social. He was by then lovingly married to the visual artist Margareta Stahl. His earlier affair with Maria Costin had produced a son, Paul H. Stahl; trained in sociology and art history, he escaped to France in 1969, to teach at the School for Advanced Studies in the Social Sciences. Henri was fully reinstated after the 1989 Revolution, and welcomed into the Romanian Academy shortly before his death, which occurred on September 9, 1991.

The censorship which touched his descendants under communism did not affect Henri Sr's own cultural legacy. New editions of Un român în lună saw print in 1958 and 1966. Years after the anticommunist revolution, the Stahl method was still being taught in stenography classes. In 2002, Editura Domino put out a new version of Bucureștii ce se duc, but this reissue was incomplete and lacked a critical introduction. Schițe parlamentare was also reissued in 2003.
