= Colecția de Povestiri Științifico-Fantastice =

Romanian science fiction supplement

Colecția de Povestiri Științifico-Fantastice (Romanian pronunciation: [koˈlekt͡si.a de povesˈtirʲ ʃti.inˈt͡sifiko fanˈtastit͡ʃe], "The Science Fiction Stories Collection", commonly CPSF) is a Romanian science fiction supplement, founded by writer Adrian Rogoz and published by the popular science weekly Ştiinţă şi Tehnică. It was one of the leading venues for the Romanian science fiction genre under the communist regime. The first series was published between October 1, 1955, and April 1974; the review was reestablished in 1990, after the 1989 Revolution, originally as a common venture with the Anticipația almanac (itself in print from 1982 to 1999). In 2012–2015 was published as a standalone magazine by Editura Nemira.

== History ==
Colecția... was established following a nationwide competition for "the best science fiction story", aimed at young Romanian writers. Launched by Știință și Tehnică, it had among its winners Adrian Rogoz, who was subsequently asked to take over as editor of the bi-monthly collection. As a result, Romania was the first and for long only Eastern European (Eastern Bloc) country to have a specialized science fiction publication.

The collection published 466 consecutive issues, generally structured around a long, serialized, story and a shorter one. Beginning in the 1960s, it spearheaded the science fiction club phenomenon, promoted by Rogoz and fellow writer Ion Hobana. The collection itself was deemed "extraordinary popular" by author Mihai Iovănel, in a 2008 article for Gândul; however, Iovănel also argued that, through the early contributions of various writers (Radu Nor, I. M. Ştefan etc.), CPSF was a mild propaganda outlet for Marxism-Leninism and the Soviet Union (see Russian science fiction and fantasy, Soviet occupation of Romania, Socialist realism in Romania). The same writer notes that Romanian science fiction in general and Colecţia... in particular only emancipated themselves from such pressures late in the 1960s, partly through the science fantasy works of Rogoz, Vladimir Colin, Sergiu Fărcăşan and several others.

Relaunched in 1990 by author Mihai Dan Pavelescu, Colecția... merged with Anticipaţia and was for a while known as CPSF Anticipația. Pavelescu quit his position by the end of the decade, and the magazine, again restructured, experienced changes in direction, financial difficulties, and, allegedly, controversy over who owned its trademark. Writer Aurel Cărășel eventually took over as Colecţia... editor and moved its headquarters from Bucharest to Craiova, but, according to science fiction reviewer Michael Hăulică, there was little connection between the two series, Cărăşel's being unremarkable.

== See also ==
- List of magazines in Romania
