= Costeștii din Vale =

- Commune
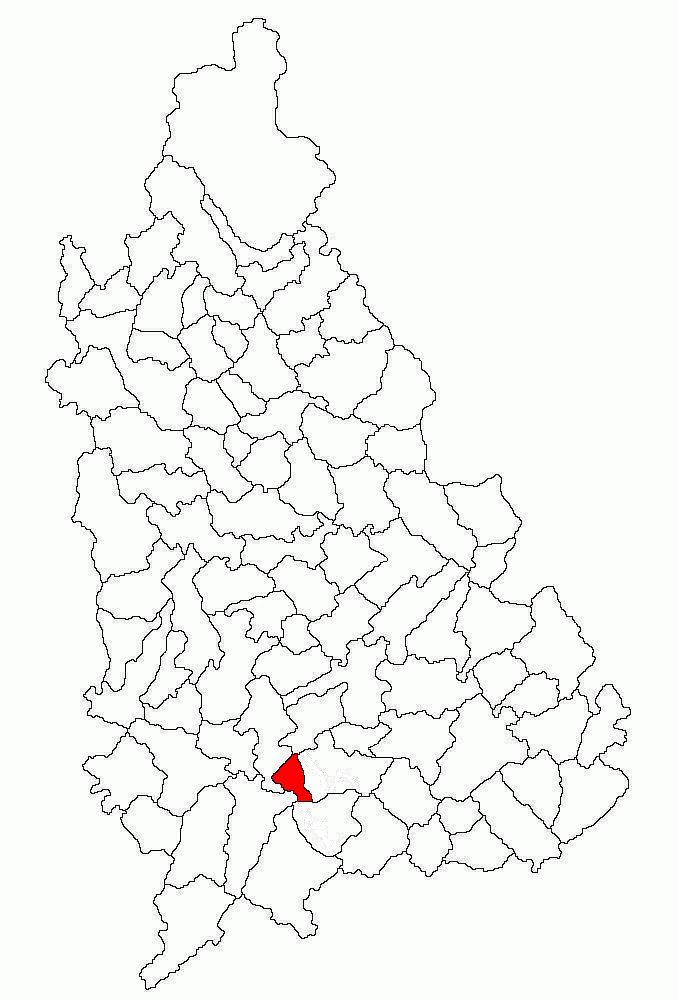
- Location in Dâmbovița County

- Location in Romania
- Coordinates: 44°39′N 25°29′E
- Country: Romania
- County: Dâmbovița

Government
  - Mayor (2024–2028): Valentin-Zsolt Dună (PSD)
- Elevation: 156 m (512 ft)
- Population (2021-12-01): 3,437
- Time zone: EET/EEST (UTC+2/+3)
- Postal code: 137165
- Area code: +(40) 245
- Vehicle reg.: DB
- Website: primariacostestivale.ro

Costeștii din Vale is a commune in Dâmbovița County, Muntenia, Romania. It is composed of three villages: Costeștii din Vale, Mărunțișu, and Tomșani.

Historical population
Year	Pop.	±%
2002	3,454	—
2011	3,485	+0.9%
2021	3,437	−1.4%
Source: Census data

== Natives ==
- Ștefan Ion Ghilimescu (b. 1947), writer
- Petru Verussi (1847–1886), painter
- I. C. Vissarion (1883–1951), writer and inventor, one-time village mayor
