= Victor Anestin =

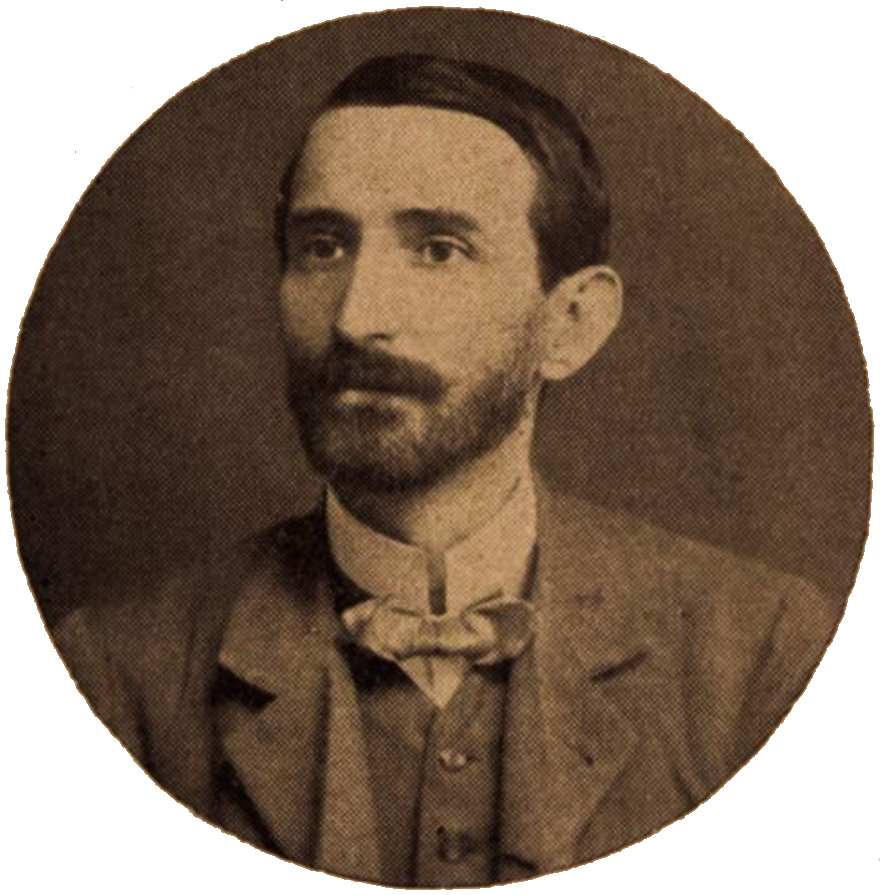
- Anestin c. 1900
- Born: 17 September 1875; Bacău, Romania
- Died: 5 November 1918 (aged 43); Bucharest, Romania
- Occupations: astronomer journalist writer

Victor Anestin (Romanian pronunciation: [ˈviktor anesˈtin]; 17 September 1875 – 5 November 1918) was a Romanian journalist, science popularizer, astronomer and science fiction writer.

== Biography ==
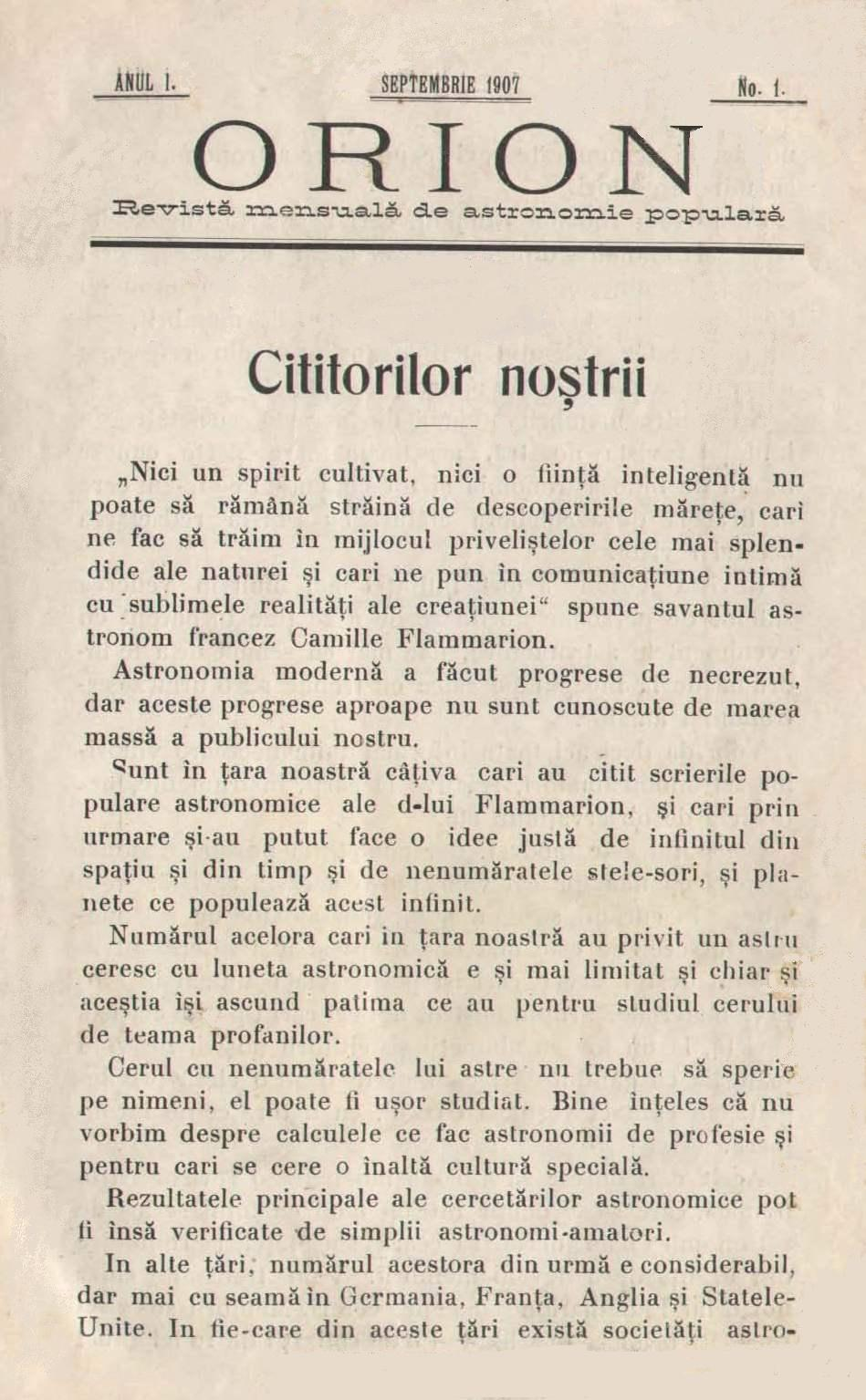
First page of Orion magazine, 1st issue, September 1907

Born in Bacău, Victor Anestin was the son of actor Ion Anestin. He graduated high school in Craiova and went on to work for some measly wages as proof reader for various Bucharest newspapers.

As an astronomer, he made a few original observations over planet Venus and published several articles in foreign journals such as La Nature, Monthly Register and L'Astronomie.

Between 1907 and 1912, he published the first Romanian astronomical journal, Orion and in 1908, he was the founder of the Societatea astronomică română "Camille Flammarion". In 1912, Anestin became the director of the Ziarul Călătoriilor, which he renamed in Ziarul ştiinţelor populare ("Journal of Popular Sciences") and its circulation rose to 15,000. Together with C. I. Istrati, he founded Universitatea Populară din București in 1912 and at the end of the year 1913, he founded the Prietenii Ṣtiinţei association.

== Legacy ==
Anestin wrote three science fiction novels and a large number of articles and over a hundred booklets about science.

In his novel A Celestial Tragedy (published in February 1914), Anestin has one of the earliest descriptions of the possibility of using the atomic power for war purposes, being published in the same year as H. G. Wells' The World Set Free.

In physics, they have managed to go to the roots of the structure of matter; moreover, at present, they make use of intra-atomic power [...] They have used this extraordinary power in wars as well; but, because of its disastrous effects, the states have signed a convention under which they pledge to use it for scientific purposes alone."

The astronomical observatory of Bacău bears his name.

== Science fiction novels ==
- În anul 4000 sau O călătorie la Venus (In the year 4000, or A trip to Venus, 1899)
- O tragedie cerească, Poveste astronomică (A Celestial Tragedy, An Astronomical Story, 1914)
- Puterea ştiinţei, sau Cum a fost omorât Răsboiul European, Poveste fantastică (The Power of Science, or How was the European War Killed, Fantasy Story, 1916)
- Camille Flammarion (1901)
- Haralamb Lecca, autor dramatic. Studiu critic (1901)
- Cucerirea aerului (1909)
- Stelele. Notiuni populare de astronomie (1909)
- Astronomie populară (traducere din limba engleză după H. Macpherson, 1909)
- Vine cometa Halley (1909)
- Ce sunt cometele (1910)
- Planeta Marte este ea locuită? (1910)
- Giordano Bruno. Viața și opera lui (1911)
- Newton și Atracțiunea universală (1911)
- In lumea spiritelor (1911)
- Observațiuni astronomice. Planeta Venus în 1911 (1911)
- Venus diurna (1911)
- Eclipsele sau Întunecimile de Soare și de Lună (1912)
- Romanul cerului - astronomie pentru toti (1912)
- Studii astronomice - rasaritul si apusul astrelor (1913)
- Cum să înveți stelele - Cu 28 de hărți cerești în text, Casa Școalelor, București, 1913
- Cum să înveți stelele - Cu 28 de hărți cerești în text, Casa Școalelor, (Ediția a II-a, 1922 / 1923), București
- Cum să înveți stelele - Cu 27 de hărți cerești în text, Ediția a III-a comentată, revizuită și adăugită de Mircea Pteancu și Dan-George Uza, Editura Astromix, Cluj-Napoca 2021, 252 de pagini, ISBN 978-606-95123-1-9
- O tragedie cerească, Poveste astronomică (1914) (roman științifico-fantastic)
- Eclipsele de soare (191
- Știința și Morala (1915)
- Viața și invețiunile lui Edison (1915)
- Căpitanul Scott la Polul Sud (1915)
- Ce trebue să citim (1915)
- Viata și opera lui William Herschel (1915)
- Femeile învățate (1915)
- Visele. După Flammarion (1916)
- Puterea științei, sau Cum a fost omorât Răsboiul European, Poveste fantastică (1916) (roman științifico-fantastic)
- Povestea stiintei (1916)
- Eroii științei (1916)
- Cutremurele de Pămînt (1916)
- Minunile naturei. Razele x și radiul, după Ch. Gibson și Ramsay (1916)
- Povestea vulcanilor după St. Meunier, Flammarion și Guillemin (1916)
- Povești astronomice (1916)
- Se va stinge soarele? Soarele după astronomia modernă (1916)
- Amintiri din teatru (1918)
- Viata anecdotica a invatatilor ilustri
- Viata si opera celebrilor exploratori (1922)
- Calatorii extraordinare (1922)
- Cum sa inveti stelele (1922)
- Stelele (1930)
- Savanti si inventatori care au schimbat cursul lumii (2010)
- O tragedie cereasca. Puterea stiintei (2010)
