= Education in Romania =

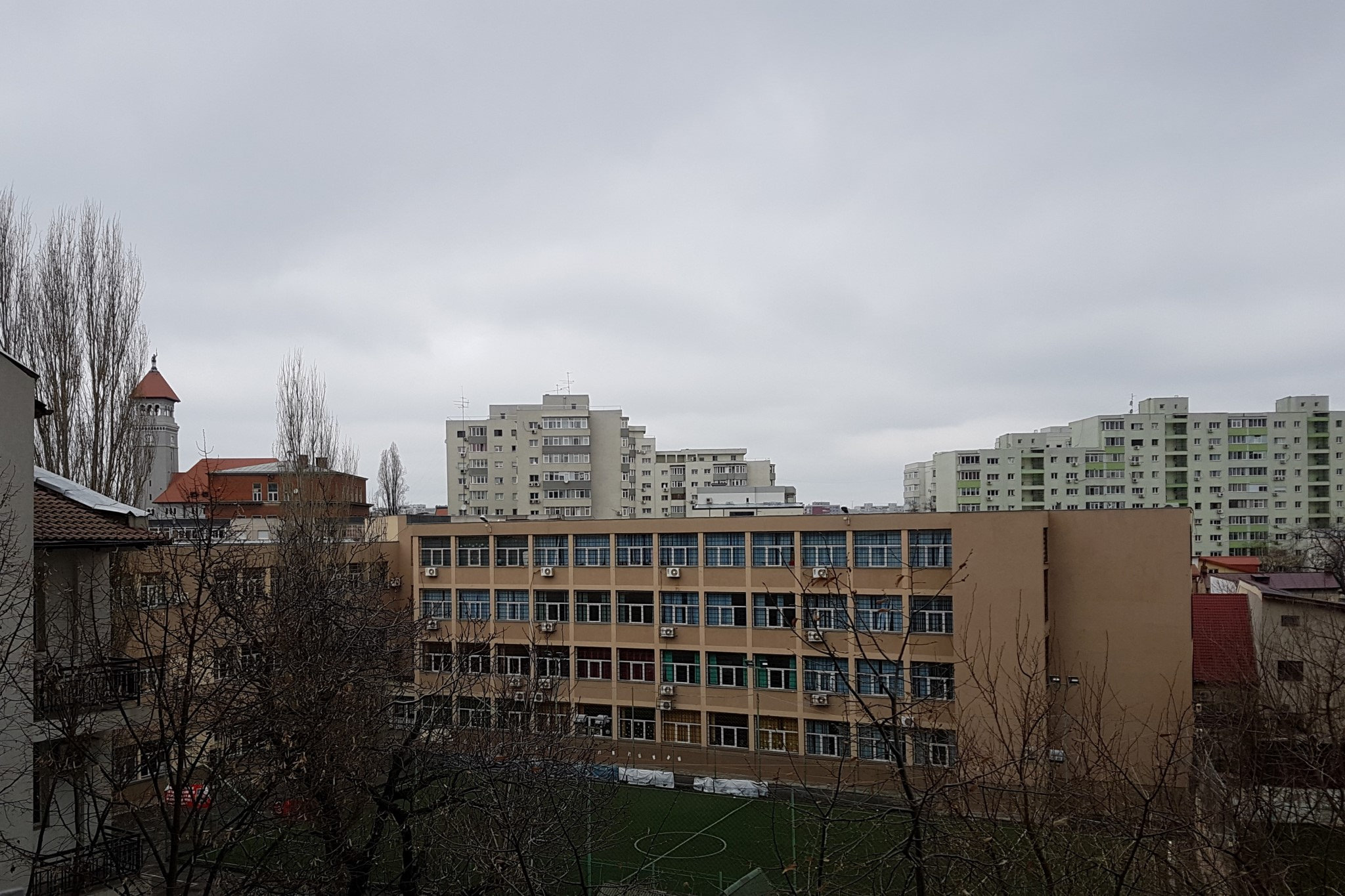
A typical general school (grades 0-8) in Bucharest.

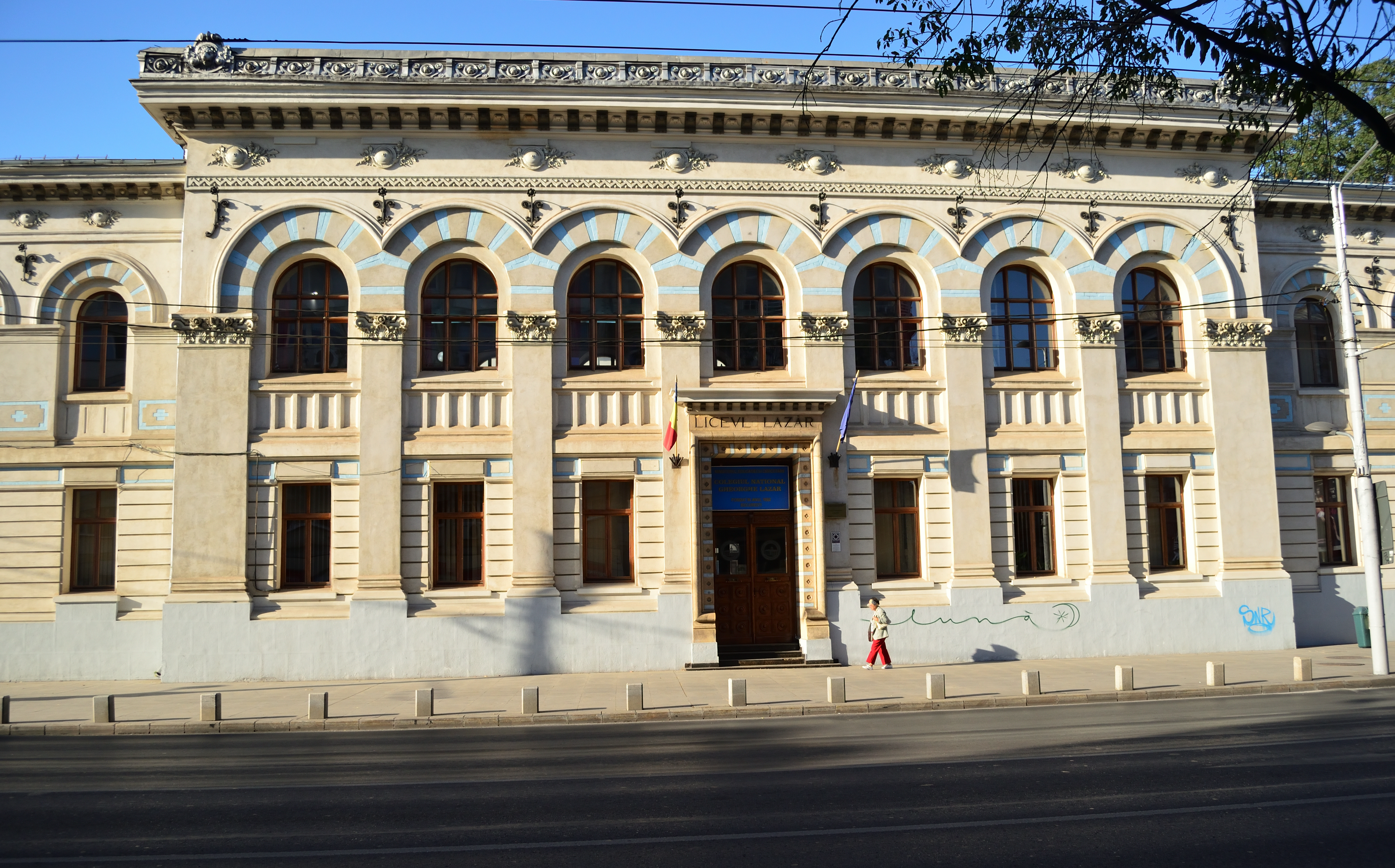
Gheorghe Lazăr National College, a high school (grades 9-12) in Bucharest.

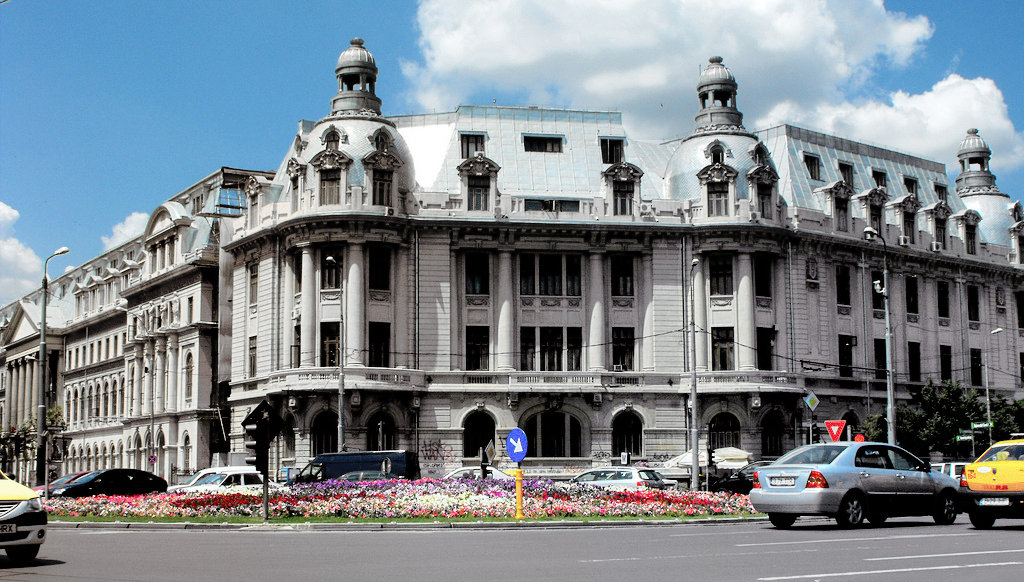
University of Bucharest

Education in Romania is based on a free-tuition, egalitarian system. Access to free education is guaranteed by Article 32 in the Constitution of Romania. Education is regulated and enforced by the Ministry of National Education. Each step has its own form of organization and is subject to different laws and directives.

Kindergarten is optional under the age of five. Compulsory schooling usually starts at age 4, with the second year of kindergarten (grupa mijlocie), which is mandatory in order to enter primary school. Schooling is compulsory until the twelfth grade (which corresponds with the age of eighteen or nineteen). The school educational cycle ends in the twelfth grade, when students graduate the baccalaureate. Higher education is aligned onto the European Higher Education Area. In addition to the formal system of education, to which was recently added the equivalent private system, there is also a system of tutoring, semi-legal and informal.

Romania ranks 6th in the all-time medal count at the International Mathematical Olympiad with 316 total medals, dating back to 1959. Ciprian Manolescu managed to write a perfect paper (42 points) for gold medal more times than anybody else in the history of the competition, doing it all three times he participated in the IMO (1995, 1996, 1997). Romania has achieved the highest team score in the competition, after China and Russia, and right after the United States and Hungary. Romania also ranks 6th in the all-time medal count at the International Olympiad in Informatics with 107 total medals, dating back to 1989.

The Human Rights Measurement Initiative (HRMI) finds that Romania is fulfilling only 65.1% of what it should be fulfilling for the right to education based on the country's level of income. HRMI breaks down the right to education by looking at the rights to both primary education and secondary education. While taking into consideration Romania's income level, the nation is achieving 48.5% of what should be possible based on its resources (income) for primary education and 81.6% for secondary education.

== Overview ==
Kindergarten (Pre-school)
Age	Grade	Type
3–4	Grupa mică	optional
4–5	Grupa mijlocie	compulsory
5–6	Grupa mare	compulsory
Primary school (Primary School)
Age	Grade	Type
6–7	Clasa pregătitoare	compulsory
7–8	Clasa I	compulsory
8–9	Clasa II	compulsory
9–10	Clasa III	compulsory
10–11	Clasa IV	compulsory
Gymnasium (Middle school)
Age	Grade	Type
11–12	Clasa V	compulsory
12–13	Clasa VI	compulsory
13–14	Clasa VII	compulsory
14–15	Clasa VIII	compulsory
Lyceum (Secondary School)
Age	Grade	Type
15–16	Clasa IX	compulsory
16–17	Clasa X	compulsory
17–18	Clasa XI	compulsory
18–19	Clasa XII	compulsory

Education in Romania is compulsory for 15 years (from the second year of the kindergarten to the twelfth grade). With the exception of kindergarten (preschool) and tertiary education (university), the private sector has a very low presence in the Romanian education system. Education became compulsory in Romania in the 19th century, in 1864, under ruler Alexandru Ioan Cuza, when four years of primary school became free and compulsory for all children, regardless of social class and sex. Despite this, the law was not enforced, and mass illiteracy persisted well into the 20th century: in the 1930s, 43% of adults were illiterate. The Romanian literacy campaigns started in 1948 largely eradicated illiteracy in the 1950s.

The education system of Romania resembles the French education system. During the communist era, it was influenced by the Soviet education system (especially in the 1950s), and it included political propaganda, as well as hours of compulsory physical work by school children (usually in agriculture).

As of April 2013, there were about 7,200 opened schools in Romania, a sharp drop from nearly 30,000 units in 1996. This is mainly because many schools were brought together in order to form bigger schools and eliminate paperwork. In the same year, 3.2 million students and preschoolers were enrolled in the educational system, 500,000 more than in 2012.

== Compulsory education ==
Literacy rate in Romania in 1930 (map shows the borders of Romania as they were in 1930).

Throughout the 20th century, compulsory education has oscillated between 4 years, 7 years, again 4 years, 7 years, 8 years, 10 years, and again 8 years. In the 21st century, it was raised to 10 years, then to 11 years, and then to 14 years. When the communists came into power in 1947, compulsory education was 7 years, but this was not enforced. Originally, the communist regime lowered compulsory education to 4 years, but with a strong enforcement. Next they increased it gradually to 7, 8 and ultimately 10 years. After the 1989 revolution, compulsory education was lowered again to 8 years. The new government cited as reasons the poor quality of education, high strain on the state budget, and inflation of diplomas. In 2003, compulsory education was raised again to 10 years, through Law nr. 268/2003, modifying Article 6 of Law nr. 84/1995.

During the 1990–2003 period, there was very little concern for education in Romania, and the generation who studied in this period is quite poorly trained, with illiteracy being higher than the previous generation, especially among the Roma population in rural areas. A new law come into force in 2011. This law came into force after years of political debate regarding not only the number of years in compulsory education, but also how they should be structured. The original form of the law, which would have moved the 9th grade to middle school, was never implemented.

With the adding of the preparatory school year as part of compulsory primary education in 2012, compulsory education consisted of 5 years of primary school, 4 of middle school/gymnasium and 2 of high school/vocation school. There were 2 more optional high school years. In 2020, the last year of kindergarten, as well as the last two years of high school were added to compulsory education, bringing compulsory education to a total of 14 years. The 2011 law was replaced by a new law in 2023, which added one more year of compulsory education, namely the middle form ("grupa mijlocie") of kindergarten.

== Kindergarten ==
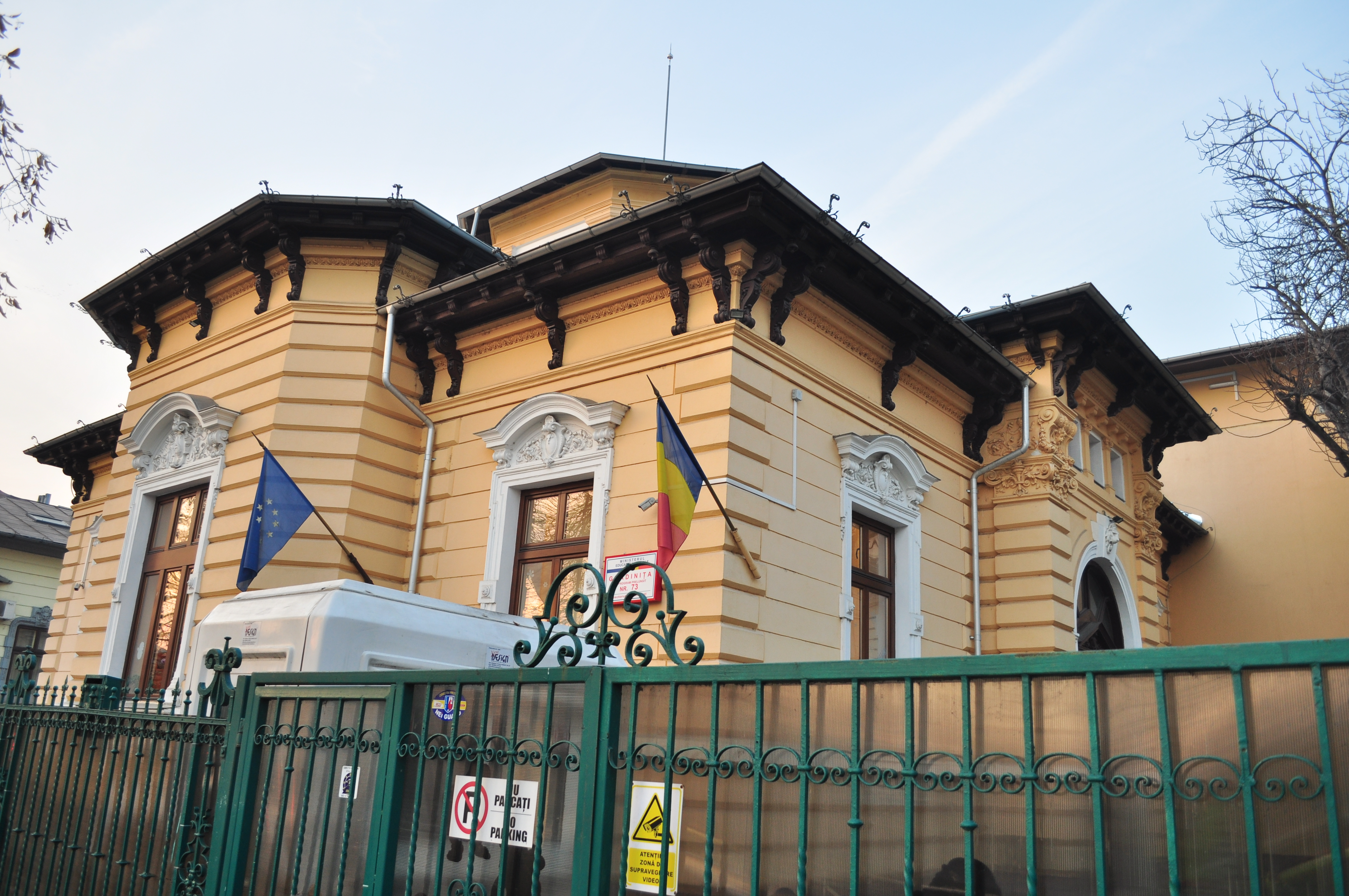
Kindergarten No. 73 on Splaiul Independenței, Bucharest.

Kindergartens offer preschool education for children (usually between ages 3–6) and typically last for 3 forms – "small group" (grupa mică) for children aged 3–4, "middle group" (grupa mijlocie), for children aged 4–5, and "big group" (grupa mare) for children aged 5–6, with this last form becoming compulsory in 2020, and the middle form becoming compulsory in 2023.

The "preparatory school year" (clasa pregătitoare) is for children aged 6–7, and since it became compulsory in 2012, it usually takes place at school. The preparatory school year has been a requirement in order to enter the first grade since 2012, being part of the primary education stage, according to Article 23 of the Education law no 1/2011 (Legea Educației Naționale nr.1/2011) and currently according to Article 31 of the Law 198/2023.

During the transition period after the law of 2012 was enacted, transfers of teachers occurred in order to fill in the educational needs of this year.

Kindergarten services differ from one kindergarten to another, and from public (state) to private ones, and may include initiation in foreign languages (typically English, French or German), introduction in computer studies, dancing, swimming, etc. All kindergartens provide at least one meal or one snack, some having their own kitchens and their own cooks, others opting for dedicated catering services. Many kindergartens (especially the private ones) provide children with transportation to and from kindergarten. Groups typically have 1–2 teachers (educatori) and 10–15 children (typically more in state kindergartens).

Most public kindergartens in urban areas offer parents three types of programs, in order to better suit the parents' schedules – a short schedule (typically 8 a.m. to 1 p.m., with one snack or meal), a medium schedule (typically 8 a.m. to 3 p.m., with one snack and one meal) and a long schedule (typically 8 a.m. to 5–6 p.m., with three snacks and one meal, and almost always including after lunch sleeping periods). In rural areas, most kindergartens only have a short schedule. Rural kindergartens also suffer from underfunding and neglect.

The private sector has a very large role in providing kindergarten and day care services, having a large proportion in the market share for preschool education. Typical tuition fees for private kindergarten range between 400 and 1,600 lei monthly, depending on the town/city where the institution is located and on the services offered, whereas for public kindergarten there is no tuition fee (some may, however, charge for meals and/or transportation). The private sector is quite expensive, catering to upper and upper-middle-class families.

The relative number of available places in kindergartens is small, many having waiting lists or requiring admission and formalities to be done at least six months in advance. The lack of available places is especially obvious in state-run kindergartens, that charge no tuition fees, especially given the relatively high tuition fees of private venues. Local councils, especially in larger cities (such as Bucharest or Sibiu), where both parents typically work, seeing an increase in demand, have begun investing in expanding existing kindergartens, building new ones or offering stipends for private kindergartens as to cover part of the tuition fees.

== Elementary school ==
Elementary school includes primary school (the preparatory school year and the next 4 grades of primary school) and then four more grades (grades 5–8 of gymnasium). Most elementary schools are public; the Ministry of Education's statistics show less than 2% of elementary school students attend private school. Unless parents choose a school earlier, the future student is automatically enrolled in the school nearest to his or her residence. Some schools that have a good reputation are flooded with demands from parents even two or three years in advance. A negative consequence of this is that in many schools classes are held in two shifts lasting from as early as 7 a.m. to as late as 8 p.m. Education is free in public schools (including some books), but not entirely (some textbooks, notebooks, writing instruments, consumables and uniforms may be required to be purchased).

School starts in the beginning of September and ends in the middle or end of June the following year. It is divided into five periods called modules, each followed by a holiday:

- Module 1, early September to late October.
- Fall holiday, late October to early November (one week).
- Module 2, early November to mid December.
- Winter holiday, mid December to early January (two weeks).
- Module 3, early January to February.
- Another winter holiday (ski holiday), one week sometime in February; depends on county.
- Module 4, February to April or May.
- Easter holiday, one to two weeks around Easter.
- Module 5, Late April or early May to mid June.
- Summer holiday, mid June to early September (around 3 months).

Additionally, each school decides when to organise the programmes Săptămâna altfel (Different Week) and Săptămâna Verde (Green Week).

A class (clasă) can have up to about 30 students (25 is considered optimum), and there can be as few as one class per grade or as many as twenty classes per grade. Usually, each group has its own classroom. Each group has its own designation, usually the grade followed by a letter of the alphabet (for example, VII A means that the student is in the 7th grade in the 'A' class). Primary schools commonly give them names, usually animals.

=== Grading conventions ===
For the first four years a system similar to E-S-N-U is used, known as calificative. These are Foarte bine (FB) – Excellent, Bine (B) – Good, Satisfăcător/Suficient (S) – Satisfactory, actually meaning (barely) passing, Nesatisfăcător/Insuficient (N/I) – Failed. Students who get an N/I must take an exam in the summer with a special assembly of teachers, and if the situation is not improved, the student will repeat the whole year. The "qualifiers" (calificative) are given throughout the year, in a system of year-long assessment, on tests, schoolwork, homework or projects. The average (medie) for each subject is decided by the teacher choosing the two most frequent qualifiers and choosing the one that better reflects the progress of the student or the results of a final evaluation.

For grades fifth to twelfth, a 1 to 10 grading system is used with 10 being the best, 1 being the worst and 5 being the minimum passing grade. The system of continuous assessment is also used, with individual marks for each test, oral examination, project, homework or classwork being entered in the register (catalog) (these individual marks are known as "note"). There must be at least as many marks for a subject as the number of weekly classes for that subject plus three. At the end of the school year, an average is computed for each subject using the arithmetical average of all marks.

The last step is adding all the yearly averages per subject (rounded to the nearest integer) and dividing that amount by the total number of subjects. This forms the yearly grade average (media generală). This is neither weighted nor rounded.

If the yearly average per subject is below 5 for a maximum of two subjects, then the student must take a special exam (corigență) at the failed subject in August, in front of a school board. If he fails this exam, he must repeat the entire year (repetenție). If the yearly average per subject is below 5 for three subjects or more, the student is no longer entitled to the special exam and must repeat the year.

=== Primary school ===
The "preparatory school year" became compulsory in 2012, and is a requirement in order to enter the first grade. According to Article 23 of the Education law no 1/2011 (Legea Educației Naționale nr.1/2011) the preparatory class is part of the primary school and is compulsory. Primary school classes are taught by a single teacher (învățător) for the most subjects. Additional teachers are assigned only for a few specialized subjects (modern languages, sport, etc.). At the end of primary school, curriculum is diversified. For instance, a 4th grade student (10–11 years of age) may have on a weekly basis:

- 4 classes of Math;
- 4–5 classes of Romanian Language and Literature;
- 1 class of History;
- 1 class of Geography;
- 1–2 classes of Natural Sciences;
- 1-2 classes of Plastic Education^{†} (visual arts);
- 1–3 classes of a foreign language (usually French, English, or German)^{†};
- 1 class of Civic Education (a subject teaching everything from personal hygiene to the Constitution and manners in society);
- 1 class of Religion^{†} (optional; following a 2014 decision of the Constitutional Court of Romania parents (or legal guardians) of students (or students over 18) who want to study religion must submit an application for this class. Before 2014, all students were enrolled automatically, unless their parents opted-out, with pressure to attend being high.)
- 1 class of Music Education;
- 2 classes of Physical Education^{†}.
- 1 class of an optional subject (without calificative)
- The schedule is 22–30 hours long.

Notes:
^{†} These subjects commonly have teachers other than the main teacher.

=== Gymnasium ===
Classes are reshaped at the end of the 4th grade, often based on academic performances. Many schools have special classes (such as intensive English classes or Informatics classes, providing one or two more courses in these subjects). Selection for such classes is done based on local tests. Assessing the students' performance is also different between primary and gymnasium cycles. Starting with the 5th grade, students have a different teacher (profesor) for each subject. Furthermore, each class has a teacher designated to be class principal (diriginte), besides teaching his or hers usual subject. Additional counseling may be provided by a special counselor (consilier pe probleme de educație – counselor on educational issues) or by a school psychologist.

An 8th grade schedule may contain up to 30–32 hours weekly, or 6 hours daily, thus making it quite intensive, for instance:

- 4 classes of Math (algebra and geometry);
- 4 classes of Romanian Language and Literature;
- 2 (5th and 8th grades) or 1 (6th and 7th grades) classes of History;
- 2 (8th grade) or 1 (other grades) classes of Geography;
- 2 (1 in the 5th and 8th grades) classes of Biology;
- 1 class of Informatics and ICT;
- 2-3 classes of a main foreign language, usually English;
- 2 classes of a second foreign language, usually French or German;
- 2 classes of Physics (not in the 5th grade);
- 2 classes of Chemistry (not in the 5th and 6th grades);
- 1 class of Latin Language (only in 7th grade);
- 1 class of Plastic Education;
- 1 class of Musical Education;
- 1 class of Religion (optional);
- 1 class of Civic Education;
- 1 class of Technological Education;
- 2 classes of Physical Education.
- 1 class of counseling with the diriginte called dirigenție.
- 1 or 2 classes decided by the school called Curriculum la decizia școlii.

=== Curriculum in elementary schools ===
There are up to 15 compulsory subjects (usually 8–13) and up to 5 optional subjects (usually 1 or 2). However, unlike in the United Kingdom or France, these optional subjects are chosen by the school and imposed on the student – they are known as School Decided Curriculum (Curriculum la Decizia Școlii – CDȘ) and are usually extensions to the compulsory subjects.

For the duration of the elementary school, each student must take:

- 8 years of mathematics, Romanian, music, art and physical education;
- up to 8 years of religion (usually Eastern Orthodox; some other religions or denominations also accepted, optional);
- 5 years of geography and history;
- 6 years in the first foreign language (usually English, French, or German);
- 4 years in the second foreign language (usually French, English, German, very seldom Spanish, Italian, Russian or Portuguese);
- 4 years of civic education;
- 2 years of science (if we don't include Environmental Knowledge which is 2 years);
- 4 years of biology;
- 3 years of physics;
- 2 years of chemistry;
- 1 year of Latin language;
- 4 years of IT (optionally)

== High schools ==
=== Admission to high school ===
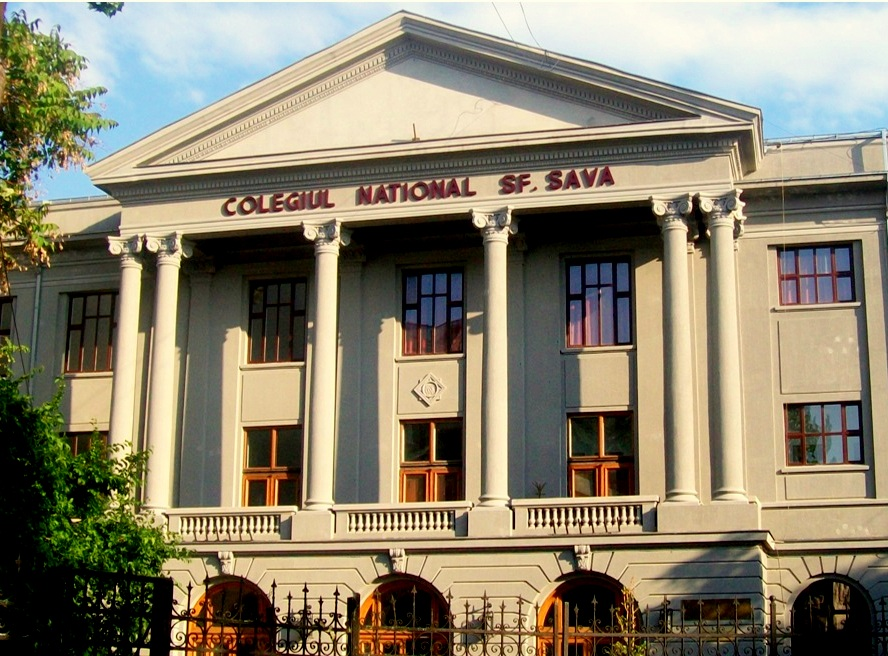
Saint Sava National College, one of the most prestigious high schools in Romania.

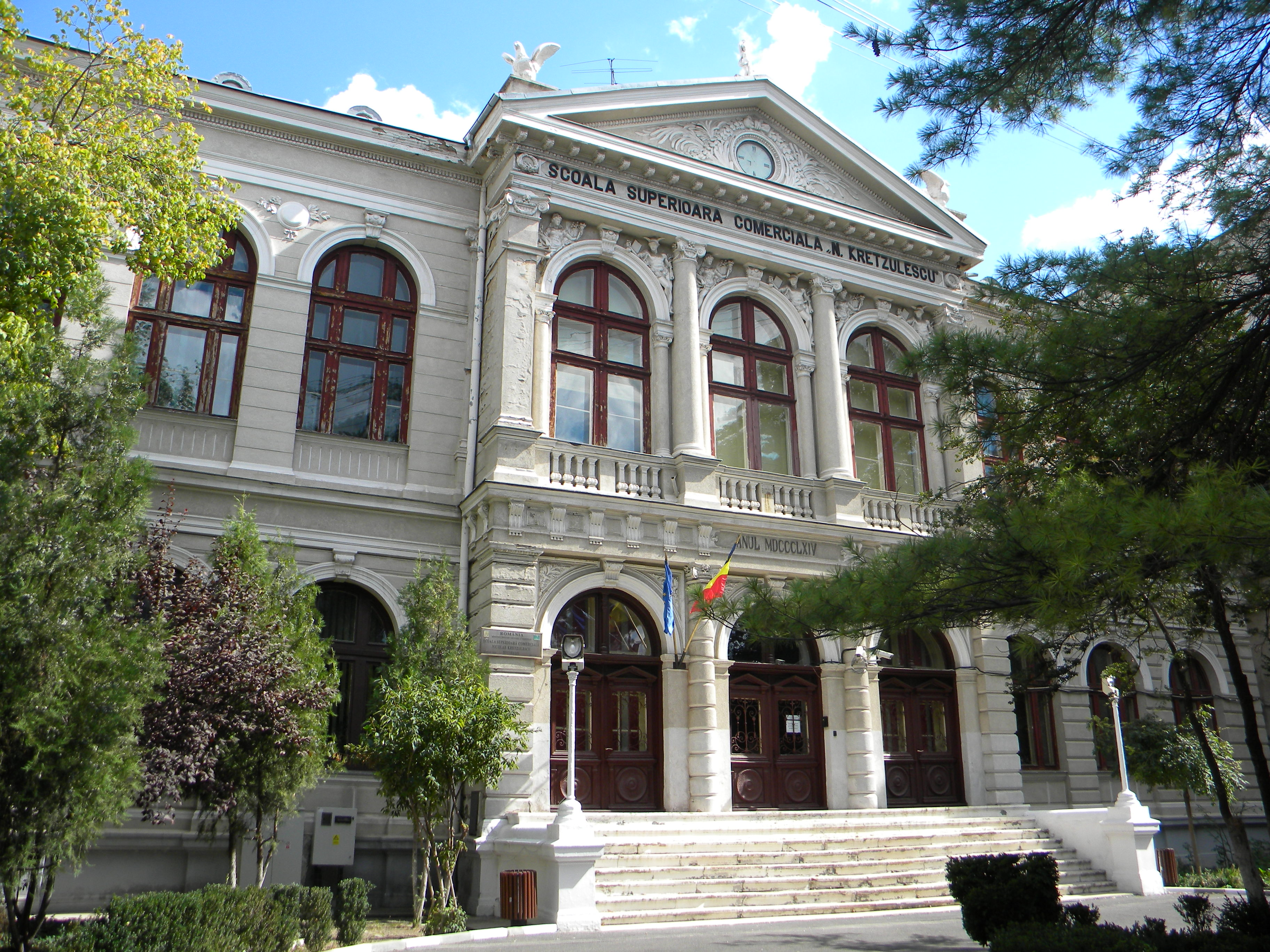
Școala Superioară Comercială "Nicolae Kretzulescu", a high school specialized in economic studies.

At the end of the 8th grade (usually corresponding to age 14 or 15) a nationwide test is taken by all students called Evaluarea Națională (The National Test) also known as Examen de Capacitate (Capacity Exam) and can be taken only once, in June. The subjects are Romanian Language and Literature and Mathematics (and additionally the language of the school for ethnic minority schools or classes and for bi-lingual schools). Many high schools provide classes with intensive study of a foreign language, such as English, French, German or Spanish; a two-part examination (Grammar/Vocabulary and Speaking) is required for them. The passing mark is 5 for each of the exams. The finishing grade (also known as the admission grade) is computed as the average of the grade of each exam.

The Mathematics exam has half algebra and half geometry, and the Romanian Language and Literature exam has a section with tasks based on a literary and a nonliterary text, one with grammar exercises and one with a writing task. The exam marks were public, with results lists being placed both in schools and on the Internet until 2020, when the student's names were replaced with examination codes. After the 8th grade, students go to secondary education; since 2020, all four years are compulsory. Various types of vocational schools exist in Romania for students who do not have a sufficiently high grade to enter academic high school, because secondary education is compulsory. Between 2003 and 2010, the main type of such education were Schools of Crafts and Trades (Școli de Arte și Meserii), but these have been abolished. The structure of vocational education is under constant reform, in an attempt to be connected to the work market.

In order to enroll in a high school, the student must choose a list of high schools he or she desires to attend (there is no automatic enrolment this time), based on his mark and options by filling in a nationwide form. A national computer system does the repartition, by taking into account students in the order of their preferences and their "admission grade". Thus, somebody with a 9.85 average (this is a top 5% mark) will certainly enter the high school he or she desires, while somebody with 5.50 has almost no chance to attend a top-ranked high school. However, based on this system, the last admission averages for some prestigious high schools are over 9.50 or 9.60.

There are five types of high schools in Romania allowing access to university, based on the type of education offered and their academic performance. All of these allow for a high school diploma, access to the Bacalaureat exam and therefore access to University studies. Unlike the Swedish or French systems, the choice of high school curriculum does not limit the choices for university. For example, a graduate of a Mathematics-Computer Programming (Real) Department of a National College may apply to a Language Department of a University without any problem. However, because of the subjects taught, the quality of education and the requirements for admission in universities, artificial barriers may appear: for example, a graduate of a Humane and Social Studies Department will find it very hard to apply for a Mathematics Department at a University because the admission exam for that university department requires knowledge of calculus, a subject not taught in Humanities and Social Studies. But there is no formal limitation: if that student manages to understand calculus, they are free to apply.

High school enrollment is conditioned on passing the National Test and participating in the National Computerized Repartition.

High school studies are four years in length, all four years compulsory since 2020. There are no exams between the 10th and the 11th years. There is also a lower frequency program taking 5 years for those wishing to attend high school after abandoning at an earlier age.

The Romanian secondary education system includes:

- National College (Colegiu Național) — the most prestigious high schools in Romania, most are each part of at least one international program such as Cervantes, SOCRATES, Eurolikes etc. All are "theoretical" (see below). Some of them are over 100 years old, and have a very strong tradition in education: Saint Sava National College in Bucharest (1818), National College in Iași (1828), Andrei Șaguna National College (Brașov) (1850), Gheorghe Lazăr National College, Bucharest (1860), “Ion Luca Caragiale” National College in Ploiești (1864), Mihai Eminescu National College, Iași (1865), Mihai Viteazul National College, Bucharest (1865), Ion C. Brătianu National College in Pitești (1866), Vasile Alecsandri National College, Galați (1867), Roman-Voda National College in Roman (1872), Frații Buzești National College in Craiova (1882), Stefan cel Mare National College Suceava, Costache Negruzzi National College, Iași (1895), Mircea cel Bătrân National College in Constanța (1896). Other, newer, national colleges are Tudor Vianu National College of Computer Science Bucharest, Emil Racoviță National College Iași, Carol I National College Craiova, Barbu Știrbei National College Călărași, Mihai Eminescu National College Constanța, National College of Computer Science in Piatra Neamț, National College Gheorghe Vrănceanu Bacau etc.
- Theoretical High School (Liceu Teoretic) — An average high school, providing one or more of the available academic programs. They are very common and vary greatly in quality and results. They usually (but not always) offer both the real (math-informatics, natural sciences) and uman (languages, social studies) sections; or they may be specialized (i.e. arts, music, sports).
- Military College (Colegiu Militar) — there are 3 high schools administered by the Ministry of National Defense. They are considered extremely strict and legally they have the same regime as army units, being considered military installations with all students being members of the army and abiding army rules and regulations, including lights out at 10 o'clock. The Military Colleges are Colegiul Militar Liceal Mihai Viteazu in Alba Iulia, Colegiul Militar Liceal Ștefan cel Mare in Câmpulung Moldovenesc and Colegiul Militar Liceal Dimitrie Cantemir in Breaza.
- Economic College or Technical College (Colegiu Economic or Colegiu Tehnic) — A high school with an academic program based on services or technical education and good results. An admission average of 8.00 is usually enough.
- Liceu Tehnologic — A type of high school (usually offering academic programmes in the field of technical or services education). Some are regarded as being the worst alternative to allow access to a highschool diploma and access to university, while others are very well regarded as they give highly useful and well-regarded diplomas and provide a rather high-quality.
- Învățământul profesional-dual: a type of 3-years high school focused on vocational training and apprenticeship; after graduating from this school it is possible for the student to transfer to a technological high school and graduate with a Baccalaureate diploma. Very few students attend such schools, and parents are often skeptical about them.

=== Curriculum in high school ===
Each type of high-school is free to offer one or more academic programs (profile). These are:

Theoretical program

- Science — Profil Real — this is the most demanding of all the academic programs, and the most sought after by the students who want to get S.T.E.M.-related degrees. It is divided in two sections, both offering classes suited accordingly:
  - Intensive Mathematics and Informatics — Mate-info which provides more classes of math and computer programming (up to 7-8 hours per week each)
  - Natural Sciences — Științe ale naturii which extends knowledge in biology, chemistry and physics (up to 3 or 4 hours per week each).
- Humanities — Profil Uman ("social studies" or "philology") — emphasises languages, geography, history and other non-sciences. It is also divided in two sections:
  - Philology — Filologie which focuses on Literature and foreign languages classes. Training in mathematics is provided for 9th and 10th grade (2 hours per week).
  - Social Studies — Științe sociale which has more hours reserved for classes such as History, Sociology, and Psychology. Training in Mathematics is provided for all 4 years of High School (2 hours per week).

Both science and humanities can provide bilingual programs (extended hours in a second language) which reward the students with a translator's diploma. The Math and Computer programming branch can also provide an intensive course in programming which also ends with a diploma. These are not, however, available at every highschool (different schools decide their own programs) and the majority of students make their highschool choice based on what classes they want to take. Every student has a fair chance of entering a higher level of education regardless of the chosen profile.

Technical programs — Profil tehnic will give a qualification in a technical field such as electrician, industrial machine operator, train driver, and mechanic, etc. A lot of subjects are technically based (e.g. Calibration of Technical Measurement Machines, Locomotive Mechanics), with some math, physics and chemistry and almost no humanities.

Natural resources and the protection of the environment programs — Profil resurse naturale si protectia mediului, will give a qualification in agriculture, sylviculture, protection of the environment, food industry. Like the technical programs, it is focused more on training for a job, and is lighter on academics.

Vocational programs — Profil vocațional will give a qualification in a non-technical field, such as kindergarten educator, assistant architect, or pedagogue. Many subjects are based on humanities, with specifics based on qualification (such as Teaching) and almost no math, physics or chemistry. Art, music, and design high schools are grouped here. High schools belonging to religious cults are also included. Usually, admission in these high schools is done by a special exam besides the National Tests in music or art.

Services and Economics programs — Profil economic will give a qualification in the fields of services, such as an economic, tourist, commerce, administrative operator, or a waiter, chef, offering a diverse program. Some economic high schools, such as Colegiul Economic Virgil Madgearu (Bucharest), are more academically focused, while others focus more on vocational specializations.

The following high-schools forms (no longer existing) did not allow entrance to universities:

- School of Crafts and Trades (Școală de Arte și Meserii) — a two-year school providing a low qualification such as salesman or welder or builder. In case the student wants to continue to high school he or she must attend a special year between the 2nd year in the School of Crafts and Trades, and the 11th year in high school. These types of schools were abolished in 2010.
- Apprentice School — a two-year school, almost integrally based on apprenticeship with a company, that usually also hires the graduates. Once highly popular, they were phased out by 2009. There is no access to high school from this type of school.

Optional subjects are either imposed by schools on the students or, at best, students are allowed to choose a package of two or three subjects at group level (not individual level). Usually optional subjects provide additional hours of the hardest subjects, through "extensions" and "development classes". Some high schools may offer unique classes (e.g. History of Film ) In addition, there are also a large number of specializations. A student can be, for example, enrolled in a National College, study a real program, specializing in mathematics-informatics.

=== The Baccalaureate exam ===
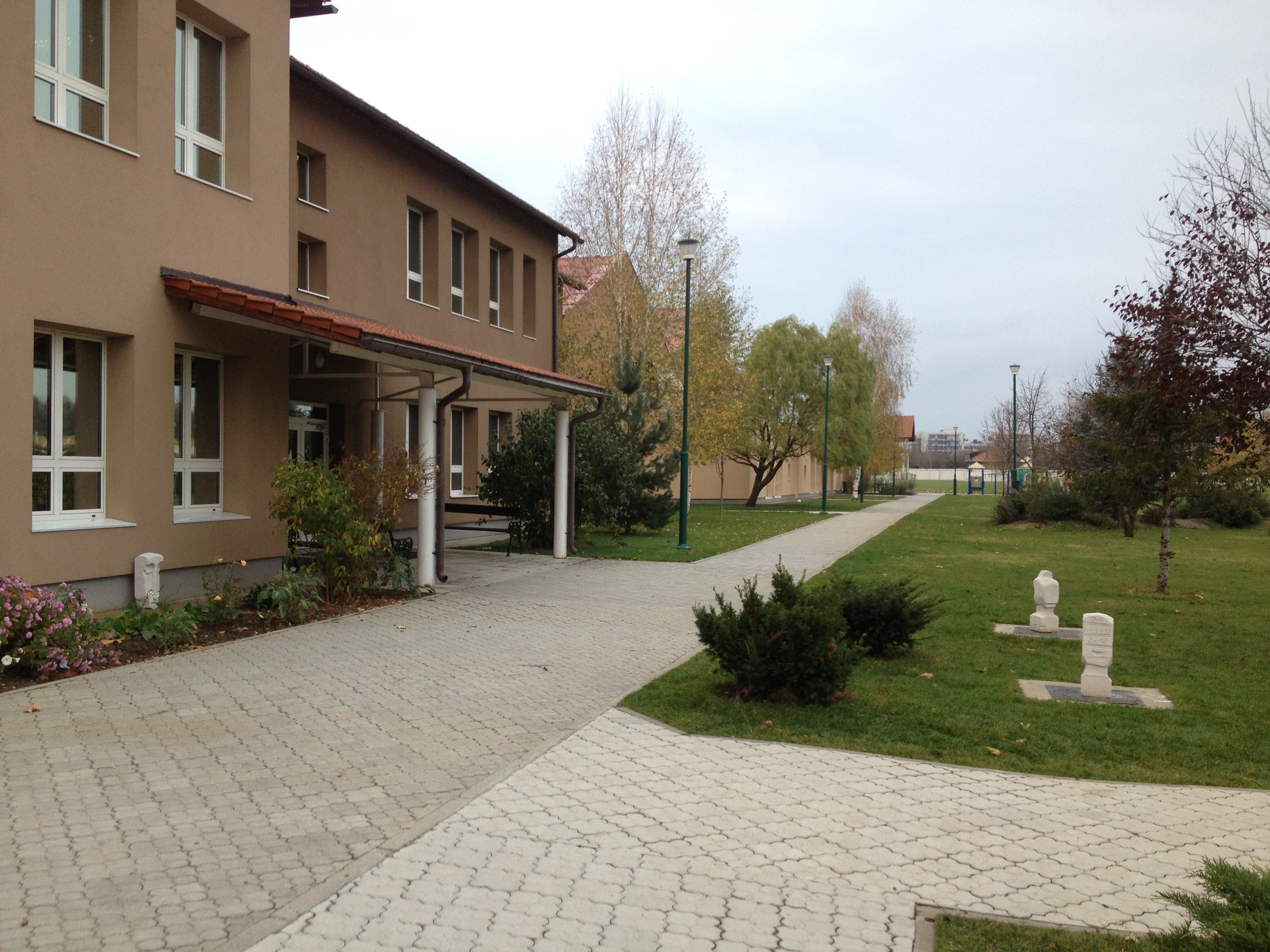
The American International School of Bucharest, an international school in Voluntari which offers the International Baccalaureate program.

High school students graduating from a College, Liceu or Grup Școlar must take the National Baccalaureate Exam (Examenul Național de Bacalaureat — colloquially known as the bac). Despite the similarity in name with the French word Baccalauréat, there are few similarities. The Bacalaureat comprises 2 or 3 oral examinations and 4 or 5 written examinations, usually spanning the course of one and a half weeks in late June and September. It is a highly centralized, national exam. Since 2023, the grading is digitalised, and each exam room is equipped with a scanner that is used to upload the papers to a centralised platform where they will be given to a random high school teacher to grade them.

The 6 exams are :

- Exam A/1 (Proba A/1) — Romanian Language and Literature (Oral Examination) — The candidate draws a literature subject at random and a text comprehension subject, also at random. The candidate has 15 minutes "thinking time" and 10 minutes to answer the questions in front of three people. The exam is public.
- Exam C/1 (Proba C/1) — The language of study in a school where the teaching is done in a language other than Romanian (usually the language of an ethnic group) — organized exactly like Exam A/1. C/1 is taken only by those taught in another language than Romanian.
- Exam B (Proba B) — A foreign language (Oral Examination) — The candidate is allowed to choose from English, French, German, Italian, Spanish, Portuguese and Russian. The choice must be done upon registration for the exam (usually in May) and cannot be changed. The candidate draws one subject with two questions (reading comprehension and speaking) at random, and has 15 minutes thinking time to construct his answers and 10 minutes to answer.
- Exam A/2 (Proba A/2) — Romanian Language and Literature (Written Examination) — Usually an essay upon a literature theme (such as "Show the features of the modern twentieth century novel with examples on a studied work") and a text with 9 questions based on the text (such as "Find a metaphor and an oxymoron in the text" or "Comment the following passage in ten lines or less"). Half an hour before the start of the exam, the Minister Of Education draws the correct variant on TV, with sealed envelopes containing 20 or 25 exam papers being delivered to the exam rooms and opened in front of the students. According to law, each student must receive an exam paper, writing the subjects on the board being no longer allowed. Exam C was 2 hours long in 2005, 2004 and 2003 and 3 hours long since 2002.
- Exam C/2 (Proba C/2) — The language of study in a school where the teaching is done in a language other than Romanian (usually the language of an ethnic group) — written examination — organized exactly like Exam A/2.
- Exam D (Proba D) — Compulsory subject depending on the academic program followed in high school (Written Examination) — This translates to math for those finishing a real studies, technical or services program or Romanian History for a humane studies or vocational program. However, the difficulty of the exam varies between the academic program followed in high school (e.g. a candidate that was enrolled in a real studies program in high school will receive a Mathematics 1 subject — the hardest math subjects, including algebra, simple calculus, trigonometry and geometry, while a former services student will receive a Mathematics 2 subject — a simpler subject, featuring only algebra and simple calculus). Unlike in western exams, calculators, slide rules or any other assistance is forbidden. Exam D is 3 hours long.
- Exam E (Proba E) — Subject at the choice of the candidate from the domains considered as the main part of the Academic Program followed in high school (Written Examination) — This gives the student more choice depending on the academic program completed. For example, a real studies student may choose from Physics, Computer Programming, Chemistry( the student can choose between organic and inorganic chemistry) and Biology( the student can choose between the biology taught in the first 2 years of high school or the last 2 years ) and, a technical student/railway mechanic may choose Physics, Mechanical Instruments and Machines, Technical Instruments and Measures or Railway Maintenance while a human studies/languages may choose from Geography, Economics, Psychology, Philosophy and Logics. The same rules apply as in the case of Exam D, with one exception — students choosing Basic Accounting (Services Program) may use an account sheet describing the function of each account.

Except for the languages exams, the subjects are provided in any language desired by the candidate (demands can be made "on the spot" for a number of languages — Hungarian, German and Romanian subjects are available in all high schools nationwide, with other languages in areas where the respective language is spoken, while for other languages the request must be filed alongside the registration form, two months in advance). Braille can also be provided.

Each exam (Proba) is marked from 1 to 10 with 10 being the best, using two decimals for written exams (e.g. 9.44 or 9.14 is a valid mark) and an integer for an oral exam. Each exam is corrected and graded by two separate correctors (no computers are involved, as this is not a standardized test) agreeing on the mark based on a nationwide guideline. The total mark for the Bacalaureat is the arithmetic mean average of the six or eight marks obtained (0.01 precision). To pass, a student must obtain an average score of at least 6.00 and at least 5.00 at each of the individual exams. A student scoring a perfect 10 will be awarded with special honors (Absolvent cu Merite Deosebite), a monetary award from the government and in the last few years free entrance at two of the biggest music festivals in the country (Untold Festival and Neversea Festival). In July 2018, 132 candidates out of a total 123,619 scored a perfect 10 (0.11%) while 86.162 (69.70%) students passed the Bacalaureat. In case of failure (respins), the student is allowed to retake only the exams he failed, until he manages to graduate but no more than 5 times. A September session is held especially for those failing in the June/July session or for those unable to attend the exam in the summer. In case a student is not content with the mark received, one may contest it in 24 hours after finding his or her score. If passed, unlike the case with most high school completion exams, he or she may not retake it (although this matters less in Romania than in the United States or Germany).

The Baccalaureate is a requirement when enrolling in a university, because, technically, without passing it, the student is not a high school graduate. However, the importance of the actual admission score varies between universities, with its relevance being minimal for universities that require a separate entrance exam.

== Foreign languages ==
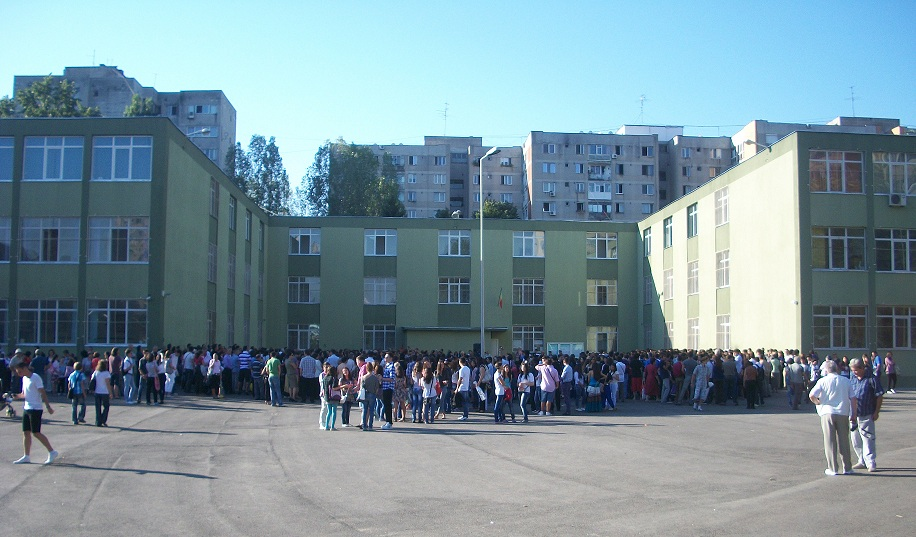
Eugen Lovinescu High School, a Bucharest school offering courses in Portuguese language, a rare option for a foreign language (English, French and German are the most common options for foreign languages taught in schools).

Foreign languages are part of the school curriculum in Romania, with children starting the first foreign language in primary school, and the second foreign language in the 5th grade. In the 19th century and the first part of the 20th century, Romania was strongly influenced by French culture, and, as such, French language was integrated in the education system. During the communist regime, Russian language featured prominently.

After the fall of the communist regime, French became again the first foreign language to be taught in schools during the 1990s, with English usually being the second language. In the 21st century, English increasingly became the first foreign language, with French usually being the second foreign language. Other languages commonly taught in schools are German (especially in the region of Transylvania), and, more rarely, Spanish and Italian. Other options may be available in big cities. Some schools offer bilingual classes or classes where a foreign language is studied 'intensively'.

The Latin language is taught in the 7th grade and in high school for some profiles. Almost all secondary education students in Romania study (either as first or as second foreign language) English language (99.4% of students in secondary education), which is followed by French language (84.6% of students) and German language (10.7% of students).

== Students' life in Romanian schools ==
In Romania, there are major differences between rural and urban areas with regard to educational opportunities. These begin early on: while the offer of preschool education is quite rich in big cities, including public kindergartens as well as various types of private kindergartens, this is not the case in rural areas. Many villages have improvised facilities, with very poor conditions, and suffer from a lack of teachers. Life in a city school is very different from life in a rural school. Urban schools are much larger, and usually have over 100 or 200 students per year, science labs and well-stocked computer labs, clubs based on different interests (math, film, art or drama), teaching assistants and psychologists, free speech therapy and academic programs for gifted students. By contrast, rural schools are usually tiny, with some, in villages, providing only 4 years education (the rest being offered at a nearby larger village) having only one teacher for all students (generally under 10 students in total) – a situation almost identical to the one existing at the turn of the 20th century. Transportation to and from school is almost never provided – and in extreme cases, in remote villages, students as young as six must walk up to 10 km to school if there is no bus or train. Only starting in 2003 was a very limited rural transportation service introduced (the yellow school minibus with a little bell – microbuzul școlar galben cu clopoțel). Public transport for all students is in theory free, but, because of a very awkward system, students end up paying half the price for a season ticket. Pre-university students also benefit from free tickets for all commuter trains operated by Căile Ferate Române.

Most schools follow the tradition of school shifts (originally done for lack of space, but now tradition). Thus, school starts for some groups (usually years I to IV and VIII) at 7:30 or 8:00 and ends at 12:00–14:30, while other groups (years V–VII) start at 11:00–13:30 and end at 17:00–19:30. Normally, a class lasts 50 minutes, followed by a 10-minute break (and sometimes one 20-minute break). From November until March, some schools reduce classes to 45 minutes and breaks to 5 minutes, for fear that 6:30 or 7:30 in the evening is a too late and a too dangerous hour to leave school during the dark. School days are Monday to Friday.

Public schools do not usually serve lunch and thus lack a cafeteria, although in recent years after-school programs that may include lunch have been introduced. There are also private after-school programs in urban areas.

Both urban and rural schools may organize clubs, but this is left to teachers. Dance clubs, school sports, traditions and story telling, drama, music, applied physics or chemistry and even math clubs are popular, depending on the teachers organizing. However, participation in these clubs will not be mentioned on any diploma or certificate, nor is it required. Contests between schools exist, as well as nationwide academic contests (known as olimpiade – olympiads) being used to promote the best students. These contests are highly popular, as they bring many advantages to the students taking part in them (like the ability to legally skip school for a longer period of time without punishment, easier evaluation at all other subjects, a different, better treatment from teachers, free trips and holidays, better preparation for the final exams – as these are structured like an exam) with whole classes taking part in the lower phase of such contests. Some olympiads may grant the student the ability to skip the National Test.

Additionally, many Physical Education teachers organize intramural competitions and one or two day trips to the mountains. Other teachers usually also organize such trips and even whole holidays during the summer – camps (tabere) – this being a Romanian school tradition. However, field trips or research trips are not common (one or two every year), and are usually visits to museums or trips to natural habitats of various animals or plants, to gather information for a school project.

As stated above, most high schools are in urban areas; because of this many rural school children, who must commute to school, end up abandoning school.

Most of the rules and regulations of elementary school apply to high schools, too. Uniforms are a local issue, according with each school's policies. Few high schools have uniforms, and in case they do, these are only used on special occasions (such as festivities, conferences, sporting contests etc.). Many high schools have their own magazines etc.

Unlike the elementary school, there are no clear guidelines for marking. That means that typically grade averages are not comparable betweens schools or even between different teachers in the same school. The communication between students and teachers is minimal. Usually students have no decision-making powers in the running of their high school, and school councils are rare. All administrative decisions are taken by one of the principals (Director). Usually, each high school has at least two principals.

School uniforms are not compulsory in Romania. However, each school is allowed to set its own dress code, which may include a uniform. Such decisions must be taken together with the parents. Usually, the younger the students are, the more likely they are to be required to wear a uniform. As such, most primary schools (preparatory grade to fourth grade) have a uniform. In recent years, school uniforms have become more common for middle schools, and even some high schools have introduced them. School uniforms are more common in urban areas. School uniforms are not without controversy. Critics argue that some parents cannot afford them, that some schools send children at home or lower their grades if they do not comply (this practice has been ruled illegal), or that there are illicit agreements between school administration and clothes producers. The 2018 regulations state explicitly that children cannot be punished or denied access to education for not wearing a uniform.

== Higher education ==
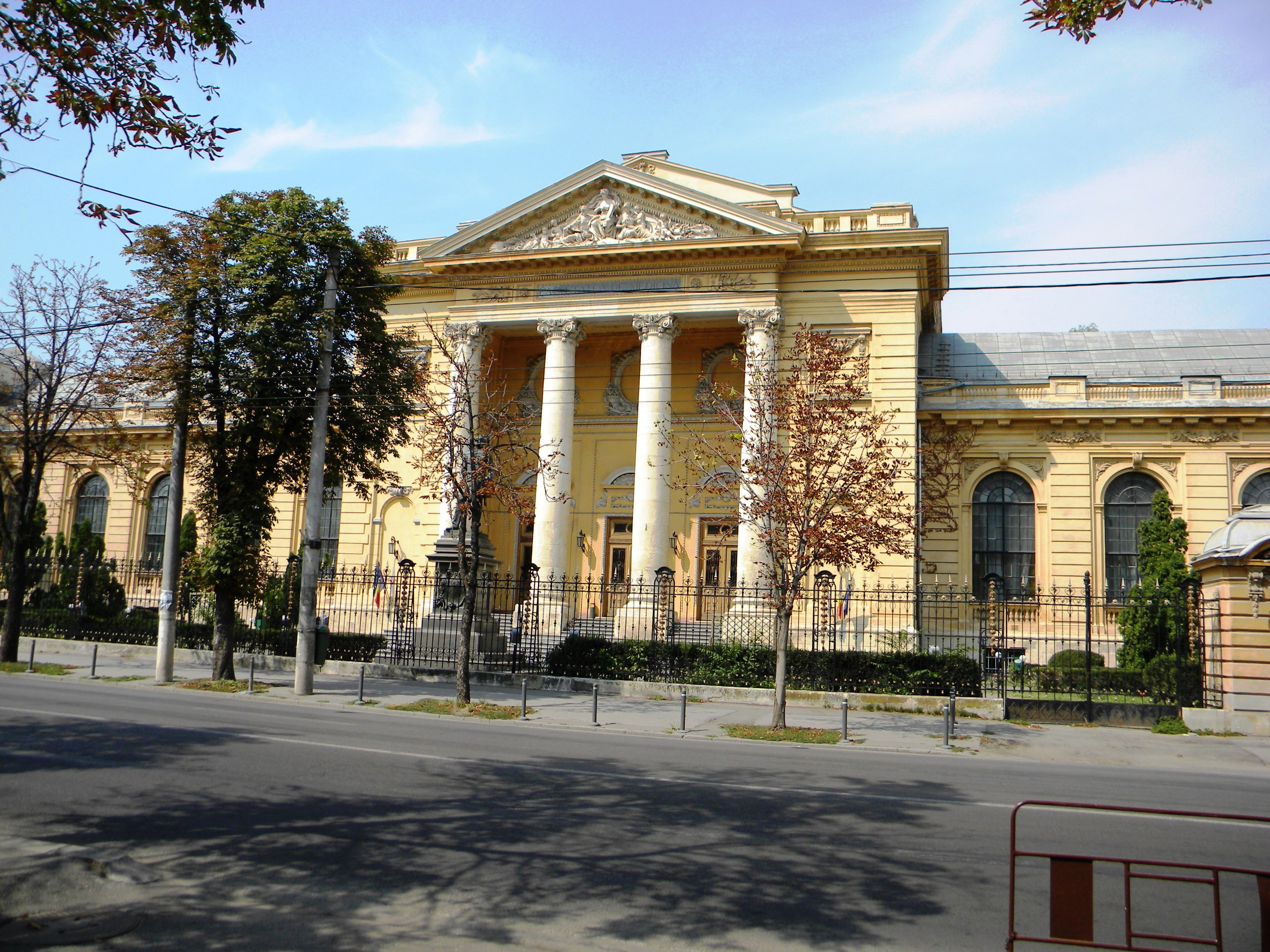
Carol Davila University of Medicine and Pharmacy

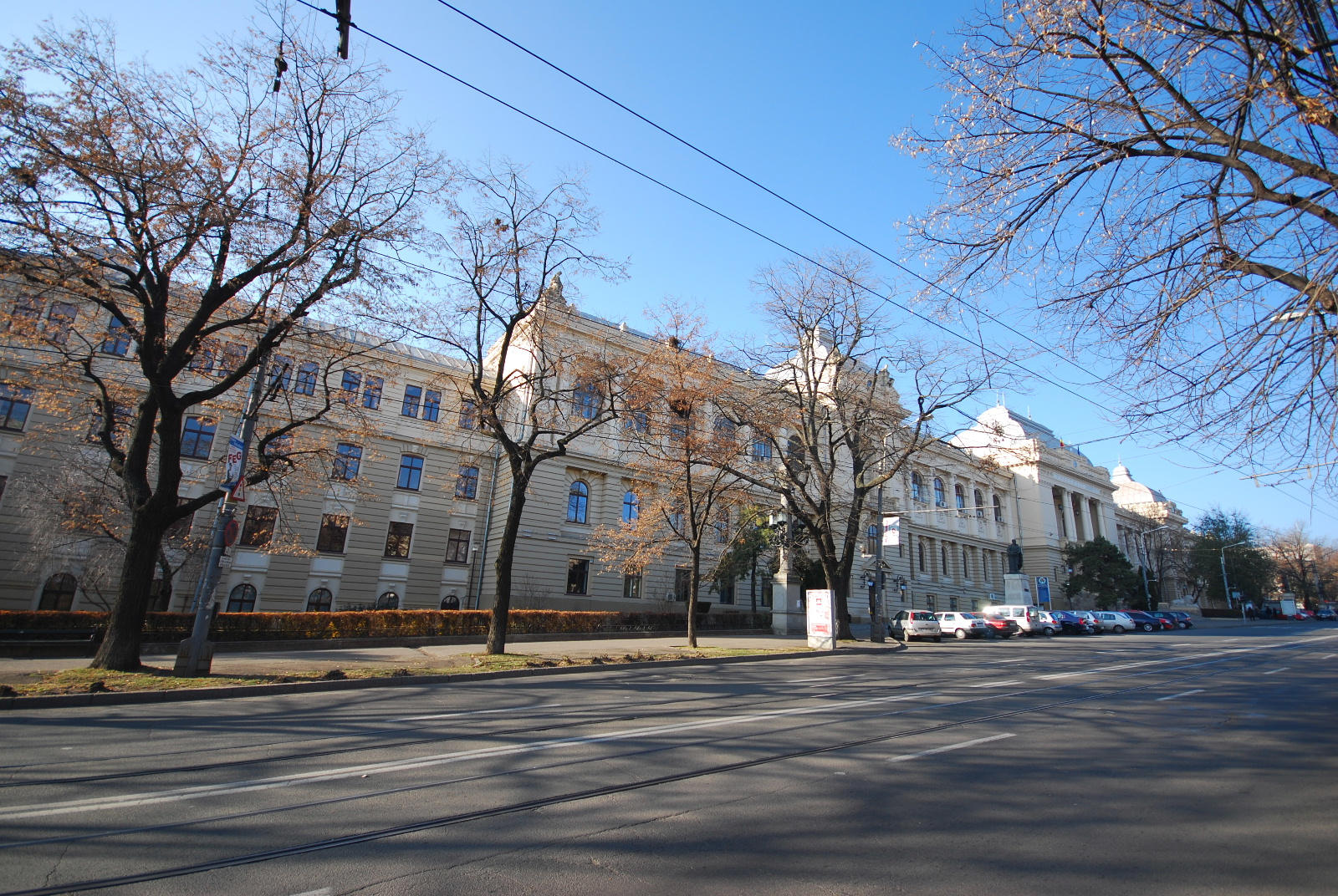
University of Iași (Alexandru Ioan Cuza University)

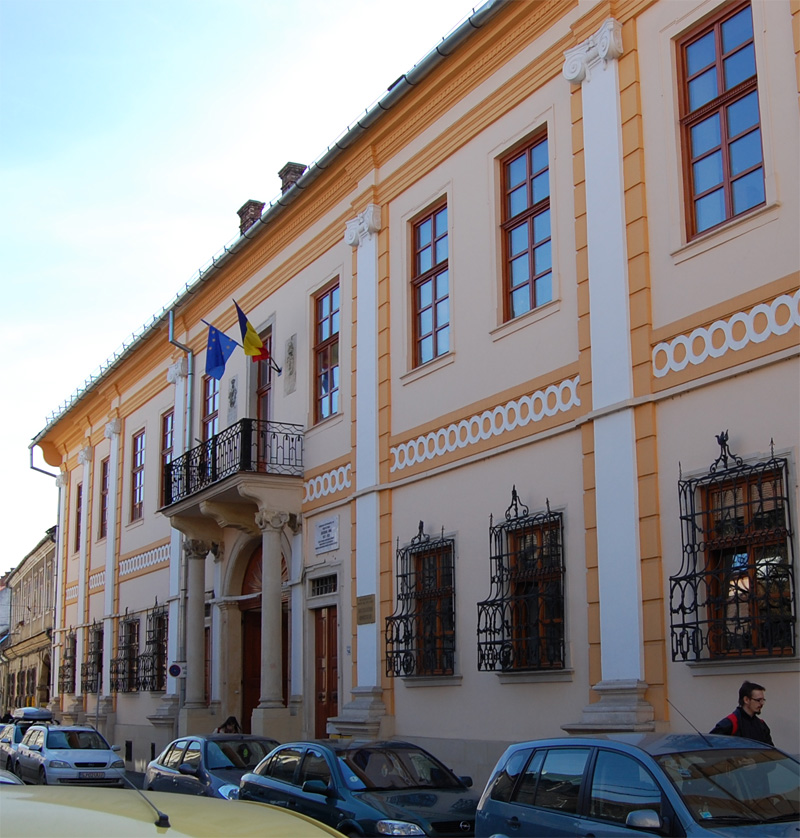
Tholdalagy-Korda Palace, the headquarters of technical administration of the Babeș-Bolyai University, in Cluj-Napoca

In Romania, higher education is provided by universities, institutes, study academies, schools of higher education, and other similar establishments, collectively referred to as higher education institutions (HEIs) or universities. HEIs can be state-owned or private; they are non-profit, apolitical in nature and focused on the public interest. Romania has a central government office that authorizes and approves educational institutions. The Romanian Ministry of Education is the national institution to which all higher education institutions look for guidance and report to.

There are 56 accredited public institutions, and 41 private ones (as of 2016). Universities are divided into three tiers:

- Universities focusing on education;
- Universities focusing on education and scientific research, and universities focusing on education and art;
- Universities with an advanced research and education focus.

Based on this classification, the Ministry of Education has published a detailed ranking of Romanian universities. Some of the most prominent Romanian universities are also the oldest modern Romanian universities:

- University of Iași (Alexandru Ioan Cuza University) (1860)
- University of Bucharest (1864)
- University of Cluj (Babeș-Bolyai University) (1919)

Romania follows the Bologna scheme and most of its tertiary level programmes is made of three cycles: a three-year bachelor's degree, followed by a two-year master's degree, and a three-year doctoral's degree. However, some programmes take longer to complete, for example those in engineering fields (four-year programmes), or some bachelor's and master's degree are combined into a unique six-year programme (medicine, and architecture). Master's programs are a prerequisite for admission to PhD programs. Vocational education is handled by post-secondary schools with programmes lasting two years.

The entire system is based on the European Credit Transfer and Accumulation System (ECTS). Since multiple-major programs are not available at Romanian universities, a student wishing to specialize in several areas of study is allowed to simultaneously attend several universities as a full-time student. Accreditation and diploma certification is in the hands of the National Center for Diploma Certification and Equivalency,Home | CNRED and ARACIS, the Romanian Agency for Quality Assurance in Higher Education, both coordinated by the Ministry of Education.

In 2016, 531,586 students were enrolled in Romanian's 97 universities, in all three cycles, of which 464,642 were in public institutions. 76.3% of the students were enrolled in the first cycle (bachelor level), 20.1% in the second cycle (master level) and 3.6% in the third cycle (doctoral studies).

Romanian universities have historically been classified among the best in Eastern Europe and have attracted international students, especially in the fields of medicine and technology. Foreign students accounted for 27,510 (5.1% of enrollment, as of 2016).

Universities have full autonomy, in stark contrast from the pre-university segment. Each university is free to decide everything from their management to the organization of classes. Furthermore, many universities devolve this autonomy further down, to each department.

The Ministry of Education established the National Authority for Scientific Research (Autoritatea Națională pentru Cercetare Științifică). This agency emerged from specific requirements designed to promote the development of a knowledge-based society. As in the other Eastern European countries, the Romanian higher education system has witnessed major transformations after 1990, in order to adapt its national educational framework to the European Union.

=== Admission ===
The admission process is left to the Universities, and there is no integrated admission scheme. As such, the admission requirements vary between universities and different fields of study. The admission process may include an "admission exam" in one or several high-school subjects that correspond best to the training offered by the university; a "competition of files" (concurs de dosare), that is entry based on the grades at Baccalaureate and/or the grades of the relevant subject(s) from high school; essays, interviews and other performance assessments. Some universities may have special places for students that ranked highly in high school olympiads. The process of academic selection is usually more rigorous at state universities than at private universities.

=== International programs ===
The professors have been trying to adapt curricula to that of their counterparts from North America or Western Europe. After 1990, Romania has started many projects supervised by countries from the European Union and also in collaboration with the US, obtaining some projects and bursaries.

The main goal of the country has been to adapt to the European Higher Education System. Especially notable has been the effort for having their academic diplomas recognised by other European countries and for developing international programs such as: Tempus, CEEPUS, Socrates/Erasmus, Copernicus, Monet, and eLearn. With the US, Fulbright programs have been developed.

Tempus is a program for cooperation in Higher Education started between EU member states and partner countries. There are four subprograms (Tempus I, Tempus II, Tempus II-bis and Tempus III between 2000 and 2006). Tempus III is actually a pledge for cooperation in higher education which states to deepen the cooperation on higher education, strengthening the whole fabric of relations existing between the peoples of Europe, bringing out common cultural values. The program allows fruitful exchanges of views to take place and facilitates multinational activities in the scientific, cultural, artistic, economic and social spheres.

More specifically, the Tempus program pursues the establishment of consortia. Consortia implements Joint European Projects with a clear set of objectives, financed partially by this program, for the maximum duration of three years. The development is considered in small steps, successful small projects. Tempus also provides Individual Mobility Grants (IMGs) to faculties to help them improve their activities. In addition, non-governmental organisations, business companies, industries and public authorities can receive financial help from Tempus. CEEPUS, Central European Exchange Program for University Studies, was founded in 1994 by countries from the EU and EU candidates. The program provides grants for students, graduates and university teachers participating in intensive courses, networking, and excursions.

Project eLearn is being developed by European countries to accelerate and share their strategies in e-learning. Monet is a project which aims to facilitate the introduction of European integration studies in universities. The term "European integration studies" is taken to mean the construction of the European Community and its related institutional, legal, political, economic and social developments. The project targets disciplines in which community developments are an increasingly important part of the subject studied, i.e.,

- Community Law
- European Economic Integration
- European Political Integration
- History of the European Construction Process

The Erasmus Mundus program is a cooperation program intended to support high-quality European master courses. These courses are purposed to engage postgraduate studies at European universities. It targets another characteristic, educational mobility, through projects that try to establish consortia for integrated courses of at least three universities in at least three different European countries which lead to a double, multiple or joint recognised diploma.

=== International validation of studies and degrees ===
==== In the Netherlands ====
The Netherlands has accepted starting with May 1, 2008 the articles II.2, IX.2 and XI.5 of the Lisbon Convention on the Recognition of Qualifications concerning Higher Education in the European Region. Usually, Romanian university diplomas (more precisely, licenses got after four/five years of university study, before the application of the Bologna process), are granted in the Netherlands either the title baccalaureus (bc.) (Note: Similar to the degree Bachelor of..., other than BA, BSc, LLB and BEng.) or ingenieur (ing.), (Note: Ingenieur (ing.) is different from ingenieur (ir.): ing. is a HBO title (similar to the degree BEng), while ir. is a WO title (similar to the degree MSc).) which are specific to Dutch higher professional education (called HBO). But there are instances wherein titles like meester (mr.) and doctorandus (drs.), specific for the Dutch research universities (called WO), have been granted based upon Romanian license diplomas (four/five years as nominal study length). In this respect it is a prejudice that one had to do a Romanian university depth study (Note: Informally called "Master"; informally since it is a pre-Bologna arrangement.) in order to get Dutch titles like drs. and mr. In the post-Bologna Dutch educational system, the title mr. has been replaced by and it is equal in value with the degree LLM, and the title drs. has been replaced by and it is equal in value with the degrees MA or MSc. According to the Dutch law (WHW art. 7.23, paragraph 3), Dienst Uitvoering Onderwijs, a service of the Dutch Department of Education, service which was formerly called Informatie Beheer Groep, gives the permission to bear a recognized Dutch title to holders of foreign diplomas who graduated from recognized (Note: I.e. recognized in their own country.) educational institutions, with the condition that a similar faculty and curriculum exists in the Netherlands and that there are no substantial differences between the two educational paths (referring both to the higher education and to the education which usually precedes it in the country of origin).

==== FEANI ====
The European Federation of National Engineering Associations (FEANI) grants the title European Engineer (Eur. Ing.) through its Romanian member (General Association of the Engineers in Romania, AGIR) to AGIR members who graduated a faculty recognized by FEANI and had at least two years of engineering activity.

=== Social involvement ===
After 1990, universities were the first kind of institution to start the reforms for democratization of education. They achieved autonomy, an impossible goal during the socialist regime. Students had been a very active social category participating in the social protests in the years 1956, 1968, 1987, and 1989. After 1990, they formed a very radical offensive campaign aimed against communist politicians. The University Square movement began when, around the University of Bucharest, these students proclaimed a ‘communist free zone’, installed tents around the area and protested for over 40 days demanding that communist statesmen be dismissed from public functions. Additionally, they demanded the autonomy of mass-media.

However, Romanian students’ movements were a model for other neighboring countries. For instance, Bulgarian students made an alliance with union syndicates and protested through marathon demonstrations and strikes. The difference in that case was that their union syndicates were strong allies of students. Also, their movement was less radical but more powerful and realistic. In this case, they succeeded to dismiss some communist leaders. In Ukraine, the social movements from the end of 2004 against electoral frauds had the same structure.

== General assessment ==
Illiteracy rate by county (2011). Lighter colors indicate a very high literacy, and darker colors indicate a higher rate of illiteracy. The national average is 1.22%.

Literacy in Romania is almost universal, with only 0.83% of the population being illiterate, according to the 2021 census. Illiteracy is higher among the Romani minority (3.73%) and Turkish minority (3.13%). The percentage of illiterate persons has decreased throughout the years; at the 2002 census it was 2.6%, and among the Romani minority and Turkish minority the illiteracy rates were 25.6% and 23.7% respectively.

In 2004, the combined gross enrolment ratio for primary, secondary and tertiary schools was 75% (52nd worldwide)

According to the prestigious QS World University Rankings, in 2012, four Romanian universities were included in the Top 700 universities of the world (601+ band): Alexandru Ioan Cuza University, Babeș-Bolyai University, University of Bucharest and West University of Timișoara.

== The situation of rural education ==
The rural population experiences significant hardship, and many rural children have their right to education severely affected - about 16% of children aged 7–10 and 25% of children aged 11–14 from rural areas do not attend school, according to Save the Children. The situation becomes even worse after eighth grade (the last grade of middle school corresponding to age 14–15) because children must change schools to go to high school, and many villages do not have high schools, and therefore parents must make arrangements for their children to commute to the nearest locality or for the child to move there. Commuting is difficult, and as a result many children abandon school (despite the fact that education is compulsory until twelfth grade). In one study, a third of rural school children said they planned to drop out of school after eighth grade.

== Religious education ==
The teaching of religion in schools is a controversial issue in Romania, and it is a political topic regularly debated in the public space. Various politicians (notably Remus Cernea) or NGOs have been vocal on this issue. In 2014, the Constitutional Court of Romania ruled that parents (or legal guardians) of students (or students over 18 years) who want to study religion must submit an opt-in application for this class. Before 2014, all students were enrolled automatically, unless their parents opted-out, with pressure to attend being high. There are also debates on whether religion should be taught in a confessional way or in a history of religion way. Another issue is whether children aged 14–17 (who have a limited form of legal capacity under Romanian law) should choose themselves whether to study religion, or whether their parents should make the decision.

== Studying abroad ==
Since the fall of communism, the trend to study abroad has come back. The numbers of youth studying abroad has been constantly increasing, with about 50.000 youth studying at universities in foreign countries. This contributes to emigration and to the brain drain of the country.

== Funding ==
Secondary education is underfunded in Romania. Parents typically contribute about 100 LEI per student per year as "class fund" (Romanian: "fondul clasei") which is used to buy chalk, etc. (Other estimates are 40 to 450 LEI.) These contributions, amounting to about 70 million euros per year for the whole country, are currently illegal.

== See also ==
- Romanian School Olympiads
- List of universities in Romania
- List of secondary schools in Romania
- Bologna process
- Vocational education
- Education in Europe
- Issues in Romanian education
