= Romanian School Olympiads =

Romanian education competitions

Romanian school olympiads are a series of academic competitions organized for students in Romania, ranging from primary education to upper secondary education, and coordinated by the Ministry of Education, while certain disciplines are organized in partnership with universities or other academic institutions.

They are usually organized in several stages: school level, local (municipal/district), county (județ) and national level. Participants who qualify for the national stage attend a final competition hosted annually in a designated city. In several subjects, including mathematics, physics and informatics, the national olympiad also serves as part of the selection process for international academic competitions.

== History ==
School olympiads in Romania developed as part of a system of extracurricular academic competitions coordinated by the Ministry of Education. Over time, the organization of olympiads has been standardized through national regulations, annual calendars and subject-specific methodologies published by the Ministry.

Many national olympiads collaborate with professional societies, universities and academic institutions, which contribute to problem selection and the organization of national stages. For example, the National Mathematics Olympiad is organized in partnership with the Society of Mathematical Sciences (Societatea de Științe Matematice din România)

== Subjects ==
As of 2026, the following are among the national olympiads approved by the Ministry of Education for which the calendar has been announced:

- Mathematics
- Computer science (Informatics)
- Physics
- Biology
- Artificial Intelligence
- Cybersecurity
- Statistics
- Romanian language and literature
- Linguistics
- Foreign languages (including English, German, French)
- History
- Geography
- Arts and music

== Preparation and training ==
Preparation for national and international competitions may be undertaken individually by participants, using subject-specific textbooks and problem collections, or with the guidance of school teachers and university staff. Specialized training centres, known as “Centres of Excellence” (Centre de excelență), operate in each county and in Bucharest to support high-performing students.

Universities and academic departments frequently collaborate in the preparation process by providing training sessions, mentorship and logistical support for national stages and selection camps. University press releases and reports by team coordinators document institutional involvement in preparatory activities.

== Benefits ==
Medals, diplomas and honourable mentions are awarded at the county and national stage. Subject-specific regulations set the categories of distinction (premiul I, premiul II, premiul III, mențiune) and the related diplomas and certificates.

Many Romanian universities recognise national and international olympiad distinctions in their admissions procedures or offer scholarships and other material benefits to high-performing students. Exact provisions very by institution and year.

Admission rules and the benefits granted to olympiad medallists have changed in recent years. Some Ministry and university clarifications (and press coverage) document modifications to automatic-admission provisions and to which distinctions are eligible for admission without an entrance exam.

Additionally, students who participated in Olympiads describe the experience as confirming their talent and improving their self-confidence.

== Criticism ==
Although Romania has a long record of success at international competitions - including numerous medals at the International Mathematical Olympiad and the International Olympiad in Informatics - nationally representative assessments show weaker average performance. Romania ranked near the lower end of EU countries in the Programme for International Student Assessment in 2022, and a large share of 15-year-olds scored below the proficiency threshold in mathematics. The contrast between elite competition success and comparatively weak average outcomes has been noted in public debate. Education commentators have suggested that the olympiad system benefits a small group of high-achieving students, while broader systemic challenges affect overall performance levels. Educators and psychologists have argued that by including this kind of intensive learning at very young ages may create unnecessary pressure and negatively affect self-esteem.

== See also ==
- Education in Romania
- International Mathematical Olympiad
- International Olympiad in Informatics
- International Physics Olympiad
