= Literacy in Romania =

Literacy rate in interwar Romania (1930)

Before World War II, the literacy rate in Romania ranked among the lowest in Europe. In 1930, at the time of the first official census, more than 38 percent of the population over seven years of age were considered illiterate: 50 percent of the women and over 25 percent of the men in the entire population of about 18 million were unable to read or write. In rural areas, where most of the population lived, illiteracy rate was considered even higher. Prominent reasons for the lack of literacy were that children of school age either were not enrolled in school or, if they were, did not attend classes regularly. There was also a fairly large percentage of children who left school without completing their studies or, having completed only the compulsory first four grades, relapsed into illiteracy in adult life.

Although the proportion of literacy had increased somewhat by the time the Communists came to power, it was still low. The emphasis given to expanded educational opportunities by the party and government between 1948 and 1956 brought a significant decline in the number of illiterates (see Romanian literacy campaign). Classes were organized throughout the country by the various people's councils, and a determined campaign was undertaken to increase enrollment. Most of these courses lasted two years and were conducted on a weekly basis by both regular teachers and literate volunteers; successful completion was officially considered equivalent to graduation from a four-year elementary school.

As a result of these efforts, the 1956 census showed an overall increase in the literacy rate to about 90 percent. According to this census, illiteracy was still concentrated in the rural areas and among women. Literacy courses were continued until late 1958. In the 1970s Western demographers still considered that, although illiteracy had been significantly reduced, it probably still existed among older segments of the population, particularly in remote areas of the country.

According to the 2002 Romanian Census 508,994 people where registered as illiterate, which is 2.6% of the Romanian population aged 10 or more. The majority of the illiterate people were women: 357,245 women were illiterate (3.6% of all women) compared to 151,749 illiterate men (1.6% of all men). Giurgiu, Teleorman and Călărași were the counties with the highest share of illiterate people, at 7.7%, 7.1% and 6% respectively. Among ethnic groups, Romani people and Turks of Romania had the lowest levels of literacy, with illiterates forming 25.6% respectively 23.7% of the total population in 2002, while Jewish people had the highest literacy rate at 99.86%. Ethnic Romanians had a literacy rate of 97.9%, while 98.6% of the Hungarians in Romania were literate.

Literacy Rate in Romania
Year	Total population (aged 10+)	Total illiterate	% illiterate	Illiterate males	%	Illiterate females	%
2002	19,434,788	508,994	2.62	151,749	1.61	357,245	3.57
2011	18,022,221	245,387	1.36	83,456	0.96	161,931	1.74
2021	16,197,679	134,873	0.83	75,110	0.97	59,763	0.71

According to the 2021 Romanian census, the number of illiterates fell to 135,000 people, with men forming the majority of the illiterates for the first time in Romanian history. Illiteracy was highest among Romani and Turkish people, with 3.73% and 3.13% respectively.
