= Issues in Romanian education =

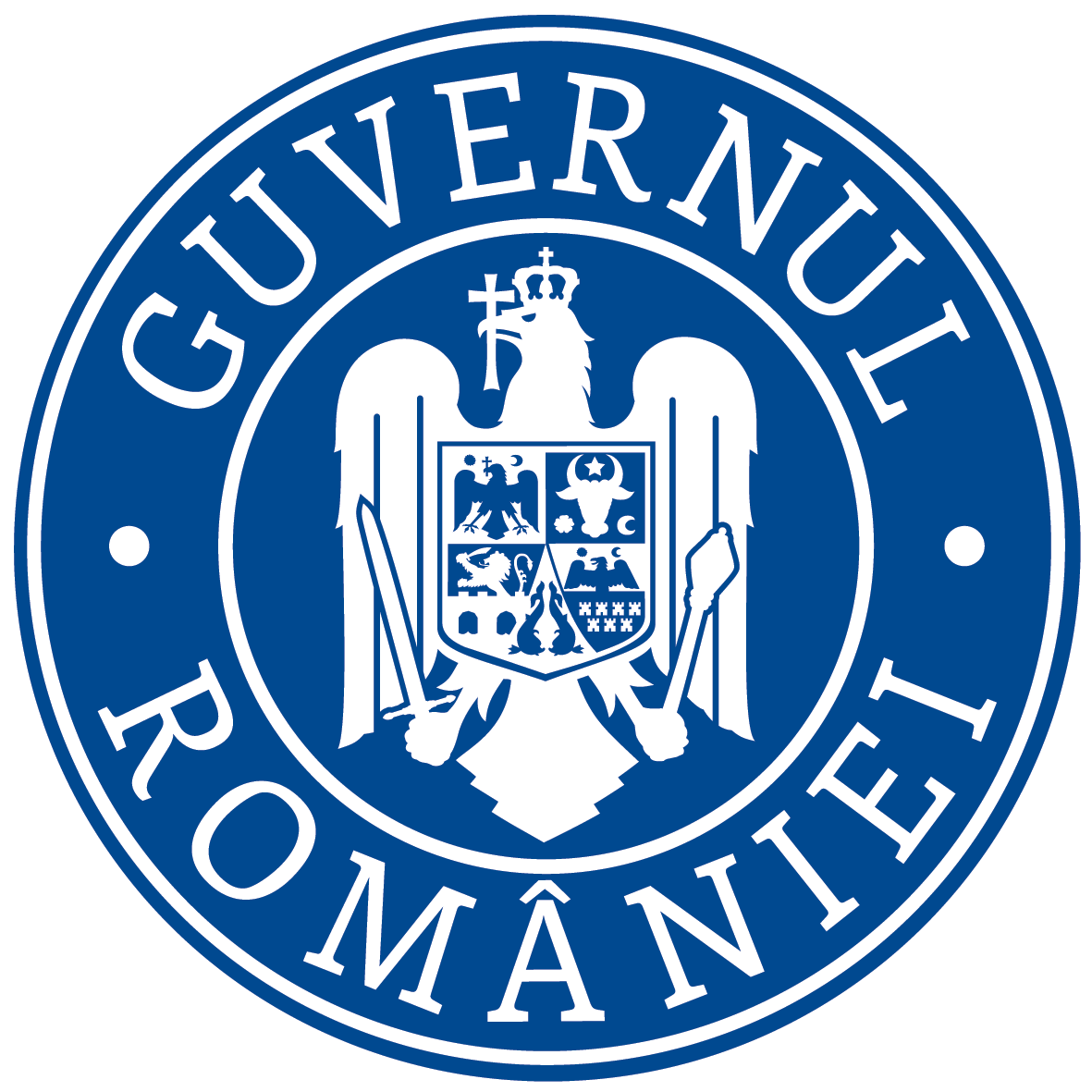
- Functional illiteracy: Up to 89% (lower secondary)
- Below Level 2 (PISA): 49% Mathematics / 42% Reading
- Lacking digital skills (ICILS): 74% (last place in the EU)
- Early childhood education (>4 years): 82.4% (last place in the EU)
- Systemic causes: Urban-rural disparities, rote learning, shortage of STEM staff
- Negative perception: 54% (Ipsos 2025)

Issues in Romanian education refers to the structural deficiencies, inequalities, and operational difficulties identified within the pre-university and higher education systems, as well as their societal effects. Among the main issues highlighted in national and international evaluations are low levels of basic skills, socioeconomic and territorial disparities, insufficient participation in early childhood education, school dropout and absenteeism, a shortage of qualified teaching staff, uneven infrastructure, bureaucracy, instability of reforms, and the reliance of some families on private educational services.

== Historical perspective and continuities ==
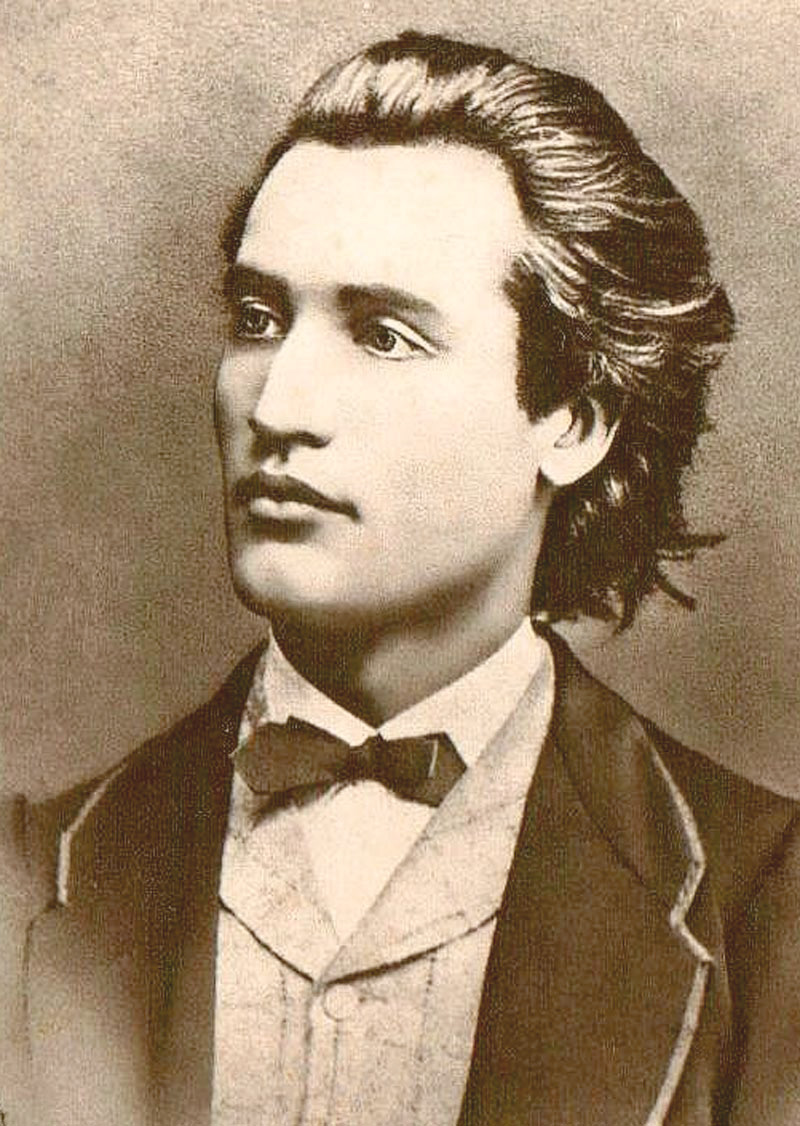
Mihai Eminescu criticized the educational system based on rote learning and overcrowded curricula as early as 1878.

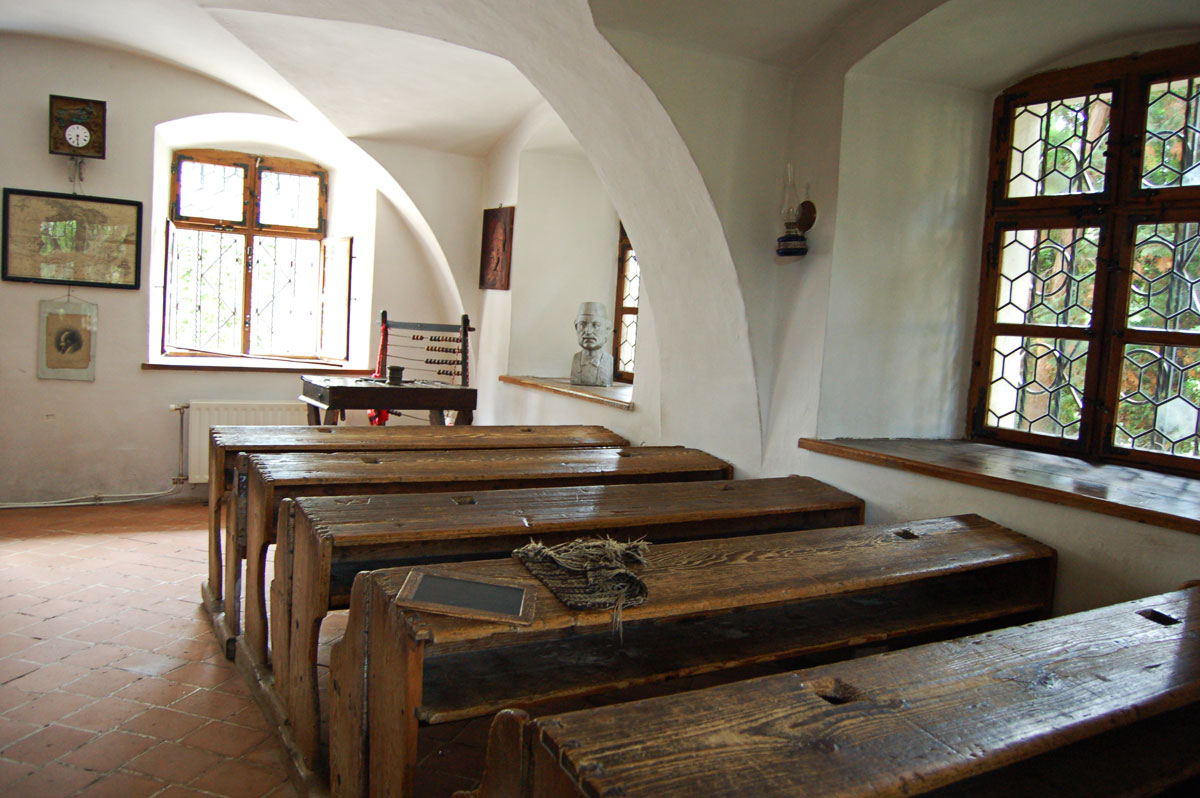
Historical classroom preserved as a historic monument, representative of earlier Romanian school education.

Criticism of rote learning, overloaded curricula, and the gap between theory and practice has a long tradition in Romanian culture, having been articulated since the 19th century by figures such as Mihai Eminescu or Titu Maiorescu (through the theory of "forms without substance").

During the communist era, the educational system was subjected to severe centralization, being used as an instrument of ideological uniformity and control through a single textbook policy and standardized curricula. Although processes of democratization and alignment with European standards took place after 1989, centralist reflexes, bureaucratization, and the gap between legislative reforms and their classroom implementation have continued to persist.

== Systemic underfunding ==
The educational system in Romania faces chronic underfunding, with budget allocations historically falling below the legal threshold of 6% of GDP established in the past, reaching a low of 1% of GDP during certain periods. For example, in 2026, the initial proposed budget for the Ministry of Education and Research was 2.8% of GDP (approximately 57.3 billion lei / €10.94 billion), keeping Romania among the lowest-ranking countries in the European Union regarding education expenditure.

Although Pre-University Education Law No. 198/2023 replaced the target of 6% of GDP with a minimum threshold of 15% of General Consolidated Budget expenditures, the implementation of this measure was repeatedly postponed through emergency ordinances (such as GEO No. 156/2024), drawing criticism from civil society representatives for its lack of predictability. By comparison, average public expenditure on education in the European Union stands at approximately 4.6%–5.0% of GDP (according to Eurostat data), with countries such as Sweden or Denmark exceeding 6%.

== Educational performance, skills, and assessment ==
Literacy rate in 2011 Lighter colors indicate a high level of literacy, while darker colors reflect a higher rate of illiteracy

According to 2021 data (relative to a population of approximately 19 million residents), the overall classical literacy rate in Romania is 99.2% (99.0% for men and 99.3% for women). However, estimated functional literacy is only 56.69% (57.42% for men and 55.91% for women), and the level of basic digital skills is estimated at 31.80% (32.21% for men and 31.36% for women), placing Romania among the lowest positions in the European Union.

Specialized studies indicate that up to 89% of lower secondary school students fall into the non-functional or minimally functional range of literacy skills, while one in three students suffers from innumeracy.

Indicators on literacy, functional literacy, and digital skills (2021, rel. to 19 million pop.)
Category	Classical literacy	Estimated functional literacy	Estimated digital skills
Total	99.2%	56.69%	31.80%
Men	99.0%	57.42%	32.21%
Women	99.3%	55.91%	31.36%

PISA 2022 results reconfirm these deficiencies: 49% of students scored below Level 2 in mathematics, 42% in reading, and 44% in science, while the proportion of those reaching higher levels (5 or 6) is extremely low (1%–4%). In addition, the TIMSS 2023 evaluation places Romanian 8th-grade students below the international average in science (466 points), recording a decline compared to previous editions.

Key PISA 2022 indicators for Romania
Indicator	Value
Students below Level 2 in mathematics	49%
Students below Level 2 in reading	42%
Students below Level 2 in science	44%
Students reaching at least Level 2 in mathematics	51%
Students reaching at least Level 2 in reading	58%
Students reaching at least Level 2 in science	56%
Students at Levels 5/6 in mathematics	4%
Students at Level 5 or higher in reading	2%
Students at Levels 5/6 in science	1%
Socioeconomic gap in mathematics	132 points
Variation in mathematics performance explained by socioeconomic status	26%

=== Assessment, reading, and educational resources ===
The evaluation system is criticized for its emphasis on grades and high-stakes exam pressure (National Evaluation, Baccalaureate), which has led to a decline in reading for pleasure (20% of teenagers do not read any books outside required school texts) and the growth of a parallel system of private tutoring, where families spend considerable amounts (up to 10,000 lei (1900 euros)/year per student). Although new National Evaluation Standards across 5 performance levels ("Advanced" to "In Difficulty") were approved in August 2026, the transition and equivalence with the traditional grading scale remain subjects of debate.

The decline of reading infrastructure is another compounding factor. While in the late 1990s Romania had approximately 16,000 libraries, their number has dropped to nearly 8,300, with the decrease accelerating in rural areas where the number of communal libraries fell from 1,747 in 2020 to 1,484 in 2024. Despite expanded access to digital formats, active reader numbers dropped by around 10% over the last decade, and the Cultural Consumption Barometer indicates that nearly half of the population did not read a single book in a year.

Although the National Defense Strategy officially lists functional illiteracy and lack of education among risks to national security, public policies have often been contradictory. Fiscal measures increased the VAT on books, and the public library network has continuously shrunk due to a lack of funding and disinterest from local authorities. Furthermore, the teaching of European values suffers from underfunding and poor training of teachers; according to a study by the European Institute of Romania, young people tend to associate EU membership strictly with pragmatic benefits, such as freedom of movement, without a deep understanding of democratic values.

Another phenomenon discussed in the public space is that of exam fraud, fueled by the widespread marketing of clandestine electronic devices, such as headphones and micro-cameras for copying. According to a journalistic investigation, traders justify their activity by the inequities and requirements considered excessive by the education system, while educational institutions and authorities encounter difficulties in combating the phenomenon due to legal restrictions on the use of radio jamming equipment.

In the foreign language proficiency test of the 2026 Baccalaureate exam, approximately 95,000 high school graduates took the oral, written and listening comprehension tests, with the majority (90%) opting for English. Although candidates performed very well in the listening test, the examiners reported major difficulties in writing and in maintaining a free dialogue, noting pauses, verbal tics and a reduced ability to formulate complex ideas, attributed to a lack of reading and coherent expression.

=== National examinations and high school admission ===
The results of the 2026 national Baccalaureate examination highlighted significant performance gaps between current-year graduates and candidates from previous cohorts. In the primary (summer) session, the final pass rate reached 76.9% following appeals, with 97,020 candidates passing out of 126,173 present; the pass rate stood at 81.6% for current-year graduates compared to 35.1% for previous cohorts. In the secondary (autumn) session, the initial pass rate stood at 33.8%, with 9,623 passing out of 28,481 present; current-year graduates achieved a 34.9% pass rate compared to 31.6% for previous cohorts.

Beginning with the 2027 intake, Pre-university Education Law No. 198/2023 allows high schools to organize independent entrance examinations for up to 50% of available seats, following the mandatory National Evaluation (Evaluarea Națională). Participation in the separate contest remains optional, and any unallocated seats continue to be assigned through the centralized computerized allocation process based on National Evaluation scores.

The publication of the draft methodology for public consultation in August 2026 sparked debates among civil society and education experts. Alongside concerns regarding increased psychological strain on 14-year-old students and the expansion of the private tutoring market (meditații), investigative journalists and educational analysts highlighted significant integrity vulnerabilities within the proposed examination architecture. The draft prepared by the Ministry of Education drew criticism for omitting standard anti-fraud safeguards—such as mandatory audio-video surveillance in examination rooms, paper anonymization prior to grading, or explicit prohibitions against faculty serving on examination boards if they are relatives or former homeroom teachers of candidates—thereby leaving test administration, grading, grade weighting, and appeals processing entirely under internal high school management.

== Institutional and societal implications ==
=== Educational governance and policy continuity ===
Frequent changes in the leadership of the Ministry of Education since 1989 have raised concerns about continuity in educational policy. In May 2025, Nicușor Dan rated Romania's education system between five and six out of ten, criticizing overloaded curricula and disparities between urban and rural schools.

=== Civic, historical, and media literacy ===
Concerns about media literacy and critical thinking have featured in discussions of Romania's vulnerability to online disinformation. Commentators have linked deficiencies in functional literacy to difficulties in evaluating political information and misleading content on social media.

A 2025 Eurobarometer survey reported that 32% of Romanian respondents considered the overall impact of science and technology on society to be negative, compared with 65% who considered it positive. The findings prompted discussion about public attitudes towards science and the role of scientific education. The place of philosophy in secondary education has also been debated in connection with the development of reasoning and critical thinking skills.

Historical education and public understanding of Romania's communist past have also attracted attention. A 2025 analysis by the Institute for the Investigation of Communist Crimes and the Memory of the Romanian Exile (IICCMER) identified approximately 200 TikTok videos promoting nostalgic portrayals of Nicolae Ceaușescu, which collectively received more than 130 million views over one year.

== Curriculum, teaching methods, and reforms ==
The Romanian education system has been criticized for decades for its curricular overload, reliance on rote memorization, and frontal instruction at the expense of critical thinking and practical applicability. Modernization efforts in recent years include the rollout of smart labs funded by the PNRR, the mandate that 25% of lower and upper secondary school hours be devoted to remedial activities (starting in 2025–2026), as well as the introduction of new subjects such as "History of the Jews. The Holocaust" (2024) and "History of Communism" (2025).

A structural overhaul of the high school curriculum over the past two decades was configured under Pre-university Education Law No. 198/2023, coming into force from the 2026–2027 school year (starting with 9th grade) through the approval of over 400 new syllabi (OMED 3.716/2026). The reform provided extended hourly autonomy, 43 pilot high schools with alternative framework plans, and special measures for special education (therapies and extending high school duration to 7 years).

However, the new syllabi sparked controversy. The "Gândește Critic Edu" Association and university professors such as Liviu Papadima pointed out that the Romanian language curriculum maintains a rigid chronological structure and archaic texts, generating "inert competencies" and ignoring digital literacy. The final version approved in 2026 attempted a compromise, introducing concept maps and artificial intelligence elements alongside chronological study.

At the same time, textbook policy fluctuated from an attempt in 2017 to reintroduce a single mandatory textbook (abandoned following criticism) to ongoing procurement and centralization issues.

=== Civic, emotional, health, and practical skills education ===
Expert analyses indicate that uneven implementation of programs focused on civic development, critical thinking, emotional education, and health education directly impacts school climate and social cohesion.

In civic education, while the curriculum includes subjects such as Civic Education or Education for Democratic Citizenship, teaching methods often remain overly theoretical and reliant on memorization. The deficit in critical thinking is also identified in the National Defense Strategy as a vulnerability linked to functional illiteracy, disinformation, and populism.

On an emotional and relational level, the insufficient development of communication skills is associated with low participation levels and the phenomenon of bullying in schools. Field studies indicate a higher exposure to harassment among LGBTQIA+ students, rooted in homophobic or transphobic attitudes and a lack of teacher training in managing diversity. Currently, the pre-university system does not include a subject dedicated to this topic, with approaches to sexual orientation remaining limited.

At the same time, investigative media reports and non-governmental organization statements have highlighted cases of psychological and verbal abuse exerted by teaching staff against students—a phenomenon that remains underreported due to a lack of trust in internal reporting mechanisms.

In the sphere of sexuality education and reproductive health, Romania records between 15,000 and 17,000 teenage births annually, accounting for approximately 45% of births among mothers under 15 in the European Union. The legal framework adopted in 2022 provides for health education programs starting in the 8th grade, but participation is conditional upon written parental consent, which is why organizations such as the National Students' Council have called for the subject to be made mandatory.

Regarding preparation for the labor market, reports by the European Commission highlight the absence of a coherent national strategy for entrepreneurship education and a weak connection between educational institutions and the business environment.

Regarding environmental responsibility, with the adoption by the Government of the National Strategy on Environmental Education and Climate Change 2023–2030, the pre-university system has begun integrating the notions of environmental protection and sustainable development into the curriculum. The measure targets all levels of education through optional subjects and subjects from the common core and promotes applied learning and the development of the network of "green schools". In practice, however, practices such as burning waste in households and dumping waste in unauthorized locations persist, particularly in some rural areas. Problems concerning responsible resource use are also reflected in government calls for voluntary reductions in electricity consumption, which had a limited effect during peak periods.

=== Status of Religious Education and the Baccalaureate proposal ===
Another contentious subject in educational policy debates is the status of Religious Education and the confessional nature of its instruction. In March 2023, a joint request submitted to the Ministry of Education by 13 recognized religious denominations—demanding the inclusion of Religious Education as an elective subject in the Bacalaureat exam—reignited public controversy.

Critics of this initiative, along with analysts from academia and civil society, argue that religious education in Romania is predominantly conducted under a confessional model (oriented toward indoctrination or proselytization) rather than offering objective education regarding the history of cultures and religions. Furthermore, pressure exerted on students and parents has been reported, alongside logistical difficulties (such as scheduling the class in the middle of the timetable), which emerged following the 2014 Constitutional Court ruling establishing that attendance is based strictly on written request. In response, representatives of the religious denominations argue that the subject is part of the core curriculum and that its inclusion in the school-leaving examination is justified for students who opt for this study, reflecting the cultural and ethical dimension of religion.

=== Digitalization, online safety, and artificial intelligence ===
According to the ICILS international study, 74% of 14-year-old Romanian students lack basic digital skills, ranking Romania last in the EU. Nonetheless, Romanian youth rank first in the EU in using artificial intelligence applications (over 65%), although only a small fraction effectively use them for structured study or research. This gap represents a direct challenge, especially in view of the PISA 2029 assessments, which will officially include AI competency evaluations.

The dropping age at which children receive their first mobile phone (average of 9 years) and the long hours spent online (4–6 hours daily) have heightened the risks of cyberbullying, image abuse, and disinformation, given that media literacy is missing as a widespread subject in the national curriculum.

Regarding digitalization and assessment methods, despite an emphasis on future skills, practical subjects like computer science are often taught and examined in an archaic fashion. In some cases, students are required to write C++ code or complex algorithms by pen on paper, including at the Baccalaureate exam. In the 2018 PISA tests, Romania was the only European Union member state to administer the assessment in printed format, on paper.

Romania faces a chronic lack of cybersecurity education in schools, as it does not exist as a standalone subject in the curriculum despite Romania possessing a strong domestic industry in this domain (Bitdefender). This shortfall exposes students, teachers, and institutions to digital attacks, online fraud, and data theft due to the absence of well-established mandatory school programs or ongoing teacher training. Furthermore, hybrid threats targeting Romania have included cyberattacks against government infrastructure and citizens. For instance, the cyberattack on the Cadastre agency platform on July 14, 2026 shut down the system for over a month, beginning a phased resumption of operations on August 11, 2026, though it remained inaccessible to citizens as of August 16, 2026.

== Inequalities, access, and risk factors ==
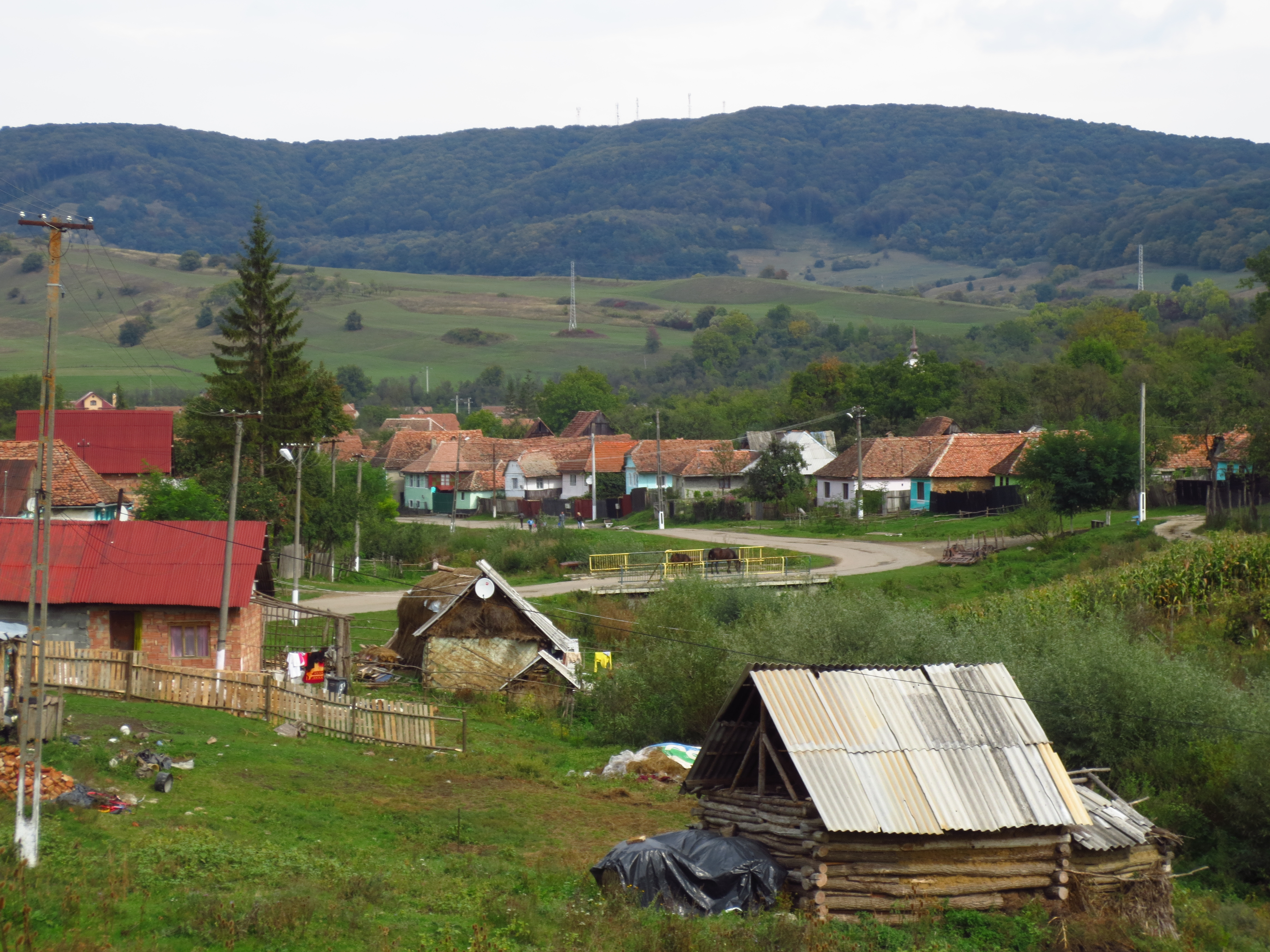
Rural environment in Bunești, Brașov County, Romania.

Urban–rural disparities represent a deep structural issue. Access to infrastructure, qualified teaching staff, and support services is severely limited in rural areas. Likewise, socioeconomic status directly influences performance. PISA data shows a massive 132-point gap in mathematics between advantaged and disadvantaged students.

Participation in early childhood education (preschool) recorded a rate of just 82.4% in 2021–2022 for children over 4 years old, the lowest in the European Union.

Another critical factor is truancy and school dropout. According to OECD reports from 2026, Romania exhibits the strongest association in Europe between long-term absenteeism and low competency levels: over 75% of low-performing students on the PISA tests were absent for more than three consecutive months. The main causes are poverty, lack of transportation, lack of food, or disinterest in the curriculum (with 40% reporting boredom).

Access to education for certain categories of students was hampered by the enactment of Law No. 141/2025 (publicly known as the "Bolojan Law"), a normative act that drastically restricted the eligibility criteria for free public transit for commuters. While previous regulations—based on Pre-university Education Law No. 198/2023 and Government Decision No. 810/2023—guaranteed total free access via direct reimbursement to operators for all commuting students, the new legislative framework limits this automatic benefit exclusively to upper secondary (high school) level. Starting with the 2025–2026 school year, primary and lower secondary students lost their implicit right to free county and intercity transport, which is now granted only in exceptional cases (such as when schooling cannot be provided in their municipality of residence, or if enrolled in special or vocational education).

The flat-rate lump-sum mechanism per kilometer (originally introduced by Emergency Ordinance No. 159/2022 and carried over into subsequent legislation) is no longer the general payment rule, but has been retained by the Ministry of Education only as a subsidiary and exceptional measure, applicable strictly in isolated localities lacking licensed public transit or organized school transport routes. The mechanism is disputed because it does not guarantee actual free transportation. The fixed amount granted by the state is often insufficient to cover real ticket or pass costs charged by private transport operators or actual fuel expenditures. Furthermore, delays exist in disbursing these funds depending on budget availability and methodology. This situation forces families to cover the remaining financial gaps out of pocket.

=== Rigidity and inconsistency in managing absenteeism ===
The normative framework governing Romanian pre-university education—updated through the Student Statute and the Framework Regulation on the Organization and Functioning of Pre-University Education Units (ROFUIP) in 2024—reflects a bureaucratic and non-uniform system for managing discipline and school attendance. Although regulations prescribe issuing a conduct grade at the end of each learning module, with merit scholarships conditioned on maintaining the maximum mark, penalizing absenteeism by lowering the annual average conduct grade is triggered only at the threshold of 20 unexcused absences (or 20% of class hours in a subject), while parents are permitted to excuse up to 40 hours per school year via written requests. Consequently, the structure creates a major discrepancy: on one hand, the system enforces strict administrative and financial sanctions, but on the other hand, it demonstrates high permissiveness, treating student absence as a minor infraction until a massive number of absences accumulates. The Romanian model is thus vulnerable to criticism when compared to high-performing education systems (such as the Nordic model), where attendance is addressed through early pedagogical intervention and individualized support rather than being reduced to a rigid, accounting-style algorithm of retrospective penalty.

The system also faces structural challenges regarding brain drain and systemic underfunding in higher education and research and development (R&D). Proposals to retain medical graduates by requiring them to serve in the national healthcare system after graduation have faced pushback from students and university rectors due to constitutional, ethical, and labor placement concerns, with critics pointing to dangerous shifts (e.g., 24-hour duty shifts), uncompetitive working conditions, and a chronic lack of open positions for specialists in public hospitals. Concurrently, execution of the national R&D budget (PNCDI-IV) consistently falls below statutory targets—dropping below 0.1% of GDP—leading to reduced project competition funding, low success rates for research grants, and concerns regarding the long-term sustainability of scientific infrastructure and human resources.

== Governance, public policies, and reforms ==
=== Centralization, rigidity, and legislative instability ===
Educational management in Romania is characterized by high centralization, bureaucracy, and unequal access to resources. Major administrative and curricular decisions are primarily made at the central level, limiting school autonomy in adapting educational offerings to local community needs. To alleviate this rigidity, the National Pilot Program for alternative framework plans was expanded in 2026 to 43 high schools, granting institutions greater freedom in setting electives and teaching methods.

The system also suffers from a chronic lag between the adoption of reforms and their classroom implementation. The presidential project proposed by Klaus Iohannis, "Educated Romania" (2014–2024), codified through the 2023 education laws, was criticized for the slow pace of measure implementation and the successive delay of high school curriculum reform. In parallel, measures such as the National Program for Reducing School Dropout (PNRAS) and investments under the PNRR have attempted to address funding and infrastructure disparities.

The effects of political variation are heightened by frequent leadership changes at the ministry. A 2018 analysis published by Digi24 showed that, in the three decades following the 1989 Revolution, Romania had seen 20 education ministers, while the two general education laws enacted during this period were repeatedly amended. These successive changes affected exam syllabuses—sometimes just months before exams took place—and faced criticism for a lack of continuity and predictability.

=== Politicization of management and reliance on private tutoring ===
Analyses in scholarly literature point to a growing reliance on private tutoring (meditații) to achieve competitive scores on national examinations. The spread of this phenomenon has been linked to insufficient remedial support provided in schools, discrepancies between the curriculum and exam requirements, and chronic underfunding of the sector. In this context, private tutoring exacerbates educational inequalities, as access to supplementary instruction depends on family income.

Parallel to financial vulnerabilities, the politicization of educational management remains a critical issue. Press reports have documented controversial appointments and successive replacements of school principals and inspectors, often through temporary assignments (detașare), criticizing the influence of political criteria over competence, transparency, and performance. This practice creates managerial instability, complicates the recruitment of qualified personnel, and reduces teachers' professional autonomy.

=== Securitization of the school environment: The "Previsio" project ===
In August 2026, the educational public policy sector was marked by debates concerning the implementation of the "Previsio" project (valued at approximately 1 million euros, funded by EU grants and managed by the SRI in partnership with the Ministry of Internal Affairs and the Ministry of Education). The initiative aimed to train over 1,000 teachers to identify early signs of potential radicalization or violent extremism among students.

An investigative report published by the media outlet Snoop.ro highlighted a lack of transparency surrounding the program, noting that authorities classified inter-institutional consultations and refused to release the list of participating schools. Representatives of civil society and academia raised concerns that teachers could be turned into monitoring agents, potentially damaging trust between students and teaching staff. Critics also targeted the expansion of the initiative through "Previsio 2" (€400,000) and its primary focus on foreign Islamic terrorism over online far-right radicalization, drawing parallels to the UK's Prevent strategy, which faced criticism from the United Nations and Amnesty International.

By contrast, school psychologists and counselors remain underfunded and accessible to only a fraction of students, with a single specialist often responsible for hundreds or thousands of students across multiple facilities.

== Human resources and the teaching profession ==
The education system faces a chronic shortage of qualified teachers, particularly in STEM subjects (mathematics, physics, chemistry, biology), often covered by unqualified substitute teachers or retirees. As a consequence of Law No. 141/2025, the number of unqualified teaching staff reached approximately 6,300 people in the 2025–2026 school year.

The attractiveness of the profession is negatively affected by pay levels. For instance, the Eurydice report for 2024–2025 showed a 6.34% drop in real salaries (adjusted for inflation) for teachers in Romania, representing the largest decrease among 33 European countries. Salary tensions flared up again in August 2026 when the three major education trade union federations (FSLI, "Spiru Haret", and "Alma Mater") rejected the unitary pay scale bill proposed by the Bolojan government. The unions criticized the hierarchy coefficients proposed for implementation starting in September 2028 (2.12–2.55 for pre-university and 2.12–4.05 for higher education), demanding higher pay scales (2.10–2.90 in pre-university and 2.25–4.05 in higher education) to reflect professional training and responsibility. Structural anomalies were also reported in higher education, where some university lecturers ended up being paid less than assistant professors due to the execution of the salary law.

Additionally, the continuous professional development system faced criticism in 2026 due to the commercialization of private courses financed through teacher training vouchers.

== Infrastructure, resources, and lifestyle ==
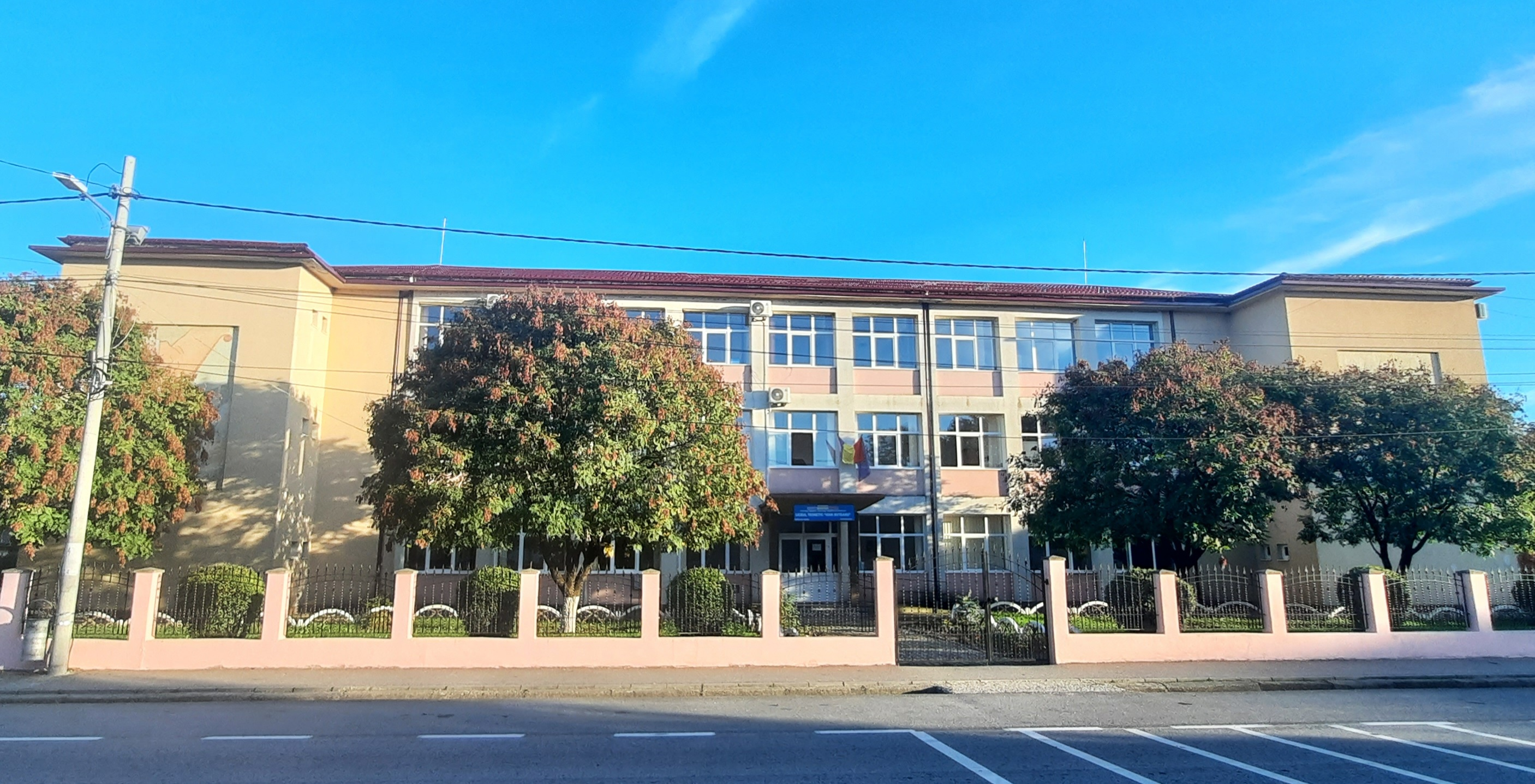
The "Ioan Buteanu" Theoretical High School in Șomcuta Mare, Maramureș County, Romania.

Educational infrastructure remains starkly unequal. In 2025–2026, emergency budget allocations were still required for school units with outdoor/yard latrines, and the reorganization of the school network in 2025 resulted in over 500 small schools losing their legal status.

A related problem is student physical inactivity and rigid grading in physical education classes. Assessment based on rigid physical performance standards discourages less prepared students, leading to an increase in unjustified medical exemptions, which has prompted proposals for Nordic evaluation models based on personal progress.

== Public perception and international comparisons ==
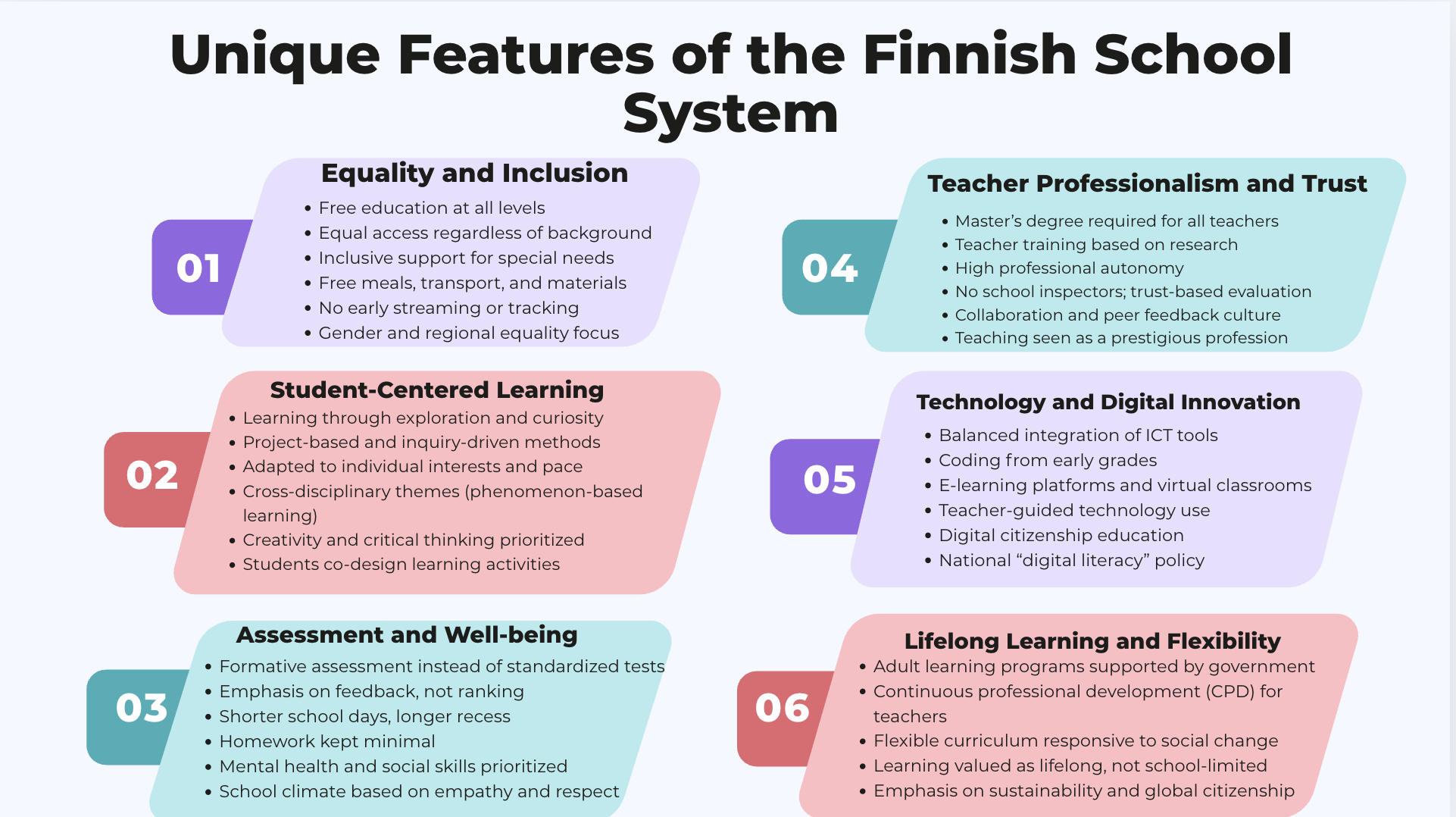
Pillars of the Finnish education system: equality and inclusion, student-centered learning, formative assessment, teacher professionalism, digital innovation, and lifelong learning.

Sociological studies reflect widespread distrust in the system's ability to provide adequate instruction. According to the Ipsos Education Monitor 2025 report, Romania ranked second to last among 29 surveyed countries in public trust in the education system, with 54% of respondents holding a negative perception driven by outdated curricula, poor teacher training quality, school dropout rates, and bullying.

Debates over student workload have prompted reactions from authorities, with a draft by the Ministry of Education proposing to limit homework time to a maximum of one hour per day for primary school and two hours for middle school and high school. The measure, however, is met with skepticism by teachers and parents, who believe that reducing individual activity slows down the pace of learning and affects school performance.

In 2020, vlogger Andrei Șelaru ("Selly"), a graduate of the Frații Buzești National College in Craiova, publicly criticized the high school curriculum and the Baccalaureate exam as outdated and insufficiently practical. In a video that went viral after his graduation, he argued that the education system places excessive emphasis on memorization and test preparation at the expense of practical, financial, and civic skills. His comments sparked a public debate on curriculum relevance and were cited by the Education Minister at the time, Monica Anisie, as a graduate's perspective on the educational system.

In comparative analyses, the Romanian model is frequently contrasted with that of Finland (which emphasizes integrated remedial support, formative assessment, and teacher autonomy) or Estonia (noted for high PISA performance and cohesive digitalization). In contrast, education in Romania remains characterized by heavy reliance on summative exam pressure, widespread private tutoring, and significant socioeconomic divides between schools.

== Solutions and directions for reform ==
The Organisation for Economic Co-operation and Development (OECD) and the European Commission have recommended reforms addressing teacher training, educational inequalities, curriculum, assessment, funding, and governance in Romania. The OECD has emphasized strengthening the teaching profession through improved initial training, mentoring, continuing professional development, and greater pedagogical support within schools. It has also recommended improving school leadership, institutional evaluation, and the use of educational data to guide policy decisions.

Reducing educational disparities between urban and rural areas involves directing additional resources towards disadvantaged schools, expanding access to early childhood education, and providing targeted support for students at risk of school dropout. Recommended measures include remedial education, counselling, school meals, and improved transport accessibility. The OECD has also highlighted the importance of more equitable funding and early intervention to improve educational outcomes.

Curriculum reform recommendations have focused on strengthening foundational skills in literacy, mathematics, and science, reducing curricular overload, and expanding competency-based learning. The European Commission has emphasized the need to align national examinations with curricular objectives and support competence-based teaching. Other priorities include improving formative assessment, developing digital literacy among students and teachers, and strengthening vocational education through work-based learning and cooperation with employers.

In educational governance, the OECD has recommended more effective resource allocation, stronger institutional evaluation, and greater administrative capacity to monitor reforms. Its recommendations also emphasize the importance of coherent implementation, coordination between authorities, and evidence-based policymaking to improve the effectiveness and equity of Romania's education system.

== See also ==
- Education in Romania
- Functional illiteracy
- PISA
- Romanian Baccalaureate
