= Romanian literacy campaign =

Campaign in Communist Romania

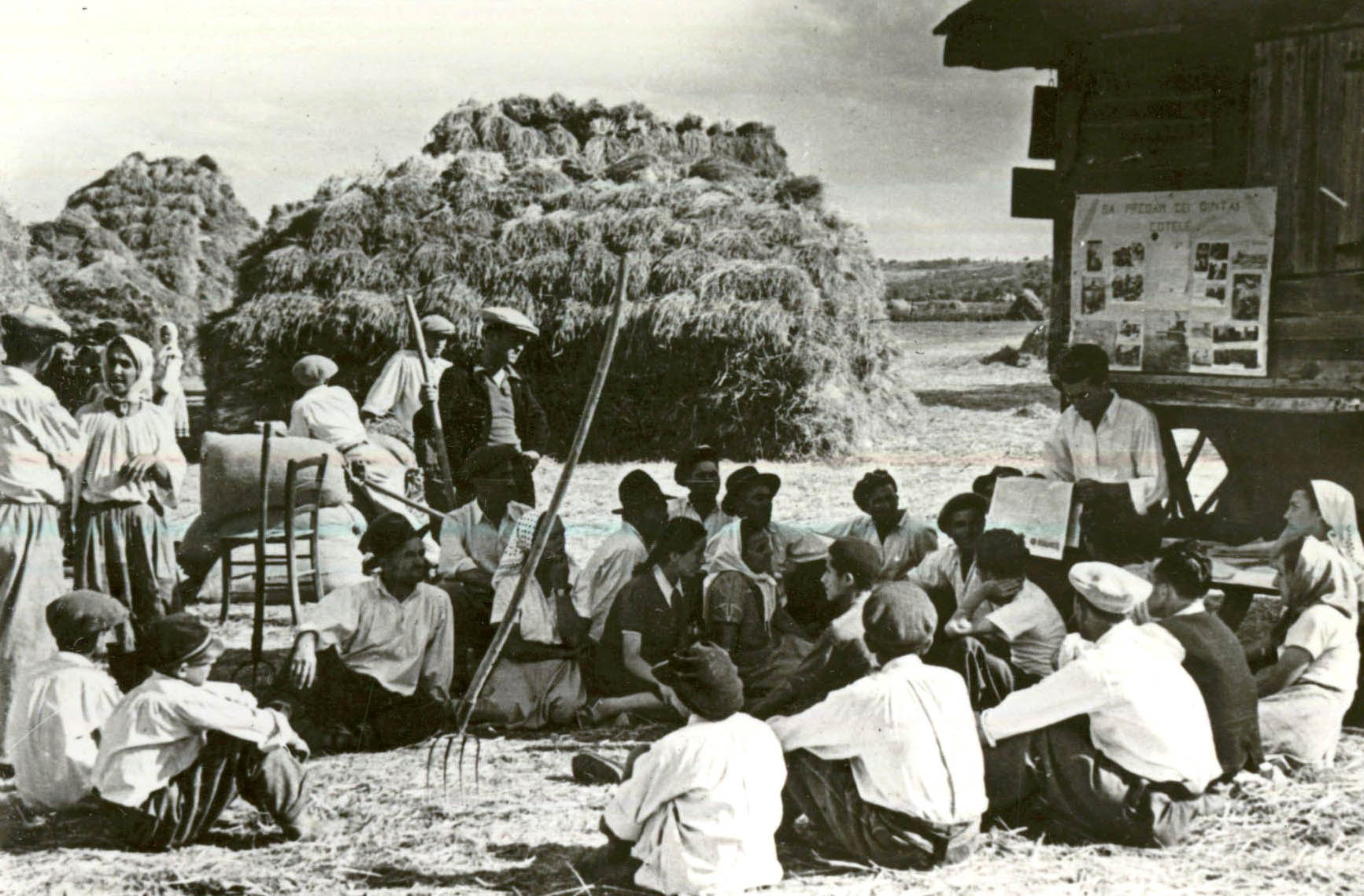
Peasants on a collective farm in Livezeni village, Argeș County being read a newspaper in 1950

The Romanian literacy campaign was initiated by the Romanian Communist Party government through the Education Law of 1948 and nearly eliminated illiteracy in Romania within six years.

Throughout the first half of the 20th century, Romania had one of the largest illiteracy rates in Europe. In the 1930s, 43% of the adult population were illiterate and in October 1945, Romania still had 4.2 million illiterate adults (1.9 million men and 2.3 million women).

The campaign was executed "like a military offensive", and involved the participation of volunteers, including university professors, members of the academia and scientists, who inaugurated schools in the villages. It was aimed both at the children who abandoned or were unable to attend school and at adults of 14 to 55 years of age, who, following one or two years of studies, would receive a diploma equivalent to 4 years of primary school.

== See also ==
- Literacy in Romania
- Likbez
- Cuban Literacy Campaign
- Nicaraguan Literacy Campaign
