= Dimitrie Batova =

Romanian writer, soldier, and political figure (1909–1942)

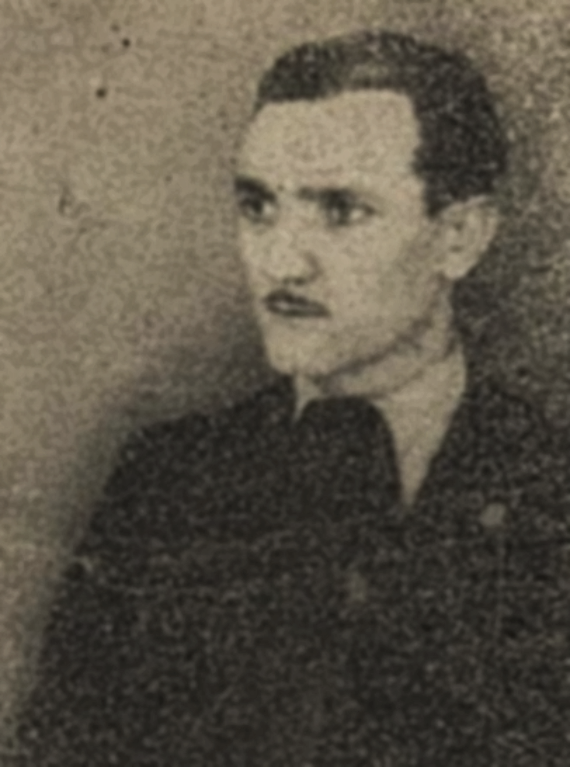
- Batova in 1935
- Born: Dimitrie Popescu; 8 June 1909; Cuzgun, Constanța County, Kingdom of Romania
- Died: 27 November 1942 (aged 33); Călărași, Kingdom of Romania
- Occupations: Schoolteacher; librarian; journalist; editor; songwriter; politician; soldier; footballer
- Writing career
- Period: c. 1932–1942
- Genres: Lyric poetry; philosophical poetry; social poetry; ballade; serenade; romance; social poetry; short story; philosophical novel; satire
- Movements: Neo-romanticism; Parnassianism; Symbolism (Romanian); Avant-garde; Expressionism

Dimitrie Popescu, known under his pen name of Dimitrie Batova (8 June 1909 – 27 November 1942), was a Romanian poet, novelist, and political figure. Linked to the political and lyrical themes of his Dobrujan home, he was the main figure and model of a regional school of avant-garde writers, centered on Silistra. He left that city to study philosophy at the University of Bucharest, but never managed to graduate; on his return, he mainly worked as a librarian and teacher in Silistra, then joined the local press as an editor and polemicist, and was briefly an amateur football player. Batova published fragments of a philosophical novel, and also a single volume of his poems and song lyrics—these became noted for casually moving between the staples of neo-romanticism, with hints of Symbolism, and the extremes of expressionism. He debuted politically as a local leader of the Social Democratic Party, but enthusiastically embraced fascism in the 1930s, and organized the Iron Guard's chapter in Silistra. Such activities resulted in his temporary imprisonment.

In early 1936, Batova rallied with a leftist breakaway of the Guard, the "Crusade of Romanianism". He was subsequently vilified by the Guardist or more generally right-wing press, especially after popularizing his musings about the negative aspects of schoolteachers' unionism; his poetry also came under scrutiny, after new samples appeared in a magazine published by himself and by Aida Vrioni. He had left Dobruja by 1938, being called up as a Sub-Lieutenant in the Romanian Land Forces. He spent much of his final years in Călărași (while Silistra was annexed by Bulgaria and its avant-garde environment was dispersed). His final known commitments ahead of World War II were with the National Renaissance Front (politically) and the Union of Romanian Literati (culturally). Batova was called up under arms on the Eastern Front, and served in the trenches during the Crimean campaign. He died from a service-related disease in Călărași, his scattered work as a poet remaining largely forgotten until the early 2000s.

== Childhood, youth, debut ==
Dimitrie Popescu, later known as "Batova", had lifelong ties to Dobruja region, and especially to Southern Dobruja (the "Quadrilateral")—but actually hailed from the dominant northern portion. He was born on 8 June 1909 in Cuzgun, a village of Constanța County, where he also attended his first years of school. From the age of ten, he moved with his family to Silistra in the southern third of Dobruja (which had been recently incorporated within the Kingdom of Romania), and completed high school there. Literary historian Florin Faifer suggests that he was an eminent student, who earned high praise upon his Romanian baccalaureate examination; young Popescu left for Bucharest to enlist at the main university's department of philosophy, but could not complete his studies "due to precarious material conditions." He returned to Silistra as a librarian at his alma mater (1926–1932; from 1929, he was substitute teacher of religion, physics, chemistry, and art).

In 1927, Batova and his colleagues were putting out a hectographed publication called Revista Noastră ("Our Magazine"). The young man entered politics as a left-winger: in 1932, he was editor at Cuvântul Muncitoresc ("Workers' Word"); around the same time, he was elected regional leader of the Social Democrats. According to Faifer, Batova's articles and short stories of that period show him to be intensely intellectualizing, rebellious, and sarcastic, with a penchant for heavy satire—overall, "a burdened and defiant soul". By 1931, he had produced a philosophical novel, Ieronim, fragments of which appeared in Dunărea and Ecoul Silistrei newspapers. The latter publication employed him as its editorial secretary in 1932. Together with Paul Florențiu, Batova also issued a literary journal called Lira Dobrogeană ("Dobrujan Lyre"), in 1932–1933, and, alongside D. Găvan, a political magazine called Talpa Țării ("Backbone of the Country"), in 1933; he was a constant presence in the regional press, including at Rod Nou (where he was also known as "Kamadeva") and Naționalul Nou (which had him as editorial secretary). He was also included on the amateur football team, Sporting Silistra, drawing praise after appearing in a local derby against Vifor Dristor (October 1932).

In 1933, Batova went on tour with a company of actors, and also grouped his poems, both lyrical and social, in a booklet called Aliquid. It became an instant success in Silistra, where it was published. Faifer observes that, by 1934, he was an intellectual leader of the Southern Dobrujan youth, centered on Rod Nou and Festival journals. Batova impressed his peers and disciples with his "movie-star looks" and "high-end readings", being capable of "maneuver[ing] in philosophical language". In a retrospective study, scholars Ovidiu Dunăreanu and Victor Corcheș classify him as a figure straddling the divide between neo-romanticism, (neo-)Parnassianism, and literary modernism–especially expressionism. As a student of modernism, Geo Vasile describes Batova as "a balladesque writer who adapts himself, on the fly, to the ironic and neologistic expressiveness of avant-garde literature". Vasile notes additional influences from George Bacovia, a doyen of the Symbolist movement, who similarly "exhibited his neuroses". Faifer sees the Aliquid romances and serenades as too indebted to Mihai Eminescu, and overall unsuited to Batova's "anxieties"; he is similarly reserved about the more avant-garde pieces, which seek to be read as philosophical poems with an "absconded ritual", but "do not manage to steer clear of clichés". Another critic, Constantin Miu, noted the series for its "desacralization of the sacred", with a poetic language that is read by Miu as foreshadowing a 1960s modernist, Marin Sorescu.

As a companion of Mihai Stelescu, Batova had switched his political allegiance to the far-right Iron Guard, and was very briefly imprisoned for such activities. Stelescu left that movement in November 1934, setting up his own Crusade of Romanianism—which was deeply hostile to the Guard and generally more leftist in discourse. A year later, Batova was still with the Guard, and was helping to organize its electoral interface, the "Everything for the Country Party", in Silistra. The far-right paper Porunca Vremii commended his "feverish activity" for the cause, also referring to him as a "Panait Istrati of the Quadrilateral". During February 1936, he defected to the Crusade, and asked to be sent lapels for prospective new members. In July, he was writing political articles for the Crusade's eponymous weekly, in which he denounced the local teachers' syndicates, accusing them of fostering incompetence. These works were censured by the right-wing journalist Ion Berinde, who claimed that "Demetris" Batova was of Greek origin, and that his embrace of Romanian nationalism was entirely hypocritical.

== Army career and death ==
The Crusade went into a steep decline after that same month: Stelescu, who had decided to publish supposed revelations about the Iron Guard's corruption, was killed off by a Decemviri death squad. In tandem, Batova had become the object of a cult in his native province; later in 1936, when he was wrongly believed to have died, newspapers ran editorials mourning him as a squandered talent. He continued to write for the remainder of the interwar period, and into World War II. Faifer believes that his post-Aliquid poetry is also the most valuable, revealing Batova as an "authentic poet". Such fragments incorporate an expressionist-like despair, alongside a focus on Balkanic elements—which seem to have been inspired by his contacts with Ion Barbu's orientalist school of poets. In 1937, he joined Aida Vrioni in editing Revista Scriitoarelor și Scriitorilor Români, now drawing negative attention from competitors on the far-right, as well as on the left. The lyrics he published there were republished in Porunca Vremii as an example of how not to write; that newspaper also brought up Vrioni's own politics, noting that, while upholding Batova, she had allowed disparaging remarks about Guardist poet Radu Gyr and about the Decemviri. Batova's poetic samples were simultaneously being panned by Oscar Lemnaru in Facla. Addressing their collective title, which was Mângâieri de harfă ("Strokes on a Lyre"), Lemnaru quipped: Batova, n'ai "har-mă" ci "har-fă" ("Batova, you can't inspire, even though you hold a lyre").

In 1938, as a reserve Sub-Lieutenant, Popescu-Batova was called up for service in the Romanian Land Forces—and sent to Călărași, where his unit had been mobilized. On 1 May of that year, he married Lucia Șerbănescu, with a civil ceremony in Bucharest. He was again in Bucharest in October, acting as a member of the disciplinary committee of the Union of Romanian Literati, organized under Grigore Trancu-Iași and Virgil Tempeanu. A fragment of Batova's planned novel, tentatively called Anteu ("Antaeus") appeared in the Călărași bimonthly, Năzuința. In January 1939, alongside a distinct group of former Crusaders, Batova joined the National Renaissance Front, which had been established as a sole legal party by the Romanian King, Carol II. He remained at Călărași during the first years of war; meanwhile, Silistra and Southern Dobruja were incorporated by the Kingdom of Bulgaria, after a treaty signed in September 1940. The circumstances scattered the Romanian avant-garde literati of Southern Dobruja—one member of the group, Liuben Dumitru, opted for Bulgarian citizenship.

In 1941, when Romania joined Nazi Germany in attacking the Soviet Union, Batova entered front-line service, surviving the Crimean campaign, but fell seriously ill shortly afterwards. He was sent for treatment in Călărași, but his health deteriorated further. Some of his manuscripts were lost at Odessa, causing him great distress, and according to Faifer, speeding up his decline. He died in Călărași on 27 November 1942. He was almost forgotten as a poet until the year 2000, when his work was sampled in a Dobrujan anthology put out by Dunăreanu and Corcheș; he was featured there among similarly rediscovered authors, from Al. Gherghel to Boris Deșliu. During the same decade, Faifer was similarly credited by his peers with allowing them to reread Batova in a new light.
