= Constantin Barcaroiu =

Romanian actor, writer and political figure (1895–1974)

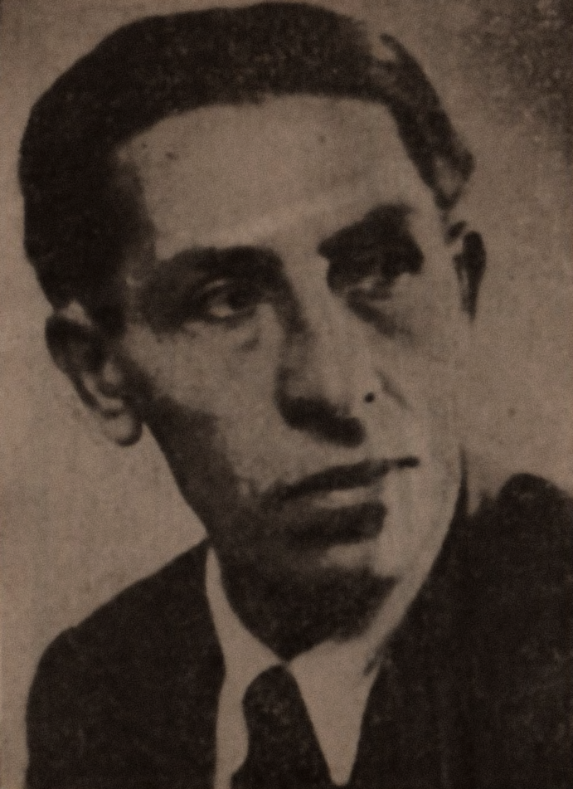
- Barcaroiu in 1935
- Born: 24 January 1895; Bucharest, Kingdom of Romania
- Died: 21 April 1974 (aged 79); Bucharest, Socialist Republic of Romania
- Occupations: Actor; journalist; editor; politician; propagandist
- Writing career
- Period: c. 1922–1959
- Genres: Essay; lyric poetry; prose poetry; social poetry; social novel; reportage
- Movements: Symbolism (Romanian); Proletarian literature; Expressionism; Literary naturalism

Constantin Barcaroiu (24 January 1895 – 21 April 1974) was a Romanian actor, writer and political activist, noted for his involvement with the extremist Crusade of Romanianism. Born to destitute workers, he had his beginnings in the socialist movement, contributing to its artistic propaganda. He graduated from the Bucharest Drama Conservatory, but struggled to find employment, and moved around the country; in tandem, he also penned poems and articles that were featured in various publications—beginning with Epoca—and was a magazine editor. He was a late contributor to the Symbolist movement, into which he added his own social messaging, as well as some standards of expressionism and literary naturalism. He joined the Crusade after it had split from the more conventionally fascist Iron Guard, and, in his work as a Crusader poet and novelist, combined Christian messaging with the staples of proletarian literature. Barcaroiu remains particularly noted for his social novel, Periferie, published at the height of the Great Depression.

Barcaroiu left the Crusade in September 1936, shortly after its leader, Mihai Stelescu, had been assassinated by an Iron Guard death squad. Alongside other former Crusaders, he joined the National Renaissance Front, created in 1939 around Carol II the authoritarian King—whom he viewed as likely to provide social programs against unemployment. In tandem, Barcaroiou networked with the Adonis group of poets, which brought together proletarian writers and some of the former Crusaders. He and the circle remained active during the Guard's "National Legionary State", and also during the pro-Axis dictatorship of Ion Antonescu. Enjoying success as an actor, and seeing his novel reprinted, Barcaroiu was also repeatedly involved in Antonescian propaganda, up until the anti-fascist coup of 1944. Though deciding to end his journalistic activity in 1945, he was still active on the stage during his final three decades, which were spent under communist rule. The communist authorities expressed their satisfaction with his work in that sphere, offering him permanent employment at the state theater in Reșița.

== Actor, socialist, Crusader ==
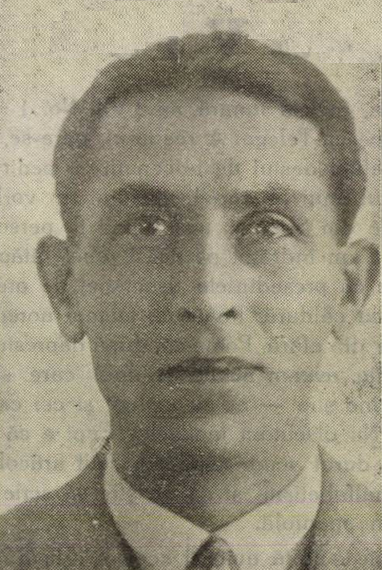
Barcaroiu in 1928

Barcaroiu was born in the outer slums of Bucharest, on 24 January 1895, to industrial workers George Georgescu and Maria Barcaroiu. As literary historian Dan Mănucă observes, the two were "very likely indigent", meaning that Constantin had to struggle to remain in school. In 1915–1916, he was enlisted at Theodor M. Stoenescu's Academy of Music and Drama, which had its yearly graduation shows at Liedertafel Hall. During the first such gala, he impressed the columnist at Dimineața, who noted that he was suited for comedies. After the next such performance in June 1916, he was recommended by Minerva newspaper as an already accomplished young talent. His first known political affiliation was with the Socialist Party of Romania, which, at some point after 1919, recruited him as its actor-propagandist, alongside fellow Stonescu academy alumni Alexandru Finți and Sandu Eliad.

Barcaroiu was absent from records during the later stages of World War I, which came with a period of German occupation. Returning to cultural life in interwar Greater Romania, he had his debut as a poet in 1922, when samples of his work appeared in Epoca daily. According to Mănucă, they display faint echoes from Ion Minulescu, already showing Barcaroiu as a "belated Symbolist". Barcaroiu had also enlisted at the state-run Drama Conservatory, taking his final exams in 1924. On 31 March 1923, the Belle-Arte Association, formed by Barcaroiu's colleagues, held a benefit show for him. In August of that year, he was in Breaza, performing alongside Dinu Macedonski in Max Maurey's Le Stradivarius. Around 1924, Barcaroiu's own poetry was being read out during cultural evenings at a socialist club, located on Bucharest's Șelari Street. In May 1925, he traveled to Bolgrad in southern Bessarabia, as a guest of General Neculce Society. Here, he performed a comedic monologue, and was praised by Îndreptarea's local correspondent for his "unparalleled humor." By September, he was cast as the lead in Erasmus Montanus, done at the Bucharest People's Theater from a classical text by Ludvig Holberg. Critic Scarlat Froda appreciated the production, but described Barcaroiu as "too cavernous" for the part.

For the next decade, Barcaroiu was an itinerant actor. In tandem, he penned social poetry and theater criticism for various outlets, including Răsăritul and Capitala (both of which had him as an editor), Flacăra, Universul, and the Iron Guard's Sfarmă-Piatră. He came into contact with Mihai Stelescu, who had formed the Crusade as a Guardist dissidence. Stelescu gave him his first break was in political journalism: in 1934, Barcaroiu became editor of the Crusade's eponymous magazine. His inaugural article there was an indictment of economic liberalism, which he blamed for the Great Depression. Observing that there was "overproduction" while "the masses are hungry [and] the nation walks about naked and barefooted", he stated that the liberal state was mismanaged, opting for dirigisme. Also that year, he collected his prose poetry as Florile roșii ("The Red Flowers"), seen by Mănucă as a melodrama-tinged commentary on working-class life, with tones of "enraged Christianity" and a heavy reliance on biblical analogies. A contemporary reviewer, C. Dan Pantazescu, described the volume as "a drop of poison mixed with flower", placing side by side "a laudable effort toward artistic beauty" and an ideological lesson about "the turmoil of human beings, grieving in the face of the misery and infamy that lurks in obscure corners."

== Periferie ==
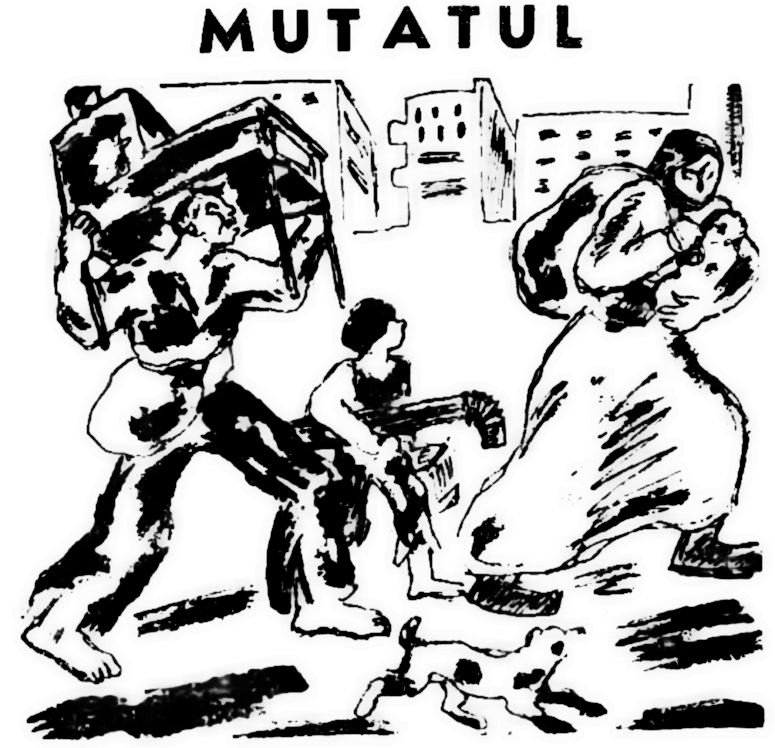
Mutatul ("Moving Around"), scene of the Great Depression in Romania; by the left-wing artist Nicolae Cristea

In 1935, Barcaroiu debuted as a novelist with Periferie ("Periphery"), which he wrote alongside his close friend Petre Bellu, who was completing his own novel (Apărarea are cuvântul). According to Bellu, they went through "days of sad serenity, sharing a loaf of bread, a cigarette, and a dream that we tore away, with great difficulty, from the tragedy of life." Combining proletarian literature and Christian principles, Periferie is seen by Mănucă as "manichean". The critic is unimpressed by its promise of a humanitarian world-to-come; he nonetheless makes note of Barcaroiu's language, which creates a "landscape of poignant color" that announces Eugen Barbu's prose. Scholars such as Henri Zalis, which analyze both Barcaroiu and Barbu as heirs of literary naturalism, also draw a distinction between the two: while Barcaroiu belongs with Carol Ardeleanu in a category of lesser naturalists, fully embracing its stylistic requirements, whereas Barbu (like Tudor Arghezi and Marin Preda) is only partly an adherent, using naturalistic techniques only when convenient.

Speaking for the Crusade, Alexandru Talex praised Periferie as a worthy sample of proletarian "social frescos", alongside works by Ardeleanu and George Mihail Zamfirescu. This verdict was received with scorn by the left-wingers at Facla, who described Periferie as "sinister" and "ungrammatical" propaganda in favor of "Crusader fascism". Rendering in full a fragment in which Barcaroiu detailed a sexual act (with "reduced literary imagination"), Facla suggested that he was perhaps better suited for factory work. Barcariu's stated mentor was Panait Istrati, who had also been an intellectual luminary of the Crusade. Shortly before his death in April 1935, Istrati had reportedly vetted Periferie for publishing, calling it "a social novel of a rare kind." On 19 May, Barcariu helped set up the Friends of Panait Istrati Association, operating out of the deceased author's home. Its managers included Stelescu, Talex, Demostene Botez, Vladimir Cavarnali, Petru Manoliu, and Aida Vrioni.

Periferie, meanwhile, enjoyed some commercial success, though Barcaroiu had to promote it himself. The future literary historian Mircea Zaciu, at the time an adolescent, recalls seeing him doing so at "a small bookshop" in Arad, "the sad symbol of a scorned or neglected artist". Another distributor was his Jewish publisher, Ignaz Herz, who was at the time being singled out as a peddler of pornography. Himself a novelist, Theodor Rășcanu came to Herz's defense, noting that, though inclined toward sensationalism or paraliterature, his distribution network included "many works of fine literature", including those penned by Barcaroiu and Bellu. Pantazescu, who had objected to Periferie (seeing it as a base book that signaled Barcaroiu's loss of importance), observed with satisfaction that there was a dispute between the author and Herz: those on Bercaroiu's side accused Herz of having modified the text to increase sales, with help from a ghostwriter named Ștefan Freamăt.

In June 1935, Barcaroiu signed up to a manifesto of the young writers (also signed by Virgil Carianopol, Paul Daniel, and Dem. Bassarabeanu), who demanded that the King-regnant, Carol II, create a social program for the employment of young intellectuals. Stelescu was eventually assassinated by an Iron Guard death squad in June 1936, leaving his movement in divided into factions. In September, Talex left the Crusade, citing "ideological disagreements" with the new leadership. His example was immediately after followed by thirteen other high-ranking members, including Barcaroiu, Cavarnali, Paul Bărbulescu, and Virgil Treboniu. In October, the Crusade's "leadership committee" published a "letter of clarification". It accused "three or four" members of having been agents provocateurs, who had "sought to discredit the movement by presenting it as supportive of the communist credo."

== Adonis and World War II propaganda ==
Logo used by the Adonis circle in 1940–1941

In 1938, Barcaroiu was present, with a retrospective praise of Istrati, in Gaby Michailescu's weekly Politica Vremii. By then, King Carol had entered a full-blown conflict with the Guard, during which he also suspended democracy, imposing an authoritarian constitution. In January 1939, Barcaroiu and a distinct group of former Crusaders (including, among others, Talex and Treboniu) formally joined the new state party, called National Renaissance Front (FRN). Barcaroiu also returned to poetry, with Cetatea mea ("My Citadel"), published in 1939. Mănucă observes that it combines the standards of Symbolism with an expressionistic hints. By January 1940, he had joined Treboniu's literary club, Adonis, which was operating from a small home in Rahova; other fomer Crusaders were also members, as were Mihail Crama, Mihu Dragomir, and the shoemaker-poet Cristian Sârbu.

The FRN lost power in late 1940, and the Guard took over, inaugurating its "National Legionary State". Barcaroiu remained active during this interlude. Joining Petre V. Haneș and Pavel Macedonski's circle by December of that year, he read out from the Romanian classics Alexandru Macedonski and Vasile Alecsandri. In early January 1941, he was performing at the Municipal Theater, winning acclaim for his background role in Henry Bataille's Résurrection. The Guardist regime was removed just days later, allowing the country to come under a military dictator, Ion Antonescu. Barcaroiu continued to act at the Muncipal company: in March 1941, he was applauded as the lead in Negustorul de iluzii, adapted from Herbert Grevenius' Train 56. His lyrics were taken up by George Acsinteanu and Cuza Marinescu's short-lived review, Pan.

In June 1941, after Antonescu had confirmed an alliance with Nazi Germany, Romania entered the anti-Soviet war. Barcaroiu was sporadically active for the remainder of Antonescu's rule. In September 1941, his Închinare Mareșalului Antonescu ("An Homage to Marshal Antonescu") appeared in Pan M. Vizirescu's magazine, Muncitorul Național Român. Periferie went through a second edition in early 1942. Reviewer N. Decebal, convinced that "it will sell", also depicted it as fundamentally a book about self-improvement. Bellu welcomed the new release, done "in outstanding technical conditions" by a new and "daring" publisher, Constantinidi—contrasting it with "those disgusting figments that are currently flooding the market."

During November 1942, Barcaroiu appeared at the Bucharest Alhambra in Suflete în luptă, by the invalid veteran Fane George Paliște. Early in 1943, he traveled through the Bessarabia Governorate, which had recently been reestablished by Romania from the Moldavian SSR. With a reportage in the local press, he welcomed the reconquest of Chișinău, which he regarded as a naturally Romanian city, and argued that its devastation had been an act of revenge (or "Judaic fury") by the Bessarabian Jews. In April, the Deputy Premier, Mihai Antonescu, took Barcaroiu and other writers on a literary tour of Argeș County, where they paid homage to designated heroes of the war. That year, his verse was collected in an anthology of nationalist poetry, specifially dedictaed to the cause of Northern Transylvania (which, under Nazi commands, had been ceded to Regency Hungary). His contributions addressed the region directly:

De-o trebui din nou să lupt,
Vărsa-voi sânge și mai mult;
Și alte mii de ani, mereu
Voi face scut din pieptul meu.

Translation:

If I'm allowed to fight anew,
I'll spill more of my blood for you;
And with the passage of the centuries
My body will redeem your boundaries.

== Under communism ==
Barcaroiu's new volume poetry, Pe drumuri însorite ("On Sunny Roads"), appeared in February 1944 as part of the Adonis collection. It broke away with Symbolist tropes, but, as Mănucă argues, its verse remains merely "descriptive and hasty." In late July 1944, the author was working for the Propaganda Directorate, touring the countryside at Tâncăbești and Mihăilești with renditions of Victor Ion Popa's comedy, Deșteapta pământului. The anti-fascist coup of 23 August brought Romania into the Allied camp (under a Soviet occupation), and also signaled the political rise of the Romanian Communist Party. In November, Barcaroiu resurfaced as a contributor to the left-wing Opinia Liberă, published out of Ploiești. During May 1945, he was inducted by the revamped Romanian Writers' Society, officially described as one of the "democratic writers" who had been prevented from joining that body in its earlier, more conservative incarnations. He disappeared from journalism later in 1945, focusing instead on his acting career—spent in successive employment at various "atheneums of the people". Shortly after, a Romanian communist regime was inaugurated. Barcaroiu returned to publishing in 1948, with the lengthy poem Mama ("Mother"). Mănucă sees this booklet as attempting to construct "a symbol of suffering and universal resignation", observing that the prosody here becomes "tormented and strange".

From 1949, Barcaroiu was accepted as a full-time member by the state theater in Reșița, which had been founded the previous year. The regime appreciated his work in the field, and in February 1954 he was decorated by Great National Assembly. The following year, he earned praise for his class-conscious Marquis of Forlipopoli, in Carlo Goldoni's Mistress of the Inn. Barcaroiu remained in Reșița until his retirement. In December 1959, he attempted to return as a poet, sending new works to be published in Steagul Roșu. These were rejected by Henri Zalis on behalf of the editorial staff; in his response, Zalis noted that most of the stanzas were "prosaic", advising him to "read more literature, and especially present-day poetry."

Into the 1960s, Periferie was still read with interest by the literary researcher and fiction writer Alexandru George. This was however mostly due to the book's historical setting and polemical nature, which George found to be more interesting than the prevailing tropes of socialist realism. Barcaroiu died in Bucharest on 21 April 1974. Revisiting his 1940s contribution in 1990 (shortly after the Romanian revolution had ended communism), folklorist T. A. Enăchescu referred to him as "a lesser-known poet".
