= Crusade of Romanianism =

Political party in Romania from 1934 to 1937

Crusade of Romanianism Cruciada Românismului
- President: Mihai Stelescu (first); Gheorghe Beleuță (last)
- Founder: Mihai Stelescu
- Founded: November 22, 1934; 91 years ago
- Dissolved: c. June 1937; 89 years ago
- Split from: Iron Guard
- Headquarters: Caradja House, Calea Victoriei 142, Bucharest
- Newspaper: Cruciada Românismului
- Membership: 100+ (attested, 1936); 30,000 (claimed, 1936)
- Ideology: Syncretic politics (Third Position); Revolutionary nationalism (Romanian); Classical fascism (to 1936); Anticapitalism; Anticommunism; Economic antisemitism; Libertarian socialism; Cooperatism
- Political position: Far-right (with left-wing elements)
- Religion: Romanian Orthodoxy
- National affiliation: Constitutional Front (1935)
- Colours: Carmine
- Anthem: Imnul cruciat

The Crusade of Romanianism (Romanian: Cruciada Românismului, also known as Vulturii Albi, "White Eagles", Steliști, "Stelists", or Cruciați, "Crusaders") was an eclectic revolutionary movement in Romania. Founded in late 1934 by Mihai Stelescu, it originated as a dissident faction of the Iron Guard, Romania's main fascist movement, and was virulently critical of Guard leader Corneliu Zelea Codreanu. Stelescu, who had served as one of the Guard's orators and paramilitary organizers, reinterpreted nationalist ideology through the lens of anticapitalism and "humane" antisemitism; also appropriating some ideas from communism and classical (Italian) fascism, his followers were sometimes described as Romania's Strasserists. The Crusade was briefly but centrally associated with Panait Istrati, world-renowned novelist and dissident communist, who, before his death in early 1935, added into the mix of "Romanianism" some elements of libertarian socialism. Stelists offered an alternative paramilitary symbolism to that of Codrenists, which included a cult of personality surrounding Stelescu and Istrati, as well as a uniform of deep-red (carmine) shirts—opposed to the green shirts used by the Guardists, which had also been introduced by Stelescu during his time there. In geopolitical terms, they were either fearful of, or openly hostile toward, Nazism.

The Stelists, who sketched out plans for a nonviolent revolution, oscillated between maverick independence and alliances with more prestigious nationalist parties. In their early search for electoral gains, they gravitated mainly around the People's Party. In late 1935, the group experienced its own schism, after Constantin A. Caradja, its alleged financier, established a breakaway "National Front"; he later returned as a personal adviser to Stelescu. The Crusade itself was a minor party, whose decision of publicly settling scores with the Iron Guard proved fatal. In June 1936, Stelescu was murdered by an Iron Guard death squad, and his party only survived for less than a year. General Nicolae Rădescu took over as its leader, either formally or informally, but his management was resented by party members such as journalist Alexandru Talex and poet Vladimir Cavarnali, both of whom resigned in September 1936. Caradja was briefly the Crusade's chairman, but left in March 1937 to be replaced by Gheorghe Beleuță, who was the movement's last known leader.

Before 1938, Caradja still tried to reestablish the Crusade; such attempts were cut off by King Carol II, who outlawed all political parties and had them replaced with a National Renaissance Front, which, in early 1939, inducted former Crusaders such as Talex, Beleuță, Caradja, and Sergiu Lecca. During World War II, Rădescu and Lecca were right-wing opponents of the military dictatorship established by Ion Antonescu. Taking over as Prime Minister of Romania after the anti-Antonescu coup of August 1944, Rădescu fell out with the Communist Party, which toppled his government and pushed him into exile. The emergent communist regime persecuted known Crusaders, who were still a faction in the underground resistance movement, where they also pursued old conflicts with the Iron Guard. Talex was spared such treatment, and allowed to work for the regime; into the 1980s, he spurred controversy about the Crusade, denying that either Istrati or the Stelists as a whole were fascists.

== History ==
=== Beginnings ===
Originally named "The White Eagles", the Crusade emerged in early 1935, as a splinter group from the Iron Guard. Stelescu's break with Codreanu was sudden and public. In 1932, Stelescu was a prominent Guard politico, tasked with political campaigning in Bucharest and the youngest Romanian Parliament member. As documented by visitors Jean and Jérôme Tharaud, Stelescu eclipsed his political boss in matters of oratory and political competence. As a consequence of this, Codreanu began handing him risky assignments, implicating him in the assassination of Premier Ion G. Duca (for which Stelescu served a term in prison). It is also likely that Stelescu was infuriated by Codreanu's refusal to tackle the political establishment head on: in 1934, the Guard was keeping a low profile, content with mildly criticizing the authoritarian King Carol II. In April of that year, shortly after the indictment of Victor Precup (who had tried to assassinate Carol), Stelescu himself publicly joined the loyalist movement: he led three columns of students which paid their personal homage to the king outside the Royal Palace, Bucharest.

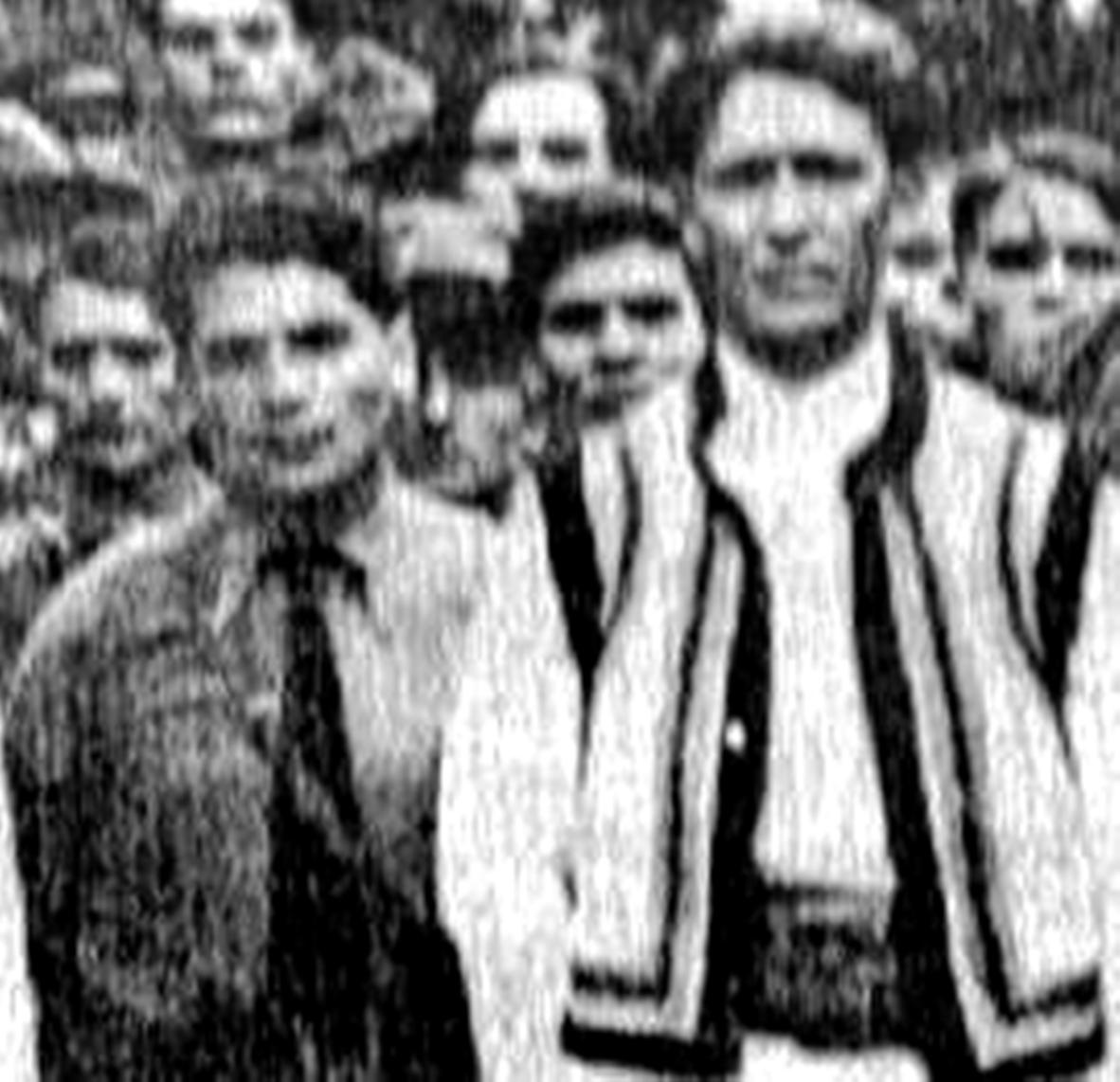
Iron Guard rally, 1933. Codreanu is front row, right, with Stelescu by his side

When, in September 1934, Stelescu went public with his first denunciations of Codrenist tactics, he was promptly excluded from the Guard. The decision had a vague disclaimer: Stelescu could be welcomed back into the Guard on condition that he perform an exceptional act of self-sacrifice. According to later Codrenist mythology, Stelescu had in fact been exposed as the would-be assassin of Codreanu. For his part, Stelescu alleged that, by hinting at reconciliation, Codreanu had discreetly urged him to poison another one of the Iron Guard's adversaries: Foreign Minister Nicolae Titulescu.

Stelescu left together with some other high-ranking activists of Codreanu's movement, who helped him establish the "White Eagles" party, and possibly convinced all of the Guard's youth sections in Bucharest to join them. As he put in 1936: "everything 'real' that exists in the Guard is what I put into it, and will forever be mine. I never joined the Guard as an individual. I entered it together with my entire movement, which still exists." Historian Franklin Lewis Ford sees the schism as important, arguing that Stelescu effectively took control of the "Cross Brotherhood" network, which he had helped recruit for the Guard in the late 1920s. Citing the Guard's supposed elitism (and in particular Codreanu's association with "those blue-blooded ones, people of dubious [ethnic] origin"), Stelescu hoped to rely on support from more populist Guardsmen, including Ion Moța and Gheorghe Clime. Reportedly, the splinter group soon found backing among figures of the Carol regime, who financed it as a way of drawing away support from the Guard.

The Crusade formalized its existence on November 22, 1934, which was celebrated yearly by its followers as the day of "Work, Honesty, and Truth". Literary historian Mircea Iorgulescu notes: "the 'Crusaders' adhered to a protocol that was similar to that of the Guardists—distinctive signs, gatherings performed in an atmosphere of mysticism and clandestinely, a cult of personality surrounding their 'chief', pilgrimages, the annexation and usurpation of symbols, under whose guise they their own attitudes and orientations. [...] The new movement had two main objectives [...]: 1) the unification of the nationalist-and-antisemitic right; 2) Corneliu Zelea Codreanu's elimination." Also on November 22, Stelescu established his eponymous weekly newspaper, Cruciada Românismului, with Alexandru Talex as editor and himself as director. Talex, who was politically independent, had been university colleagues with Stelescu. He was moved by Stelescu's marginalization, but, as he recalled in a later interview, personally disliked him. Talex and Stelescu were allegedly supplied with funds by Prince Constantin A. Caradja, who served as national vice president of the Crusade. His home, on Calea Victoriei 142, was also the Crusade's headquarters.

Other men involved with Stelescu's newspaper and movement were exile painter Alexis Macedonski, alongside journalists Sergiu Lecca, Dem. Bassarabeanu and Mircea Mateescu. Joining them were a cartoonist, Gall, and, occasionally, the aspiring poet Constantin Virgil Gheorghiu. Other poets who affiliated with the Crusade were Vladimir Cavarnali (president of the Crusade sections in southern Bessarabia) and Dumitru Corbea (formerly of the Iron Guard, whom he vehemently denounced, and likely author of articles from his native Dorohoi County). The Crusade lodge in Brăila was headed by Alexandru Ceapraz and had the painter Nicolae Hornetz among its members; engineer Oscar Stoenescu was both the Crusade leader in Galați and the general secretary at a national level. More famously, Cruciada Românismului hosted articles by Panait Istrati. He was a literary celebrity and long-time socialist, whose public denunciation of the Soviet Union had sparked an international controversy. It is still unclear whether Istrati was ever formally affiliated with the Crusade as a political party—though some authors suggest as much.

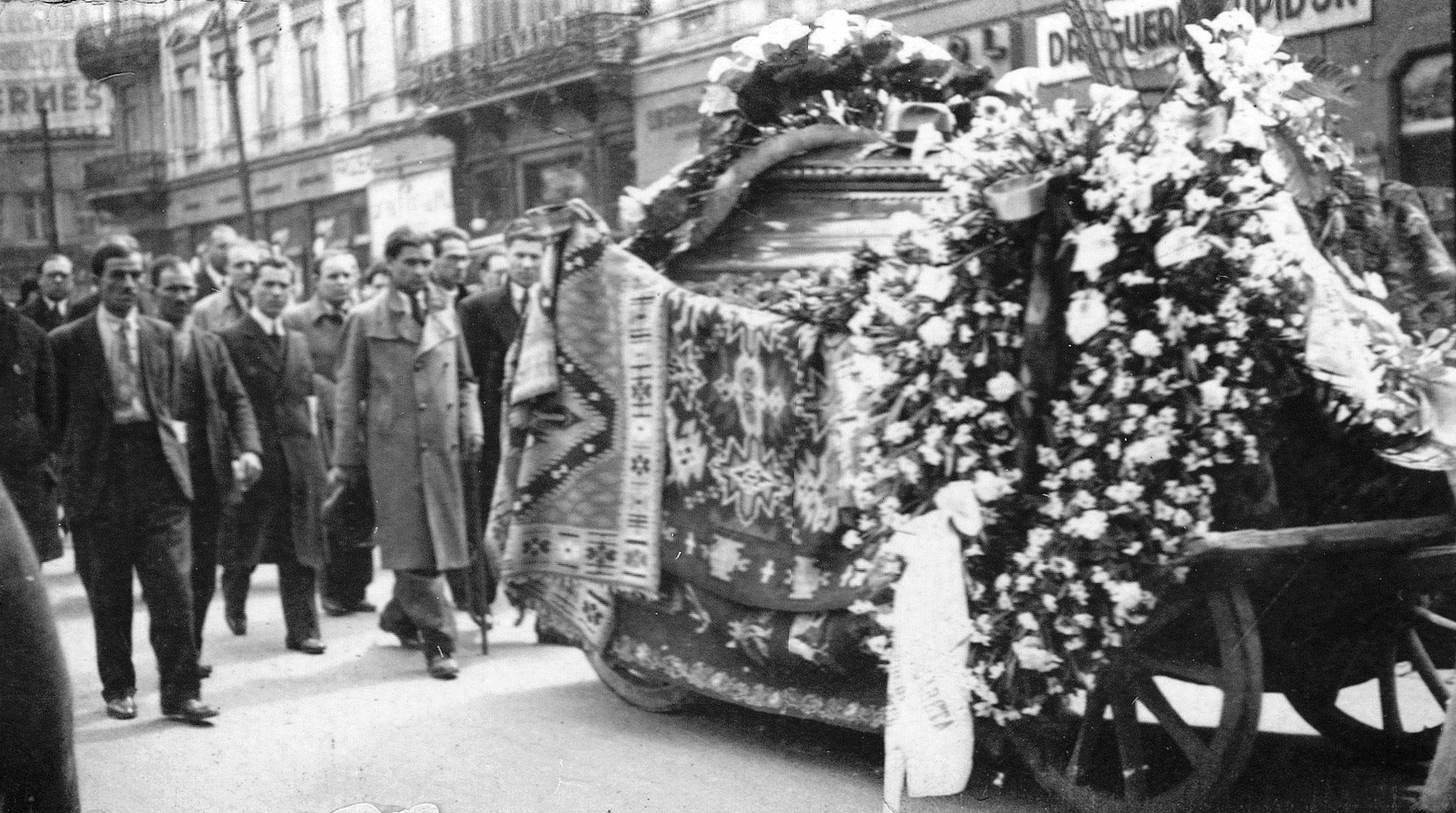
Stelescu and other Crusade members at Panait Istrati's funeral, April 1935

At a time when both Stelescu and Istrati were dead, Talex claimed that the three of them had formed a blood-brotherhood pact in December 1934. In April 1935 Istrati died from tuberculosis in Bucharest. He had been unable to support himself during his last months, and relied on government handouts—an appeasement that was much ridiculed from the far left. An independent Trotskyist newspaper, Proletarul, claimed that the Stelists had supervised Istrati's funeral ceremony, driving away his leftist friends. During mid-1935, a group of Crusaders, answering to Talex and to Istrati's widow Margareta, showed up in Baldovinești, where Istrati's mother was buried. They attempted to exhume the body for reburial in Bucharest, but were stopped by the enraged locals (including Istrati's maternal uncle).

=== Under Stelescu ===
The Stelists were intensely courted by other far-right organizations, with which the Guard was competing for the nationalist vote. The Crusade was especially close to the National-Christian Defense League (LANC), from which the Guard had split almost a decade before, and envisaged the creation of a "united front" against democracy and "the radical left". In March 1935, a Crusade delegation attended a LANC's national congress. The state monitored such agreements, which also involved the Romanian Front, and reported that the Crusade was in the process of merging with the LANC. In April, Naționalul Vâlcii journal introduced Cruciada Românismului (put out from Emil Costinescu Street 17, Bucharest) as one of the seven major "Romanian nationalist newspapers", commended for promoting "liberation from underneath the heel of those alien to our kin, our religion, our race".

The LANC merger never took place. In September 1935, the group rejected claims that it was negotiating any alliance, and announced that it had formed a Study Center to "work on the Crusade's core platform." It also alleged that the Guard was making efforts to buy up the brand name Cruciada Literară, once used by a cultural magazine, in order to "create confusion", thus diminishing the impact of Stelism. Also that month, the Crusade sealed a pact with the right-wing "Georgist" Liberals and Grigore Forțu's extremist Citizens' Bloc of National Salvation. This three-pronged alliance aimed at involvement in national politics. The "Georgists" had also formed a cartel with the People's Party (PP), which had previously been one of the three most powerful parties in Romania. The "Georgist"-Populist alliance, or "Constitutional Front", came to include both the Stelists and the Citizens' Bloc. Writer Ion Sân-Giorgiu, who led the Georgist chapter in Târnava-Mare County, went public with his opposition to this alliance, outraged that Forțu and the Stelists had shouted anti-Carol slogans in his presence. He was expelled from the party due to his insubordination.

PP leader Alexandru Averescu was working to gather as much support as needed for prompting Carol to hand him power. His plan backfired: on one hand, the Stelists did not necessarily endorse the idea of a new Averescu government; on the other, the PP moderates protested against Averescu's cohabitation with fascist groups. On November 14, 1935, the Crusade held its first national congress—noted by Iorgulescu for its elevation of late Istrati to a cult status. Stelescu proposed that a chair be left empty, to mark that "though he may be dead, we still keep him in our midst." Also in November, Caradja renounced his position in the Crusade and "plastered the capital's billboards with manifestos of his new party. The name of its organization is National Front and it demands the consolidation of extreme right-wing forces." He and Stelescu reconciled a while after, and had daily consultations with each other at the Athenee Palace. By early 1936, the Constitutional Front still existed, but the PP had effectively withdrawn from it.

Meanwhile, the Crusade was preparing to settle scores with the Iron Guard. In late 1935, Stelescu, who was facing trial for his earlier involvement in Guardist agitation, was arrested for contempt of court. While waiting for him at the Palace of Justice on November 8, Caradja and Lecca found themselves violently attacked by "those who see Mr Stelescu as a traitor." Another important figure who came into contact with the Crusade at that stage was Gheorghe Beza, an Aromanian dissident of the Iron Guard, famous for his earlier involvement in political conspiracies. He was expelled from the Guard in January 1936, shortly after suggesting that Stelescu was being slandered by Codreanu.

Some months later, youth active in Stelescu's movement cooperated with Gogu Rădulescu's Democratic Students' Front against an Iron Guard student protest, which they helped cancel. The Crusader press hosted detailed reports about the contacts between Codreanu and King Carol, noting that the Guard enjoyed free publicity "in the official and semiofficial press", and even that government money was being spent on manufacturing Guardist insignia. Stelescu revealed his rival's "small but effective tricks, which he used to recruit gullible peasants", and claimed that, as part of his previous engagement with the Guard, he had to speak publicly in lieu of Codreanu, who "had nothing to say." More disturbingly for Codreanu, Stelescu was publishing information regarding secret contacts between the Guard and the royal mistress, Elena Lupescu, as well as statements implicating Codreanu in the Duca assassination and questioning his Romanian ethnicity. Journalist Sándor Cseresnyés includes this effort, which also involved denunciations of Codreanu by the former Guardist Negrescu, in the "enlightenment campaign" mounted by Crusaders, who thus "struck the far-right myth at its roots." Both Stelescu and Beza visited Armand Călinescu, the Minister of Internal Affairs, providing him with a full record of the Guard's policy on assassinations.

During early 1936, prosecutor Alexandru Procop Dumitrescu ordered a re-investigation of Duca's murder, examining Ceapraz and Beza as witnesses. Stelescu himself already expected to be assassinated by the Codrenists, and repeatedly taunted his adversaries, instructing them to shoot him, but "not in the back". Cseresnyés, who first met Stelescu in April 1936, shortly ahead of Istrati's commemoration by the Crusade, notes that: "He was full of energy and listed a lot of things to do." When discussing Istrati's death, however, Stelescu allegedly confided, to his peers' disbelief: "I feel clearly, as today, that my death is not far away." Another eyewitness, Ion Ionescu-Căpățână, quotes him as saying: "Our enemies are many. Dangers lurk everywhere. Istrati has left us, and it is certain that I shall follow him in no time". He "was constantly guarded by his followers [and] kept telling his wife that sooner or later he will be killed, but that he wanted to keep on fighting for as long as he could." Also then, Stelescu discussed politics in an interview with Raza newspaper. Asked to elaborate on why he had formed a splinter group, he cited Codreanu's "political incompetence and all-encompassing ignorance", as well as the Guard's "sanguinary extremism". He mused that, since "I don't do compromises and I know too much", he himself had been slated for liquidation. In May, orders were issued to arrest both him and Codreanu, for another case of contempt of court. On that occasion, fifty Crusade affiliates signed an open letter noting that the Guard had placed an order for Stelescu's killing, and that he needed to be granted police protection.

=== Stelescu's assassination and aftermath ===
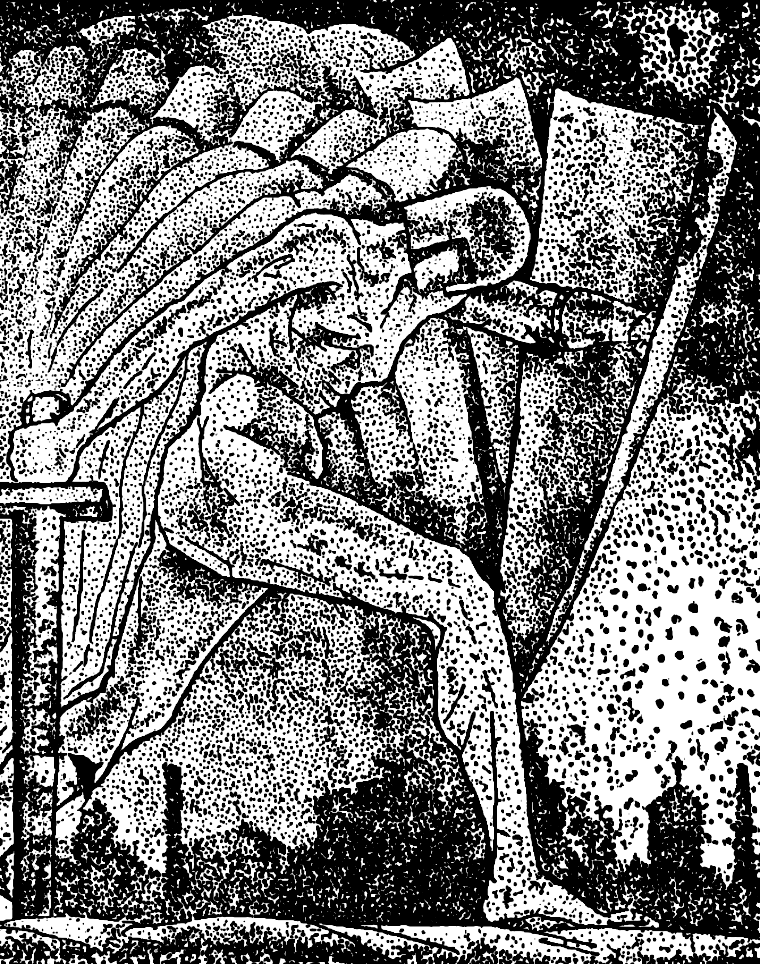
Crusader propaganda illustration, November 1936

A Decemviri death squad, comprising ten Theology students, had formally received Codreanu's blessing at the Iron Guard Congress in Târgu Mureș a few weeks before. On May 1, the Iron Guard paper Cuvântul Argeșului announced that Stelescu had been sued by Octav Stetin, who edited a magazine also known as Cruciada. It predicted: "[Stetin] will surely succeed in unmasking and castigating that intellectual twerp, who will later receive to the fullest his other punishment: that owed to him for his betrayal." Returning to Brăila on June 6, Ceapraz was pounced upon and seriously injured by two members of the Guard. On June 21, at Sibiu, Cruciada Românismului correspondent Gheorghe Scovarză was stabbed in the head. Found in a pool of blood, he was taken to hospital in critical condition. On June 29, the Crusade's offices in Galați were damaged by unidentified vandals.

On July 14, 1936, the death squad made its first move on Stelescu, ambushing him as he arrived for one of his meetings with Caradja. He was able to chase them with the loaded pistol that he now always carried on him. Later that month, Stelescu was recovering at the Brâncovenesc Hospital, where he had undergone an emergency appendectomy. Seizing on this opportunity, the Decemviri stormed into the hospital building and shot Stelescu to death. This murder left an enduring mark on public memory because of its ritualistic nature: Stelescu's body was not just riddled with bullets, but also bludgeoned or hacked to pieces. It was condemned by Nichifor Crainic, hitherto a propagandist for the Guard, who published a rebuke in his Calendarul newspaper. Allegedly intimidated by the Guard, Prime Minister Gheorghe Tătărescu ordered that Stelescu's burial in Bellu Cemetery take place with relative haste and secrecy; despite such efforts, "about a hundred members of the Crusade of Romanianism appeared at the cemetery and vowed revenge." Funeral orations were delivered by Talex and a workers' delegate, Iorgu Manu; the party song, Imnul cruciat, was played as the casket was lowered into the ground.

The orphaned movement still counted among its members some relevant figures in Romanian politics. Nicolae Rădescu, a Romanian Land Forces general, was an affiliate, and, according to some sources, became the Crusade's leader upon Stelescu's murder. The killing also brought in a new recruit: the barrister Emil George Caliga, who made it his mission to prosecute Guard leaders for their role in the "monstrosity". Also active as a Crusader around that date, poet Dimitrie Batova, was an old socialist, and had afterwards been an associate of Stelescu inside the Guard; by July 1936, he was using the Crusade as a platform toward criticizing local teachers' syndicates. A special meeting was convened on July 23, 1936, with Caliga, Talex, Stoenescu, and P. V. Huică among the speakers for the intellectual classes, and Gheorghe Tănase as a proletarian representative. The Crusade appealed to Rădescu to assume the "presidency of the executive committee", or "take over as leader of this political organization". He was in any case the decision-maker, and probably contributed to the movement's financing, while also sporadically publishing anticommunist and anti-Guardist opinion pieces in Cruciada Românismului, to October 1936.

Registered with Averescu's PP, Rădescu was a stated enemy of the political establishment. In 1933, upon presenting his resignation from the army, he had accused "profiteering politicians" and the king's "camarilla" of commercializing military life. In March 1936, he was head of the Constitutional Front in Arad County, and represented it in snap elections for an Assembly seat. Reporting the news of his being invited to take over the Crusade, Opinia newspaper speculated that the Stelists were a front for the PP. In August 1936, Rădescu read a pamphlet that had been written by Ion Moța on behalf of the Guard. He identified it as a direct threat aimed at himself and at Averescu; he replied by ridiculing Codreanu, and by noting that Romania was approaching conditions resembling the Spanish Civil War.

Around the time of Rădescu's ascendancy, some Crusade followers were also turning to illegal methods of financing: in August, police detained four Crusade members who had impersonated activists of the FDS—itself endorsed by the underground Romanian Communist Party. They allegedly used this cover to collect funds from left-sympathizing workers. In their illegal newspaper, Scînteia, the communists alleged that Stelescu's killing had been masterminded by Tătărescu, who had been ordered to do so by Codreanu himself. Similar claims were aired by the Danubian Review, which had it that the Târgu Mureș conspiracy had been "convened at the expense and with the help of the State." The same magazine contrarily alleged that the Guard had intended to warn Tătărescu not to honor his promise of "suppressing the movements of the right wing."

On Saint Michael's Day (November 8, 1936), the Crusaders gathered to commemorate Stelescu at Bellu; they also established a new political lodge in Bucharest's Blue Sector. Another such meeting was held on November 22, the party's second anniversary, with visits to Calea Victoriei 142 and the Bellu gravesite; they paid homage to Stelescu's blood-stained sheets and death mask. Caradja, as the head of ceremonies, asked the "hundreds of Crusaders" present to make a pledge that they would honor Stelescu's legacy; his message was endorsed by Vasile C. Dumitrescu, as general secretary of the Crusade. Other speakers included Manu, who was leading a delegation of Bucharest workers, Huică, as leader of the Crusade branch in Oltenia, Grigore C. Gonza, who spoke for the Crusader population in Transylvania, "Crusader Jod", who presided over the sections in Western Moldavia, and a leader of the "Cross Brotherhoods", Eugen Silvestru.

Attacks by the Guard still continued at a steady pace, although, in his July 23 speech, Talex had demanded that Crusaders refrain from responding violently to Guardist violence. Stoenescu was left for dead after several Guardists attempted to lynch him in Galați in September 1936; in January 1937, affiliate Dumitru Ceapraz was injured by Guardist assailants on Bucharest's Berthelot Street. Shortly after, policemen raided the Crusade's offices and detained seven people, suspected of having conspired against public order. The following month, Codreanu staged a rally in Bucharest, as part of the Moța–Marin funeral ceremony. He and his followers were reportedly heckled as they passed in front of the Crusade offices on Calea Victoriei. Still other Crusade members were harmed by Codrenist attacks, and, within the Iron Guard, "Stelism" became a crime punishable by death. Nevertheless, Codreanu feared retaliation, and surrounded himself with body guards.

=== Disappearance and succession ===
Logo used by the Adonis circle in 1940–1941

Cruciada Românismului newspaper was in print until May 16, 1937, by which time some members of the movement had embraced other causes. Talex announced his resignation in September 1936, citing "ideological disagreements" with the new leadership. His example was closely followed with a walk-out of thirteen other high-ranking members, including Cavarnali, Manu, Constantin Barcaroiu, and Virgil Treboniu, as well as Cruciada Românismului editor Paul Bărbulescu. In late October 1936, the newspaper was being run from Caradja's home by Alexandru Mocanu, with Caradja himself as editor of foreign affairs, and Lecca as the national-policy analyst. Cruciada Românismului was also briefly managed by Ion Aurel Manolescu, who resigned for health reasons in December 1936. His Stelist colleagues reported that, on October 18, he had been attacked by "six Guardist beasts", who hit him with a sack of sand and a crowbar. Left jobless by January 1937, Scovarză tried to poison himself with a mix of Lysol and cocaine, being admitted into Sibiu's public hospital. Also moving on from the Crusade, Lecca was involved in arranging contacts between the mainstream National Peasants' Party (PNȚ) and communist cells. Beza was eventually accepted into the PNȚ, founding the antifascist Peasant Guards as its paramilitary section. In June 1937, he fended off rumors that he and Codreanu had reconciled. Instead, Mircea Mateescu returned into the Iron Guard, celebrating its fight against "the deep, massive, darkness of the Romanian Sodom".

In March 1937, Tătărescu clamped down on all paramilitary movements, banning political uniforms, including the Guard's green shirts and the Crusade's carmine shirts. Around that time, Caradja took over as Crusade leader. In June, at the height of the Decemviri trial, he resigned, to be replaced by an invalid Army captain, Gheorghe Beleuță; formerly a member of the LANC, he had stood in opposition to Cuza, and claimed to have been involved with the Guardists during their early years. Upon taking over, he announced that Caradja had severed all contacts with the Crusade, and also that Beza had never had "any link whatsoever with our organization." Ahead of general elections that December, Cavarnali had joined the rival Romanian Front, while Corbea was active within both the PNȚ and, secretly, the communist movement. Prince Caradja still tried to register the Crusade as a political party, with himself as chairman; Beza also reemerged, in November 1937, as leader of a "Workers and Peasants' Party", alongside lawyer Petre Vulpescu. His application for recognition by the Electoral Commission was rejected in January 1938.

Shortly after, King Carol staged a self-coup, banning all political groups. Under this regime, Beleuță published articles in his own newspaper, Luptătorul, claiming that Codreanu had arranged for all his competitors within the Guard to be killed, and that he himself was risking his life for openly discussing that issue. In late 1938, parties were replaced by a catch-all National Renaissance Front; in January 1939, it received the bloc adherence of 20 former Crusade activists, credited as such. These were: Barcaroiu, Batova, Beleuță, Huică, Caradja, Lecca, Mocanu, Scovarză, Talex, Treboniu, Toma Alexandrescu, Ion Crăcăoanu, Octav I. Goga, Ion de Hagiu, Alex. Jurăscu, Ion Piperiu, Cezar Popa, Ion Răducanu, Gheorghe Sandulovici, and Vasile Toclogeanu. In early 1940, Bărbulescu and Treboniu were running a poetry circle, Adonis, where they welcomed Tudor Arghezi, Cristian Sârbu, and the aspiring author Mihu Dragomir. In occupied France, Ionescu-Căpățână began publishing Istrati's Cruciada Românismului articles, in an edition which removed all their negative mention of Nazi Germany.

The Crusade disappeared, but Rădescu remained politically active into World War II, and was listed as one of Carol's more potent enemies. He survived the "National Legionary" episode of Iron Guard rule, when he was reportedly marginalized as a "Freemason". According to one testimony, the general was never forgiven by the Guard for having supported Stelescu. During the putsch of January 1941, Iron Guard assassin squads were on the lookout for Rădescu, who went into hiding. Beleuță openly supported Conducător Ion Antonescu in his purge of Guardists: in February, he published a message noting that the new regime had earned "my life and this body of mine, riddled as it is with bullets in the war for the Nation's unification". The eighth commemoration of Istrati's death, in April 1943, was marked by a ceremony organized by Talex and Manolescu, with poetic contributions by Dimitrie Stelaru, and participants such as Panait Mușoiu, Aida Vrioni, Ștefan Voitec, and Marcel Bibiri Sturia.

Some former Crusade members were already working at undermining Romania's involvement with the Axis powers. From 1940, Beza took to the anti-Nazi underground, redesigning the Peasant Guards as a "Free Romanian Movement"; tried for sedition, he was forced into exile. When, on Antonescu's orders, Romanian troops occupied Transnistria, Rădescu issued a formal protest and spent a full year in the concentration camp. In late 1942, as he was planning to defect to an Allied country, he began networking with the Zionist resistance, represented by A. L. Zissu and Jean Cohen, asking them to transmit their grievances through him. A channel for cooperation was established, though Cohen later claimed: "I was aware of Rădescu's antisemitic views, as well as of his not representing any political force or aspiration of the people". Meanwhile, Sergiu Lecca, who was the brother of Antonescu aide Radu Lecca, took part in informal negotiations between Romania and the Allies.

=== Final echoes ===
Eventually, the August 1944 coup toppled Antonescu and aligned Romania with the allies, while also legalizing the Communist Party. A passing mention by Alexandru Graur suggests that Talex had a part to play in the coup's preparation, as co-editor of the underground newspaper România Liberă. On October 9, the now-official Scînteia featured a retrospective on "Iron Guard crimes". In this context, it referred to Stelescu and his followers as: "Some members of the Iron Guard [who] were startled and sought a way out. They detested Codreanu and his crimes." Although still an anticommunist, Rădescu was brought to high office by the Soviet occupation of Romania, and, from December 1944, served as Prime Minister; for a while, Caradja was his chief of staff. The General refused to sanction Soviet abuse of power and clashed with the Communist Party, while pursuing war against Germany. Additionally, Rădescu was at war with the Iron Guard puppet government that was set up behind enemy lines—though it is still debated whether or not he actually protected those Guardsmen who did not defect to the Germans.

The toppling of Rădescu's cabinet in February 1945 was a new step toward the communization of Romania. Indicted as a crypto-fascist by the communist authorities, he escaped to New York City, where he helped form the Romanian National Committee (RNC). While planning his escape, he had kept contact with Beleuță and Caradja, who were trying to defend Rădescu's properties from being confiscated by the communists. As noted in 1948 by Alan R. McCracken, from the Office of Special Operations, Rădescu took financing from industrialist Nicolae Malaxa, who had previously sponsored the Iron Guard. Rădescu was also endorsed by PNȚ-ist diaspora cells, but favored a rapprochement with the Guard as the basis for continued armed resistance. This issue created a rift between the RNC and the Union of Romanian Jews, represented in exile by Wilhelm Filderman. At home, the RNC–Guardist cooperation was vilified by the Communist Party press, which suggested that, as the "former leader of the former Guardist dissidence known as 'Crusade of Romanianism'", the general had assimilated, and was reusing, Codreanu's methods. The surviving membership of the Crusade was also hunted down by the Romanian communist republic. According to aviator Ion Coșoveanu, who was for long a political prisoner, Stelists were a distinct faction among the anticommunist underground. Coșoveanu (quoted by writer Niculae Gheran) recalled that, once in prison, Crusade members used to bicker with Iron Guard rivals. Coșoveanu also notes that the Stelist faction accepted into its ranks the poet Radu Gyr, until discovering that he was informing on them for the Guardists.

Corbea was vetted by the Securitate, and emerged as a poet laureate of the regime; in his published memoirs of the 1980s, he made virtually no mention of his political engagements on the right. Contrarily, Dem. Bassarabeanu's poetry was stricken from public memory by communist censorship, due to the author's fascist beliefs. Dragomir, albeit formally aligned with communist ideology, was investigated for a supposed teenage involvement with the Crusade. In mid-1945, Talex was networking with the Social Democratic Party (PSDR), joining its Socialist Group for Art and Culture and its press bureau (at least one other Stelist had registered with the PSDR by 1946). With the PSDR's absorption by the Communist Party, Stoenescu rallied with Ioan Flueraș, who had formed a splinter Socialist-Democratic Party—with Stonescu as general secretary. In 1946, communist Tudor Olaru regarded Talex, "that ex-ringleader of Cruciada Românismului", as a friend of Constantin Titel Petrescu, the anticommunist socialist, and therefore as an ideological enemy. He was overall spared communist persecutions, and was perceived by the authorities as a fellow traveler. Barcaroiu followed his professional path as a stage actor, and in February 1954 was decorated by the Great National Assembly for his artistic services. Similarly, Cavarnali was welcomed into the Party and then expelled by a review commission in 1950, alongside Dragomir; he spent his final decades as an editor of children's magazines.

Istrati's friend, Otilia Cazimir, obliquely mentioned his final political engagements in a 1960 memoir, defining him as "a man of contradictions". Cazimir speculates that Istrati would have returned "on the right path [of socialism]", had he not have been terminally ill. In 1964, I. Peltz also touched on the issue, concluding: "the shadows of the enigmatic being [Peltz's emphasis] that was Panait Istrati do nothing towards altering the value of his activity and work before these strange avatars. [...] His literary contribution—his authentic literary contribution, unblemished by vague and regrettable smirches—shall live through the ages." When Istrati was posthumously rehabilitated in the 1970s, Talex worked on publishing his manuscripts and his correspondence. As argued by cultural historian Zigu Ornea, Talex's work in this field makes a point of obfuscating Istrati's contribution to the Crusade, as well as Talex's own. Though reference works now contained ample detail on Guardist history, Stelescu was only allocated mention over "one or two phrases."

In the 1980s, Talex was allowed to discuss both aspects, but, as his critics note, made efforts to suppress information about Stelescu's far-right credentials. While attending a French literary congress in March 1989, he debated the issue with scholar Heinrich Stiehler, who had referred to Cruciada Românismului as the "organ of an antisemitic and xenophobic intellectual right". Talex contended that it was the magazine "of very young folks, whose principal animator, Stelescu, was to be assassinated by the Iron Guard"; his overview was supported at the time by exile journalist Ion Stănică, who noted that references to the Crusaders' "fascist ideology" were picked up from the communist regime's official propaganda. Stiehler and Iorgulescu responded with research into Stelist propaganda, and, overall, with an analogy between Stelescu and Ernst Röhm—who, though a victim of Nazism, "was not conferred status as a democrat."

Crusade of Romanianism people
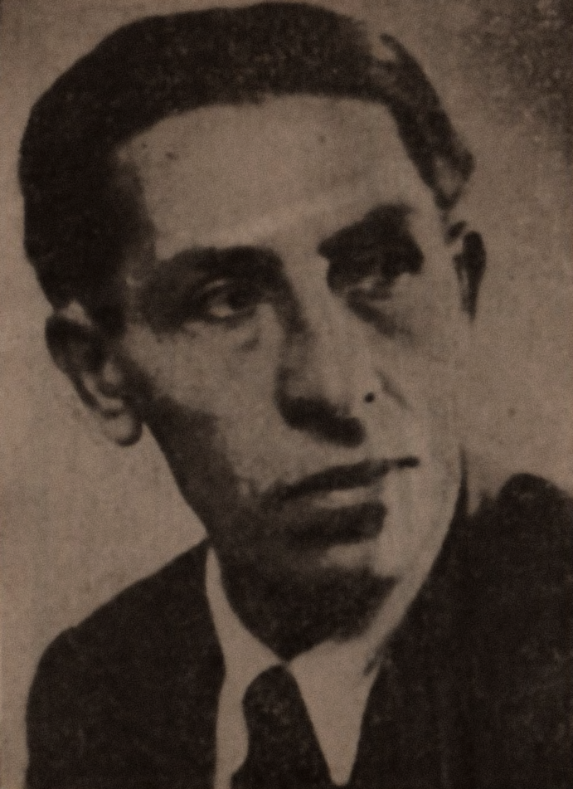
Constantin Barcaroiu (1935)

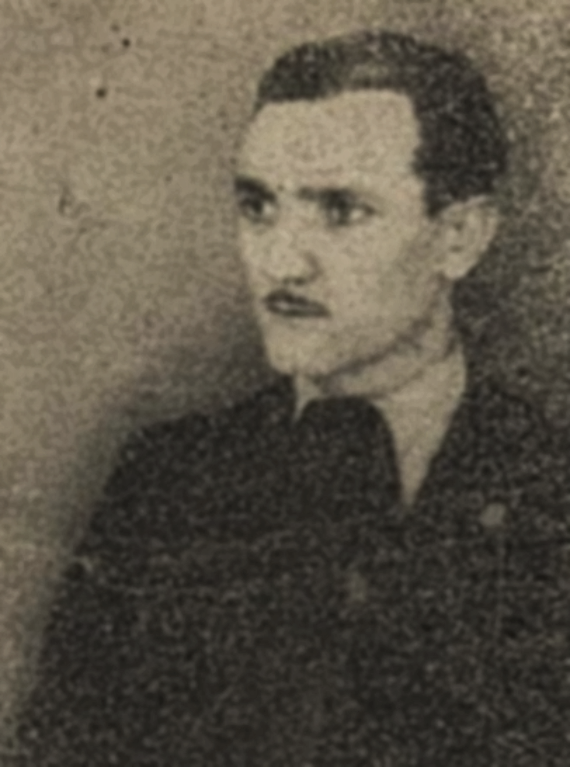
Dimitrie Batova (1935)

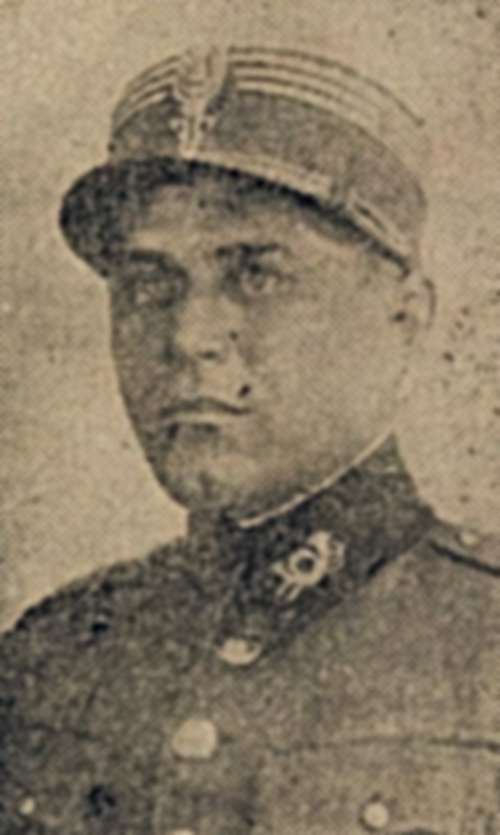
Gheorghe Beleuță (1928)

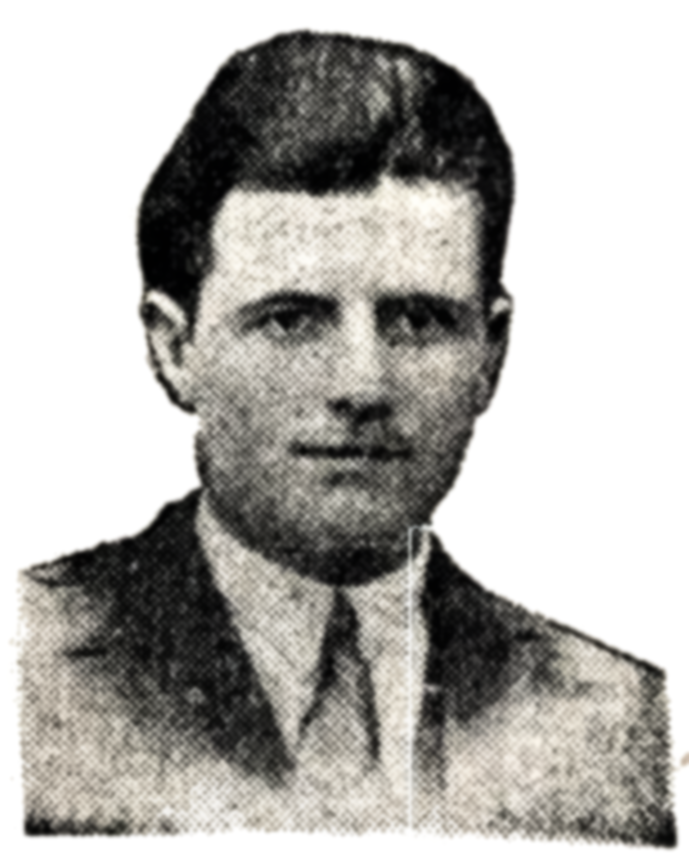
Gheorghe Beza (1936)

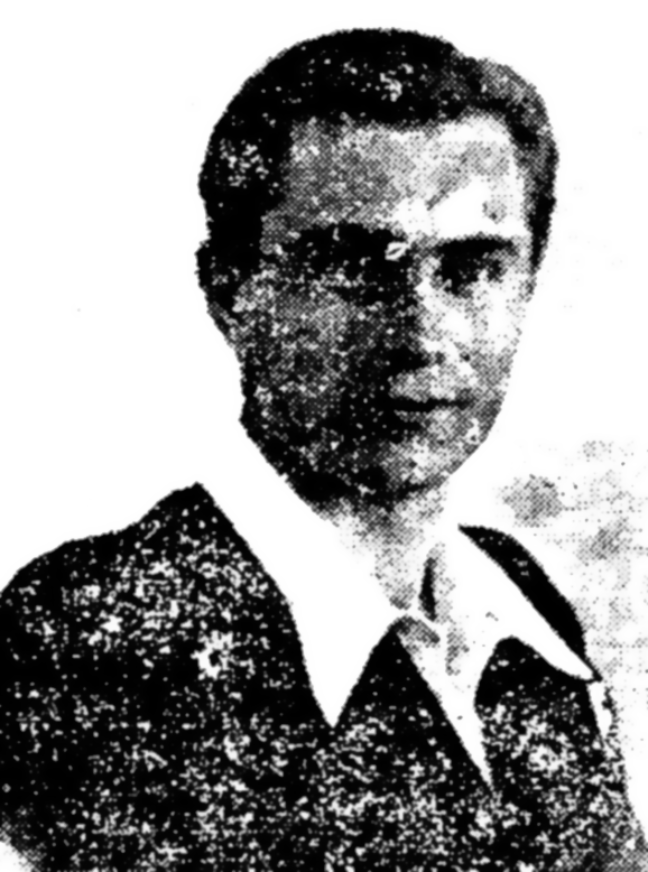
Vladimir Cavarnali (1935)

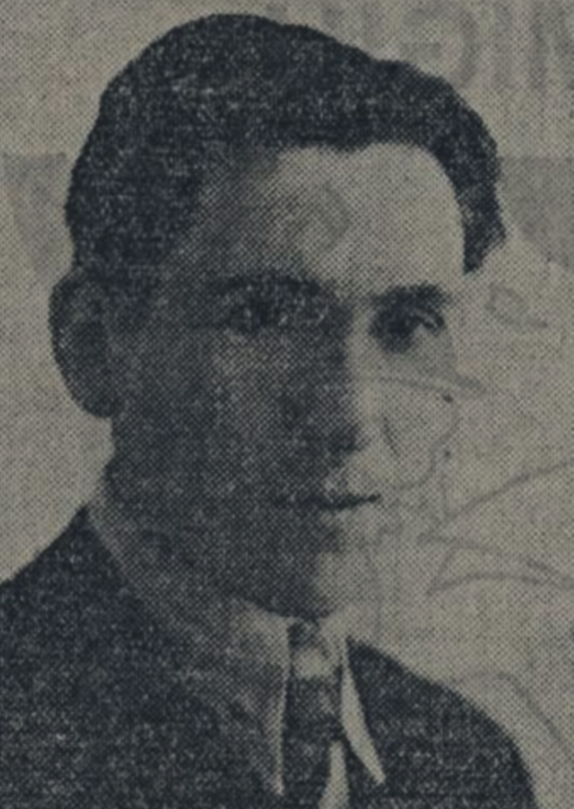
Dumitru Corbea (1937)

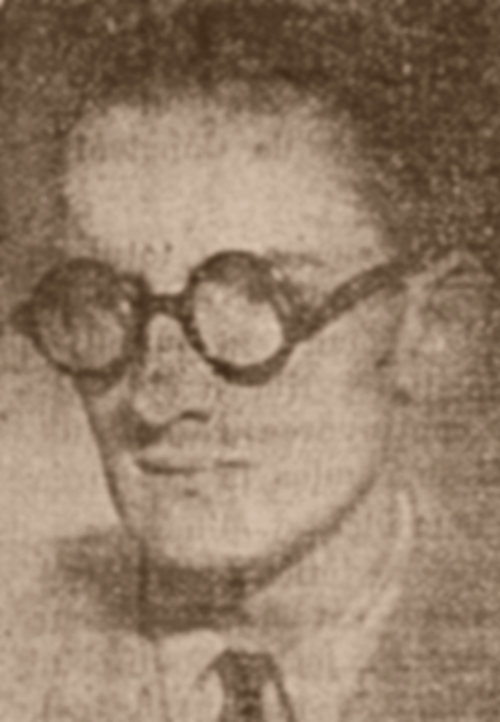
Constantin Virgil Gheorghiu (c. 1941)

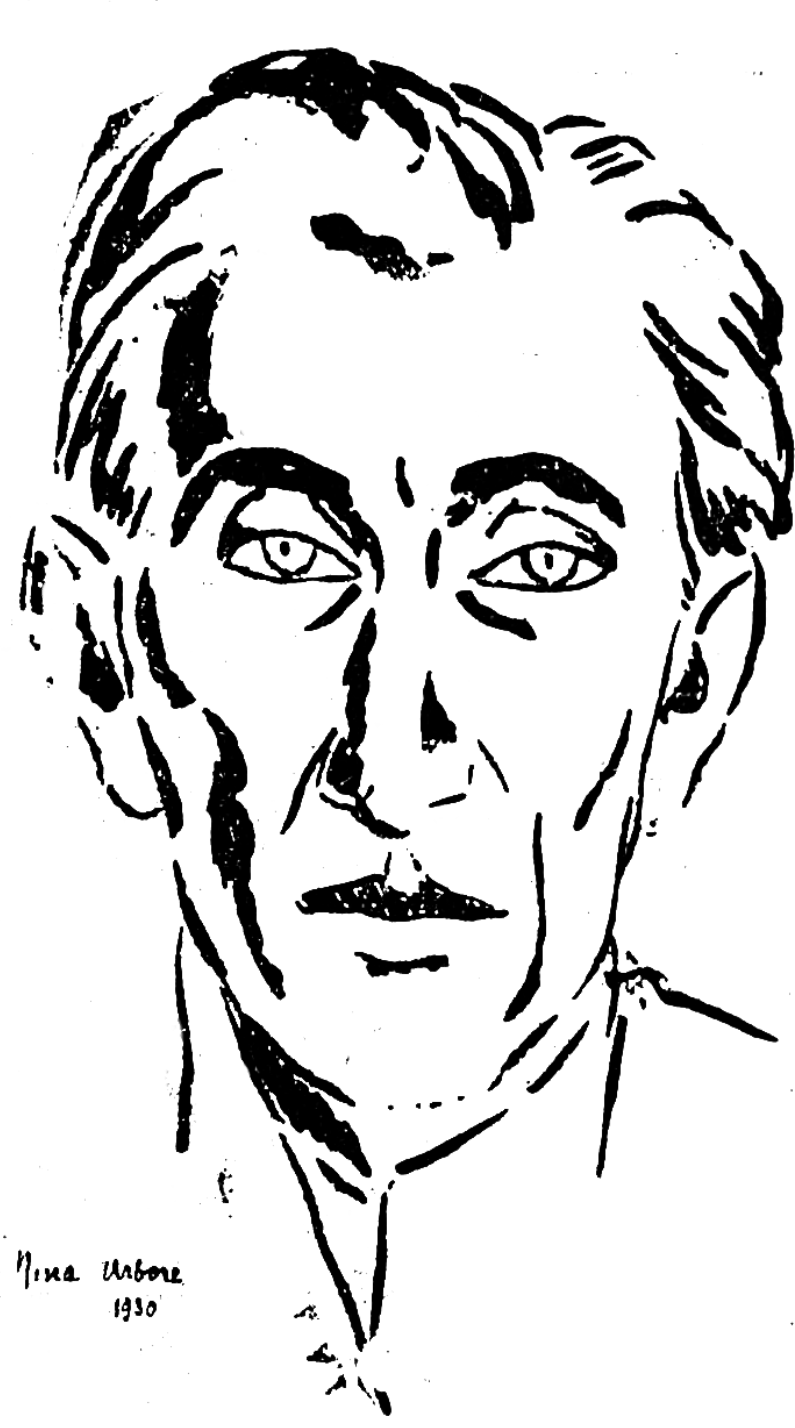
Panait Istrati (1930 portrait by Nina Arbore)

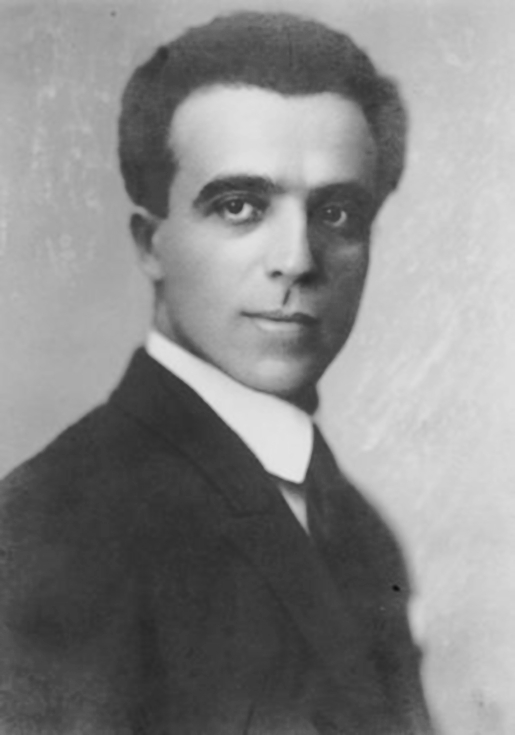
Alexis Macedonski (c. 1910)

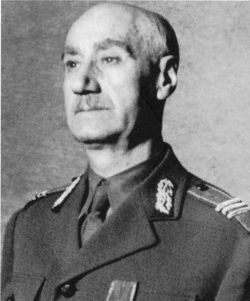
Nicolae Rădescu (1944)

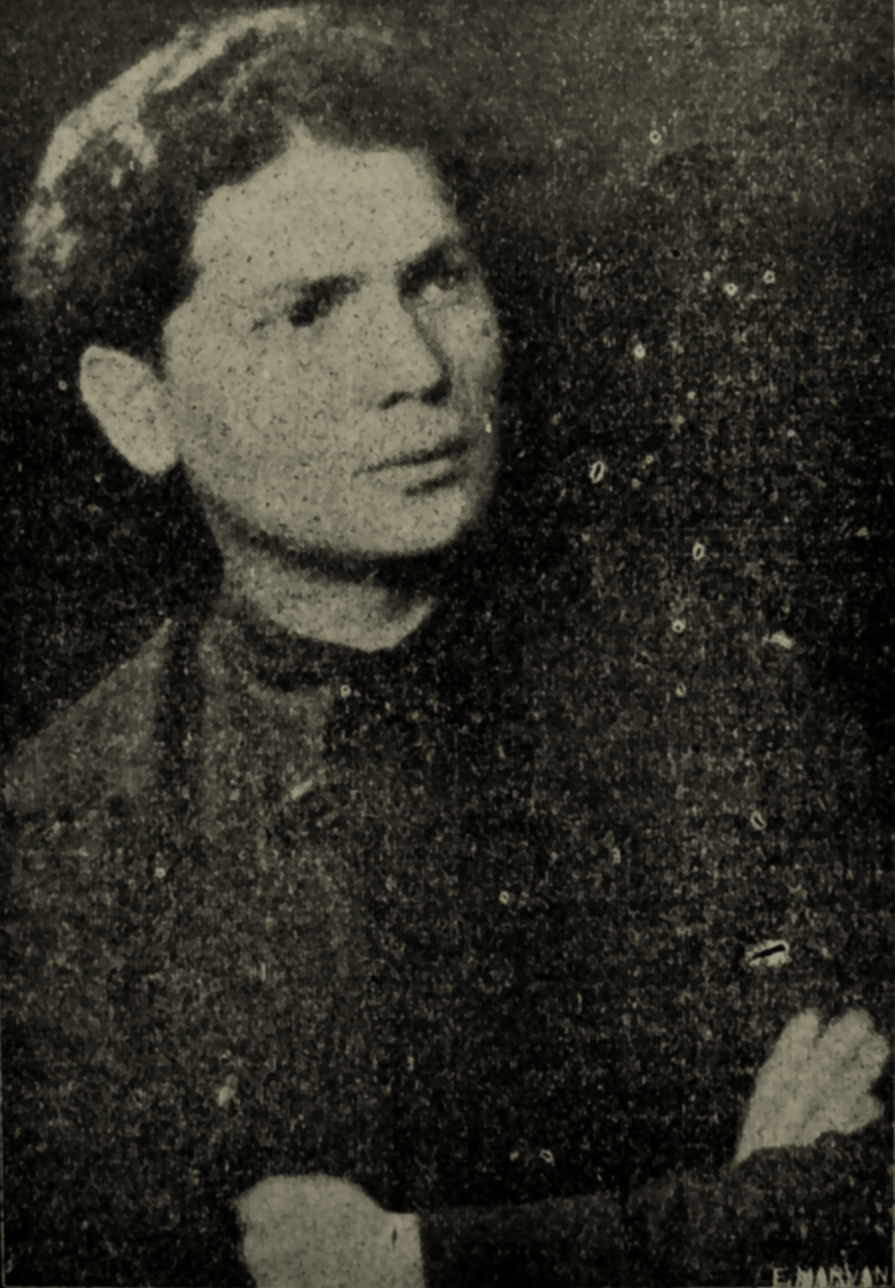
Mihai Stelescu (1936)

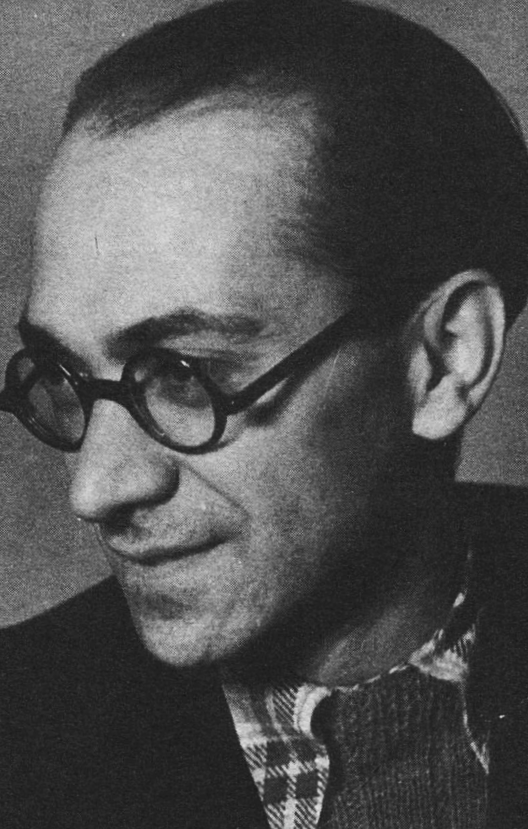
Alexandru Talex (1940)

== Ideology ==
=== "Confusing the extremes" ===
Political historian Stanley G. Payne describes the Crusade as distinct among the Romanian fascist groups: "a tiny organization which sought to target workers and to inspire socioeconomic transformation." Among contemporaries, Cseresnyés saw the Stelists as "the only [Romanian] fascist group with a clear plan for labor. This is said to have been drafted by Panait Istrati." In June 1936, Crusader Hornetz described the entire movement as adhering to "Panait Istrati's line of thought." Writing Stelescu's panegyric the following month, "Iorgu Manu, worker", suggested that Stelescu had "learned from Panait Istrati that the world is divided into good people and bad people" (Manu's emphasis). Thus, "in a future Crusader state, [Stelescu] said, all must work who are guided by honesty and truth", manual workers and intellectuals alike.

Istrati himself gave conflicting accounts of his role in the party. In one of his letters, where he paraphrases the Stelist program, he notes: "Ours is a national movement for economic change, for civic education and for social combat. We are against capitalism, oppression and violence." In a January 1935 piece in Cruciada Românismului he contrarily notes (Istrati's emphasis): "once I shunned that criminal communism I briefly believed in, my definitive option was not to adhere to anything. What do I mean by that? I mean that I no longer believe in any idea, in any party, in any man. By logical consequence: there is nothing that would determine me to take on the role of a militant for any doctrine or program. I AM THE ETERNAL OPPONENT." Within the party, there was always a degree of assimilation between fascist trappings and far-left causes, indicative of Stelescu's indecision. In a draft letter completed shortly before Stelescu's murder, sociologist Anton Golopenția, who wrote for the political magazine Dreapta ("The Right"), assessed that Stelism, like Strasserism, represented a struggle of "permanent revolutionaries" against the more pragmatic "radical intellectuals [or] leaders in contact with the bankers". He therefore advised Dreapta not to accept Stelescu's offer of collaboration. In March 1935 Eugène Ionesco, the left-leaning literary columnist, noted that Stelescu's newspaper made a habit of "confusing the extremes". Ionesco was referring to Cruciada Românismului's appreciation for the socialist poetry of Liviu Bratoloveanu. The appropriation of leftist ideas was especially apparent after Beza's co-option, and during the Crusade's involvement in the international Istrati scandal. When he first publicized his pact with Stelescu, Istrati specified an "absolute requirement that the Crusade keep itself equally distant from fascism, communism and the antisemitism of hooligans." In his first-ever editorial column, Stelescu derided all political uniforms, and implicitly all political extremes, stating: "one can believe in something without donning a colored shirt, just as one can wear a colored shirt without believing in anything." He demanded a "united front" of "fearless warriors", entirely cut off from all preexisting ideologies. Nevertheless, Stelescu had personally selected green-colored shirts as the Iron Guard uniform, before his own movement settled on carmine.

The group was entirely against the parliamentary system, but harbored two distinct currents when it came to supplanting it. Stelescu himself wrote that "democracy sickens us", since it had resulted in inept governance "by a mass of nitwits". The movement viewed liberalism and human rights with suspicion rather than hostility, since, as Barcaroiu noted, they left the door open for "capitalism and politicking". By January 1936, Stelescu had expressed admiration for the PNȚ's program to reform Romania into a "peasant state", but contended that the program was inapplicable as long as Romania was under a "defective political system". Istrati, meanwhile, had expressed dissenting views. In its Christmas 1934 issue, Cruciada Românismului published his "Letter to... the Right", which called democracy "putrid" but described dictatorship as an unsound regime: "Dictatorship, of whatever kind, signals that the social organism has grown old. It is the system that will suppress in its adversary all his fighting means, to take them over for its own use, like an old man who ties up a robust youth and then proceeds to beat him up at his own convenience."

Cseresnyés also notes a discursive transition in Stelescu's politics: "[his April 1936] speech was an extended declaration of his faith in human rights. Stelescu, the extremist Iron-Guard Stelescu of two years ago, fiercely argued for human rights, and would sacrifice his own life for them." A leftward shift followed: in a Cruciada Românismului article appearing shortly before his own resignation in September 1936, Talex spoke of communism as a "flawless doctrine" and "mankind's only salvation for the future", but called out the Soviet incarnation as "red fascism". He argued that Leon Trotsky's critique of the Soviet state had validated all of Istrati's prophecies on this subject. In a 1940s manifesto, Ionescu-Căpățână argued that Talex "was the weakest, for being the gentlest", and that he lost control of the Crusade due to a coordinated attack by the communists (who called him a Trotskyist) and the Guardists (who "seized control of his movement and his periodical").

Immediately after Talex's article and resignation, the Crusade's "leadership committee" published a "letter of clarification", which claimed that "three or four" members had been expelled from the Crusade as agents provocateurs. These had "sought to discredit the movement by presenting it as supportive of the communist credo." Caradja now issued a set of commands which reiterated that: "A love of one's country is not a monopoly of the right, just as social aspirations are not a monopoly of the left." Caradja declared "integral equality among the Romanians" to be the ultimate goal of Stelism. The solutions he imposed were explicitly favorable to the cooperative movement "in all economic fields", with emphasis on agricultural rationalization; a minimum and maximum wage were included in his list of promises, but Caradja also argued for free trade ("the simple law of supply and demand") when it came to the internal market.

=== Italian influence ===
Beyond its anticapitalism, the Crusade had as its main characteristic a strong connection with Italian fascism, as opposed to Nazism. Historian Francisco Veiga describes this as being a necessary repositioning against "Codreanu's Germanophilia"—when Nazi Germany and Italy where still competing with each other in Southeastern Europe. The Danubian Review rated Stelescu's group as "Fascist in its ideology", pointing out that Istrati's "entrance into its lists" gave it a "distinctly Social Fascist character." According to Cseresnyés, Stelescu, as the "Romanian Strasser", was "purely fascist" in his outlook: "The Crusade fights against communism, for the consolidation of the workforce on a fascist basis, for recruitment in the villages, and to a lesser extent against the clergy, but it must be admitted that it always uses 'European methods'." Other historians likewise stress the Crusade's anti-Nazism. F. L. Ford also writes that Stelescu's "dramatic forecasts" are notable protests against the Guard's Nazification. According to Armin Heinen, Codreanu's celebration of Nazism as an international phenomenon had turned Stelescu's attention toward Benito Mussolini as the alternative.

Mussolinian apologetics peaked in February 1935, with a topical article in Cruciada Românismului by Tudor Ionescu. Its publication elicited a strongly critical response from Istrati. As Talex recalls, Istrati was always bothered by Stelescu's homages to Mussolini, and, on one occasion, threatened to withdraw from the common enterprise. One of his last articles, published posthumously in May, made some concessions, by noting: "Between communist terror and fascist terror, the latter is less inhumane and is the only one that does not engage the working class as responsible, since fascism states no claim of governing either 'through the people' or 'in the people's name'." Stelescu had nuanced his own take on Italian influence that March, when he wrote: "Fascism has its pluses and minuses, we can note both, we will admire Mussolini as a great creator who has rescued his country from the claws of communism, but that and only that. We retain but one thing from Fascism, namely its experience."

Stelescu rated Adolf Hitler as a "great German", but warned that German imperialism could prove itself usable against Romania, and that the "National-Socialist experience", being industry-focused, was untranslatable in Romania, the home of an "agricultural people". Heinen paraphrases Stelescu's message: "he feared [Germany] would impose upon Romania the status of a colony." Among the party rank and file, Grigore C. Gonza had served time in prison for having insulted the Romanian Army from the position of a "Hitler advocate." An April 1935 piece by Lecca hinted at "some despicable deeds" carried out by the Nazi Party, while also suggesting that Hitler had managed to bring about a revolution in world affairs. He assessed that, unlike the Western democracies, Hitler's regime could be trusted to protect Romanians from Soviet encroachement. In August of that year, Stelescu was reportedly invited to attend the "Hitlerite congress" in Nuremberg, but declined, insisting that his group was "uncommitted to either right- or left-wing actions".

Shortly before his death, Stelescu further explained that he regarded neither Mussolini, nor Hitler and Karl Marx, as theoreticians to follow, but that the Crusade would still not "integrate with the middle line of democracy." Also then, he was ridiculed for his claim that Crusaders nu sunt nici pungași de dreapta, nici de stânga ("neither fraudsters on the right, nor on the left"—with the implication that they were a third kind of fraudsters). Talex claimed the same, shortly after Stelescu's killing: "the 'Crusade of Romanianism' is neither right- nor left-wing, and neither is it democratic. It is one of the Romanian people, bent down, fleeced, assassinated by 'apostles', 'captains', and 'dictators'." During his interval as leader, Caradja also contended that a new bloc of "nationalist dictatorships" was breaking through the last internationalist institutions, including Soviet ones—with the Italian invasion of Abyssinia and the Spanish Civil War as evidence of this geopolitical shift.

The subsequent transition led the surviving Crusaders to fully rethink their relationship with fascism. In October 1936, Gonza argued that his group was opposed to the emergence of a Nazi-backed Hungarian irredentism, but also that Romanian nationalists and the German-speaking Transylvanian Saxons were natural allies in this dispute. In November, Alexis Macedonski was interviewed by Il Popolo d'Italia, describing the Crusade as "an anti-communist organization for national revival", still commenting on its similarities with Mussolini's ideology. Also that month, Caliga wrote about his and his party's disenchantment with Mussolini, who had decided to back the Kingdom of Hungary; as Caliga put it: "We stood with Italy, praying for its victory [in the Abyssinian war]. [...] And now this great Italy, this eternal Italy, with its most authoritative voice, joins up, beyond the horizon of peace, with a vengeful and agitated people, stirring up such discord". His colleague I. Valoda noted in December that Mussolini had created a "black internationalism", and that "fascist tyranny and communist tyranny [are now] just as cruel". In one of his final appeals to fellow Stelists, Vasile C. Dumitrescu reiterated that the group was "neither on the right, nor on the left, nor on the center". By then, Caradja's list of Crusader principles included demands to censor "any kind of propaganda against our Motherland's inner balance and against its national directive." He proposed "friendly relations with all other countries", though still favoring those nations which "may grant us advantages, be they economic or political."

=== Istrati's "spiritual movement" ===
According to literary historian Angelo Mitchievici: "Interestingly, [the Crusade] had stated its dissidence and a distinct position within the Iron Guard movement. Perhaps it was the group's marginal, dissident status that appealed to Istrati. [...] Even if, in this very context, Panait Istrati endures as a freelancer, he could not have evaded the abusive assimilation into a direction that did not truly reflect his affinities." Istrati's own political preferences were veering toward libertarian socialism and anarchism. Inspired by Gandhism, the "Letter to... the Right" advised against all forms of political violence. This formed a basis for Istrati's assimilation by Cruciada Românismului, since, according to Talex, "our gazette only interprets and allows the political on the basis of an individual's sound spiritual reality. The 'Crusader intellectual' [...] analyzes and assimilates life at a superior organic level, which supposes that he not only create laws and truths, but also that he brings them into society." In 1936, Octav I. Goga added that the "Crusader doctrine" would engineer a nonviolent revolution through the "internal transformation of one's inner soul in libraries, in laboratories, or on construction sites." Cseresnyés argues that "Stelescu and Sergiu Lecca [...] were spiritualists rather than materialists, who examined external phenomena rather than the essence of things".

Istrati himself came to describe the Crusade as "rather a spiritual movement". According to Ornea, this was a naive assessment, and evidenced the degree to which Istrati was being "manipulated" by Talex. Scholar Jean Hormière suggests that Istrati's articles in Cruciada Românismului share in the illusions of politics, including "calls to violence, 'Crusader' language, a cult for the great heroes", their only value being of a documentary kind. For Istrati's adversaries on the left, the Crusade involvement was in itself proof that Istrati was a covert fascist. The allegations were publicized by two of Istrati's former colleagues in international communism, Henri Barbusse and Francis Jourdain. According to such sources, Istrati's "mercenary literature" and his contributions to a "fascist newspaper" earned him some 50,000₣, paid for by big oil. Overall, Trotskyist commentators were more lenient, writing off Istrati's inconsistencies as a sign of his perennial nervous instability. Istrati made a point of responding in Stelescu's paper, under the headline "The Objectivity of the 'Independent' Communist Press" (March 21, 1935). He was publicly defended by his friend, the anti-Soviet leftist Victor Serge, who described Istrati's last combat in verse:

You lay upon your press clippings, like Job upon his ashes
quietly spitting the last bits of your lungs,
in the faces of those copy-pissers

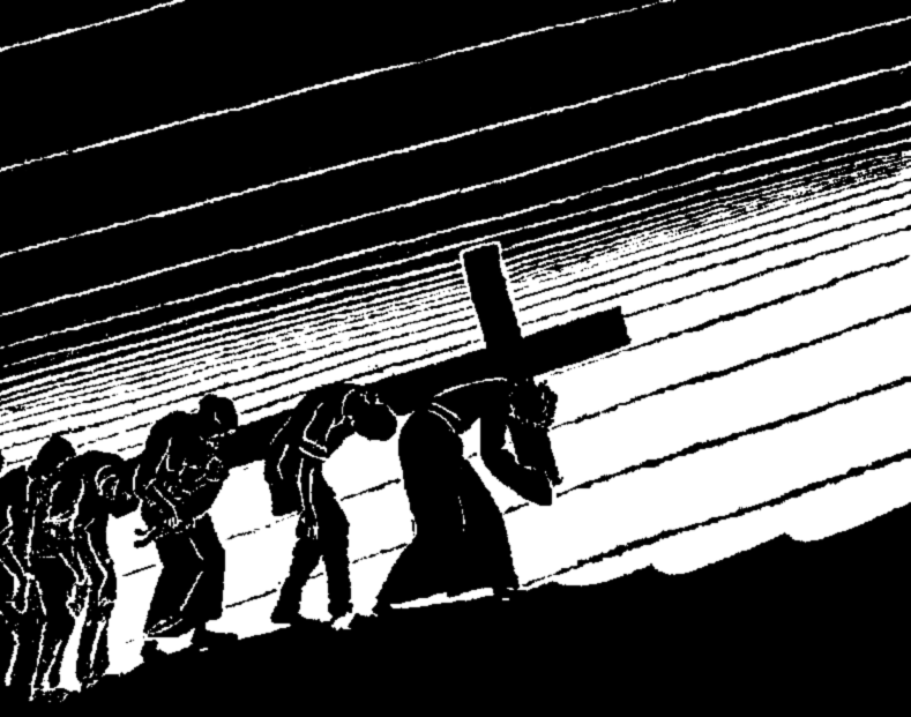
The Calvary as a collective task; Crusader illustration, October 1936

Istrati's connection with the Crusade was not his only contact with right-wing radicalism: he had also promised to have his political testament printed in Gringoire, a newspaper of the French far-right. Against Talex's disclaimers, several later exegetes have reanimated the debate about Istrati's possible fascist leanings. Historian Jean-Michel Palmier includes Istrati's name on a list of "intellectuals [who] saw for a moment in fascism the possibility of arousing a crisis-struck Europe from its lethargy." He is in the company of Knut Hamsun, Ezra Pound and Wyndham Lewis. Among Stelescu's Guardist adversaries, Ernest Bernea appreciated Istrati's zest "for light and freedom", adding: "Panait Istrati had returned, perhaps unwillingly so, where he had a duty to always endure. [...] His return among us has touched us deeply. His final effort has brought him closer to us in sentiment." Bernea was nonetheless adamant that Istrati could still not be taken for a spiritual guide, given his "discombobulated personal experiences, however authentic and original these may be".

Philologist Tudorel Urian asks: "Who really is Istrati: the frantic socialist he was before his visit to the USSR [...] or the nationalist of his very last months, the emblem of a Guardist periodical? There is something that those who judge him rarely take into account: in the periods when he flirted with socialism [...] and Guardism, both movements where in their romantic, idealistic stages. Once he came face to face with the brutal realities of the Soviet regime, Istrati broke with socialism and perhaps his famous motto, je ne marche pas ['no, I won't bite'] would have come into play in relation with the Guardists, should he have lived to see their earliest crimes."

=== On antisemitism and Christianity ===
The Istrati scandal touches another controversial aspect of Stelist policies: their Iron Guard-inherited antisemitism. Stelescu sent the message in November 1934, when he criticized ethnic minorities for monopolizing the job market: "Factory positions for Romanian workers, our own kind first and if anything is left we would gladly share it with the foreigner, if he is indeed in need of." In December 1934, Cruciada Românismului alleged that 20 of 25 white-collar workers at Fero-email in Ploiești were "foreign elements", also noting that the largely Romanian yardmen had to endure squalor and disease. Another piece, authored by a pseudonymous "Sergiu", highlighted differences between religious Jews, whom the Crusade appreciated, and "atheistic Jews". He identified only the latter group with the Communist International, as well as with the "tight circle of Jews that currently runs Russia", arguing that anticommunism was not the same as antisemitism. Cruciada Românismului noted with satisfaction that Russian nationalism was making its comeback in the Soviet Union. Reading the Soviet press, the Stelists remarked that references to the International and the cause of proletarian internationalism were being discarded, and that Mother Russia was returning in force.

In an issue of that same period, Cruciada Românismului informed taxpayers that local publishing houses were disproportionately staffed by Romanian Jews, and took public funds to promote Jewish writers—nominating Camil Baltazar, Ion Călugăru, I. Peltz, Isaia Răcăciuni, and Ilarie Voronca. In a March 1935 article (seen by Iorgulescu as "remarkably semi-learned"), Stelescu denounced Jewish assimilation as a "false aspiration to Romanianness", contending that, "as we stand", the Jewish community as a whole was "anti-Romanian". On such grounds, he refused to be called "antisemite", since applying that label to himself would have introduced a "false notion"; while he condemned anti-Jewish violence as "hooliganism", he also explained that the "Jewish Question" would eventually be solved through a "national revolution". In that context, Lecca stated that Hitler had been unfairly maligned by "Jews from all over the world". Overall, Stelescu's newspaper was noted for its obstinate claim that Jews were a rootless, disloyal race.

According to Veiga, Istrati "toned down the antisemitism of Stelescu and his followers, but the [Stelist] Movement continued to be a far-right one." Also, "the disillusionment he felt toward Soviet communism did not manage to make Istrati into a fascist; quite the contrary, he was the one to influence Stelescu, making him renounce, for instance, his antisemitism." In his papers of 1935, Istrati presents himself exclusively as an enemy of "the Jewish bourgeoisie", a class he describes as "corrupt, pseudo-humanitarian, pseudo-democratic" and accuses of stirring up scandal. Istrati's articles in Cruciada Românismului are more adamantly philosemitic. One of them, "A Letter to Love", led to a series of articles on the subject, from Stelescu and other Crusade people. In his own articles, Talex answered for the Stelist movement: "Panait Istrati, do you know what it is we need? A fist... The Crusade of Romanianism will attempt to become that fist... Our antisemitism? Just the same as yours: a humane one. But it is also combative, for as long as the Judaic element shall attempt to set up a state within our own state, sabotaging us with any opportunity it gets". After Istrati's death, Stelescu explained to Raza that he did not militate for the Jews' segregation: "In my view, races exist on the worldwide scientific social level. On the national level, as a political and moral reality, there exist two human categories: good and bad people, as loosely defined by their competence and morality."

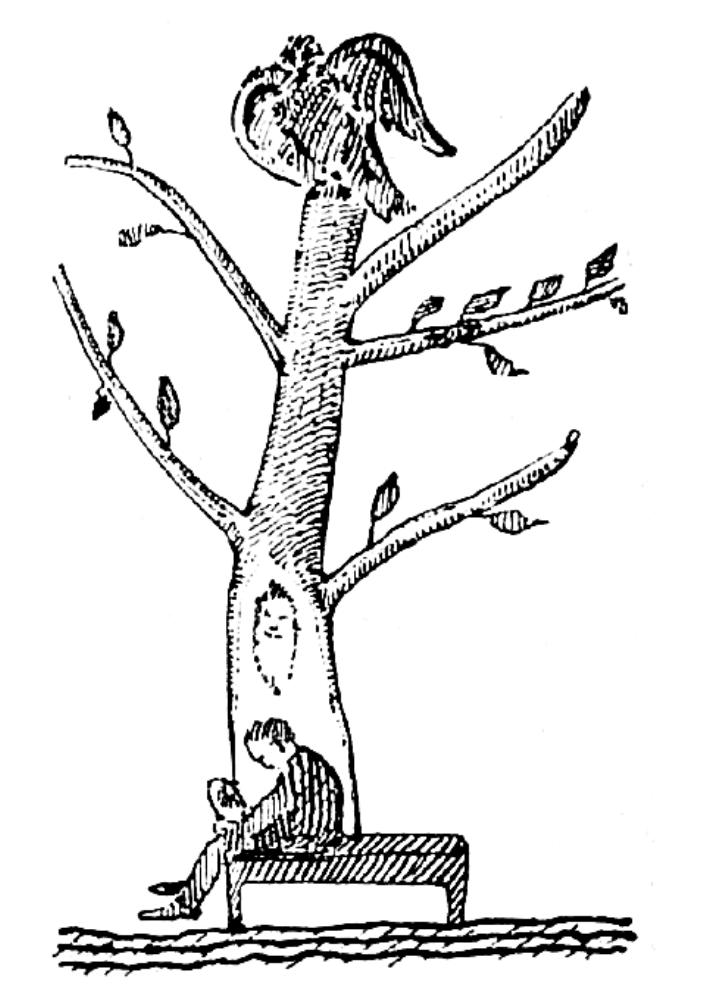
A satirical take on "the Romanian eagle" as "the guiding principle of Romanianism". 1929 cartoon by Nicolae Tonitza

The Crusade's agenda was debated among Jewish Romanian intellectuals. Fellow writer Mihail Sebastian described Istrati as politically "illiterate" and "addled". In his words, "Mr. Istrati fights nowadays for the Crusade of Romanianism, searching for the formula of reasonable antisemitism (neither here nor there), for the way into a more gentle chauvinism, for a nice agreement between his anarchic vocation and a methodical process of bashing heads in." Other Jewish literary figures, including Josué Jéhouda, issued statements in support of Istrati's stance. The Crusade may have contextualized its antisemitic reflexes within a pro-Christian bias. The American Jewish Committee papers describe the Crusade as "a Fascist group which did not have anti-Jewish tendencies", quoting Stelescu's statement "that he was not a Jew-baiter and that, although his party was nationalist, it was inspired by genuine Christian principles."

According to at least one account, the ailing Istrati was in the process of becoming a militant Roman Catholic. Stelescu's movement, which resented the secularization of public affairs, contrarily expressed its admiration for Romanian Orthodoxy: "And if some church servants have indeed trespassed, faith itself is not to blame. The belief in God and The Cross is a banner and support for our combat, and the token of our coming victory." Scovarză decried Codrenism's links with popular Orthodoxy, exposing Viorel Trifa's "undermining of religion and morals" from within the Army of the Lord. As late as September 1936, Corbea was chiding Orthodox priests for neglecting their duties, noting that such behavior was undermining the church itself. As Corbea writes: "The 'Crusade of Romanianism' has begun the struggle of awakening the mystified masses, those who have been driven astray by fake varieties of Christianity [...]. It would therefore be an error to even conceive of the Crusade as an anti-Christian movement." The Crusade believed that its mission included protecting Christian interests against the consequences of modernity. It was critical of feminism, noting that Christianity itself had liberated women, had given them status and purpose. However, it also asserted that woman was "the guardian angel, always in the shadow of man." Feminism, meanwhile, was "equality in vice." The Stelists also accused the Soviet Union and its Romanian sympathizers (for instance the staff of Cuvântul Liber newspaper) of mounting an international campaign against Christianity.

=== Defining "Romanianism" ===
When Stelescu founded his "White Eagles", the right-wing nativists, the centrists and the advocates of left-wing nationalism in Romania had been disputing over the concept of "Romanianism" for over a decade. The idea of a homegrown ideological current of that name was swiftly embraced by intellectual sympathizers of the Iron Guard, among them Nae Ionescu, Nichifor Crainic, Alexandru Randa, Traian Brăileanu and Mihail Manoilescu. An alternative Romanianism, liberal and skeptical toward nationalist rhetoric, was being promoted by the philosophers Constantin Rădulescu-Motru and Mircea Eliade, who demanded the continuous Westernization of Romanian society. This variant was explicitly linked to Stelescu's movement in a July 1936 article by Grigore Filipescu. It called Stelescu a "romantic misfit", and viewed assassination as: "forty-five bullets and an axe against [ideas from] the latest book by Professor Rădulescu-Motru." Before he was won over by fascism, Eliade defined Romanianism as "neither fascism nor chauvinism—rather, the mere desire to realize an organic, unitary, ethnic, balanced state".

The Crusade's version of the concept borrowed from all sides of the debate. In some of the first issues of Cruciada Românismului, Stelescu was nostalgic about his time in the Guard, and alluded to the Crusade as an intact version of Guardist ideology; in that context, he referred to the "regeneration of Romanianism" as shared objective of all far-right movements, achievable once Codreanu will have been ousted. In his "democracy sickens us" essay, he proposed: "Romanianism is the only credo that might invigorate this nation. Solutions for its sons, from its bosom, within its spirit, on its soil". As noted by Iorgulescu, he entertained thoughts of elevating Romanianism into an "original totalitarianism", and wanted to give intellectuals the task of defining and testing its applications.

Stelescu's final published article was a critique of other Romanian nationalist ideologues—including a former ally, the Romanian Front's Alexandru Vaida-Voevod, but also Ionescu and Octavian Goga. These were accused of hypocrisy, for having embraced Guardist antisemitism and anti-Masonry after decades of being involved with either Jewish businessmen or the local Freemasons. Crusader Emil Vora argued that, in his final year, Stelescu had become an avid follower of Rădulescu-Motru; Vora explicitly viewed their shared Romanianism as centered on class collaboration. According to his Cruciada Românismului, Stelescu was reading from Rădulescu-Motru's eponymous work on what became his deathbed. An obituary penned by Crusader Gh. Manolache depicted Stelescu as especially favorable toward the peasant class, who would form the core of his "Crusader state". Stelescu had evisaged villages being uplifted by teams of political activists, including educators and agronomists. According to Manu, the Crusaders were recruiting their own social and political elites, but these were in fact set aside by their wish to return man "to the clay that man was originally made of."

As described by Talex, this brand of Romanianism was "noble and creative", Istrati being its leading exponent. When first introduced to Gandhism and the Ramakrishna Mission in 1930, Istrati himself had declared: "To me, the Occident is dead"; Crusaders posthumously described him as: "born as a vagabond, lived as a loner, died as a Romanian." In its search for authenticity, Cruciada Românismului also partook in the campaign against modernist literature. In December 1934, it hosted a literary review by scholar I. E. Torouțiu, who informed readers that modernists were foreigners, citing a German statistic which alleged that only 7 in 400 young writers were "authentically German". Talex, who once described himself as a "know-nothing" in political matters, had for a personal idol the nationalist historian Vasile Pârvan. He was especially inspired by Pârvan's critique of "formalist literature" and his Russophobia, both of which colored his reading of Istrati's work. Talex's admiration for "Romanianism" opposed him to the more cosmopolitan liberals of the day, prompting the Crusade's journalistic attacks against Eugen Lovinescu, the modernist doyen of Romanian liberalism. Lovinescu (who had been Talex's high school teacher) was called "a con artist" in Cruciada Românismului.
