= Arise Gheorghe, Arise Ioan! =

Poem by Radu Gyr

- by Radu Gyr
- Original title: Ridică-te, Gheorghe, ridică-te Ioane!
- Country: Romania
- Language: Romanian

Arise Gheorghe, Arise Ioan! (Romanian: Ridică-te, Gheorghe, ridică-te Ioane!) is a poem by Radu Gyr. In 1958, the communist authorities of the Romanian People's Republic imprisoned Gyr and sentenced to death because of the poem; the sentence was commuted to life imprisonment, and he was pardoned in 1964. The poemcalled on peasants to resist the regime's agricultural policies by every means, and was written during the last, brutal wave of collectivization in the countryside. According to Orthodox priest Fabian Seiche, Gyr was denied medical treatment in prison, was often starved, and was even tortured.

The poem remains controversial in Romania. Literary critic Alex Ștefănescu finds the poem is "full of drama, of great expressive power", a work in which "communism itself is transfigured and appears as a metaphysical evil". He argues that the poem is unrelated to Gyr's past membership in the fascist Iron Guard and can be read on its own terms; he proposes a thought experiment: "If we did not know that Radu Gyr he was a legionnaire in his youth, we would not see anything legionary in this poem. It is about a cry of revolt against communism, in the tragic years when our peasants were forcibly dispossessed of their land by the Soviet occupiers, in complicity with the Romanian communists". By contrast, the critic Nicolae Manolescu considers the poem "literary mediocre", yet he also emphasizes "the confusion between Gyr's legionarism and the anti-communism of the poem".

Nu pentru-o lopată de rumenă pâine,
nu pentru pătule, nu pentru pogoane,
ci pentru văzduhul tău liber de mâine,
ridică-te, Gheorghe, ridică-te, Ioane!

Pentru sângele neamului tău curs prin șanțuri,
pentru cântecul tău țintuit în piroane,
pentru lacrima soarelui tău pus în lanțuri,
ridică-te, Gheorghe, ridică-te, Ioane!

Nu pentru mânia scrâșnită-n măsele,
ci ca să aduni chiuind pe tăpșane
o claie de zări și-o căciulă de stele,
ridică-te, Gheorghe, ridică-te, Ioane!

Așa, ca să bei libertatea din ciuturi
și-n ea să te-afunzi ca un cer în bulboane
și zarzării ei peste tine să-i scuturi,
ridică-te, Gheorghe, ridică-te, Ioane!

Și ca să pui tot sărutul fierbinte
pe praguri, pe prispe, pe uși, pe icoane,
pe toate ce slobode-ți ies înainte,
ridică-te, Gheorghe, ridică-te, Ioane!

Ridică-te, Gheorghe, pe lanțuri, pe funii!
Ridică-te, Ioane, pe sfinte ciolane!
Și sus, spre lumina din urmă-a furtunii,
ridică-te, Gheorghe, ridică-te, Ioane!

Translation:

It is not for the sake of a bread on your table,
it is neither for pastures and nor for the stock,
it is rather for living a peace which is stable:
arise brother Gheorghe, arise brother Ioan!

For the sake of your kinsmen who died in the ditches
for the hymns that you sang as you stood in the dock
for the tears of the heavens, as you pained in the shackles
arise brother Gheorghe, arise brother Ioan!

It is not for the anger resounding your body
it’s instead for the sake of your cry to the world,
for the distant horizons with a brimful of planets,
arise brother Gheorghe, arise brother Ioan!

If you wish to regain all the ancestral freedoms,
through the heavenly gates your admission to gain,
break to pieces the shackles which are cutting your body,
arise brother Gheorghe, arise brother Ioan!

As prostrate you may wish once again to embrace
all that’s left from the blaze of your family’s hearth
they all gently come back to take hold of your soul
arise brother Gheorghe, arise brother Ioan!

Arise brother Gheorghe, by freeing your shackles!
Arise brother Ioan, back again on your bones!
Alight to the Heavens, the tempest abated,
arise brother Gheorghe, arise brother Ioan!

In November, 2012, Romanian politician Mihail Neamțu sparked outrage by reciting the poem at a campaign event. Neamțu defended himself, stating that his intention by reciting the poem had been to honour victims of the Nazi Holocaust and Soviet Gulags.
