= Iron Guard death squads =

1930s Romanian paramilitary death squads

The Decemviri and Nicadori, along with Codreanu, were exhumed and given a lavish burial service in November 1940.

During the 1930s, three notable death squads emerged from Romania's Iron Guard: the Nicadori, the Decemviri and the Răzbunători. Motivated by a combination of fascist political ideology and religious-nationalist-mysticism, they carried out several high-level political assassinations in the inter-war period.

== Theoretical background ==
Death was a central part of the Iron Guard's ideology. Its members, known as "Legionnaires", were officially asked "to embrace death" if needed; in practice, they were supposed to be ready to both give and embrace death—in other words, to be willing to assassinate their political enemies at the risk of their own lives. This "Legionnaire's death" was widely celebrated. For instance, the second verse of the hymn used by the Guard's youth wing is:

Moartea, numai moartea legionară
Ne este cea mai scumpă nuntă dintre nunţi,
Pentru sfânta cruce, pentru ţară
Înfrângem codrii şi supunem munţi;
Nu-i temniţă să ne-nspăimânte,
Nici chin, nici viforul duşman;
De cădem cu toţi, izbiţi în frunte,
Ni-i dragă moartea pentru Căpitan!

Death, only a Legionnaire's death
Is our dearest wedding of weddings,
For the Holy Cross, for the country
We defeat forests and conquer mountains;
No prison can frighten us,
Nor any torture, or enemy storm;
If we all fall, hit in the forehead,
Death for the Captain is dear to us!

The Guard aligned itself with the Romanian Orthodox Church, which prohibits murder. However, it had ways of justifying the notion of "giving death" (a notion its founder, Corneliu Codreanu, never fully explained, as he was given to laconic pronouncements).

Codreanu noted that, given the opposition the Guard faced from the state, other political parties, and the media, the Legionnaires had made "the decision to embrace death". The 'death squad' is the expression of this determination, shared by all Legionnaires in the country. It means that these youths are willing to accept death. They are willing to move forward, through death". He suggested that in pursuing their goal, "a new Romania and the long awaited revival of this Romanian nation, the aim of all our efforts, struggle, and sacrifice", the Legionnaires were ready to sacrifice themselves, to become martyrs for their country.

It was during the Legionnaire-dominated Students' Congress of April 3–5, 1936, held at Târgu Mureș, that the death squads were officially established. However, writing in The Nest Leader's Manual, which appeared in May 1933, Codreanu taught: "A Legionnaire loves death, for his blood shall cement the future Legionary Romania". In 1927, at the Guard's very creation, its members swore to be "strong by severing all ties connecting us with mundane things ... by serving the cause of the Romanian nation and the cause of the Cross". By claiming to renounce material wealth and invoking the Cross, the Legionnaires were channeling Christ: they believed they would die for the nation as he had died to redeem mankind. Vasile Marin, who made important contributions to Legionnaire doctrine, amplified on this notion when he praised the Nicadori in 1934: "Three young students have committed an act in the service of a great cause. You all know what that act was. Their sacrifice was inspired by a great idea. It was done in the name of a great idea. They performed this act, and now they are paying the price."

For the Legionnaires, the murder of a political enemy or a traitorous comrade meant sacrificing oneself for a greater cause: the Christian religion, one of mercy, was thus transformed into an ideology of murder. They drew inspiration from Codreanu himself, who had planned a large number of political assassinations with Ion Moța, and who had killed a policeman in Iași in autumn 1924. At his trial for that deed he proclaimed, "it was my faith and my love of this country that guided me in this struggle, in everything I did. We pledge to fight until the end". He was acquitted, as was Moţa (who shot Vernichescu, the man who revealed the assassination conspiracy, seven times, albeit not fatally); both were acclaimed as heroes.

As assassinations rendered their perpetrators heroes, they became a sought-after activity for Legionnaires, and Codreanu further enticed them: "The day after the victory of the Legionnaires we shall convene an Extraordinary Tribunal called upon to judge, for high treason: ... all those who, in defiance of the laws of this country, persecuted, imprisoned, or otherwise caused harm to the Legionnaires and to their families ... no one shall escape judgment". Codreanu's former deputy Mihai Stelescu, after leaving the Legion, publicly accused Codreanu of sacrificing young men for the advancement of his own career, and of devising a type of murder based on "manipulation of the masses", using others as assassins and leaving them to face justice.

Furthermore, Legionnaires were animated by the idea that the nation included both the dead and the living, with its heroes providing assistance to the latter when invoked. This element of their ideology involved an authentic mystique of the idea of dying for one's nation, as those killed in the course of their duties automatically became heroes who could continue to support their living comrades' undertakings. This enthusiasm for death motivated Moţa, who went to Spain to die for Romania so that (as he believed) his country would be redeemed in God's eyes, as well as in the death-exalting literature produced by that segment of the intellectual élite which had proved receptive to Legionnaire ideas: Mircea Eliade, Radu Gyr, Constantin Noica, and others.

The Legionnaire's death was amply practiced. Many gave their lives certain that the movement and the national cause would be strengthened; they never hesitated to kill in the name of the same idea. Aside from the three cases discussed below, Iron Guard members were responsible for the Jilava Massacre at the eponymous prison on the night of November 26–27, 1940, when 64 political prisoners, 46 officers and guards, and a number of military detainees were killed; the murder of Nicolae Iorga and Virgil Madgearu that same night; other killings during the National Legionary State; and the deaths of hundreds of officers, civilians, and Bucharest Jews during the Legionnaires' Rebellion and Bucharest Pogrom.

== Nicadori ==
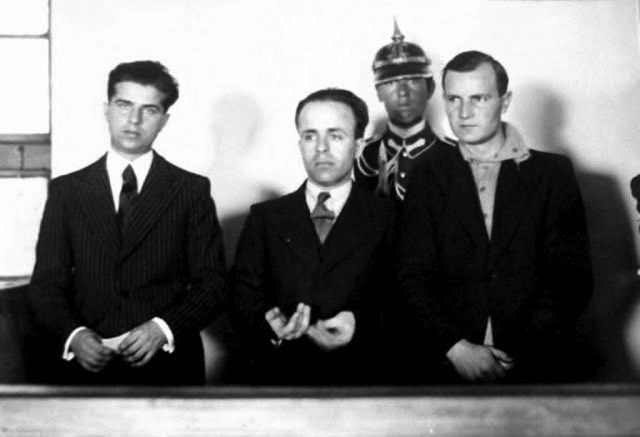
The Nicadori on trial

The Nicadori assassinated Prime Minister Ion G. Duca at Sinaia train station at 10:30 pm on December 29, 1933. This was the first major political assassination in Romania since Barbu Catargiu was shot in 1862. The Nicadori killed Duca because he had arrested thousands of Legionnaires during the 1933 election campaign, also leaving 18 dead; and because he had allowed for increased Jewish immigration while blocking that of Aromanians to Dobrudja. Their name was derived from the first letters of the group members' names:

- Nicolae Constantinescu, who fired the four fatal shots, was a student at the Commerce Academy in Bucharest.
- Ion Caranica, an Aromanian, was born in 1903 in Veria. He studied commerce in Thessaloniki and then Bucharest. He joined the Iron Guard in 1930, and fought for Aromanian rights.
- Doru Belimace, also an Aromanian, was born in 1910 in Malovišta, near Bitola. His family settled in Bucharest after World War I. He graduated from the University of Bucharest's Faculty of Letters; he attended its Faculty of Law at the same time but did not finish.

Arrested right away, the trio was sentenced to hard labour for life. While in prison, Caranica wrote a book on Aromanian issues, and Belimace, among other works, wrote Revoluția fascistă (The Fascist Revolution). They were all killed, along with the Decemviri and Codreanu, on November 30, 1938, while being transported to Jilava Prison.

== Decemviri ==
The Decemviri, so called because they numbered ten men, like their Ancient Roman equivalents, the Decemviri, shot Mihai Stelescu in his hospital bed between 38 and about 200 times on July 16, 1936. After shooting him, they cut him into pieces with axes and danced around the body of the victim. Four of those involved in Stelescu's execution were theology students. Stelescu had left the Iron Guard, forming the rival Crusade of Romanianism, and launching a series of public attacks against Codreanu. Codreanu could not abide this betrayal, although both he and the assassins (rather implausibly) denied he knew about the plan or had consented to it.

Ion Caratănase led the squad; its other members were Iosif Bozântan, Ștefan Curcă, Ion Pele, Grigore Ion State, Ion Atanasiu, Gavrilă Bogdan, Radu Vlad, Ștefan Georgescu, and Ion Trandafir. Arrested immediately, the men were sentenced to hard labour for life. They were all killed, along with the Nicadori and Codreanu, on November 30, 1938, while being transported to Jilava prison.

== Răzbunători ==
Răzbunătorii – the "Avengers" – pursued Prime Minister Armand Călinescu and assassinated him on September 21, 1939. Călinescu had been minister of the interior at the time of Codreanu's death, and thus had some connection with it. A few months after Codreanu was killed, King Carol's police uncovered a plot to exact revenge on Călinescu. Carol retaliated by ordering members of the Iron Guard rounded up and put to death without trial. The exact number executed was never known; estimates were as high as six thousand.

In response, nine young Legionnaires ambushed Călinescu while he was on his way to work. They were:

- Miti Dumitrescu (Codreanu's trial lawyer)
- Ion Ionescu (student)
- Ovidiu Isaia (photographer)
- Ion Moldoveanu (student)
- Gheorghe Paraschivescu (student)
- Cezar Popescu (student)
- Marin Stănciulescu (mechanic)
- Traian Popescu (student)
- Ion Vasiliu (draftsman)

They fired over twenty bullets into his body, also killing his driver and wounding his bodyguard. The assailants were caught shortly before midnight on the day of the attack. On King Carol's orders, they were taken to the spot where they had killed the premier. Huge floodlights from army trucks illuminated the area so that the assembled crowd could watch as the nine men were shot in the head with their own guns. The bodies were left under the lights for days. Above them was a large banner reading: De acum înainte, aceasta va fi soarta trădătorilor de țară ("From now on, this shall be the fate of those who betray the country"). Soldiers and police were given a free hand to deal with any and all suspected members of the Iron Guard, and thousands of young men were shot, hanged from telegraph poles, or tortured to death. A few hundred escaped to Germany.
