= Social poetry =

Social poetry is poetry which performs a social function or contains a level of social commentary. The term seems to have first appeared as a translation from the original Spanish Poesia Socíal, used to describe the post-Spanish-civil-war poetry movement of the 1950s and 60s (including poets such as Blas de Otero). Later, José Eduardo Limón, for example, has used it to describe Mexican-American Chicano poetry in Texas during the same period. Elsewhere, others have used the term to describe English-language poets such as W.H. Auden and George Bernard Shaw. Boston University has recently offered courses in “the social poetry of Central America.”

== Development ==
More recently, John Stubley has made use of the term as part of the Centre for Social Poetry. Stubley expands the idea to include what Owen Barfield describes as poetic “effect” – which distinguishes between the poetic form of words on a piece of paper, and the poetic effect of a “felt change of consciousness”. Stubley explores this poetic effect or experience as it occurs between human beings (socio-poetic experience), together with all that they can turn their minds and hands to in relation to the organisation (i.e., "poeticisation") of social life. He attempts to create spaces that give expression to imaginations of objective realities at work within the human and social organisms, thereby opening up the way to individual and social transformation.
