= Mihai Stelescu =

Romanian politician (1907–1936)

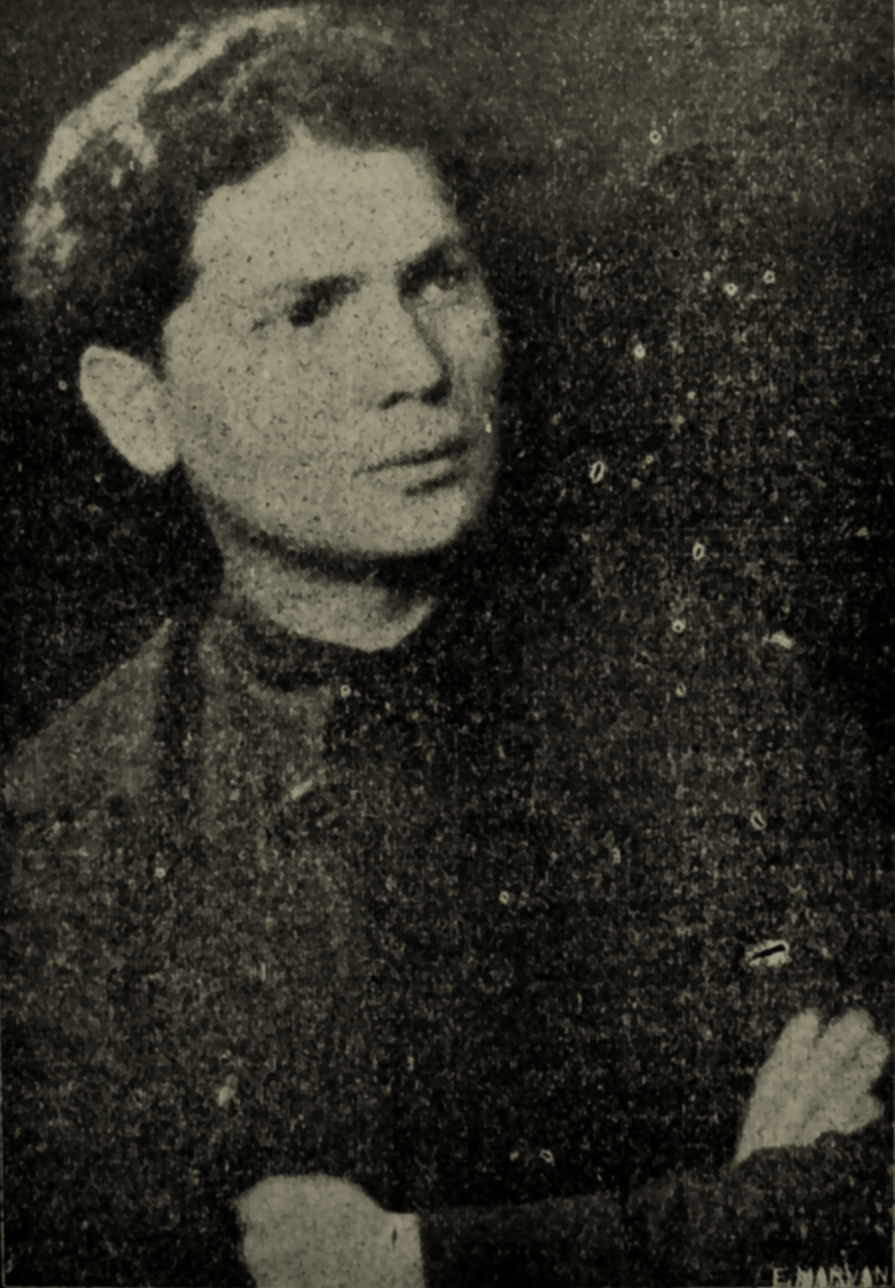
Photo of Mihail Stelescu dated to January 1936

Mihai Stelescu (1907 – July 16, 1936) was a Romanian political activist. He founded the Crusade of Romanianism, a breakaway faction of the Iron Guard.

== Biography ==
=== With the Iron Guard ===
Born in Galați, he joined, while still in high school, the Legion of the Archangel Michael (later also known as the Iron Guard), an ultra-nationalist, Fascist, and antisemitic political movement led by Corneliu Zelea Codreanu.

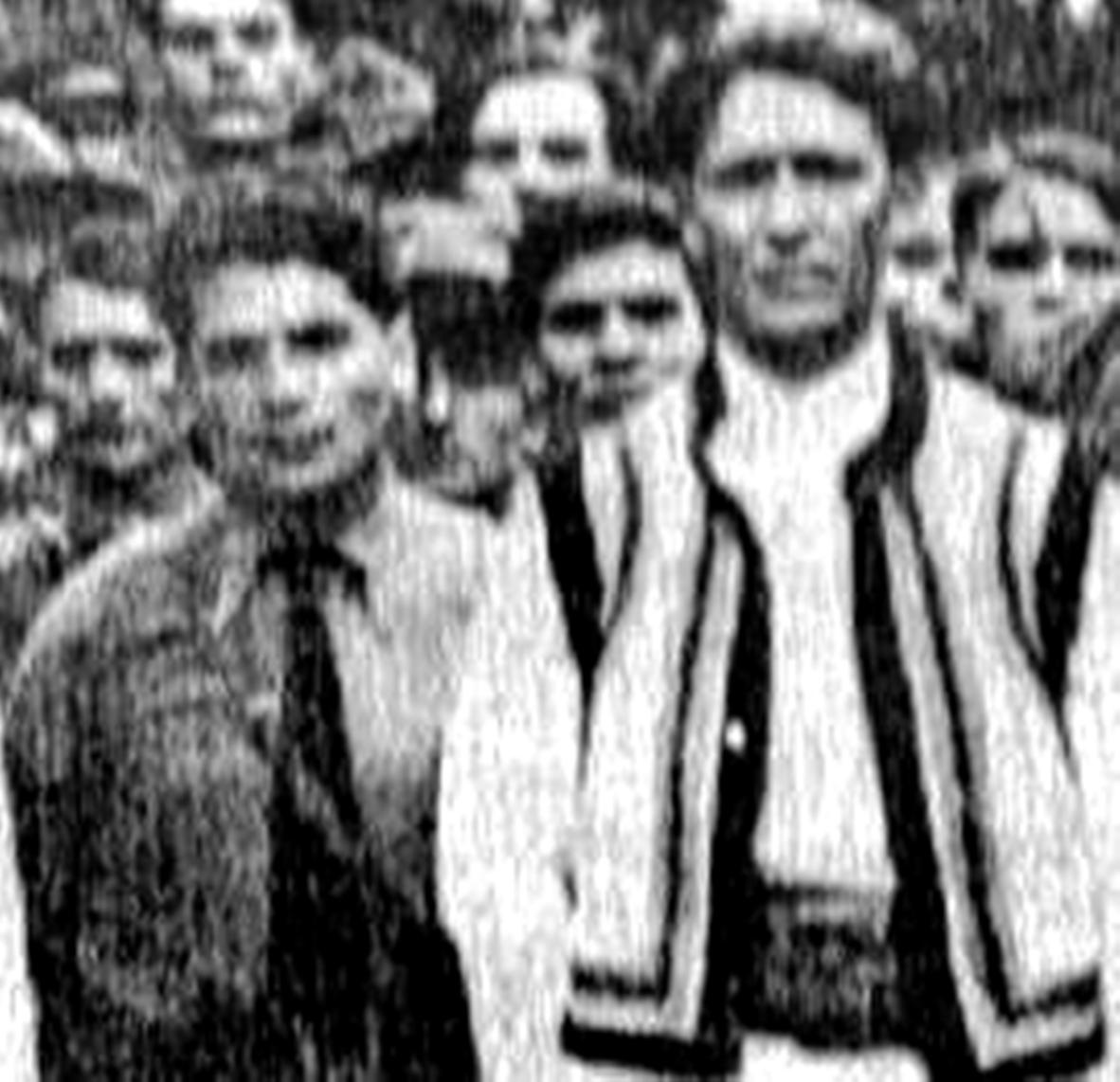
Stelescu (front row, left) with Codreanu by his side during an Iron Guard rally in 1933.

A prominent activist in his native Covurlui County, jailed more than once for his activism, he was awarded the White Cross (Crucea Albă), the movement's highest distinction, and eventually became Codreanu's lieutenant. In 1932, he was one of five members of the Legion to be elected to Parliament on the lists of the Corneliu Codreanu Grouping; he was also the youngest member of the Parliament at the time. Stelescu, together with Codreanu, General Gheorghe Cantacuzino-Grănicerul, Nichifor Crainic, and others, was tried for criminal conspiracy following the assassination of Prime Minister Ion G. Duca — all were acquitted by a jury comprising Legion sympathisers.

In September 1934, for mysterious reasons, Stelescu was investigated by a party jury under the leadership of Cantacuzino-Grănicerul; expelled, he is thought to have broken away from the Legion before the actual verdict. As a consequence, in 1935, he created his own political movement, originally called the White Eagles (Vulturii Albi), but later known as the Crusade of Romanianism (Cruciada Românismului), and began publishing a weekly magazine of the same name, in which he fiercely attacked Codreanu and the Legion.

=== Dissidence and controversy ===
There are conflicting accounts of what caused Stelescu's dissidence. According to the Legion's version (published much later by Codreanu's successor, Horia Sima) Stelescu was motivated by envy of Codreanu, and had even plotted to assassinate him; moreover, through his wife's relatives, he had made contact with political operators close to King Carol II, who, as the foremost opponent of the Legion, encouraged and supported his action. Other sources have alleged that Stelescu had even been an agent of Siguranța Statului, a hypothesis relying on a statement of the writer Panait Istrati, who was a sympathiser of Cruciada Românismului; he reportedly told the writer Alexandru Talex that Stelescu was "the man of those who keep me under surveillance" (a likely reference to Romanian authorities, suspicious of Istrati's earlier communist activism).

However, the Legionnaires bitterly hated Stelescu as an apostate, and that the details of the plot to assassinate Codreanu are hardly credible; at that time, the King would probably have supported anything that promised to reduce the Legion's growth and influence.

The dissidence may have been precipitated by the fact that Codreanu had assigned Cantacuzino-Grănicerul, rather than Stelescu, to lead the Legion's legal front, the All for the Fatherland Party (Partidul Totul pentru Țară), the political expression of the Legion at the time. It is, however, more likely that Stelescu's motivations were primarily political: Stelescu, together with the more radical sections of the Guard, was arguably disenchanted with Codreanu's attempt focus on attempts to obtain legal power.

At the same time, there is evidence that Stelescu questioned Codreanu's unconditional support for Nazi Germany (to which he preferred Italian fascism). According to Grigore Traian Pop, who cites another piece of writing by Stelescu, this was not the case, Stelescu having become an adversary of both Nazism and Italian fascism.

Stelescu also attacked the Guard's leader for maintaining secret contacts with the authorities and receiving bribes and subsidies, claiming that, in 1935, during the repression of the Guard, the leader had taken refuge in the residence of a female relative of Elena Lupescu, the King's mistress — "While everybody was staying in Jilava, and in other prisons, you were being sheltered by a lady. She was a person adverse to your action. How did you get along so well?". He also challenged Codreanu's public image by suggesting that the Guard's leader was in reality a bon viveur, as well as uncultured and a plagiarist. On one occasion, he defied Codreanu's violent methods, writing an open letter stating: "[If I am to be killed,] I ask for one indulgence, let the 'Chief' in person come [and do it], and, if possible, not in the back".

=== Crusade of Romanianism ===
The Crusade of Romanianism was a nationalist and eclectic organisation, presenting a more leftist and social colouring (its political programme included such items as decent wages, a mandatory 8-hour work day, and pensions for invalid workers) than other right-wing organisations of that time. Stelescu's dissidence may be compared to those of Otto Strasser or Manuel Hedilla. According to Talex, Stelescu had the will to make a party. Istrati probably contributed to balancing the ideologies in the Crusade's discourse.

Stelescu received support from a small number of well-known personalities (the Romanian Army officer Nicolae Rădescu, alongside Talex and Istrati), but few Legionnaires joined him. The dissidence's overall impact on the movement was minor, although the Legion did later adopt some of the social aspects of Stelescu's programme. Faced with lack of appeal, the group adhered to the Constitutional Front, a nationalist electoral alliance formed around the National Liberal Party-Brătianu and Alexandru Averescu's People's Party (it also included for some time the short-lived Citizen Bloc, presided by Grigore Forțu).

=== Death ===
In 1936, Stelescu was admitted to the Spitalul Brâncovenesc, a Bucharest hospital, for an appendectomy. While recovering, he was found by the Decemviri (the "Ten Men"), an Iron Guard death squad led by Ion Caratănase and probably created in 1935 in Târgu Mureș (during a youth congress tolerated by the Gheorghe Tătărescu executive).

According to the Legion's version, the assassins riddled his body with some 200 bullets, after which they left the hospital unmolested and surrendered voluntarily to the police. The alternative version claims that the assassins fired some 120 bullets (other sources point a number as low as 38), after which they attacked the cadaver with hatchets or axes, and danced around it until the police arrived. The rumors, disseminated right after the murder, that members of the death squad had engaged in acts of cannibalism, are unfounded.

All ten members of the Decemviri were immediately arrested. They were each found guilty of murder and sentenced to life in prison with hard labour. While officially both Codreanu and the Decemviri claimed that action had taken place without Codreanu's knowledge or consent, the probability remains highly unlikely; furthermore, Codreanu personally awarded each one of them the White Cross while they were kept in prison.

On November 30, 1938, all 10 members of the Decemviri, along with the Nicadori death squad and Codreanu, were killed during a purge of the Iron Guard ordered by King Carol II. The men were strangled to death while being transported to Jilava Prison. Their bodies were dissolved in acid, and placed under seven tons of concrete.
