= Radu Gyr =

Romanian writer (1905–1975)

- Born: Radu Ștefan Demetrescu; March 2, 1905; Câmpulung, Kingdom of Romania
- Died: April 29, 1975 (aged 70); Bucharest, Socialist Republic of Romania
- Resting place: Petru Vodă Monastery, Poiana Teiului, Neamț County
- Education: University of Bucharest
- Occupations: Poet, fascist activist
- Notable work: Arise Gheorghe, Arise Ioan!
- Political party: Iron Guard
- Spouse: Flora Gyr
- Children: 1
- Father: Ștefan Dumitrescu

Radu Gyr (Romanian pronunciation: [ˈradu ˈd͡ʒir]; pen name of Radu Ștefan Demetrescu [ˈradu ʃteˈfan demeˈtresku]; March 2, 1905 – 29 April 1975) was a Romanian poet, essayist, playwright, journalist, and fascist activist.

== Biography ==
=== Early life ===
Born in Câmpulung-Muscel, Gyr was the son of actor Ștefan "Coco" Dumitrescu. When he was 3, his family moved to Craiova, where he did his secondary studies at the Carol I High School. Starting in 1924, he studied at the Faculty of Letters and Philosophy of the University of Bucharest, where he received his Ph.D. in Literature and became a Senior Lecturer. He made his literary debut in 1924 with the well-received volume Liniști de schituri ("Silence of the sketes"), and continued with Cerbul de lumină (1928), Cununi uscate (1938), Poeme de război (1942), and Balade (1943). In 1927 he married Flora, with whom he had a daughter, Simona Luminița.

=== Iron Guard membership ===
In the 1930s he published in right-wing, nationalist literary magazines such as Gândirea, Gând Românesc, Sfarmă-Piatră, Decembrie, Vremea, Revista Mea, and Revista Dobrogeană, and in the newspapers Cuvântul, Buna Vestire, and Cuvântul Studențesc. He joined the Iron Guard fascist movement, becoming in time its commander in the Oltenia region. When the Iron Guard was repressed by the regime of King Carol II, Gyr was arrested and imprisoned at Tismana.

After the National Legionary Government came to power in September 1940, he was appointed General Manager of the Romanian Theatres. Under his administration, the Barașeum Jewish Theater (later State Jewish Theater) was founded. The creation of the Jewish Theatre was accompanied by an interdiction against Jewish actors playing anywhere else in Romania, part of a joint effort to purge Jewish people from "Romanian" (non-Jewish) theatres across the country.

=== In prison ===
Gyr was imprisoned for 20 years and he was never completely rehabilitated as a writer. In January 1941, after the Legionnaires' rebellion was put down by the Ion Antonescu regime, he was sentenced to 12 years in prison, for inciting the crowd. His first years as a political prisoner began as soon as the Iron Guard lost their battle with Antonescu. After spending time at Aiud Prison, Gyr was sent to fight on the Eastern Front (a form of punishment which was reserved for former Legionnaires) and was gravely wounded at the battle of Vinogradov. After the 1944 Romanian coup d'état he was re-arrested, and condemned to 12 years of hard labor for "contribution to the country's disaster". Sent back to Aiud, he was later transferred to Brașov Prison.

In 1959 he was sentenced to death by the Communist authorities because of his poem, considered subversive by the regime, "Ridică-te Gheorghe, ridică-te Ioane!" ("Arise Gheorghe, Arise Ioan!"). The poem called — in the style of a rally to war — the 'Romanian nation', symbolized by generic Romanian Christian names, to revolt. It had been issued as the last wave of brutal collectivization was taking hold of rural Romania (a process which lasted between 1949 and 1962).

An English translation of the poem:

Not for a heaped shovel of ruddy hot bread,
nor for barns full of grain, nor for fields full of corn,
instead for your heavens to be free of dread
rise up now Gheorghe, rise up now Ion!

For the blood of your folk flowing red through the drains,
for your beautiful song which was stifled at morn,
for the tears of your sun, left imprisoned in chains,
rise up now Gheorghe, rise up now Ion!

Not so that your fury sinks teeth into bars,
but to sing as you fill, on the crest of the dawn,
a heap of horizons and a hatful of stars,
rise up now Gheorghe, rise up now Ion!

So that freedom you drink, flowing fresh from the pail,
and to heavenly whirlpools be mightily drawn,
while apricot buds shake on you, merry hail,
rise up now Gheorghe, rise up now Ion!

And so, as you kindle your kisses on fires,
on thresholds, on doors, and on icons forlorn,
on all that is free, and to freedom aspires,
rise up now Gheorghe, rise up now Ion!

Rise up now Gheorghe on chains and on ropes!
Rise up now Ion on flesh and on bone!
And high, to the storm-light which shines on your hopes,
rise up now Gheorghe, rise up now Ion!

(From Romanian Poetry from its Origins to the Present, Daniel Ioniță, Australian-Romanian Academy Publishing, Sydney, 2020)

Gyr was sent to Jilava Prison to wait for the ultimate penalty. He appealed the sentence, which was commuted to life imprisonment. He served only six years, two of which (at Aiud Prison) with chains at his feet. Although severely ill (hepatitis, tuberculosis, haemophilia, gangrened rectal prolapse), he was refused any medical assistance, was starved and tortured. Altogether he served 16 years in communist prisons (1945–1956; 1958–1964). In 1963–1964 all surviving political prisoners had to be released, upon pressure from the West.

=== Collaboration with the Securitate ===
After his release from prison in 1964 he was constantly tailed by the Romanian secret police, the Securitate. Persuaded to use their perceived expertise in ethnocracy, Radu Gyr and Nichifor Crainic wrote propaganda articles for Glasul Patriei ('The Voice of the Fatherland') – later called Tribuna României – a newspaper published by the Securitate targeting exiled Romanians abroad.

=== Death and legacy ===
Gyr died in 1975 in Bucharest, and was buried in the city's Bellu Cemetery. In 2012, his remains and those of his wife (who died in 1984) were moved to Petru Vodă Monastery, in Poiana Teiului, Neamț County.

In 2010, a street in the Mănăștur district of Cluj-Napoca is named after him. In 2022, the USR party requested that the name of Radu Gyr Street be changed to Queen Helen Street. In 2025, the Elie Wiesel National Institute for Studying the Holocaust in Romania renewed the request for a name change.

== Published works ==
- Plânge Strâmbă-Lemne [The Wood Bender Crieth]. Flamura. 1927. OCLC 1483879258.
- Cerbul de lumină [A Deer of Light]. București: Editura Literară a Casei Școalelor. 1928. OCLC 1407749862.
- Stele pentru leagăn [Stars for the Cradle]. Râmnicul Vâlcea: Tipografia Episcopul Vartolomeiu. 1936. OCLC 491467724.
- Cununi uscate [Dried-up Wreaths]. 1938.
- Corabia cu tufănici [The Ship of Chrysanthemums]. 1939.
- Poeme de război [War Poems]. 1942.
- Balade [Ballads]. 1943. As well as a series of lyricised tales.

== Presence in English-language anthologies ==
- 2019 - Testament - 400 Years of Romanian Poetry / 400 de ani de poezie românească - Minerva Publishing 2019 - Daniel Ioniță (editor and principal translator) assisted by Daniel Reynaud, Adriana Paul, and Eva Foster. ISBN 978-973-21-1070-6
- 2020 - Romanian Poetry from its Origins to the Present - bilingual edition - Daniel Ioniță (editor and principal translator) with Daniel Reynaud, Adriana Paul and Eva Foster - Australian-Romanian Academy Publishing - 2020 - ISBN 978-0-9953502-8-1; LCCN - 2020907831
