= Alexandru Talex =

Romanian writer and political figure (1909–1998)

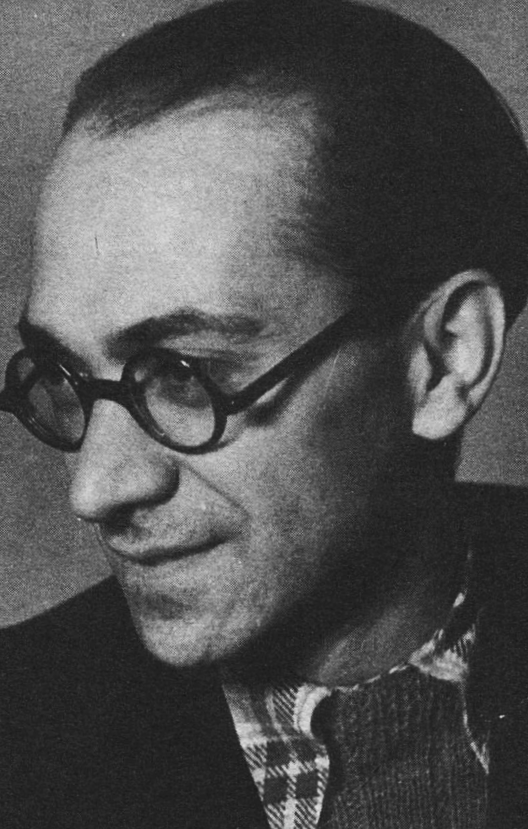
- Talex in 1940
- Born: Atanase Alexandrescu; 7 December 1909; Bucharest, Kingdom of Romania
- Died: 17 November 1998 (aged 88); Bucharest, Romania
- Occupations: Journalist; editor; translator; politician; trade unionist
- Writing career
- Period: 1931–1998
- Genres: Essay; biography; reportage
- Literary movement: Modernism

Alexandru Talex, born Atanase Alexandrescu (first name also Al., Alex., or Alexandre; 7 December 1909 – 17 November 1998), was a Romanian activist journalist, cultural promoter, translator, and literary historian, noted in particular for being the friend and apologist of novelist Panait Istrati. He debuted as a newspaperman while in his twenties, when he became a posthumous disciple of historian and Romanian nationalist thinker Vasile Pârvan, defending his thought against the dismissive opinions expressed by Eugen Lovinescu. As a friend of Mihai Stelescu, Talex was associated with Stelescu's proletarian-fascist group, the Crusade of Romanianism. He edited the movement's newspaper for two years, obtaining Istrati's collaboration and intellectual support; they were good friends for the final five months of Istrati's life, with Talex emerging as his custodian. He also established a lifelong relationship with Istrati's widow, Margareta, providing her with material support.

In early 1936, Talex oversaw the standoff between the Crusade and the more powerful Iron Guard, but recommended a non-violent approach. Stelescu was murdered by an Iron Guard death squad in July of that year, and the movement began disintegrating; Talex himself quit in September, immediately after having published an article supporting non-Soviet communism. Though affiliated for a while with the state party, called National Renaissance Front, and joining the Union of Professional Journalists as a contributor to various periodicals, he focused mainly on his preservation of Istrati's legacy. In 1944, with Romania was engaged on the Eastern Front, Talex published his biography of Istrati, emphasizing his late friend's anti-Sovietism. In tandem, he was drawn into the anti-Nazi resistance network, joining the editorial staff of România Liberă—an underground paper connected to the Romanian Communist Party. Following the 23 August Coup and its momentary restoration of democracy, he was active within the Romanian Social Democratic Party, supporting its alliance with the communists.

The Romanian communist regime tolerated Talex, and allowed him to continue working as a journalist, though its censorship apparatus banned his Istrati biography. In the 1960s, as Romania entered a national-communist phase, Istrati came to be reevaluated as an important writer and thinker. This effort was taken up by Alexandru Oprea and Eugen Barbu, albeit on terms that Talex found unacceptable. His publicized critique led to his own rediscovery as an Istrati expert, and he was directly involved in the publication of Istrati books, from reprints of his novels to collections of his letters. Talex also participated in a similar effort undertaken in France by Roger Grenier, and became an internationally recognized figure. He lived to see the Romanian Revolution of 1989, which allowed him to publish previously censored works by Istrati. By the time of his death in 1998, he was being criticized for his monopoly on Istrati's public image—including his attempt to block discussion about Istrati's, and his own, connections to fascism—and for the poor quality of his translations from French.

== Biography ==
=== Early life ===
Talex was born Atanase Alexandrescu in Bucharest, capital of the Romanian Kingdom, on 7 December 1909; he had a brother and a sister. According to his own testimony, he attended Mihai Viteazul College, where his teacher of Latin was the cultural critic Eugen Lovinescu. He entered literary life shortly after enlisting at the University of Bucharest Faculty of Letters—his first works were "critical notes" in the student journal Licăriri (February 1931). Talex was colleagues with novelist Pericle Martinescu, with whom he attended the bohemian cafés on Calea Victoriei. They worked together on Petre Bănescu's weekly newspaper, Timpul Nostru, where Alexandrescu took over as editorial secretary. Alexandrescu followed up with numerous articles in the press, including in publications such as Azi, Adevărul, Dimineața and Vremea, and was in attendance at Lovinescu's literary salon, Sburătorul. He embraced modernism and, in December 1931, introduced the avant-garde poet Sașa Pană with a lecture at the Institute of Literature. His speaking style was allegedly viewed as incomprehensible by those in the audience, and he was asked to step down.

For a while in 1931–1932, Alexandrescu was featured alongside Lovinescu in Cristalul magazine, put out in Pitești by Mihail Ilovici. His object of admiration was the historian and political thinker Vasile Pârvan (1882–1927), on whom he wrote his graduation thesis. He was impressed with Pârvan's personality, and worked in particular to familiarize the public with Pârvan's anti-Russian stances, which he himself took to be morally and historically justified. He was therefore outraged in 1930, when Lovinescu attacked Pârvan, and in particular by the attack's harshness. Aspiring to be recognized as a literary expert, Alexandrescu earned the confidence of Pârvan's sister, Elvira Apăteanu, who allowed him to take possession of her brother's surviving letters. Talex claims that he then let the literary historian George Călinescu borrow these; he was enraged when Călinescu presented the documents as his own finds, and tried to engage him in a public polemic. Assisted by Vremea's editorial secretary, Alexandru Sahia, he published his own version of the letters in that newspaper. It was also Sahia who came up with the pseudonym "Talex", which Alexandrescu used ever since.

As a university student, Alexandrescu-Talex met and befriended colleagues Mihai Stelescu and Doru Belimace, both of whom were active within the revolutionary fascist Iron Guard. According to Talex's own recollections, this made it hard for them to remain friends—though he himself was a "know-nothing" in political matters, he had a "vague" preference for democracy, which he saw as a marriage of "liberty and social justice", and had been impressed by Julien Benda's anti-authoritarianism. In 1936, he reported his ongoing fascination with Stelescu:

I was struck by the charming and humane power of his eyes. And I was most of all taken aback by the warm tone of his voice, which was sometimes soft as a whisper, and then gusty and strong, like thunders. [...] When I had withdrawn into a library, hating the world outside, Mihail [sic] Stelescu dragged me out, so that he and I could taste the beauty that is found in battling others, in battling life, in battling oneself.

Talex recalls breaking off any connection with Belimace when the latter joined an Iron Guard death squad, assassinating Prime Minister Ion G. Duca. He was soon attracted into a collaboration with the Crusade of Romanianism (the Crusaders), founded by Stelescu in opposition to the Guard. As recounted by literary historian Grigore Traian Pop, Talex once explained that Stelescu had been equally enthusiastic about Nazism and Trotskyism, but that he eventually abandoned his support for the former after an unexplained incident. In another of his recollections, Talex notes that his own reconciliation with Stelescu occurred shortly after Stelescu had left the Guard and been denounced as its "traitor"; he informed Stelescu that this meant "you have regained your human nature." Though literary historian Teodor Vârgolici records Alexandrescu's graduation date as 1935, he himself recalled that he had already taken his diploma in 1934, and had remained unemployed. Lodging in the working-class neighborhood of Lemaître (outside the Bucharest Abattoir), he made ends meet by tutoring children, and received some additional help from his parents.

=== At Cruciada Românismului ===
Talex was editor-in-chief of the Crusade's eponymous newspaper (Cruciada Românismului) between 1934 and 1936. The publication, and the group surrounding it, were probably sponsored by the King of Romania, Carol II, who wanted to undermine the Iron Guard's popularity, as well as being more transparently provided for by landowner Constantin A. Caradja. As noted by various commentators, the Stelist movement was largely mimetic of the Guard, though it was more left-wing, or "Social Fascist", drawing comparisons to Strasserism. Talex himself defined "Romanianism" as a "new doctrine", invented by Stelescu, but inspired by Pârvan, and further beyond by Bogdan Petriceicu Hasdeu and Mihai Eminescu (he also cited Constantin Rădulescu-Motru as a reference). It was "a social movement, formed over a spiritual, socialized, doctrinaire combat, that would result in a new covenant for the Romanian people." In retrospect, he regarded his contribution as only on the "spiritual side", noting that Stelescu was tasked with the political messaging—and that this latter type of messaging primarily consisted of exposing the Guard's immorality.

It was also at this stage that Talex met Istrati, on 6 December 1934. The latter, having once been a communist, sparked an international controversy after publishing the negative impressions of his trip to the Soviet Union in 1927. As a result of this embarrassment, the Comintern and the State Political Directorate had joined up in an international effort to destroy Istrati's reputation. This encounter came immediately after Talex had chronicled Istrati's novel, Le bureau de placement, in Cruciada's first issue. According to Talex's own account in old age, Istrati had enjoyed reading Cruciada, and wanted to meet its authors. He and the ailing novelist, who would die soon after, became good friends. In his final months, Istrati was a Cruciada contributor, in terms that he negotiated as "absolute freedom of expression". In one of his articles there, he recorded his thoughts upon meeting Stelescu and Talex, congratulating the former for having done away with the Iron Guard's "rotting cadaver". In January 1935, Cruciada hosted a debate between Istrati and Stelescu, on the issue of antisemitism—abhorred by Istrati, but still upheld by Stelescu. Talex also intervened, with a successful attempt at calming both men; in his article, he reassured Istrati that "our antisemitism" was indeed "combative", but also that it was "humane". Under his tenure, Cruciada regularly featured quotes from Pârvan, seen as an authority on cultural matters, and also as someone who had prophesied Istrati's arrival. Talex took long walks around Lemaître and along the Dâmbovița with his senior friend, and recalls talking to him about Pârvan. He now turned fully against Lovinescu, describing him as a "con artist" in one of his articles for Cruciada (March 1935).

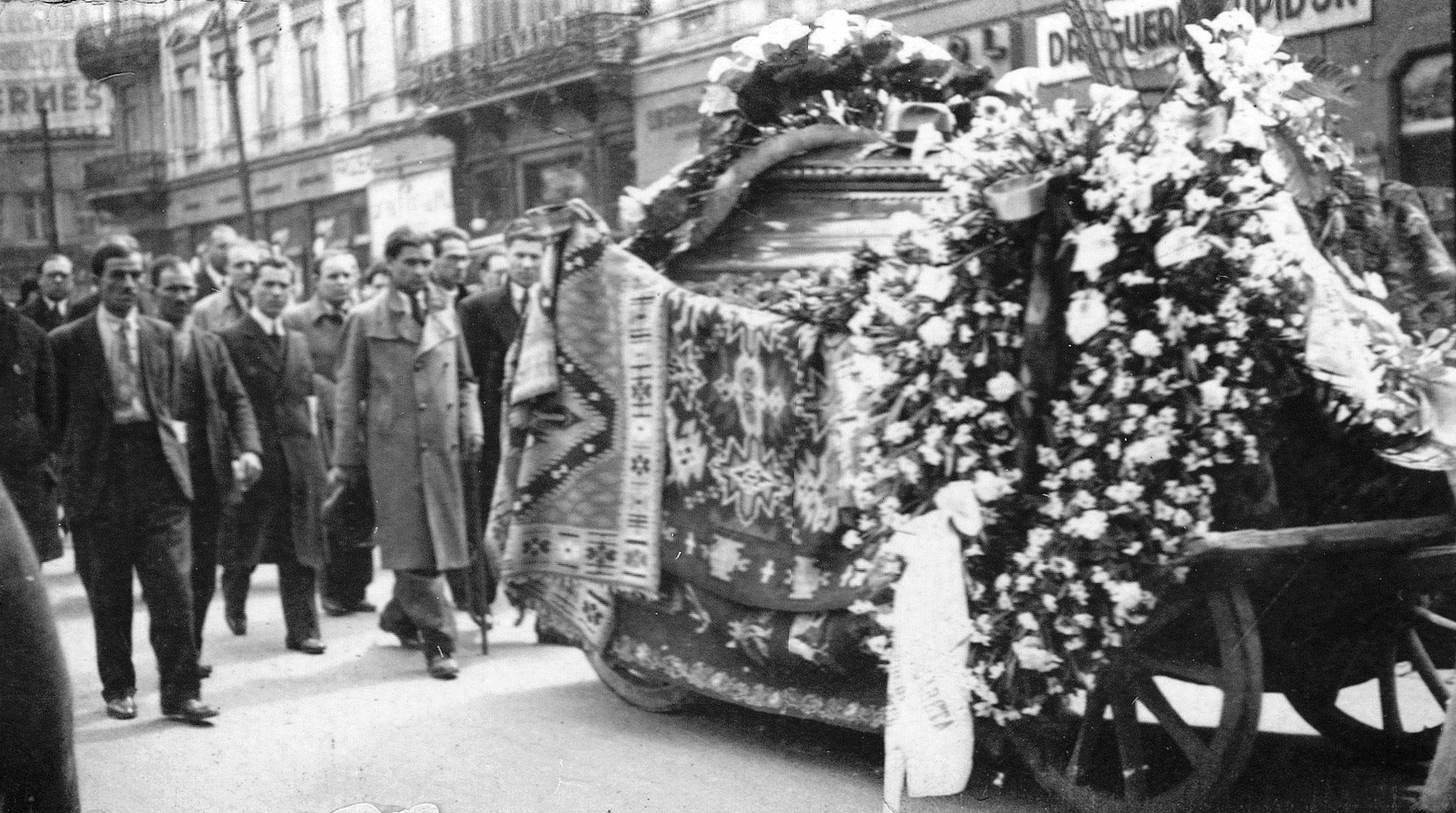
Mihai Stelescu, Talex, and other Crusade members at Panait Istrati's funeral, April 1935

At a time when both Stelescu and Istrati were dead, Talex claimed that the three of them had formed a blood-brotherhood pact. In his encounters with Pop, he reportedly gave a more reserved account, noting that Istrati had viewed Stelescu with suspicion, as a likely agent of the Siguranța secret police, send to spy in on him. During one of their daily encounters, Istrati has asked Talex to move in with him and maintain his personal archive. Talex hesitated long enough for Istrati's tuberculosis to evolve to critical, then terminal, stages. They continued to meet each during the novelist's final months, when Istrati whimsically asked him to run away with him in the woods—as Talex recalls, this was a joke aimed at those who had called Istrati a closeted homosexual. Shortly after his friend's death, Talex took the controversial decision of translating and publishing in Cruciada a French-language article that he had recovered from Istrati's papers. This was later featured in anthologies as Istrati's twelfth Cruciada contribution—seen by literary historian Mircea Iorgulescu as a purposeful misdirection of the public by Talex.

Istrati was survived by his young wife, the beauty queen Margareta Curelea-Istrati, who joined Talex in preserving his literary estate and his legacy. On 19 May 1935, they were among the founders of the Friends of Panait Istrati Association, operating out of the Istrati home. Its managers included several public figures: Stelescu, Constantin Barcaroiu, Demostene Botez, Vladimir Cavarnali, Petru Manoliu, and Aida Vrioni. Talex followed up by translating Istrati's preface to his Maison Thüringer, and having it published in one of Cruciada's June issues. In doing so, he omitted fragments in which the author had detailed his thoughts on patriotism, as these contradicted Stelescu's ideology. He also assigned himself the task of curating Istrati's papers, editing his works, and explaining his perspective on society. As argued by Iorgulescu, this was originally a contribution to the Crusade's "possessive cult" of Istrati, used by the party as a political asset. In September, Cruciada hosted his thoughts on "proletarian literature", which he described as "neither communist nor fascist, [but] naturally human." The leftist team at Facla derided this claim, arguing that Talex was only seeking to dupe workers into recruitment by "Crusader fascism".

According to Vârgolici, Talex still had an "essential contribution toward informing the Romanian mind as to Panait Istrati's true image, both his own and that of his work. [...] Talex assigned himself a moral duty of perpetuating [Istrati's] message into posterity." The journalist also felt personally responsible for the safety of Istrati's young widow, who managed to beat her own tuberculosis infection. Talex's other early contributions to Istratian literature were his back-translations of various stories by Istrati, who had written most of his work in French. These were done under contract with Cartea Românească, and allowed Talex (who notes that "never in my life did I dream that I would be working as a translator") to provide for Margareta. During mid-1935, Talex, Margareta and a team of Crusaders showed up in Baldovinești, where Istrati's mother Joița was buried. They attempted to exhume the body for reburial in Bucharest, but met stiff opposition from the locals, reportedly including Istrati's maternal uncle.

=== Leftward shift ===
In November 1935, both Stelescu and the Guard's leader, Corneliu Zelea Codreanu, were arrested by the Romanian state for their earlier activities together. This marked a showdown between the Guardists and the Crusaders, when both groups paraded through the Palace of Justice. Talex was organizing the Crusader squad, but backed out when it turned out that the Guard had a more menacing presence, which he attributed to government support; he then informed his adversaries that his party would never resort to violence. Days later, Talex was a speaker at the Crusader Congress, when he defined the movement as a "youthful reaction", inspired by Istrati, and called "Romanianism" a stand that reached beyond plain nationalism—tackling corruption and unifying the people. In May 1936, he was a guest writer for the first issue of Festival magazine, put out by Mircea Papadopol in Silistra. In it, he advised the Festival group to embrace "the new life" and contribute to "the spiritual healing of Romania's youth."

In July 1936, Stelescu was publicly murdered by another Guardist death squad, who caught up with him while he was recovering from surgery at Brâncovenesc Hospital. In the immediate aftermath, Cruciada published exaggerated or false claims about the assassination, including suggestions that it had included ritualistic cannibalism; according to Pop, these rumors were probably stoked by Talex with both unsigned and signed articles that were used as primary sources by other newspapers. Talex attended his mentor's funeral at Bellu cemetery, where he delivered an oration that called Stelescu a martyr, adding: "My beloved Crusaders, honor the judgment of your commander with holy devotion, and fight with a true heart for the Crusade of Romanianism, and against anarchy. Tell everyone that this hateful and cowardly crime not only made you more alive, but even more that it steeled you." At a non-scheduled meeting of the Crusader leadership, in July or early August 1936, Talex repeated his call for non-violence, adding: "We don't want to play into the hands of the government, which wants to get rid of the 'captains', those whom it was supporting just the other day, by inciting two camps against each other."

The assassination exposed factional splits among the Crusaders themselves. In September, Talex published a Cruciada article describing communism as a "flawless doctrine" and "mankind's only salvation for the future" (though he noted that the Soviet experiment was "red fascism", in line with Istrati's pronouncements). He eventually handed in his resignation from Cruciada on 6 September 1936, invoking "ideological disagreements" with the new party leadership; his walk-out was closely followed by thirteen other members, including Cavarnali and Cruciada's other editor, Paul Bărbulescu. In October, the Crusade's "leadership committee" published a "letter of clarification", which spoke of "three or four" members having been expelled as agents provocateurs, who had "sought to discredit the movement by presenting it as supportive of the communist credo." Talex's supporters included anarchist promoter Ion Ionescu-Căpățână, who had tried to contact him and Stelescu immediately after Istrati's death. Căpățână suggests that his ouster was engineered by the Iron Guard, which thus neutralized the Crusade. As seen by him, Talex was an easy target, "the weakest [Crusader], for being the gentlest", and was at the time also attacked by the Romanian Communist Party (PCR), who depicted him as a Trotskyist. In 2010, journalist Florian Bichir credited accounts which suggest that Talex was in reality a Siguranța informant, and that, in this capacity, "he put the choke on quite a few people" (i-a înfundat pe mulți).

Talex's own work as editor was first consecrated in 1936, when he put together the Istrati anthology Artele și umanitatea de azi ("Arts and the Current State of Humanity"). It comprised Istrati's last articles in Cruciada, as well as his own "thorough analytical and biographical overview" of his deceased friend. He followed up with a string of Istratian translations, producing Romanian versions of his essays and novels—from În lumea Mediteranei (1936) to Haiducii (1943). He took another public stand against the Iron Guard in April 1937, when, alongside Virgil Treboniu, Petre Bellu and Anghel Ghițulescu, he authored a letter of solidarity with the senior novelist, Mihail Sadoveanu, who had been threatened by the Guard for his political activities. The text celebrated Sadoveanu as a "civic writer" and as the embodiment of "our nation's vigor"; it called out Sadoveanu's enemies as "apologists of darkness and of hatred among men." In late 1938, all of Romania's parties were nominally replaced by a catch-all National Renaissance Front, under Carol II; in January 1939, it received the bloc adherence of Talex and other 19 former Crusade activists, credited as such by the official newspapers. By April of that year, he was a contributor to the weekly magazine Haz ("Fun"), alongside Mihail Sebastian, Paul Păun, and Eugen Relgis. The Iron Guard's Porunca Vremii made a note of this, listing the Jewish ethnicity of the former three, and calling out Talex as: "Romanian, but an imbecile".

=== World War II and democratic interlude ===
During the brief Guardist ascendancy, or National Legionary State (1940–1941), Margareta Istrati was reportedly harassed. In 1941–1943, at the height of World War II (which saw Romania's engagement on the Eastern Front against the Soviet Union), Talex was a staff writer at Acțiunea newspaper, also publishing a translation of Octave Aubry's historical novel, L'Impératrice Eugénie. By 1942, he had published his Romanian version of Istrati's Les Chardons du Baragan, with Editura Moderna company. In April 1943, Talex (credited as "Al. Theodorescu-Talex") also organized Istrati's eighth commemoration, at Bellu, during which he read from Istrati's political testament, as well as lyrics by Dimitrie Stelaru. The ceremony saw the participation of Vrioni, Bărbulescu, Marcel Bibiri Sturia, Ștefan Voitec, and Panait Mușoiu. In 1944, Talex produced his first book-sized biography of Istrati, noted for its through investigation of Istrati's final engagements, as a critic of communism and more specifically an anti-Soviet intellectual; though published with an imprint of Vremea, the book was criticized in that same newspaper by columnist George Ivașcu, who saw it as "pure idolatry". The book also downplayed Istrati's earlier support for Leninism, making only a brief mention of his original reasons for visiting the Soviet Union. Looking back on this contribution forty years later, Talex viewed his as an act of rebellion against Romania's Nazi-aligned dictator, Ion Antonescu. This is because the book included a dedication to those killed in the peasants' revolt of 1907, and also because, more generally, it defended human rights.

Talex was affiliated with Ion Vinea's Professional Journalists' Union (UZP), which at one point awarded him a substantial grant in recognition for his administrative work. In early August 1944, with Vinea absent from the country, he was pro-tempore chairman of the UZP, and also voted in as its treasurer. The 23 August Coup ended Antonescu's rule and Romania's Nazi alliance, opening the country to a Soviet occupation. This strike was partly engineered by an underground network comprising the PCR and its satellite organization, called Union of Patriots. According to a later report by communist George Macovescu, Talex was in contact with the PCR and its allies "even before [...] January 1943", and had agreed to join a "collective" that put out party propaganda—and that he was employed there alongside Ivașcu, Alecu Constantinescu, Stephan Roll, and Tereza Ungar. Another communist, Alexandru Graur, recounts that Talex was mainly involved as a contributor to the illegal newspaper, România Liberă (for which he was translating information picked up from Radio Londres). Graur's account is also partly validated by Ivașcu, according to whom Talex was present with one of the successive teams of România Liberă editors, back when the newspaper was still published at a secret location.

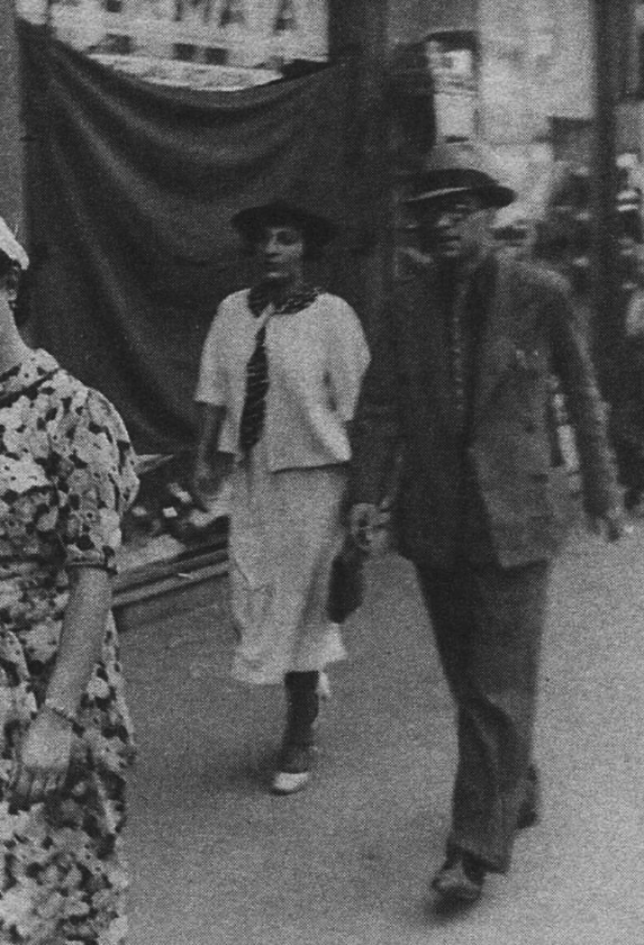
Candid shot of Talex and Margareta Istrati, taken in Bucharest in 1946

During the UZP revamp in November 1944, Talex was officially included on a list of founding members, alongside figures such as Constantinescu, Graur, Ivașcu, Macovescu, Roll, Radu Boureanu, Scarlat Callimachi, N. D. Cocea, Eugen Jebeleanu, Ion Pas, Grigore Preoteasa, Cicerone Theodorescu, Șerban Voinea, and Ilie Zaharia. His first job after the coup was at Tudor Teodorescu-Braniște's daily, Jurnalul de Dimineață, where he worked continuously between 1944 and 1947. In May 1945, he joined Cocea, L. Vaisermann-Mireanu, and Paul Daniel in establishing the newspaper Industrie și Comerț, owning stock to the amount of 100,000 lei. The announcement, published in Monitorul Oficial, gave his address as Strada Fetițelor 4. By June, he had joined the Romanian Social Democratic Party (PSDR), participating on its Socialist Group for Art and Culture. Three months later, he represented the party in Băneasa, at a meeting of the communist-steered National Democratic Front, where he voiced its continued support for the Groza Cabinet. In November, he lectured at Gioconda Theater about the significance of the October Revolution.

Alongside Ștefan Baciu and Ștefan Tita, Talex served on the PSDR press bureau during the national party conference of December 1945. Also in 1945, Talex translated Jean Jaurès' speech on "Art and Socialism". This was followed in 1946 by Dmitry Furmanov's romanticized biography of Vasily Chapayev, commissioned to him by Editura Cartea Rusă. In a contemporary review, Geo Dumitrescu found his rendition to be "thorough", but criticized his reliance on the Bucharest thieves' cant for rendering Russian colloquialisms. Talex's activity at Jurnalul saw him both championing left-wing causes and engaging in public disputes with the PCR. On October Revolution Day 1945, he gave a celebratory speech at Bucharest's Gioconda Theater. In March 1946, he signed up to a communist protest against Francoist Spain, demanding that it be isolated internationally after Cristino García's execution. A month later, communist Tudor Olaru hinted that Talex, noted as "that ex-ringleader of Cruciada Românismului", was friends with the PSDR's anti-communist leader, Constantin Titel Petrescu—and therefore hostile to the PCR as well.

Late in 1946, Talex and Teodorescu-Braniște had contributions to a debate on the "crisis of culture", centered on the notion that Romanians were no longer interested in art and literature. Talex expressed the belief that the phenomenon was in fact an economic crisis, since Romanians would rather spend their dwindling incomes on "potatoes, corn, [and] lard". He also acknowledged that there was a larger "spiritual crisis", brought on by the writers themselves (since they had forgotten to make their literature stand up for ideas), and noted in passing the growing, and "stifling", influence of political pressures on creators. The whole controversy was curbed by Tudor Arghezi in Adevărul, when he suggested that the only crisis was that of a "literary talking point" for the "few youths" in question. As read by political scientist Stelian Tănase, the debate itself was "hodgepodge, cobbled up, without an end game. Its merit was that of raising a plausible issue during a sterile period, a period of fanatical censorship. Nothing came of this exchange of ideas, but the gray and tense landscape was at least partly colored-in."

=== Communist censoring and recovery ===
This transitional interval was ended by the inauguration of a Romanian communist state. Talex's 1944 profile of Istrati was banned by communist censorship—during a period that Talex himself identified as Romania's Stalinism. Margareta also reports that some of her husband's letters were conficated by Barbu Lăzăreanu, on behalf of the communized Romanian Academy. Talex was still featured in România Liberă: in December 1949, it hosted his reportage on "the letters and gifts" sent by the miners and peasants of Jiu Valley to Joseph Stalin. As noted by literary scholar Angelo Mitchievici, Talex was "successfully recycled" by the PCR, which allowed him to gloss over his earlier engagements with the far-right. According to Bichir, he also successfully transitioned from the Siguranța to the communized police force, or Securitate, which had him as an informant; his subsequent work toward upholding Istrati's reputation may have therefore been his attempt "to find some sort of retribution for his own deeds, when faced with eternity." Such readings, and in particular Bichir's allegations, were spurned by Talex's disciple, Maria Cogălniceanu, who noted that Talex had never enjoyed any privileges afforded by the communist state, and had instead lived ascetically; she also points out that Talex did not contribute to official propaganda, and instead found his writings shelved by the censors.

By the 1960s, Talex had been allowed back as a professional editor, and employed as such by Viața Economică review. He personally intervened so that his old boss, Teodorescu-Braniște, be featured there as a contributor. In June 1963, communist leader Gheorghe Gheorghiu-Dej awarded Talex the Medal of Liberation from the Fascist Yoke, acknowledging his contribution at România Liberă. Talex had fathered a daughter, Corina "Nina", later married Costopol-Dima. Their neighbor and fellow writer, Maya Belciu, reports that the two of them shared an apartment with Margareta, at Calea Moșilor 131. The same was noted later by diarist Diana Dumitriu, who visited them and then commented, regarding Talex and Margareta: "Are they in a relationship? Who could ever know? In any case they poke fun at each other, with a sort of everyday intimacy but they also speak of Panait with the same, shared, admiration."

The regime was experiencing a national-communist turn, which also signaled Istrati's public rehabilitation; Talex was not a visible participant in the first installments of this process. This was observed by Monica Lovinescu, the self-exiled daughter of Talex's mentor and enemy, who had become a staff critic at Radio Free Europe. Lovinescu noted in 1970 that "Panait Istrati has been annexed by a sinister pair: Al[exandru] Oprea and Eugen Barbu", who were highlighting the compatibilities between Istrati and the new dogmas. If the more qualified Talex was skipped, it was because of his "capital defect, which is that he has been Panait Istrati's true friend." The two authors had proceeded to publish Istrati's novels, most of which were originally written in French, in new back-translations to Romanian, even though Istrati himself had penned Romanian versions. Talex himself had criticized Oprea and Barbu with an op-ed in Contemporanul of 15 January 1965, describing their approach as a form of "cosmetic surgery".

In 1970, Oprea allowed Talex's versions of Istratian articles to appear in the anthology Pentru a fi iubit pămîntul..., released by Editura Tineretului. They were briefly reviewed by Perpessicius, who called his an "elegant translation". Talex also began publishing selections from Istrati's correspondence—in mid-1972, Ramuri hosted his samples of such documents, in which Istrati spoke about his friend, Nikos Kazantzakis (and specifically about Kazantzakis' involvement in the population exchange between Greece and Turkey). In 1974, he was invited to attend Rotonda 13, an event which grouped senior authors who reminisced about literary life in the interwar; the topic was Istrati, celebrated on what would have been his 90th birthday. Literary critic Șerban Cioculescu reportedly introduced him as a "writer", but Talex objected, wanting to be only known as "only a journalist and perhaps a friend of Istrati's" (Talex's emphasis); in 1975, he admitted his "horror" toward the emerging group of "Istratologists", and informed Cogălniceanu that he had retired from public life. He was more intensely recognized as a leading authority by a younger Istrati scholar, Mugur Popovici, who came to visit him in his home, where he also met Margareta.

=== International recognition ===
Talex's public protest against Oprea and Barbu was eventually heard by the managers at Editura Minerva, who asked him to complete a list of all works that Istrati had ever rendered into Romanian, and agreed to publish these against Oprea and Barbu. His activity was being rediscovered in France, where a Friends of Panait Istrati society had been founded in Valence by Christian Golfetto and Marcel Mermoz. They first met with Talex in early 1971, when they visited him in Bucharest; he began contributing to their quarterly, Cahiers Panaït Istrati (later Les Amis de Panaït Istrati), from its first issue, of January 1976. From 1978, he began taking regular study trips abroad, living at Mermoz's homes in Paris and Valence. His contributions were being recognized by other French intellectuals—in particular by Roger Grenier, who was putting out the integral Istrati edition in French, and who described Talex as "a saint of that supreme devotion." Talex himself finally returned with an edition which put together Istrati's confessions regarding his beginnings in literature, Cum am devenit scriitor ("How I Became a Writer"), appearing at Craiova in 1981. It was, in his own words, specifically designed to "wash off the various ignominies that had been spewed [about Istrati]". He presented this volume to his old friend Pericle Martinescu, leaving the latter to note in his diary: "Talex has become entirely confounded with Istrati." Marinescu also mused about the paradoxes of Istrati's recovery:

While in Romania they still work on the Panait Istrati 'dossier', striving to make him into an unrelenting admirer of socialism (and of communism, even), in Paris [...] he is upheld as the vanguard of anti-socialism. Had the writer still been alive today to witness this spectacle, he'd openly curse all of those involved, and would call out this entire world as 'garbage'. Which it surely is!

Cum am devenit scriitor was followed by Talex's definitive versions of Istratian novels or novellas, this time as translated by Istrati himself: Chira Chiralina (1982), Viața lui Adrian Zograffi (1983), Neranțula (1984). Writing in September 1984, scholar Edgar Papu celebrated this project as a "great cultural and patriotic act", "a splendid restitution into our national patrimony." Iorgulescu acknowledges that the series has its relative merits, such as being the best one to have been produced under communism, but also pointed out that Talex's dilettantism got the best of him. The edition's notes had "somewhat mythomaniacal" statements that served to both preserve the Istrati "cult" and elevate Talex's own status. One such example was Talex's stretching of his friendship to the author, from four months (during which Istrati had been mostly "bedridden, cared for by his family") to a full two years. The two researchers had respected each other greatly: Iorgulescu found his senior colleague to have been a great help toward uncovering the unknown aspects of Istrati's life, while Talex discovered in Iorgulescu an intellectual willing to modernize Istrati's image; however, with time, Iorgulescu grew irritated by Talex's various transgressions and monopolistic tendencies.

Reestablishing the Friends of Panait Istrati club as an annex of Bucharest's Sadoveanu Public Library (December 1981), Talex was published in magazines such as România Literară and Manuscriptum. He and Margareta made several extended visits abroad—she was trying to recover her late husband's royalties. Sometimes they met with Belciu, who had settled abroad; as she recalled, one of these visits took them to Menton on the French Riviera, as guests of Istrati's friend Jean Stanesco. In 1984, at Éditions Gallimard, Talex published Le pèlerin du cœur ("A Heart's Pilgrim"), grouping together Istrati's more obscure, or never-before published, articles and essays. The following year, he contributed a Romanian volume of Istrati's memoirs, which he had translated from the French and accompanied with his own "lavish notes and commentaries." As Iorgulescu indicates, this work included some of Istrati's explicit connections to far-right ideologies, though with Talex's editorializing, which called Cruciada a "magazine of very young folks" and depicted Stelescu as exclusively a victim of the Guardists. Further, Talex's translation of an Istratian letter to L'Humanité was "inordinately inaccurate" (exagerat de infidelă); in 1985, when Talex published in Caiete Critice the complete letters exchanges between Istrati and Romain Rolland, he reportedly agreed to have his translations corrected by Iorgulescu. The book had been in preparation for almost a decade, its publication by Cartea Românească first delayed by the death of editor Mihai Gafița in the earthquake of March 1977, and later blocked by censorship. According to the French philologist Jean-Pierre Longre, the end result was "edulcorated".

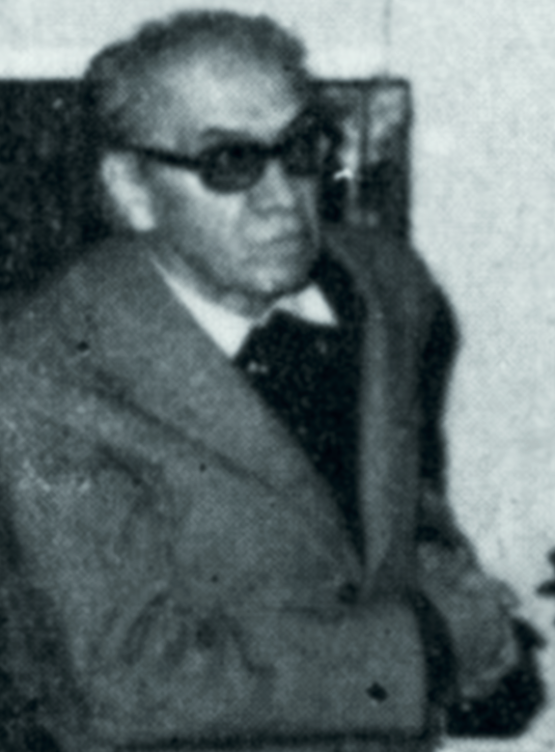
Talex at a Museum of Romanian Literature conference, October 1984

Talex visited West Germany in 1985, attending Frankfurt Book Fair as a guest of the trade unions' publishing house, Büchergilde Gutenberg. During his trips to France, in early 1986 and again in 1988, he visited Lovinescu Jr. She found him to be "honest as always", but a "maniacal" bore—since he turned all conversation back to Istrati. She acknowledged this tenacity too, since it was thanks to it that "Istrati's 'rehabilitation' never turned into that farce that was being conceived of—and partly set in motion—by Oprea and E. Barbu." Iorgulescu and Talex still supported each other on another issue of biographical research, upon reaching similar conclusions regarding Istrati's disputed paternity. In 1987, they both questioned Oprea's theory, which had Istrati as the son of Gherasim Valsamos; their own views were challenged by Nicolae Georgescu in Luceafărul, and then by Barbu's Săptămîna, both of which suggested that Talex was Iorgulescu's "spiritual mentor". Lovinescu, who kept up with the Romanian literary press, believed that both magazines were serving Barbu's personal agenda, which was to discredit Talex and then have his Istratian translations published and sold as the accepted standard.

Around that time, Iorgulescu and Talex traveled to Greece, where they attended a literary festival honoring Istrati. Lovinescu, who heard the details from Iorgulescu himself, wrote off the event as having a "socialist-folkloric level", as befitting commands received from Bucharest. A regular in the international Cahiers Panaït Istrati, where he published an "extremely valuable" record of the Istrati–Rolland correspondence, Talex also reviewed for print the complete exchanges of letters between Istrati and other cultural figures (such as Georg Brandes, Jean Guéhenno, Josué Jéhouda and Marcel Martinet). These were issued as a single volume in 1988. Iorgulescu was critical of this effort as well, since, for all of Talex's "devotion and fidelity", the notes he produced were at least partly "superficial, negligent, or downright aberrant." Belciu reports that Talex was sought after by many people who were either connected with Istrati or maintained a cult of the latter. Examples of the former included a daughter of "Old Man Dumitru", who had been portrayed in Istratian prose, while one of the latter category was a French bricklayer who simply wanted to know what it was like to have looked into Istrati's eyes.

=== Final decade ===
Nina Talex was a poet affiliated with the Comentar literary club, and had some of her works published as part of the 1977 edition of the nationwide communist festival, Cîntarea României. Alexandru and Margareta remained privately opposed to the regime, and allowed Popovici to read up on their collection of anti-communist literature—comprising authors such as Eugène Ionesco, Artur London, Nadezhda Mandelstam, and Jean-François Revel. As noted by Lovinescu, by 1988 he had remained genuinely opposed to capitalism and democracy, borrowing his outlook on this issue from Istrati ("poor Talex has Panait Istrati's anathemas against capitalism still stuck in his head"). At the international congresses he attended, Talex networked with anti-communist readers, and used his connections to his advantage. At one such encounter in March 1989, speakers such as Heinrich Stiehler opened up the neglected topic of Crusader fascism; as noted by Iorgulescu, Talex and Ion Stănică were among those who shut down the debate, by arguing that Stelescu had been labeled as such in communist propaganda and historiography, and therefore that the claim was untrue. The same researcher described this stand as self-contradictory, since Talex had been allowed to republish at least part of the Cruciada articles by the same regime he claimed was maligning Cruciada as fascist.

Talex lived to see the Romanian Revolution, which toppled communism in December 1989. Popovici was able to record his first and only interview with Talex just shortly after, in March 1990. During their exchanges, Talex expressed the opinion that Istrati would have supported the regime change of 1989, as befitting his image of a "revolution carried out under the banner of childhood". Also then, he relaunched the Friends of Panait Istrati as a sister organization of its Valence namesake. In April, Alexandru and Nina Talex, alongside Cogălniceanu, Vârgolici, Popovici and Camelia Stănescu, hosted an Istrati-themed show at the National Museum of Art of Romania; it featured readings by actors Mirela Gorea, Adrian Pintea, and Florian Pittiș.

In 1991, Talex was able to publish at Editura Dacia his rendition of Istrati's main anti-communist essay, as Spovedanie pentru învinși. The book was lauded as a revelation by literary chronicler Cornel Ungureanu, who also noted that Talex's translation of it was simply "bad". Similarly, philologist Maria-Ana Tupan spoke of this version as an "inventory of all possible grammatical and stylistic errors", comprising barbarisms and "parasitical commas". As she notes, Talex had mistranslated Istrati's central slogan, "Let's head for the other flame!", as "Let's head for another flame!", thereby obscuring the intended meaning. Writer and actress Cristina Tacoi went further, noting that Talex had turned the text into something "stupid [and] ridiculous", for instance by translating sage-femme as "wise woman" (rather than the correct "midwife"). He was also criticized in Dreptatea newspaper for his introduction, which credited Oprea as an objective source—though Oprea had by then been accused by Lovinescu Jr and others of falsifying Istrati's statements, to tone down their critique of communism.

In 1995, sociologist Zigu Ornea generated controversy with his monograph on the fascist press of the interwar, including some excerpts from Cruciada. This allowed Lovinescu Jr to read young Talex's comments on her father. She found these to be "of the same level of violence, though with more civilized a tone", than similar pieces in the Iron Guard's Sfarmă-Piatră. The same year, ahead of his 86th birthday, Talex was received into the Writers' Union of Romania. A Romanian version of Le pèlerin du cœur appeared in 1998, alongside a revised two-volume edition of Cum am devenit scriitor, this time including all pages that could not be published under communism. Margareta had since died, and Talex made efforts to arrange her room into a museum—his application for official support was denied by the local authorities of Sector 2, who misunderstood it as a request for a building permit. Talex himself was largely cared for by his daughter Nina—according to Belciu, the task of tending to him destroyed what remained of Nina's physical youth. Nina herself recalls taking care of her father until he became too tired to carry on living. He died in Bucharest, on 17 November 1998, and was buried four days later at Iancul Nou Cemetery, outside Obor.

== Legacy ==
As remarked by Belciu on the occasion of Talex's death, his entire corpus of writings had made no mention of his own biography: "In forgetting himself, he only existed so that He [Istrati] would continue to exist." He was posthumously credited as a contributor to Istrati's complete-works edition, put out by Vârgolici in 2003. He had also produced a bibliography of Pârvan's press articles, which he left in the care of historian Alexandru Zub. Talex's daughter, who had been working at Sadoveanu Library since the 1980s, also took up Istratian studies. In 2005 she was a guest speaker at an Istrati conference at the Accademia di Romania in Rome, then at a Sibiu event hosted by the Organization of Social Democratic Women. A new Istrati translation project had by then been undertaken by Iorgulescu, whose contribution was seen by writer Adriana Bittel as "incomparably better than Talex's". In a 2010 article, comparatist Geo Vasile referred to Talex Sr as "nearly forgotten".
