= Mihai Gafița =

Romanian literary historian (1923–1977)

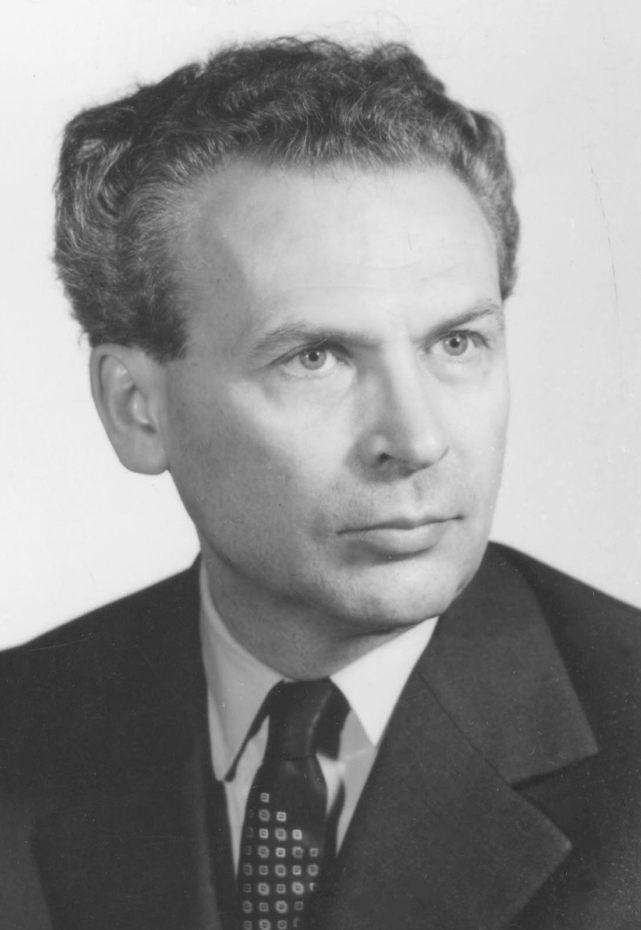
- Gafița, circa 1975
- Born: October 21, 1923; Baia, Baia County, Kingdom of Romania
- Died: March 4, 1977 (aged 53); Bucharest, Socialist Republic of Romania
- Occupations: Journalist; editor; publisher; political activist; educator; censor
- Writing career
- Period: 1942–1977
- Genres: Essay; fairy tale
- Movements: Socialist Realism; Marxist literary criticism

Mihai or Mihail Gafița (Francized Mikhaï Gafitza; October 21, 1923 – March 4, 1977) was a Romanian literary historian, critic, editor, and children's novelist, also noted as a communist activist and politician. He began his career during World War II, with pieces published in a youth magazine put out by Universul. During his time studying at the University of Bucharest, he became involved in left-wing agitation, joining the National Popular Party and serving as chairman of its youth sections, as well as of the National Union of Romanian Students. Having been embraced by the Romanian Communist Party (known then as the Workers' Party), Gafița emerged as one of its interpreters of Romanian literature, and excelled in particular as a writers' biographer. The late 1940s saw him espousing Socialist Realism, with noted fanaticism in public, but also working to reinstate disgraced authors such as Ion Vinea. He was controversially involved with coaxing the acclaimed writer Cezar Petrescu, converting him to communism and encouraging him to rewrite his novels on Socialist-Realist manner; Gafița also joined the ranks of communist censors by bracketing out thousands of pages from Petrescu's last novel.

In the mid-1960s, Gafița was director of a state-run publishing venue, Editura pentru Literatură, and was turning away from political writing—earning praise for his monographs on Petrescu and Duiliu Zamfirescu. His Stalinist positioning was poorly reviewed during the advent of national communism, which initially favored a cultural liberalization. Gafița was able to survive politically; he formed a lasting partnership with the unconventional novelist Marin Preda, which, in 1970, saw them taking over as managers of the reestablished publishing house, Cartea Românească. Gafița's stated resolve, that he would reach out to dissident writers, earned him attention from the Securitate secret police, and left him exposed during the Neo-Stalinist turn codified by the July Theses (1971). It was also put to the test by the anti-communist novelist Paul Goma, with whom Gafița had a major conflict, and on whom he informed to the Securitate.

Gafița's collections of critical essays continued to be written from a Marxist perspective. These were published in the mid-1970s, earning him approval, though not also general acclaim, for their explorations into 19th-century literary culture, as well as for their gentle humor. The author was crushed to death, alongside poet Anatol E. Baconsky, during the March 1977 earthquake. He left a troubled legacy, being resented for his role as a censor, though still appreciated for his biographical research. He was survived by two sons, Gabriel and Mihnea Gafița, both of whom took up careers in letters. Gabriel's involvement in the diplomatic service was tinged by controversy upon revelations that he had become a Securitate informant after his father's death.

== Biography ==
=== Early life and political engagement ===
A native of Baia, in present-day Suceava County, Gafița was the brother of children's author Viniciu Gafița. Mihai himself took pride in connecting with the literary traditions of historical Moldavia and Bukovina. He expressed these in a 1946 letter to Tudor Arghezi, where he discussed his affection for Moldavian novelist I. Dragoslav. He himself debuted as writer in 1942, with texts published by the children's supplement of Universul daily (Universul Copiilor). He preserved a link with that publication into 1943, when, as "one of the strangest coincidences" of his career, he assisted Alexandru George with debuting there—"alas!, not as a writer, but as an illustrator". Relations between Gafița and George chilled in later decades, with the latter noting in 1977 that "[Gafița] had no sympathy for the undersigned author, although he sometimes proved a decisive help in helping with him publish his works".

During his years as a literature student at the University of Bucharest (graduated 1948), Gafița joined the left-wing National Popular group, and became leader of its student branch. A 1952 report by the Workers' Party looked into the possibility that Gafița had previously affiliated with the anti-communist National Liberals and had served as chairman of their youth branch. In June 1946, he was elected to the presidium of the National Congress of Democratic Students, wherein he represented his alma mater. He was subsequently promoted by the nascent communist regime. Elected chairman of the National Union of Romanian Students (UNSR) by June 1947, he organized auditions for an Amateur Student Theater—alongside fellow activists Dan Deșliu and Silvian Iosifescu. In November, he represented the UNSR at a student conference in Sofia, People's Republic of Bulgaria.

Also serving as editor of Universul Copiilor in his student years, Gafița printed his own fairy-tale volume, Norocel și Zmeul Zmeilor ("Lucky Boy and the Boss of the Zmei"), in 1946. He put our several children's novels, either as books or in feuilleton. By 1950, when he began his career in teaching at various elementary schools, he had been inducted into the Workers' Party and had embraced Socialist Realism. He was employed for a while as one of the teachers at the Mihai Eminescu School of Literature and Literary Criticism, which functioned as an annex of the Romanian Writers' Union (USR), involved in the creation of a new literary elite "that would be entirely devoted to the single-party ideology". According to a critical review published in 2003 by literary historian Alex. Ștefănescu, Gafița was a resident expert on communist dogmas, and, on such grounds, was dispatched to recruit for the cause an interwar novelist, Cezar Petrescu. Gafița personally handled the project whereby Petrescu rewrote his earlier epics to weave in a Socialist-Realist message. Ștefănescu also notes Gafița's role in applying communist censorship: after Petrescu's death, the editor reduced the posthumous novel Vladim sau drumul pierdut from a 3,000-page manuscript to a 500-page published version, "purified of any demobilizing sadness."

In 1952, Gafița reported to the Workers' Party on the success of propaganda literature, criticizing authors such as Eusebiu Camilar, Ben Corlaciu, Alexandru Kirițescu and Cella Serghi, all of whom had presented unsatisfactory novels or plays depicting the collectivization of agriculture; he opposed these to the more orthodox writings of Mihu Dragomir, Petru Dumitriu, and Ioanichie Olteanu. In June of that year, Viața Romînească journal hosted his praise of Aurel Mihale's Ogoare noi ("New Fields"), seen by Gafița as the quintessential collectivization novel (though still imperfect, with its failure to underscore issues of class conflict). In May 1953, the same magazine hosted Gafița's mea culpa, in which he admitted that Mihale's "real fault" was the "gray atmosphere" of his writing. His extreme position on this topic was derided by D. Costea in Iașul Literar magazine. Costea noted that Gafița had resorted to a sociological assessment: "in our villages, which on average hold 300 to 500 families, there should be 15 to 20 chiabur figures"; according to Costea, if applied consistently, this rule would have resulted in Mihale's novel featuring "one half of a chiabur."

=== Stalinism and post-Stalinism ===
The two Gafița articles were separated by new aesthetic directives from the Soviet Union, where Georgy Malenkov had insisted on a tighter enforcement of literary dogmas. Gafița participated in the special meeting of the USR at which Malenkov's demands were made public; during the subsequent discussion, he opined that Romanian writers were not necessarily bound by Soviet realities, since Romania was at a different stage in socialist development. According to him: "in our [Romanian] reality, the literary type may include the decomposing and downfall of exploiting classes, [...] the old that crumbles as its attempts to resist that which comes alive". In early and mid-1953, Gafița took Malekov's theses and applied them to the analysis of new literary productions, and engaging in debates with the more tolerant staff of Almanahul Literar, including Anatol E. Baconsky. The latter had embraced Marin Preda as the great new Romanian novelist, who had ushered in a "new stage" of communist literature; Gafița contended that this analysis was conveniently nonspecific, asking Baconsky to explain his position. He also ridiculed Almanahul Literar for publishing alcohol education poetry by Victor Felea, and for allowing young critics to comment negatively on poets such as Dragomir and Eugen Jebeleanu.

At that stage, the increasingly dissident poet Nicolae Labiș ridiculed Gafița's dogmatism, dubbing him Megafița (from "megaphone"). Malenkov's attempt to reimpose strict Stalinism was closely followed by Joseph Stalin's death, which infused Romanian writers with hopes of liberalization. This was noted in a June 1954 secret report by Vigil Florea, of the Workers' Party Agitprop section, who contended that young authors were gravitating toward proven talents from the interwar, including George Călinescu, Șerban Cioculescu, and Victor Eftimiu; he quoted Cicerone Theodorescu as saying: "Better to be cussed by Călinescu, than to be praised by Gafița". Florea also noted that Gafița himself had embraced a "suspicious passivity. [...] He claims to be afraid that the party line may be changing, and therefore that he may be caught erring." The same source reported that Gafița had been heard reciting lyrics from an imprisoned far-right poet, Radu Gyr.

Completing editorial stints with Viața Romînească and Gazeta Literară, Gafița was co-opted as secretary of the USR; from 1955, he was also made lecturer at the Bucharest faculty of philology. He was at the time involved in promoting Camilar's new works of historical fiction, whom he praised for establishing the connection between Socialist-Realism, with its aesthetic preference for "large movements of the masses", and Romanian folklore. His colleagues at Viața Romînească were critical of his "transparently apologetic attitude", since he had glossed over Camilar's apparent lack of interest for any character studies. He also had to deal with the student movement of October 1956, which echoed the anti-communist revolt in Hungary; in November, one of his lectures was interrupted by the dissident student Paul Goma, who demanded justice for colleagues who had been placed under arrest. Gafița responded by calling Goma a "reactionary", and by reporting on him to his party supervisors—partly as a result of this, Goma himself was imprisoned on charges of "public agitation" against the regime.

Gafița's articles in Gazeta offered interpretations of Marxism-Leninism, and covered the supposed dissidence of other writers. In a July 1958 piece, he attacked critics Alexandru Piru and Ion Negoițescu for their "systematic and brazen attitude in rejecting the theses of Marxism-Leninism", accusing them of upholding the "bourgeois ideology". This period saw Gafița involved as a literary biographer, with contributions to all high-school literary manuals of the 1950s (and down to a 1961 textbook that he put out alongside Savin Bratu and Constantin Ciopraga); with Tiberiu Bănulescu, he also produced a bio-bibliographic brochure for the use of libraries in rural areas. He had father two boys, Gabriel (born on March 3, 1952) and Mihnea, and was living with them and his wife in Bucharest. Initially, they all shared one room in an apartment also inhabited by three or four other families. In early 1961, Gafița Sr was employed as manager by Editura de Stat pentru Literatură și Artă (ESPLA, the state-run publishing venue), which allowed him and his family to move into a spacious apartment. In this capacity, he refused to print a biography of Goethe by Felix Aderca, objecting to its size, and reporting his skepticism about Aderca's adherence to Marxism-Leninism. In his reply, Aderca offered to have his tomes submitted for an ideological review.

Around 1960, the regime allowed for the reconsideration of "progressive" writers from the previous era, including Constantin Stere; Gafița oversaw this project. The resulting paradox was commented upon by Stere's disciple Petre Pandrea, who was serving time Aiud prison and allowed to keep notebooks: "The bourgeoisie had him labeled as 'that traitor C. Stere'. His official proletarian critics have tread on [those] soft tracks. Yet here is Mihai Gafița, that lively critic, studying him for one volume." Later that decade, Gafița was employed as a chief editor at Editura pentru Literatură, which had branched out of ESPLA. He was now at odds with the general lines of communist censorship, instead "support[ing] and encourag[ing] many of his peers"; examples include the proscribed poet Dimitrie Stelaru. Gafița and Henriette Yvonne Stahl worked together on editing the novel Lunatecii, by the formerly banned Ion Vinea. It appeared in 1965, months after Vinea had died. Gafița was especially celebrated for his own monographs on Petrescu (1963) and Duiliu Zamfirescu (1969). A fellow editor, Teodor Tihan, called him one of Romanian literature's "most sensible and devoted admirers", and one of the authors best suited to revisit and popularize classical literature. Fellow scholar Gabriel Dimisianu admired his work on Zamfirescu: "every biographical detail, every piece of news collected in period newspapers, every bit of the documentary trove that one finds in [Zamfirescu's] correspondence, in his casual notations, every such thing is gathered up for mapping out not just a critical portrait, but also a whole world revisited, a whole spiritual climate come alive through the passionate pages." Writer Alexandru Talex saw Gafița as having ensured Zamfirescu's recognition as "one of the founders of the Romanian novel".

=== Cartea Românească and death ===
As argued in 2010 by essayist Magda Ursache, the ascent of Nicolae Ceaușescu as communist leader had ushered in an era of "mock-liberalization", in which there was little room for "literary Stakhanovites" such as Gafița, Ion Vitner, and Leonte Răutu. During the second half of 1969, poet Miron Radu Paraschivescu publicly lambasted Vitner and Gafița with his column in România Literară. As he noted:

M. Gafița [...], that formerly intransigent dogmatic, had changed his dogma into a heartwarming liberalism. Which, to make it clear, would not be at all objectionable—quite the contrary. But, may we be well understood on this point, M. Gafița has never represented, and cannot ever represent, an authority on literary matters; that he now does not care for Maiorescu, but tomorrow will, is finally indifferent to all of us: indifferent to Maiorescu, indifferent to [our readers], and even indifferent to me personally. That is, if M. Gafița were not to occupy a seat, whence he directs the publication of poetry books (and of criticism as well?) at what is presently the largest literary publishing house.

From early 1970, Gafița was employed as the inaugural head of Cartea Românească (CR), created as a publishing branch of the USR. This initiative revived an interwar publishing house: the old CR had been broken apart in 1948, on charges of being "fascist"; the national communist establishment, which had taken over by 1965, restored is part of a quasi-liberal set of de-Stalinization measures. Gafița served in that directorial position throughout his final years, seconded by Preda—who handled the "production of books"—and heading a staff which also included Alexandru Ivasiuc, Alexandru Paleologu, and Dumitru Țepeneag.

By 1971, Gafița had made it his personal mission to bring "the certainly valuable side of current literature [to] a greatest circles of the reading public", and personally reaching out to writers, rather than waiting on them to send their manuscripts. His liberalizing contribution was curbed by the July Theses of that year, when Neo-Stalinism became an official tenet; as a result, Gafița and Preda were placed under near-constant surveillance by agents of the Securitate. These reported on his private conversations, where he presented himself as chief of the "best publishing house", and openly acknowledged that he took pains to ensure publication for the politically unorthodox. Preda's permanent file reports that he and Gafița had a "hostile attitude and suspicious connections", "faciliat[ing] the publication of politically nonconformist works". The limits of Gafița's own commitment were tested early on by his 1956 rival, Goma—whom Gafița reportedly tried to coax into writing "like the Onirists", "with no problematical issues". In April 1970, Goma submitted his novel, Ușa ("The Door"), to be reviewed by Gafița, Preda, and Ivasiuc. The latter vetoed its publication, arguing that the work was satirizing Romania's First Lady, Elena Ceaușescu. Looking back on the incident in 2003, Goma described this interpretation as "Ivasiuc's lie", noting that Gafița and Preda were "scared" into believing it. In 1973, the head of censorship, Dumitru Popescu-Dumnezeu, personally intervened to stop Gafița from reviewing Goma's Ostinado; Gafița was consequently recruited by the Securitate to inform on Goma, signing his reports with the pseudonym "Fălticeanu".

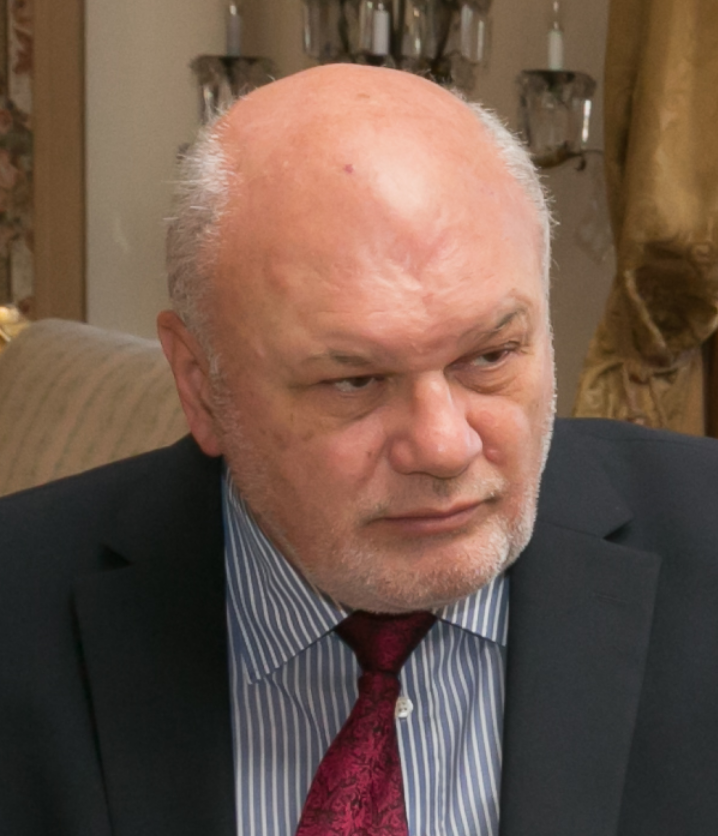
Gabriel Gafița in December 2017

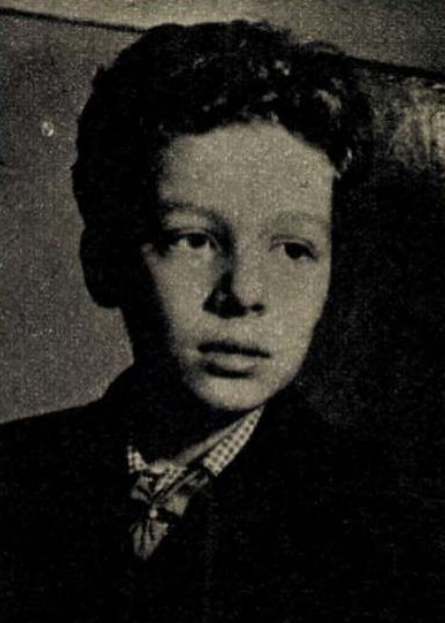
Mihnea Gafița in November 1971

In 1974, Gafița returned with his last book, the critical anthology Fața ascunsă a lunii ("Dark Side of the Moon"). Put out by the CR, and "nearly invisible to the critics", it earned a sympathetic review from Serafim Duicu, in a July 1976 issue of Vatra. Duiciu noted the work's "retroprojection" of 19th-century cultural debates, with his plea for reassessing Constantin Dobrogeanu-Gherea—at a time when "critics, the majority of whom are young", were busy with discovering and discussing Postmodernism. The conflict of interpretation also created a rift between Gafița and fellow literary scholar Henri Zalis, when the latter expected that the CR would publish his study on literary naturalism. As Zalis reports: "[Gafița] offered me reprimands and haughty advice." Zalis notes that such attitudes were pushing authors, including himself, to sign contracts with the more "respectful" publishing houses in provincial cities. From 1975, Gafița's son Gabriel, who collaborated with Editura Dacia of Cluj-Napoca, experienced international success: his novels which were translated and circulated throughout the Eastern Bloc.

In early 1977, Gafița Sr was working with Talex on a project to publish the letters and autobiographical texts by Panait Istrati—but this was cut short by his death. He fell victim to the Vrancea–Bucharest earthquake on March 4, 1977, as one of nine literary professionals to be killed by this disaster. Most, including Gafița and Baconsky, were crushed by debris while attending a Bucharest evening-party hosted by Mihail Petroveanu and Veronica Porumbacu (who were also killed). His body was one of the first to be picked up and identified from the wreckage. Diarist Pericle Martinescu, who reported that both Gafița and his wife had died together "in the same building on I. Ghica Street", notes it as unusual that their fate, as well as those of Baconsky and actor Toma Caragiu, became immediately known to the public, "even as public transport was at a standstill, and with phone lines that are hardly functional".

== Legacy ==
A posthumous book of essays appeared later that year, as Flautul lui Marsias ("Marsyas' Flute"). It was praised by Alexandru George, who noted its humorous tinges, with "a sense of proportion that is characteristic in men of intelligence". According to George, Gafița was mainly valuable for his personal witnessing of literary history, but had never managed to write down his memoirs. Dimisianu similarly argued: "Talkative and associative, he accessed an endless trove of events from our literary life, old and new alike; I have no idea if he ever put to paper anything of what he recounted with such dedication, with humor, and sometimes with sadness, but he surely would have wanted to".

As noted by literary historian Nicolae Scurtu, "some of his collaborators and peers [pushed Gafița] into a blind-spot, that he surely did not deserve." In 1979, the CR put out a work of memoirs by Ion Petrovici, with a preface by its former director. The text drew criticism from A. Braester in Era Socialistă, since Gafița, though an "eminent man of progressive culture", had failed to explain the passages in which Petrovici expressed his sympathy for Romania's far-right movements (including the Iron Guard). On different grounds, other authors went public with their disdain for Gafița after the Romanian Revolution of 1989. In a 2002 article, his old rival George listed him among the "zealous agents of the [early communist] moment", on par with Bratu and Paul Georgescu—though still less servile than Ovid Crohmălniceanu. Three years later, critic Gheorghe Grigurcu recounted that Gafița had been a "loyal henchman" to Preda, and that both had defrauded the state by arranging "massive print after massive print" for the CR novelists. In 2012, author Gelu Ionescu argued that Gafița, a "staunch defender of socialist realism", was only appointed to lead the CR because Preda wished to have "less of a hassle in dealing with 'the structures'". During a 2008 interview, political scientist Vladimir Tismăneanu proposed that, "regretfully", Gafița had served as one of the "fanatical politruci" who had assisted in the act of "cultural degradation during 1948–1956."

Mihai's brother Viniciu continued to write into the 1990s, and died, aged 80, in 2006. Beginning in the 1980s, Gabriel Gafița had embarked on projects of international cooperation, and was visiting the Hungarian People's Republic on a regular basis. Under contract with Editura Kriterion, he curated a Hungarian-language volume of Cezar Petrescu's novellas—translated by László Kardos-Körtvélyfái, and arranged the same as in his father's first edition. Specialized in minority issues, Gabriel later moved into the diplomatic service; his contributions were tinged by controversy upon the discovery that, as "Rosetty", he had been a Securitate informant after 1977—in June 2009, a definitive court ruling defined him as engaged in political persecution under the previous regime. Recalled from his position as Romanian Ambassador to Portugal, he continued to deny that he was "Rosetty", and claimed instead that the Securitate had also targeted him. The literary career was also embraced by Mihnea, who became an editor and translator. In 1992, his version of George Orwell's Animal Farm appeared at Editura Univers.
