= Dimitrie Stelaru =

Romanian poet (1917–1971)

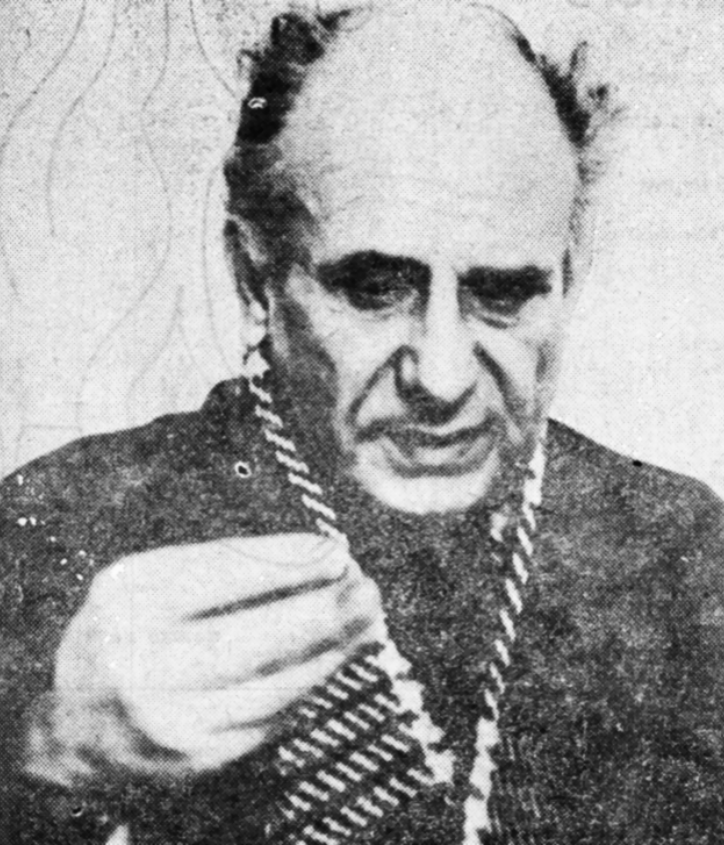
- Stelaru during an interview with Adrian Păunescu for România Literară, 1969
- Born: Dumitru Petrescu; 8 March 1917; Segarcea-Vale, Teleorman County, German-occupied Romania
- Died: 28 November 1971 (aged 54); Bucharest, Socialist Republic of Romania
- Occupations: Journalist; porter; stevedore; coal miner; day laborer; art teacher; antiquarian bookseller
- Writing career
- Period: c. 1935–1971
- Genres: Lyric poetry; epic poetry; free verse; ode; madrigal; short story; persona poetry; autofiction; memoir; fairy tale; verse drama; satire; epigram; reportage; Christian poetry; political poetry
- Literary movement: Neo-romanticism; Expressionism; Sburătorul; Surrealism; Proletarian literature; Socialist Realism; Absurdist theater

Dimitrie Stelaru (pen name of Dumitru Petrescu, later formalized as Petrescu-Stelaru; 8 March 1917 – 28 November 1971) was a Romanian avant-garde poet, novelist, playwright, and bohemian figure. Originating from the rural area of Teleorman County, he was paternally orphaned at birth, in the Romanian campaign of World War I. He was adopted by a bricklayer from Turnu Măgurele, who turned the boy toward the Seventh-day Adventist Church and forced him to undergo religious education. In his adolescence, Stelaru rebelled against this upbringing, and took up poetry—initially Christian-themed or neo-romantic in content. He became a habitual vagrant, taking up jobs from porter and stevedore to coal miner. His youth is hard to reconstruct, due to patchy records and Stelaru's own passion for autofiction; it is however known that he lived in extreme poverty in Bucharest, romantically involved with a tuberculosis-stricken woman, who became the focus of his early love poems.

Despite his own pedigree within the precariat, Stelaru shunned proletarian literature in the 1930s; his only influence from left-wing culture was Panait Istrati, who became one of his favorite writers. While preserving the trappings of neo-romanticism, and drawing heavily from Edgar Allan Poe, he sometimes embraced an extreme form of literary naturalism, and slid into literary Expressionism. The ethereal qualities of his poetic imagery, meanwhile, were informed by his familiarity with Surrealism, to which he also introduced his writer friend, Constant Tonegaru. Stelaru himself was discovered by fellow poet Eugen Jebeleanu, and became the focus of veneration by the younger writers. By 1944, he had built up a literary network which included Jebeleanu, Tonegaru, Geo Dumitrescu, Ion Caraion, Pavel Chihaia, Ben Corlaciu, Mihu Dragomir, and Miron Radu Paraschivescu. His contribution as a poet bridged the gap between the older modernists at Sburătorul (where he was personally welcomed by Eugen Lovinescu) and avant-garde circles, including Albatros and Adonis.

Experiencing literary fame by the start of World War II, Stelaru amused himself by staging his own death in 1940. Over the following years, he tried to slide back into vagrancy and obscurity, as a draft evader. Upon the war's end, he reemerged as an art teacher in Sighișoara, and made a brief return to publishing. Such projects were ended with the rise of a communist regime in 1947; Stelaru embraced proletarian themes, but abhorred the guidelines of Socialist Realism. He and Chihaia unsuccessfully tried to defect as stowaways, from Constanța Port. The regime reciprocated his disdain with a ban on his work, also preventing him from even joining the Writers' Union of Romania. Stelaru lived out the ban as an unemployed man in Turnu Măgurele, but was slowly reinstated in the mid-1950s, when he was allowed to publish modern fairy tales and works of children's drama. Again lambasted in 1958, he was finally recovered and progressively rehabilitated in the early 1960s.

Returning to his work and formally consecrated by the Writers' Union, Stelaru was also given his first permanent home—an apartment in Berceni, where he lived with his third wife and second child. Between 1967 and 1971, he produced a large corpus of poetry and prose, including new plays which echoed Absurdism. He was then physically incapacitated by cirrhosis, which ultimately killed him in November 1971. His work was again ignored, then rediscovered in the mid-to-late 1980s; by then, his descendants had split between Romania and West Germany.

== Biography ==
=== Early life ===
Stelaru's parents were Dumitru "Mitică" Petrescu, a boot-maker and later a farmer and cobbler who was killed, shortly before his only son's birth, on the front in World War I, and his wife Pasca (née Popescu, also known as Pasca Preutu or Preotu). Memoirist Petre Pandrea reports that, in his private circle, Stelaru was seen as a Romani man, isolated "among us whites". Pandrea cites as his source the sculptor Ion Vlad, who further alleged that this "Gypsy" origin explained why Stelaru acted as an asocial nomad. Dimitrie Jr had great respect for his deceased father, but, as noted by Pandrea (and ultimately by Vlad), he displayed a "historical illiteracy" which allowed him to confuse Mitică's first wartime experience, in the Second Balkan War (1913), with the Romanian War of Independence (1877–1878).

Literary history records the poet's birthday as 8 March 1917, and note that he was a native of Segarcea-Vale, in Teleorman. The date was once verified by Stelaru himself, who noted that the official record had "9 March", due to his family waiting a full day before reporting the event; the document itself does in fact mention the exact date as being 8 March. This account also contradicts earlier claims that he had been born in 1916. Stelaru likewise suggested that his birthplace was Turnu Măgurele—though also recording his belief that: "It doesn't matter what city I'm from. [...] Small cities [...] have no tradition. They're pretty much all the same." As noted by writer Gabriela Ursachi, Stelaru was always casually discreet about his biography, encouraging confusion. He was explicit about these intentions with the autobiographical lyrics:

Să nu te apropii de sufletul meu
Cînd sînt plecat

Translation:

Never approach my soul
When I'm away

Dumitru Jr, known to his family as "Mitea" or "Mitia", was baptized a Romanian Orthodox in Parascheva Church, where Pasca's father was a cantor. He was in fact a resident of Turnu Măgurele from age seven, after his mother married local bricklayer Florea Stoicea. The latter switched the family away from Orthodoxy and toward the Seventh-day Adventist Church. The boy was at odds with his stepfather, who wished to guide him toward practical trades, in spite of his clear inclinations. After attending primary school and three grades of high school in Sfântul Haralambie of Turnu Măgurele, in 1931 Mitea was transferred to the Biblical Institute for Christian Education in Stupinii Prejmerului, Brașov County—an institution run by the Adventists and also attended by his stepsister Oprica. A literary fragment from his 1960s manuscripts notes Mitea's disdain for Protestant evangelism in general, through the words of a day laborer, Chivu: "I knew how to put up with stuff, how to doze off on my two legs, not to mention the beatings—I knew, as it were, only how they could harm a body. The teachers at the religious school had different areas of expertise, they worked me up from within, they wrapped up my mind in all sorts of religious contortions—if they could just get me to stumble! [...] Just picture how some devils can beguile a naive soul!"

The school's austere, vegetarian and dogmatic regimen did not agree with Petrescu, and he escaped in 1935 or 1936; his trace was lost. His 1968 autobiographical novel Zeii prind șoareci ("Gods Chasing Mice") partly sheds light on his bohemian lifestyle in sordid environs. He had descended into vagrancy after moving to Bucharest, where he slept in the homeless shelter, or shared an improvised home with a young woman, known as both Olivia and Maria-Maria, who was dying from tuberculosis. His odd jobs included: occasional porter at Bucharest North railway station, porter and stevedore at Constanța and Brăila, day laborer at Sighișoara. He told several self-aggrandizing stories such as having once visited Paris to meet with Louis Bromfield; when pressed about the details, he responded: "I traveled there by truck, I hardly remember anything, I was drunk the whole time." Various sources suggest that he engaged in petty theft (of "forks, knives, money"), and that, when caught in the act, he explained that he intended to collect funds for his own statue. For a while, he traveled the Jiu Valley, employed there as a coal miner.

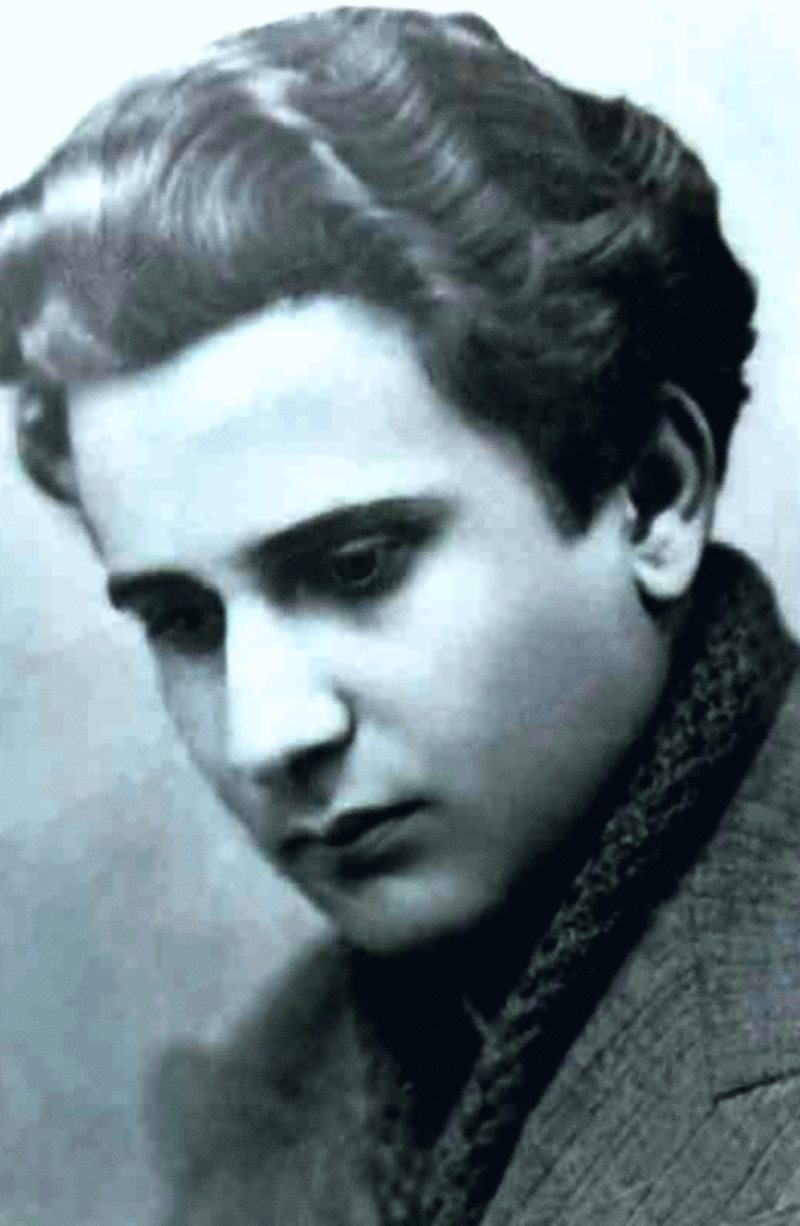
The future Dimitrie Stelaru at age sixteen

No public records exist to suggest that Petrescu was ever a graduate of any institution beyond primary schooling, though he much later claimed that he took a diploma from the University of Bucharest Faculty of Letters. In 1970, Stelaru declined to answer a direct question about his studies, while noting: "I never contradicted anyone, not even those who swore to have seen me in the [university] lecture halls." Throughout his travels in the provinces, he allegedly maintained links with the various literary circles, reading profusely from Edgar Allan Poe and Paul Valéry. He is assumed to have been entirely self-taught, and, as noted by fellow poet Petre Stoica, eventually "read anything he could get his hands on". By his own account, his first attempts were heavily inspired by the works of a Romanian classic, Mihail Eminescu, but their publication was mainly intended to cover the cost of his meals. In 2016, his first cousin Natalia Popescu recalled that her father, Melinte, had in fact sponsored Mitea to continue writing, and eventually publish, his poetry.

=== Debut and death-hoax ===
Petrescu's published debut was the 1935 poetry book Melancolie ("Melancholy"), mainly containing religious verses and signed with the pen name D. Orfanul ("D. The Orphan"); another pen name he used was D. Petrescu-Orfanul. For a long time, it was believed his debut took place with poems in the Bucharest-based Adventist magazine Semnele Timpului in 1936, but this assertion was later disproved. Researcher Gheorghe Sarău notes that Semnele Timpului did in fact publish samples of Petrescu's religious verse, but only after the student had fled. There followed the Eminescu-influenced poetry collections Blestem ("Curse", whose very existence was considered as doubtful until a copy was recovered in 1990), Cerșetorul ("The Beggar"), Abracadabra (both 1937) and Preamărirea durerii ("Glory to Pain", 1938). As the poet noted, the latter brought his switch to free verse, which was largely "unintended". Critic D. Micu argues that Stelaru always remained indebted to the urban-themed portion of Eminescian poetry, which depicts the city as a depressing "anthill".

The claim to have discovered and promoted "Orfanul" was stated by poet-journalist Eugen Jebeleanu. Another generation colleague, Ion Caraion, suggests that Jebeleanu, "his eye like a nib", found Petrescu among the "tramps" (cloșarzi), and then propelled him into literary life. He created the pen name Dimitrie Stelaru ("The Stellar One") in 1938 or early 1939, upon Jebeleanu's suggestion: "Jebeleanu once confronted me: 'Why would you sign yourself as The Orphan, when you are stellar?'" He would eventually adopt it as a legal surname, in the composite form of "Petrescu-Stelaru". Under this new signature, Petrescu began contributing to reviews and literary supplements such as Gândul Nostru and Adevărul Literar și Artistic. As he himself recalled in 1969, he took many interviews of people that were published throughout the daily press—except for Universul (though Stelaru's work appeared in the latter's sister paper, Universul Literar).

As Stelaru notes, he was part of an informal group which also included Ion Ronda, Ștefan Strănescu, and Constantin Almăjean, followed later by Ben Corlaciu and Constant Tonegaru. The herald of a "cynical generation" in Romanian poetry, he became an unwilling mentor to debuting poets who had lionized him, primarily including Miron Radu Paraschivescu and Geo Dumitrescu. He took credit for establishing a connection between Jebeleanu and Paraschivescu, as well as for having introduced Tonegaru to Surrealism. With Tonegaru, Stelaru also visited sculptor-novelist Ion Vlasiu, who recalled that, in reality, the two poets had a tumultuous relationship: "They just could not get along with each other. Stelaru held a grudge against Tonegaru, whom he abused and provoked." Similarly, Stelaru was dismissive of Ion Vlad, to whom he addressed an epigram:

Sub această cruce mare
Cioplită din lemn de brad
Doarme-un sculptor oarecare
Născut Vlad

Translation:

Underneath this firwood cross
Buried here in this mud
Lies a sculptor, not a great loss,
Born as Vlad

Stelaru was also sporadically attending the Sburătorul literary circle, formed around literary scholar Eugen Lovinescu—who noted that Stelaru was a "frightened bat", near-silent in the presence of other writers. Jebeleanu took credit for introducing Stelaru: "Lovinescu smiled incredulously, as if calling my bluff. However, the loyal man that he was, he recognized, within a few years, the presence of an authentic poet, and did more than a reparation: just shortly before he died, he penned a small, unreservedly enthusiastic study on Stelaru's poetry." Writer Eugen Barbu, who first encountered Stelaru's work through Lovinescu's portrait, notes that the effect was a "jolt[ing] of the bourgeois mindset that was prevalent in that age, now ready to admit that poets could wear greasy trench coats directly over their skin." This was also reported by poet Virgil Gheorghiu, an eyewitness: "those in the audience noted that [Stelaru] was wearing his cape directly over his naked body."

Sometimes described as Lovinescu's final discovery, Stelaru won the literary prize created by România Literară in 1939. Stelaru's practical jokes were directed as his own public image, and he announced his own death in a 10 June 1940 issue of Semnalul daily; "the press howled for a week", allowing him to relish in reading his obituaries (including one by Dumitrescu). The news was taken up in România daily, which mourned the loss, and announced that Stelaru would be buried in Turnu Măgurele—again described here as his place of birth. Reportedly, his relatives in Teleorman were asked to come pick up his casket in town. Since it never arrived, they traveled to Bucharest, only to find Stelaru "partying". As recounted by Stelaru, the hoax persuaded many in the literary community, including poet Emil Botta; when he reunited with Botta, the latter was shocked: "He thought he was seeing a ghost". Caraion, who recalls the events as taking place in 1943, claims that he was the only newspaper editor not to be fooled into publishing an obituary—and also that his abstention irked Stelaru.

=== Albatros years ===
Critic Alexandru Piru argues that, during the early stages of World War II, Stelaru had completed three more books, but their publication cannot be verified: Cetatea de marmură ("Marble Citadel", 1939; in a 1969 interview, Stelaru stated the title was Trepte de marmură, or "Marble Steps"), Vagabondul ("The Vagabond", 1941) and Trecere ("A Passing", 1942). The latter was included on a list of planned volumes by Editura Alfa, a publishing company launched by Paraschivescu and Sergiu Filerot. From May 1941, Dumitrescu began putting out the literary journal Albatros, with Stelaru published therein from the very first issue—with poems celebrating individual freedom, but also with a madrigal for Olivia.

Later in life, Stelaru took credit for getting the magazine being banned by the Ion Antonescu regime, before September. The poet cultivated his own legend as a combatant in World War II, but was in fact a draft evader: he persuaded the military authorities by claiming, falsely so, that he was taking care of many younger siblings, and that he had been diagnosed as a schizoid type. In a 2002 letter, Dumitrescu informed his friends that he did not regard himself as a member of the movement against Antonescu, discrediting urban legends that he had once shouted: "Down with Antonescu!" His milder act of defiance was shouting "Long live Jules Laforgue!", and would not have been taken place at all were it not for Stelaru's drinking habits: he and Dumitrescu had shared a 1-liter bottle of peppermint-flavored brandy (rachiu), leaving them uninhibited and querulous.

In March 1942, a group of actors, including Maria Filotti and Tantzi Cocea, decided to stage a benefit show, collecting money "toward editing a book by poet Dimitrie Stelaru." Novelist Ionel Teodoreanu was announced as the master of ceremonies. Noaptea geniului ("A Night of Genius"), which appeared later that year, and Ora fantastică ("That Fantastic Hour", printed in 1944, with Lovinescu's laudatory preface) are seen by reviewers as Stelaru's core works, encompassing all the lyrical motifs of his mature years. Stelaru's contribution is uneven and difficult to classify by a single standard; his poetry is one of damnation and bohemian existence; drawing freely from Poe and especially Paul Verlaine, it is heavily marked by Expressionism. Notes of literary naturalism predominate in poems where he described his bonding with Olivia/Maria-Maria on a lice-infested, blood-stained bed; these scenes are unexpectedly followed by a transfiguration of misery into "overwhelming tenderness", describing his lover as a body of light. Caraion writes that "the biographical queues in Stelaru's poetry reach a certain transparency, an elevation, an oracular halo, even when they emerge out of pestilence or cosmic malaise."

As noted overall by scholar Petru Comarnescu: "Mr Dimitrie Stelaru's poetry encompasses very many things in rather few lines and words. It is indeed amazing how a none-too-rich and non-too-varied imagination still manages to configure visions that are so large and so resounding, and to empower make-belief toward the realm of the fantastic." Writer and critic Gheorghe Grigurcu discusses Stelaru's "nervous, fevered theatrics", adding: "Still, no infatuation can be found here. Only the thrill of a bitter confraternity which excludes the ambition of hierarchies". On such grounds, Grigurcu finds "no sacrilegious flavor" in Prea tîrziu, where Stelaru likens himself to Jesus:

Dimitrie Stelaru, noul Cristos, se va ridica lîngă tine, rănit,
Scuipat, bătut, alungat
Profețind: 'prea tîrziu' —
Prea tîrziu, vierme golit.

Translation:

A wounded Dimitrie Stelaru shall rise, Christ reborn,
Beaten, spat on, and chased out
He'll announce: 'it's too late' —
It's too late for you, you vacuous worm.

As read by Comarnescu in 1945, Stelaru was at core a figure in neo-romanticism, "in line with" Poe, William Blake, Samuel Taylor Coleridge, and Arthur Rimbaud. The same author believes that Ora fantastică also incorporated the poetic experiments of Surrealism. In a 1947 chronicle, Ion Negoițescu assessed that Stelaru and Tonegaru were the "first heralds of [the] new Surrealism, perhaps of a more organic kind, because it was not as programmatic as the prewar kind". Another critic, Aurel Martin, notes that Stelaru shied away from social realism and revolutionary rhetoric—in contrast with 1930s poets such as Mihai Beniuc and Aron Cotruș. "Despite his own existential experiences", "Orfanul" was indifferent to the social message. He was instead fascinated by the biographies of Poe and Panait Istrati, and, stylistically, preferred to be absorbed by the staples of neo-romanticism and Symbolism.

Grigurcu similarly remarks that, "though a proletarian through and through, Stelaru showed no interest in left-wing ideas. A romanticism recast in modernist trappings pushed him into a poetic creation that stood at odds with his precarious situation." Also according to Martin, this line of thinking establishes a link between Stelaru and another 1930s poet, Mihu Dragomir, as well as between the Dumitrescu faction and Dragomir's own group, Adonis. In his autofictional poems, Stelaru gave himself several monikers to symbolize his fundamental restlessness—including "the vagabond angel", "the chronic nomad", and "the alcoholic practitioner". The "almost descriptive" references to his marginal status in society are found in lyrics such as:

Noi, Dimitrie Stelaru, n-am cunoscut niciodată Fericirea
Noi n-am avut alt soare decit Umilința.
Dar pînă cînd, înger vagabond, pînă cînd
Trupul acesta gol și flămînd?

Translation:

We, Dimitrie Stelaru, have never known Happiness
Having had no sun other than Shame.
And yet, my vagabond angel, for how long ahead
Must we suffer this body, naked and unfed?

=== Antonescu-era repression and late 1940s ===
Humorist and raconteur Vlad Mușatescu reports that, by 1942, Stelaru had entered a "dark, so very dark, phase", largely because he had grown tired of having to sleep on the North-Station benches. Mușatescu invited Stelaru into his own rented home, located in the Bucharest area of Chibrit, where they spent Christmas together, in destitute conditions. Stelaru reportedly sold one of Mușatescu's trench coats, and nearly prostituted himself with the landlady, in order to obtain food and rachiu for their two-man party. Stelaru's poems were given a public reading by Alexandru Talex during the commemoration of Istrati's death in April 1943, to an audience comprising Panait Mușoiu, Aida Vrioni, and Ștefan Voitec. Like Dumitrescu, he had come to display a "fraternal affection" toward Istrati. The novelist appears in one of Stelaru's poems for Albatros as one of the "three dead ones" who watch over a war-torn humanity (the other ones are Jesus and Lord Byron).

The narrative in Zeii prind șoareci suggests that Stelaru was planning to live in hiding in Turnu Măgurele, "where the land ends", but that he was ultimately forced to move out of the area. He also depicted himself as an enemy of Antonescu's alliance with Nazi Germany. In one of his memoirs, he reports having visited the fascist engraver Gheorghe Ceglokoff at Dacia Traiană publishing house, to ask for a favor; it happened that Ceglokoff was also receiving a visit from a uniformed Wehrmacht soldier. The poet was willingly provocative, and threw out a copy of the Mein Kampf into a nearby fireplace; the soldier was outraged, and proceeded to beat Stelaru—but, "by some miracle", never managed to arrest him. Stelaru's situation was changed for the better when the Antonescu government was toppled by a multi-party coup, which Stelaru later labeled as Romania's "unchaining" (descătușare). In 1945–1946, he had returned to Sighișoara, where he was employed to teach art at a private school founded by physician Alexandru Culcer. He later presented himself as a co-founder of the school, which he depicted as an institution of higher learning—with himself as a "university professor".

Stelaru had begun writing children's stories, including one short piece for his employer's boy, the future literary critic Dan Culcer. A new volume of his verse appeared in June 1946 as Cetățile albe ("White Citadels")—a motif which he used to describe a metaphysical state, to which he still aspired. The poems were panned by the literary chronicler at Rampa, who argued: "More verselets than they are verses, with their murky mysticism they always give the impression of incompleteness. [...] D. Stelaru's posing as an 'accursed poet', rather than the sheer designation as 'poet', results not just in some easily obtained triumphs with the generously enthusiastic bohemians, but also ushers in the permanent specter of failure." Barbu first met Stelaru around that time, "in the home of a lady artist". He discovered that Stelaru was not romantic and violent, as he had been depicted by Lovinescu and others, but rather practicing a "puerile Gandhism, stirred up in him by drinks he consumed with so much patience that he made me suspicious."

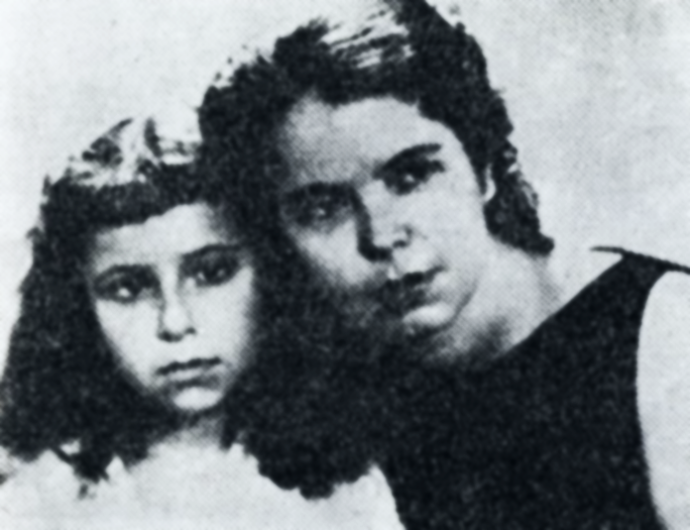
Despina Berlingher and Eumene Stelaru, c. 1955

On 13 June 1947, Stelaru married the 26-year-old teacher Despina Berlingher, with whom he returned into his mother's house in Turnu Măgurele. In February 1948, they settled in Northern Dobruja, where Despina worked at various schools including that of Chirnogeni; a daughter, Eumene Iustina, was born to the couple in late 1949, while they were living in Negru Vodă. The nascent communist regime clamped down on nonconformist literature, and, after Cetățile albe, Stelaru underwent the fate of several in his literary generation—including his friends Dumitrescu, Tonegaru, and Pavel Chihaia. The latter two joined him in an effort to defect: they presented themselves for employment as laborers in the Port of Constanța, where they were hoping to board a ship sailing out of the country. Only Stelaru passed the physical test, but then injured his back while carrying sacks of merchandise. Chihaia reported in a 1993 interview about their failed attempt to board an Argentine freighter, the Ceibo, and about their backup plan, which was to sail a caïque out of Mamaia.

According to one notice from November 1948, Stelaru was preparing for print a children's book, Copilul negru ("The Black Child"), and had been commissioned to write a working-class novel, centered on his fellow stevedores. From Chirnogeni, he sent his manuscripts including Copilul negru, to Bucharest's state-run publishing houses, but complained to Dumitrescu that he was never informed about their fate. Stelaru also tried to persuade "Comrade Dumitrescu", who had been embraced by the new regime, to feature his texts in Flacăra. In 1949, he was included on a political-and-cultural panel which was organizing the Eminescu Centennial celebrations in Constanța.

=== Censoring and obscurity ===
In 1952, an audit of the Writers' Union of Romania (USR) reported that "Dumitru Stelaru of Constanța" was one of several "so-called writers, people who are either suspect or downright hostile to [our] regime", and who had still managed to obtain state loans. Stelaru's sum ran at almost 125 thousand lei. He had been effectively banned from publishing the same year, and as such prevented from joining the USR—until October 1955, when he was allowed there by the nonconformist chairman Zaharia Stancu, who may have shielded Stelaru from more serious persecution. On the first days of 1950, he was still in Constanța, and allowed to lecture at a meeting of the local USR, wherein writers celebrated the regime's second anniversary. He abandoned his wife and daughter in mid-1950, and moved back to Bucharest; he was later spotted as an antiquarian bookseller on Zalomit Street. In late 1950, "the heretic Dimitrie Stelaru" met Petre Stoica and other enthusiasts, who "took great risks" in coming to see him at Taica Lazăr tavern. Upon questioning his new pupils, Stelaru confessed that he could not recite any poem by Alexandru Toma, the Socialist-Realist poet-laureate. In 1952, he spent some time "on the Jiu Valley, collecting material for a play which he never wrote."

Also in 1952, Stoica and Alexandru Leca Morariu welcomed Stelaru into their improvised lodging, which was a Bucharest basement on Armenească Street 17A; they stayed together "for about a year", to "mid-1953." According to Stoica, he was often in a state of drunken stupor, alternating between "delirious optimism" and threatening behavior. In one episode, recounted by Stoica, Stelaru tried to convince a waiter, who had never heard of Eminescu, that he should hang himself. A "child enamored with risky games", he annoyed his roommates by returning to theft, and once absconded with Morariu's bibliophile edition of Molière. The two objects always found on his person were a scalpel, which he used for self-defense, and a wooden "mushroom", for darning his socks. He was eventually forced out by Morariu, after an "inconsiderate gesture" on Stelaru's part. Around 1954, Stelaru had joined an informal "literary circle" of social drinkers, which included Ion Vlad, poet Tiberiu Iliescu, actor Ludovic Antal, journalist Emil Serghie, philosopher Sorin Pavel, and, more marginally, Pandrea. The divorce from Despina was pronounced final in May 1955, when Stelaru married painter Rodica Pandele. They lived together in Bucharest until mid-1960, when Stelaru moved back in with his mother's family in Turnu Măgurele; his second divorce was recorded in May 1961.

Stelaru still declined to publish adult literature under the guidelines imposed by Socialist Realism; he only wrote short dramatic poems which at the time were classified as children's literature, beginning with a "lyrical fairy tale", Fata pădurarului ("The Forester's Daughter", 1955). He followed up in August 1956 with Gelu, a rhyming epic which borrowed heavily from Romanian folklore; its originality was in personifying Time itself as a major figure of the narrative, as Ciobdestea ("Star-fragment"). According to reviewer Gloria Barna: "children cannot but love this story, a real accomplishment for the author." Two children's plays appeared together in 1957, as Șarpele Marao; Vrăjitoarele ("Marao the Snake; The Witches"). Depicting love stories in the language of folk mythology, it was lambasted by critic H. Fabian in November 1957. Fabian found it to be "below what is required", unappealing, and written as "some sort of rhyming prose." A more lenient review was published by Al. Andriescu, who criticized the pieces for being "somewhat arid", doubting that they could ever be used for a theatrical production. Andriescu also described Vrăjitoarele as more folkloric than Șarpele Marao, seeing the latter as somewhat tributary to a "very natural bookish contamination", including from Goethe's Faust. In a 2009 reappraisal, scholar Veronica-Alina Constănceanu noted that Stelaru's text was "clear, simple, leaving no problems for interpretation", and with only a few nods to theatrical modernity.

Stelaru had proposed another book of rhyming stories, called Leru, but in November 1957 the Agitprop Directorate picked up on details which seemingly mocked the regime, and advised against its publication. In 1958, he earned more unwanted attention from the political establishment, and was attacked for his alleged anti-communism in two official magazines—Gazeta Literară and Lupta de Clasă. Formally unemployed throughout his stay in Turnu Măgurele (which lasted to 1965), Stelaru was isolated from the professional community, only receiving letters from Corlaciu and painter Ioan Mirea; he was also legally barred from obtaining a ration book. From 1961, he was in a relationship with Anghelina Cioacă, a custodian of the local Sfânta Vineri Church. During that year, he returned to print in a USR journal, Luceafărul, beginning with a reportage about the Romanian Black Sea resorts. It attracted positive attention from a reviewer for Contemporanul, who noted that Stelaru had managed to craft "an original way of describing things that are largely known from the press." Luceafărul's June issue also featured one of his poems—it "sketched from the quiet, transparent and multicolored sunset, to evoke the joy of a metalworker upon entering in his new home." In July, he spent a few days at a rice farm on the Olt.

Stelaru only returned more fully to his older literary canons in April 1963, when Oameni și flăcări ("Men and Flames") appeared. As read by Sarău, this volume "gave the impression of being tributary to the doctrines of that age." Stoica also recounts that, during his Armenească year, Stelaru had adapted his themes (though not also his style) to the requirements of "anti-fascist" poetry, discovering himself as a "proletarian intellectual". This change did not prevent him from going unpublished at a time when "others, pygmies next to his great talent, had grown into maestros who were obligatory references in all-level textbooks." In sharp contrast to his interwar bohemianism, Oameni și flăcări included odes to the miners, anti-war pieces, and a title poem about the Grivița strike of 1933. In his reception of Oameni și flăcări, communist poet Camil Baltazar noted that Stelaru was confiding his "somber" style to describing Romania's capitalist past, while seeking to find an optimistic tone for the "luminous present", though still lacking definition and concision.

=== Final return ===
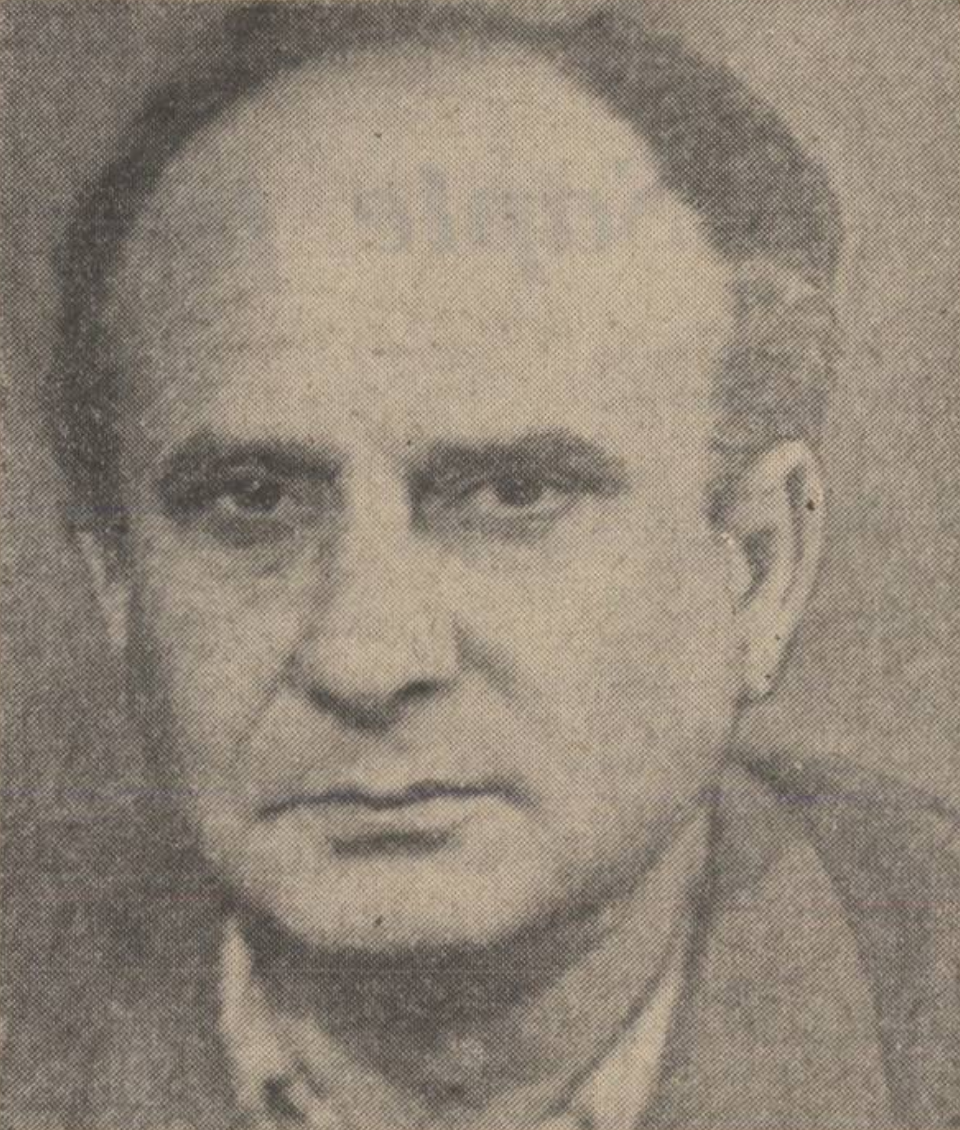
Stelaru's final photograph, 1971

By June 1964, Stelaru had sent one of his manuscripts for review at Editura pentru Literatură, though he complained that the staff there, including Mihai Gafița, were ignoring him. By September, he had been rehabilitated, and married Anghelina at the USR chalet in Sinaia. Their boy, Vlad Eunor (nicknamed "Norișor", or "Tiny Cloud"), was born in January 1965. The three moved to Buftea, in a small house originally owned by Ion Vlad, who was their godfather; they continued to live there until October 1968. Stelaru's subsequent recovery included being published in Steaua, where he was promoted by Stoica, as well as in Gazeta Literară, Tribuna, and the Pioneer Organization's central magazine, Cutezătorii. As argued by Sarău, such reassessment was also facilitated by the USR's directorial team, which included Stancu and Marin Preda—both of whom were natives of Teleorman. Stelaru's rehabilitation was made final with the publication of a 1967 short-story collection, Fata fără lună ("A Moonless Girl"). Also appearing in 1967, Mare incognitum, which he conceived as a definitive edition, was hailed as the "most important" document of Stelaru's career; though its near-definitive form had been approximated, under a working title, in 1958, it also includes many new poems. The collection earned Stelaru the USR prize for that year.

Stelaru's return was celebrated by critic Laurențiu Ulici, who ascertained that Stelaru, "feeling that bohemianism as is his one way of existing, seems resigned to his fate, but convinced that he has descended into a swamp." In November 1967, the poet was hospitalized for what he termed as "heart trouble"; in letters he sent to his mother, he noted that he was being looked after by a cabinet minister, and also that he was receiving "French medicine." In 1968, in addition to completing Zeii prind șoareci, he produced a selection of new poems, Nemoarte ("Undeath"). These were welcomed by Barbu in Informația Bucureștiului newspaper: "His lyrics have a thrilling pathos which cannot be rendered banal even by the occasional repetition. [...] A slow, patient swimmer, [...] Stelaru will reach Judgment Day on the true headland of art, whereas others, the award-winners, will have drowned on the way there, dragged down by their own swagger". Interviewed by the younger poet Adrian Păunescu in early 1969, when he was already gravely ill with cirrhosis and collecting disability pension, Stelaru noted the "spiritual liberty" of Romania's literary scene, but expressed his disdain for the Onirists, who, he argued, had "jumped overboard".

From 1968, Stelaru and his family had moved into a high-rise apartment in Berceni, southern Bucharest. As noted by Corlaciu, this was a formal recognition by Romania, and put an end to Stelaru's bohemian career; also then, Stelaru had begun receiving prolonged visits from his daughter Eumene. Stoica reconnected with his mentor at this stage: feeling like a rich man in a "golden palace", and "won over by the charms of family life", Stelaru could now pay for his own upkeep, and could afford prestige goods, such as Pepsi, Pall Mall, and foreign medicine. He was fearful of dying and an insomniac, though he still had not given up drinking. He spent much time with his boy, whom he nicknamed "Nouraș" ("Little Cloud"), nurturing his passion for doodling. A "drawing by Eunor Stelaru" illustrated Dimitrie's selection of poems in a June 1970 issue of România Literară.

As a writer, Stelaru followed up in 1969 with a second print of Mare incognitum (prefaced by Lucian Raicu), and another fairy tale, Cei din lună ("Those of the Moon"); and in 1970 with two more volumes: Înalta umbră ("The Tall Shadow"), and Poeme dramatice. Leru ṣi Împăratul Nix ("Dramatic Poems. Leru and Emperor Nix"). The latter was Stelaru's contribution to philosophical drama, and, at least in part, to Absurdist theater, bridging elements from Stelaru's poetry with borrowings from Urmuz, George Ciprian, and Lewis Carroll. In another anthology, Coloane ("Columns", also appearing in 1970), he offered a thematic unity by disregarding the chronological date of publication. During autumn 1970, Stelaru was recovering at the writers' chalet in Călimănești. He was interviewed there by journalist Claudiu Moldovan, to whom he complained that "nothing was left" of bohemian Bucharest and old Turnu Măgurele, and that "we have forgotten Tonegaru". Throughout their meeting, he "showed off" by drinking whiskey, claiming that it had been recommended by doctors as a vasodilator. His living bibliography ended with another selection, Păsări incandescente ("Incandescent Birds"), put out in 1971.

In January 1971, Coloane was reviewed for the anti-communist diaspora by Monica Lovinescu (Eugen's daughter), over Radio Free Europe. She argued that, while Tonegaru, Corlaciu and Dumitrescu had always displayed concern for the future, and prescience about a coming doom, Stelaru was "stuck within his one howl, the one he started with", a "vehement, obsessive, but dimming repetition of his beginnings." As she put it, "Dimitrie Stelaru speaks for all those of his generation who are absenting without leave, who have been crushed and forgotten"; his own place in literary history was ensured by what he had put to paper in his "terrible youth". By November 1971, Stelaru had submitted three more volumes for review at Cartea Românească publishers. These were a memoir, called Doi lei planeta ("Two Lei for the Ticket"), a collection of theatrical plays, Saltimbancul sinistru ("That Sinister Mountebank"), as well as a new version of Preamărirea durerii. Diarist Pericle Martinescu described Doi lei planeta as a highly mendacious book, but noted that such was to be expected of Stelaru, since "the poet never held an ounce of literary conscience."

Stelaru died in Bucharest on 28 November, three days after being visited by Moldovan, to whom he addressed what were probably his last written lines. He was buried among other writers in Bellu cemetery on 1 December. A clerical error assigned him the name "Dimitrie Sterescu", making it impossible to locate his tomb. The following day, România Literară offered a brief overview of his poetic work, arguing that his wartime activity with Albatros and Sburătorul evidenced his "anti-fascist attitude". In that same issue, Caraion mourned his friend as "one of this country's great true poets", adding: "He shall sleep in the insomnia of Romanian literature, in the insomnia that is restlessness and a 'timeless king'." As he noted, Stelaru had never been translated into any foreign language.

== Legacy ==
Stelaru preserved his posthumous fame in Romanian literary circles. Martin, who delivered Stelaru's funeral oration, believes that he was an "occasional guru" to the younger Nichita Stănescu, whose own poetry is similarly tapped into a "bohemianism of the spiritual elites." As noted by literary scholar Victor Corcheș, his legacy was otherwise tarnished: "like other men of letters, I once fell victim to a prejudice that saw [Stelaru] the poet as an angel, and the man as a demon! As such, I admired and read the former, while condemning and avoiding the latter! It was much later that I realized [...] that his existence as a man, lavishly peppered with dramatic or hilarious facts of life, was sublimated by his literary output, with his social avatars blending into a spiritual creation."

As reported the in 1972 by journalist Ion Lazăr, few people in Segarcea-Vale so much as remembered Stelaru. Among those he interviewed was a cousin, Ion Popescu, who was a technician at the local collective farm, and who quipped that Stelaru had once "died and was then resurrected". The USR was involved in commemorating Stelaru, beginning in 1975 with a formal ceremony in Segarcea-Vale—noted guests included Corlaciu and Nicolae Dragoș. However, at around the same time, Viața Românească was not allowed to publish some of his manuscript poems, described by censors as too "intimist". One such work, taken up by that magazine in 1990, speaks about shadows as poetic peronas:

A purtat coarne de la femei,
dimineața s-a trezit în circiumă
sub umbra picioarelor lui.

Acum nu-l mănînc,
nu-i rup hainele și luna.
Dacă mai trăiește opt zile și două
nu e Stelaru într-una?

Translation:

It was given to wear horns by the women,
it woke up in taverns at daybreak
beneath the shadow cast by his legs.

Now, I shan't eat it,
I shan't tear its clothes and its moon.
But should it live for eight days and two more
won't it become Stelaru, and soon?

As noted in September 1979 by poet Vasile Petre Fati, "the absence of reference books on the exemplary poetry of Emil Botta or Dimitrie Stelaru" had become unforgivable. Stelaru's Culcer fairy tale was first taken up in Vatra magazine in May 1979. This was followed in 1982 by Stoica's book of memoirs, Amintirile unui fost corector, in which his recollections of life with Stelaru "are perhaps the liveliest, infused with the perfume of [Stoica's] age of illusions and with that of the intellectual and artistic bohemia of his day." As Sarău writes, "many years of 'silence' followed" the 1975 ceremony, down to 1984—when a monograph was published by Emil Manu; in the late 1980s, Corcheș and Sarău began researching the lesser-known aspects of the poet's life and work. Stelaru's contribution to children's literature was also being rediscovered: in 1986, Vrăjitoarele was taken up as a scenario by Cristian Pepino and his puppet theater.

The staff of Radio Free Europe continued to regard Stelaru as primarily an anti-communist resistant, but their arguments were challenged from within Romania by a Luceafărul columnist, Artur Silvestri. In 1983, Silvestri argued: "Perhaps one could believe the biography they fabricated for D. Stelaru, who is otherwise an admirable poet, as one of the 'politically persecuted', if it wouldn't be a known fact that the disruption of his life had certainly not begun in 1948, but much earlier." More attention came after the fall of communism in 1989, when Corcheș took up the task of publishing Stelaru's remaining manuscripts. While some finished or unfinished pieces saw print in various literary magazines (România Literară, Manuscriptum, Orizont and Tomis), his children's prose, Casa veverițelor ("House of Squirrels"), appeared in summer 1991 at Editura Ion Creangă; as Corcheș noted at the time, the theatrical works were refused by both Editura Eminescu and Editura Minerva. On Stelaru's centennial, in 2017, a memorial plaque was mounted on his first home in Segarcea-Vale. In 2018, the local village museum opened a permanent exhibit dedicated to Stelaru. An anthology of his "101 poems" was curated and issued by the Romanian Academy in 2020. Pasca Stoicea outlived her son and was still residing in Turnu Măgurele in 1972. Anghelina Petrescu-Stelaru, who helped Corcheș with his research in the 1980s, died at some point before 2010. Stelaru's two children also survived him: Eumene moved to West Germany in 1986, together with her husband and a son, while Vlad Eunor died in December 2015, in Eforie.
