= Ludovic Antal =

Romanian actor (1924–1970)

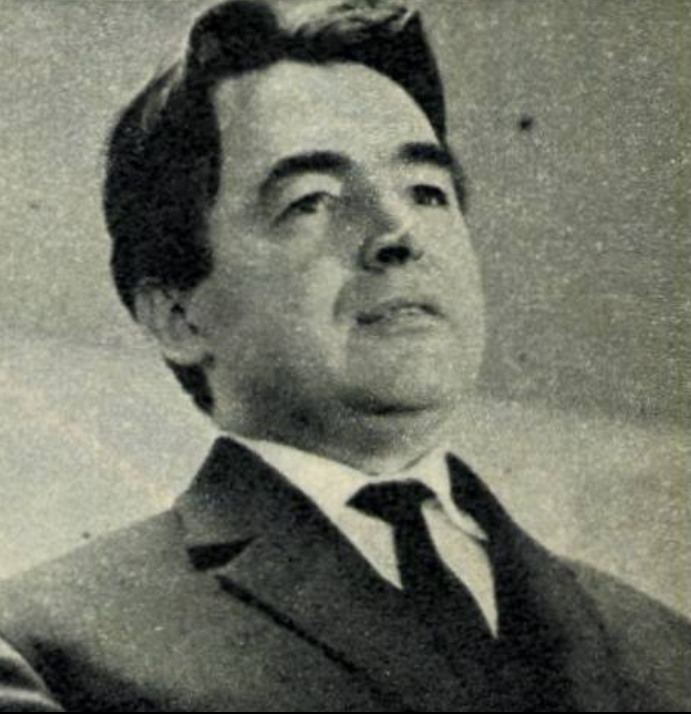
- Antal in 1968
- Born: 18 February 1924; Butea, Iași County, Kingdom of Romania
- Died: October 1970 (aged 46); Bucharest, Socialist Republic of Romania
- Occupations: Actor; cultural promoter; television presenter; priest
- Years active: 1945–1970
- Spouse: Reli Roman (divorced)
- Awards: Meritul Cultural

Ludovic Antal (18 February 1924 – October 1970) was a Romanian actor, primarily noted for his voice acting and his activity as a cultural promoter. Born to Csángó parents in Western Moldavia, he was initially destined for a career as a priest in the Roman Catholic Church, but left to study acting in the late 1940s, graduating from the OMEC conservatoire. After making his stage debut with a workers' theater in Bucharest, Antal attended the National Theatrical Institute in Bucharest. His break and artistic recognition occurred during a time when Romania was under a communist regime, and he took on a number of roles in ideological plays, as well as in the 1951 propaganda film In Our Village. Antal still received poor reviews for his early stage work and voice acting, and was also regarded as politically suspect by the authorities, which accounted for his relative marginalization. He remained under contract with various troupes, and was primarily associated with Nottara Theater, but was generally not cast, or only offered minor parts.

From the early 1960s, the Romanian Radio Company consecrated Antal as one of its main reciters of poems by Mihai Eminescu, a work which made him nationally famous. An occasional presenter for Romania's state television, he toured the country promoting poetry, covering the entirety of national literature—from the early staples of Romanian folklore, through the works of Eminescu and Octavian Goga, and down to modern pieces by Tudor Arghezi, Ion Minulescu, and various others; his activity also covered renditions of prose by Titu Maiorescu, as well as samples of Arghezi's children's literature. Committed to Romanian nationalism, in the mid-to-late 1960s he also provided readings from Eminescu's Doina, testing the limits of communist censorship. His second break in theater came in mid-1969, when he starred in Nottara's critically acclaimed adaptation of Garabet Ibrăileanu's Adela. In early 1970, he was diagnosed with lung cancer; despite undergoing an emergency procedure, he died in October of that year.

== Biography ==
=== Origins and debut ===
Antal was born on 18 February 1924 in Miclăușeni village (part of Butea commune, Iași County). His parents were Csángós (Hungarian Romanians), a fact that was for long only circulated as a rumor among his friends. Antal's brother Valentin traced the paternal clan's roots to the Habsburg monarchy, noting that his ancestors included both Hungarians and Transylvanian Saxons. He reports that the family name was originally Mei-Antal, and later Măi-Antal, before being simplified. A childhood friend of researcher Dumitru Mărtinaș, Valentin fully rejected the latter's theory, which is that Csángós are Magyarized Romanians.

Though it remains unknown if he himself ever learned Hungarian, Ludovic was baptized a Roman Catholic, like the rest of his community. He was originally ordained a priest of the Catholic Church, but left this career to pursue acting. Fellow actor Paul Sava reported in 1973 that they both graduated from OMEC, the "Workers' Conservatoire", in or around 1945. Antal himself recalled that his debut play was Uncle Vanya, taken up by a students' troupe in 1947–1948. By August 1947, he and Sava were employees of the Frimu Workers' Theater on Uranus Hill, appearing together in a production of Charles Méré's La Captive. He enlisted at the Theatrical Institute (now Caragiale National University, UNATC), and, in May 1948, was a celebrated Friar Laurence in its studio rendition of Romeo and Juliet.

At the UNATC, Antal studied under Aura Buzescu, a "great dame of the Romanian stage". His friend, the writer Ben Corlaciu, rated him as a man of "true and refined culture", well above that displayed by other actors; another companion, the poet Geo Dumitrescu, reportedly called Antal a "lover of the muses" (amant al muzelor). It was Buzescu who discovered his abilities in reciting poetry, and she encouraged him to perform at the Eminescu Centennial in 1950, where he took accolades for his variant of "Out of All the Masts". According to his colleague Dionisie Vitcu, Antal excelled in the classical repertoire, and was an outstanding reciter of poetry: "he fit so well into an author's personality, that one would have been tempted over and over again to assume that it was he who had authored the verse in question." Poet Petre Pascu was similarly impressed by Antal's "golden voice" and "outstandingly beautiful physique"; he quotes the senior art historian Petru Comarnescu, who described Antal as being only slightly inferior to the consecrated reciter George Vraca.

=== Rise to fame ===
Antal was for long associated with Nottara Theater of Bucharest, where he made his first appearance as a professional actor—he was Teterev in The Philistines, by Maxim Gorky. He was formally employed by several institutions, initially including the National Theater Bucharest, Giulești Workers' Theatre, and the Film Actors' Studio. His artistic peak coincided with the era of Romanian communism, resulting in more controversial aspects of his career: as noted by Vitcu, Antal agreed to appear in plays honoring Communist-Party activists, and in this "paid his tribute, like all actors did." He was assigned a leading role in Jean Georgescu's 1951 film In Our Village. This work celebrated collective farming practices, with Antal cast as a smallholder engaged in exposing class enemies; according to critic Călin Căliman, it was objectively superior to other productions of day. Antal's official obituary recognized him as having taken on "roles of responsibility from the national and world repertoire", and noted him as a recipient of Meritul Cultural medal. He was frequently employed as a narrator throughout that decade, but, according to columnist Mihai Iacob, his contributions were markedly "theatrical"—until he corrected himself for Nina Behar's documentary on painter Ștefan Luchian (1958). He appeared at Nottara in a March 1957 production of Emmanuel Roblès' Montserrat, but, according to reviewer Radu Popescu, was "superficial and declamatory", "without vocal means".

According to researcher Mihai Ursachi, Antal was for a while detained by the Securitate as a political prisoner. Around 1954, he was flouting communist expectations by joining an informal "literary circle" of social drinkers, which included sculptor Ion Vlad, poets Tiberiu Iliescu and Dimitrie Stelaru, journalist Emil Serghie, philosopher Sorin Pavel, and lawyer-diarist Petre Pandrea. He remained especially close to Stelaru, and reportedly made efforts to promote his poetic works into the mid-1960s. Writer Gheorghe Grigurcu, who met Antal as a youth, recalls that his renditions of poetry were sometimes inspired by his being "gently exalted by alcohol". As recalled by writer and period witness Ion Papuc, his habit of drinking before public appearances harmed his chances as a communist propagandist: once made to perform for a rural show celebrating collectivization, the inebriated Antal forgot the "propaganda poetry" he was supposed to recite, and improvised by performing George Coșbuc's "We Demand Land", which featured a celebration of individual property and roused the peasants to rebellion; as a result, "communist activists fled the room in silence, then ran over the fields", and the collectivization project was effectively curbed in that village.

The Radio Company's homage to Eminescu in March 1961 had Antal and Vraca among the voice actors; the event became an annual tradition, into the 1980s. Overall, he was billed as "the greatest Eminescu reciter". He himself once described Eminescu's lyrical work, much of which he had learned by heart, as the Romanians' version of the Lord's Prayer. As noted by Corlaciu, Antal only picked up solo performances "for almost a quarter of a century" because of "zealots" (habotnici) who had tried to prevent him from acting in regular plays; the scope of his activity went from the ancestral ballad Miorița to fragments from not-yet-published junior poets of the 1960s. Writer Ion Pas asserted that "the poets (and I do mean: all the poets) have found in him an astute reader, a faithful translator, and a popularizer. Perhaps his one true vocation was in allowing poetry to be known and loved by an ever-growing circle of the public". He notes that the main object of Antal's literary passion was Tudor Arghezi, with at least one Arghezi poem featured per recital.

=== Final years ===
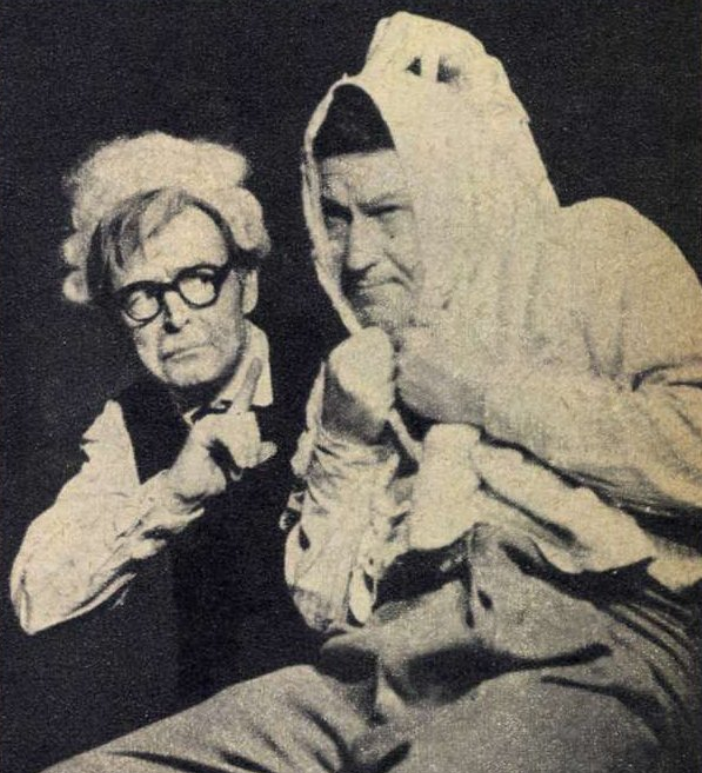
Antal (left) and Sandu Sticlaru in John Mortimer's The Dock Brief, 1965

Antal also compensated for his political roles by embracing Romanian nationalism whenever he could, and, Vitcu recalls, was a "thorn in the side" of official censorship. He made a point of memorizing and reciting Eminescu's Doina, which the Soviet Union had tried to suppress. Antal was allegedly the "first one who dared" to quote from it, and in any case the first one to engage in a public rendition. According to Antal's brother Iosif, his first Doina recital took place at Putna Monastery in 1965. He is known to have taken up the poem in October 1968, at the Eminescu Festival in Ipotești, with Corlaciu noting his "courage and pathos" in delivering his performance. This defiance was more serious in that context, as it came right after the Soviet invasion of Czechoslovakia. Essayist Nicolae Turtureanu, who attended the 1968 festival, recalls that Romanians from the Moldavian Soviet Socialist Republic were also present, and were alarmed by the performance—since the text mentioned traditional Romanian claims to ownership of Bessarabia; they "thought it was [...] some provocation, that they would be investigated, arrested (upon their return to the 'Republic'), and rushed back into their bus".

In the mid-to-late 1960s, Antal made some returns as an ensemble actor, though, as Pas notes, he was self-effacing, took the "most secondary parts", and was therefore unremarked by the public. This view was partly contradicted by Iosif Antal, who argued in 2007 that his brother had been largely banned from the stage after the Doina incident, being forever "consumed by [...] all those great roles he dreamed of, and could have acted in". Under contract with Nottara, in 1965 Ludovic appeared alongside Sandu Sticlaru in John Mortimer's The Dock Brief—as argued by theater critic Mircea Alexandrescu, the play was imperfect, in that the two actors seemed not to have chemistry with each other. Antal had also taken his voice acting to the realm of radio drama on the national station, and was rated by literary scholar Ion Lungu among the "creators of contemporary radio theater". With Toma Caragiu, Elvira Godeanu and Victor Rebengiuc, he recorded a version of Victor Ion Popa's Ciuta ("The Deer"), praised for its originality. Alongside Mitzura Arghezi, he voiced a version of Tudor Arghezi's Book of Toys, which was later sold as a collectible LP by Electrecord.

After 1965, Antal was one of the voice-overs at Teleenciclopedia, the popular-science show on Romania's state television. He also achieved notoriety and much public success with his readings from Octavian Goga, especially later in 1968, which marked Goga's 30th commemoration. This tour took him to Ciucea, where his performance was witnessed by Goga's widow Veturia, as well as by philosopher Ion Petrovici and sculptor Milița Petrașcu. By contrast, Antal's performance at Ion Minulescu's commemoration, in February 1968, was poorly rated by journalist Nicolae Carandino, who saw his interpretation as "too clumsy, too technical" for Minulescu's "easy-going" nature. During those years, at Mărul de aur restaurant, Antal was associating with a group of writers with noted grievances against the communist regime. These included former political prisoners such as Pandrea, Radu Gyr, and Nichifor Crainic, but also the younger author Stelian Tăbăraș. According to the latter, the actor flaunted his nonconformism, reciting from Doina and performing other feats that the older attendees would not.

=== Illness and death ===
In June 1969, Nottara introduced a number of "literary matinees for the youth" with a stage adaptation of Garabet Ibrăileanu's Adela; Antal appeared in it as Doctor Codrescu. Writer George Astaloș praised his acting, with its "delicate discretion", and noted that Antal had long been absenting from the theater. Carandino was also impressed by Antal, one of "our best thespians". He wrote: "this is the first time we see him granted any sort of more significant role. One would be hard-pressed to understand why theater directors, dramaturges, authors alike, have been neglecting to even note that Ludovic Antal was alive these past five years [Carandino's emphasis]."

According to Pascu, Adela was Antal's most memorable stage performance. Also in June 1969, he was a member of the jury, as well as a guest performer, at the Eminescu Days in Botoșani. His career was soon after cut short by disease: in March 1970, after appearing at one of Petrovici's conferences to read out from Titu Maiorescu's articles, he coughed up blood; he was then diagnosed with lung cancer. Bedridden at a hospital in Bucharest that spring, he received an impromptu visit from colleagues Valeriu Moisescu and Vasile Nițulescu, who jumped over the fence to see him. Moisescu recalled: "lit up by this nocturnal visit of ours, he began to recite to us from Eminescu, in a whispering voice."

Around July 1970, while undergoing treatment, Antal was interviewed by Ion Crînguleanu for România Literară. He reported that he felt better, that he had gone out for beer with painter Constantin Piliuță, and that he was considering writing a book. The actor checked himself out of hospital to attend another Goga festival in Ciucea, but returned to undergo surgery. He was then invited by Veturia Goga to recuperate in Ciucea, but was already in serious condition when the letter reached him; the cancer had since metastasized to his bones, causing him "incredible suffering". He finally died that October.

== Legacy ==
Antal was buried at Bellu Cemetery, on 27 October. As Pas reports, the poets of the day proved ungrateful to their deceased friend, as only Corlaciu, Grigore Hagiu and Ion Horea took time to write their respective homages. Their tribute was replicated in painting by Iacob Lazăr, with the 1971 canvass Homage to Ludovic Antal. Antal had owned an "immense library of poems", "larger than that of a county". His implicit activity as a cultural promoter had made him a collector of manuscripts and autographs, and, according to Corlaciu, his dying wish was for these to be preserved by the Romanian Academy.

Antal had had a long string of romantic relationships. The last one of these was with a saleswoman for the national lottery; she inherited his distinctive wardrobe, which she then distributed among other men in her life (causing Antal's friends to startle whenever they chanced upon such cases). His surviving family included his one-time wife, Reli Roman, as well as his brothers Valentin and Iosif. The former lived as a peasant in Butea until defecting to Austria around 1980; it was here that he published his family's genealogy. In 2005, Iosif Antal joined other citizens of Butea in recognizing Ludovic Antal's contribution with a commemorative festival at the local house of culture; here, a "Ludovic Antal Hall" had already been established. Another such ceremony was held in December 2007, by which time the house of culture was home to an Antal-themed exhibit. Commenting in 2008, poet Valeriu Birlan assessed that Antal's memory had been "under a cloud" (într-un con de umbră), and reported not being able to pinpoint his date of birth; he himself recorded Antal's death as having occurred in 1971.
