= Ben Corlaciu =

Romanian poet

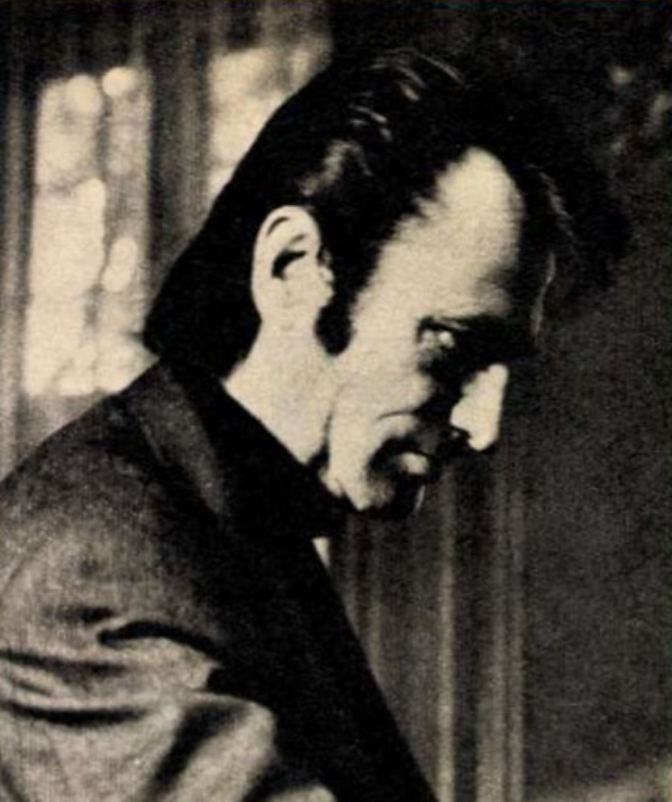
Corlaciu receiving the Romanian Writers' Union prize for his Starea de urgență, June 1973

Benedict Corlaciu (March 6, 1924–June 16, 1981) was a Romanian poet and prose writer.

Born in Galați, his parents were Neculai Corlaciu and his wife Rozalia. After attending primary and high school in Bucharest, he graduated from the literature and philosophy faculty of the University of Bucharest in 1947. He was a proofreader for Timpul newspaper; an editor at Frontul plugarilor and Flacăra; a cultural officer at the Bucharest Writers' House (1965–1968); and coordinator of the literary almanac edited by the Romanian Writers' Union (1968–1970). In 1975, he emigrated from Romania and settled in Paris, where he died several years later. As a result of his departure, the communist regime banned his works and removed his name from literary dictionaries and histories.

In 1941, Corlaciu entered the circle surrounding Albatros magazine, together with Geo Dumitrescu and Dinu Pillat; in 1944, he joined the Romanian Writers' Society. He made his published debut in Albatros, and also contributed to Vremea, Timpul and Revista Fundațiilor Regale. His first volume of poetry was the 1941 Tavernale, followed by Pelerinul serilor (1942), Arhipelag (1943), and Manifest liric (1945; Editura Forum Prize). These were typical for the World War II generation, marked by a spectacular attitude of revolt, with avant-garde echoes, but also marked by the symbolism of George Bacovia. The romantic pose of damnation, the social revolt and ironic fantasy grouped him with generational colleagues Dumitrescu, Dimitrie Stelaru, Constant Tonegaru, and Ion Caraion. He next published poetry in 1969, with the anthology Poezii. This included not only the earlier work but also an ample section called Postumele and covering 1945–1967; the latter show a retreat from the manifesto poem and an evolution toward more interior forms of lyricism. Poeme florivore (1972) marks a return to the earlier style of poetry. His intended title, Explozia sertar, was censored, but allowed to appear in the massive anthology Starea de urgență, also from 1972. His last poetry book was Arcul biologic (1974).

He published the novel Moartea lângă cer (1946). During the socialist realist period, this was followed by short stories and reportages that conformed to the era's dictates: La trântă cu munții, 1949; Candidatul, 1950; Timpii de aur, 1951; Pâinea păcii, 1951; Noaptea de la Ipotești. Două episoade, 1957. He later published two other novels: Cazul doctor Udrea (1959) and Baritina (1965, republished in 1972 as Când simți că moare vântul).
