= Ioan Mirea =

Romanian painter and graphic artist

Ioan Mirea (1912–1987) was a Romanian painter, graphic artist, and member of the Iron Guard.
