= Marcel Martinet =

French pacifist revolutionary militant and writer

Marcel Martinet (Dijon, 22 August 1887 – Saumur, 18 February 1944) was a French pacifist socialist revolutionary militant and a prolétarian writer.

== Life ==
Martinet, a Communist and pacifist, opposed the First World War from its outset: his antiwar poems Les temps maudits were banned in France during the war, but circulated secretly: helped by Marguerite Rosmer, he sent copies on thin paper to soldiers at the front. La Maison à l'Abri, a novel about the First World War, was runner-up for the Prix Goncourt in 1919. Martinet's poem La Nuit, completed in 1919, was published in 1922 with a preface by Leon Trotsky, whom Martinet had befriended when Trotsky was in Paris. Martinet's series Les Cahiers du Travail [Labour Notebooks] published pamphlets by Victor Serge.

His son was the surgeon Jean-Daniel Martinet.

== Works ==
- Les temps maudits; poèmes, 1914-1918, 1918
- La Maison à l'Abri
- Culture prolétarienne, 1935
- Correspondance croiseé : 1932-1944, Bassac: Plein Chant, 1987.
