= Editura Dacia =

- Founded: 1969
- Headquarters: Cluj-Napoca, Romania

Editura Dacia ('Dacia Publishing House') is a publishing house based in Romania, located on Pavel Chinezul Street 2, Cluj-Napoca. Named after the ancient region of Dacia, it was founded in 1969 by a group of Transylvanian intellectuals, and printed works in Romanian, German and Hungarian.

According to its official site, Editura Dacia advocated cultural and ethnic diversity during Communist Romania, and promoted Romanian culture at a time when it was "harshly tested by the ingratitudes of history."

Editura Dacia issues several thematic collections (Discobolul, Politica, Mundus Imaginalis, Remember, Homo religiosus, Universitaria, Alternative and Athenaeum). It is the recipient of several national awards, including the Romanian Academy prize, the Writers' Union of Romania prize, and the Union of Romanian Visual Artists' award for graphic art and illustration.

The Editura Dacia logo groups the stylized coat of arms of the main Romanian historical regions: Transylvania, Moldavia and Wallachia (see Coat of arms of Transylvania, Flag and coat of arms of Moldavia, Flag and coat of arms of Wallachia). According to its official site, they also represent, through extension, "the interdependency of Romanian spirituality in general and those of Magyars and Germans who have for centuries inhabited Transylvania." In 2007, its slogan was Citesc deci exist (Romanian for "I read, therefore I am").
