= Pericle Martinescu =

Romanian writer and journalist

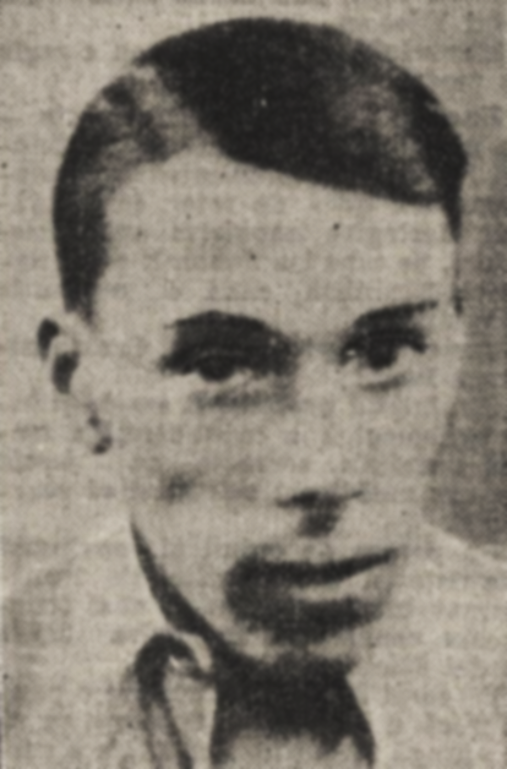
Martinescu in 1936

Pericle Martinescu (Romanian pronunciation: [peˈrikle martiˈnesku]; February 11, 1911 – December 21, 2005) was a Romanian writer and journalist.

Born in Viișoara, Constanța County, he graduated from the Mircea cel Bătrân High School in Constanța. Martinescu studied literature and philosophy at the University of Bucharest. His first poems appeared in Gazeta Transilvaniei, a local magazine. As a student he contributed to Vremea, România Literară, Revista Fundațiilor Regale, Viața Literară, Meșterul Manole, and Dacia Rediviva.

His first novel, Adolescenții din Brașov ("The Brașov Teenagers"), was published in 1936. He also translated numerous works of foreign literature, including Japanese literature.

He was, perhaps, one of the earliest followers of Eugen Lovinescu. He died in Bucharest in 2005, at age 94.

== Published works ==
- Sunt frate cu un fir de iarbă 1941 (poems in prose)
- Costache Negri 1966 (monograph)
- Retrospecții literare 1973 (essays)
- Umbre pe pânza vremii 1985 (memoirs)
- Excursie în Ciclade 1996 (travel account)
