= Geo Dumitrescu =

Romanian poet and translator (1920–2004)

Geo Dumitrescu (born Gheorghe Dumitrescu; May 17, 1920 – September 28, 2004) was a Romanian poet and translator.

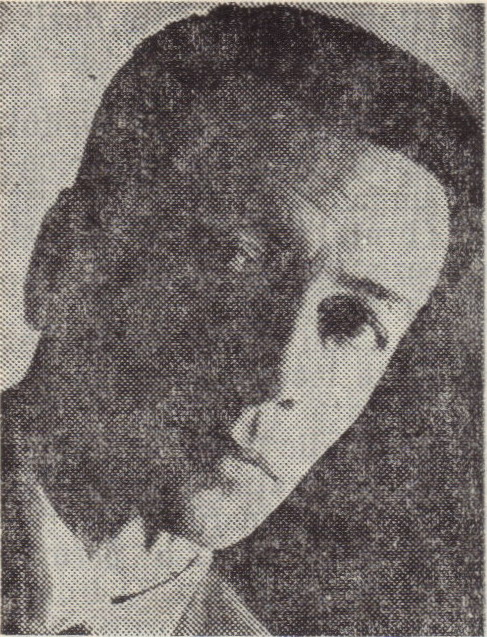
Geo Dumitrescu

Born in Bucharest, his parents were Vasile Oprea (who changed his name to Vasile Dumitrescu), a craftsman and owner of a small shoe store and workshop, and his wife Aurelia (née Buiculescu). From 1930 to 1939, he attended Great Voivode Mihai High School in his native city. From 1939 to 1944, he studied at the literature and philosophy faculty of the University of Bucharest, but did not take his graduating examination. He made his debut in December 1939, with the poem "Cântec", which appeared in Cadran magazine under the pen name Vladimir Ierunca; from 1939 to 1940, he formed part of the circle surrounding the magazine. He started and led Albatros magazine in 1941, and headed a literary group under its name from 1941 to 1943. He also headed Gândul nostru magazine in 1942, but this was shut down by the censors of the Ion Antonescu regime, as was Albatros. His first small book of poetry, Aritmetică, appeared in the pages of the latter magazine in 1941, under the pen name Felix Anadam. He was an editor at Timpul newspaper from 1942 to 1944, at the George Ivașcu-led Vremea, and from 1944 to 1950, at N. D. Cocea's Victoria. He also worked as director of the National Theater Craiova. Publications that ran his work include Prepoem, Tribuna tineretului, Curentul literar, Viața Românească, Revista Fundațiilor Regale, Veac nou, Scânteia tineretului, Tinerețea, Orizont, Tribuna poporului, Meridian and România Liberă.

Under the early communist regime, he was editor and then assistant editor-in-chief of Flacăra magazine from 1947 to 1950; he then headed the Cluj-based Almanahul literar from 1950 to 1952, replacing Miron Radu Paraschivescu. From 1952 to 1953, he edited the Bicaz Zorile socialismului, a newspaper for construction workers; between 1953 and 1954, he held a similar position at Iașul nou. From 1954 to 1963, he contributed to Urzica and to Luceafărul, while at Editura Cartea Rusă, he translated Soviet lyric poetry and helped put together lyric anthologies. From 1958 to 1959, he returned to writing poetry. In 1967, he was named editor-in-chief of Gazeta literară, while from 1968 to 1970, he coordinated the first editions of România Literară. In 1966, he became secretary of Romania's PEN Club. During the late 1960s, he submitted work for Contemporanul, Gazeta literară, Luceafărul, România Literară, Steaua, Tribuna and Viața Românească, and managed a celebrated letters to the editor section that appeared in the first four, as well as in Flacăra.

His second book, Libertatea de a trage cu pușca, appeared thanks to Petru Comarnescu in 1946, although it had been submitted to Editura Prometeu under the title Pelagra in 1943; it was awarded the prize for young writers from Editura Fundațiilor Regale. His following books appeared at substantial intervals: Aventuri lirice (1963), Nevoia de cercuri (1966); his Jurnal de campanie (1974), Africa de sub frunte (1978) and Versuri (1981) are weighty anthologies of his prior work. On the other hand, he was a prolific translator, sometimes in collaboration, of Rafael Alberti, Eduardas Mieželaitis, Romain Gary, Irving Stone and Curzio Malaparte. In 1993, following the Romanian Revolution, he was elected a corresponding member of the Romanian Academy. In 2000, his complete and definitive verse work appeared as Poezii. In 1967 and 1968, he authored an anthology of Romanian translations of Charles Baudelaire's Les Fleurs du mal, in two separate versions. He won the Romanian Writers' Union's prize in 1968 and 1999.
