= Censorship in Communist Romania =

Censorship in Communist Romania occurred during the Socialist Republic in two stages: under the first Communist president Gheorghe Gheorghiu-Dej (1947–1965) and the second and last Communist president Nicolae Ceaușescu (1965–1989).

== Groza government (1945–1947) ==
Petru Groza became the Prime Minister in 1945, and under Soviet occupation, his government started to communize Romania. Citizens' Committees were formed to assist the police, and thus, it was justified for these committees and the police to randomly check people's documents on the street, to search people's home without any notification and to inspect suspicious billeting refugees or Soviet officers. There was also widespread violent repression and abrupt communization of the country in Romania in the context of post-World War II. The supporters of the communist regime labeled the group of opponents as fascists, criminals, or anti-national components under Western interests, and blamed those opponents for destabilizing the country. Groza himself told the British journalists in 1945 that about 90,000 Romanians had been arrested in two months right after he seized the power. Groza also tried to get rid of the final obstacle to complete Soviet domination of Romania: overthrowing the Kingdom of Romania run by King Michael. In the last half of 1947, King Michael was still on the regime while Soviet had so much power on Romanian economy. Though pre-war Romania showed some features of democracy such as a constitution, a parliament, political parties etc., it still had a king and was politically oligarchic. As the King Michael continuously refused to abdicate the throne, Groza threatened him with the civil war. Michael wanted to avoid the bloodshed and he gave in on 30 December 1947, and on that same day, the Romanian People's Republic was declared.

== Under Gheorghe Gheorghiu-Dej (1947–1965) ==
As the Romanian People's Republic was declared, Gheorghe Gheorghiu-Dej became the first president of the country and the Communist politicians, including himself, were eager to establish the foundation of the totalitarian state. As a first step, on 4 February 1948, a Treaty of Friendship, Cooperation and Mutual Assistance between Romania and the Soviet Union was signed. Soviet Union became a more influent power in Romania territory after this treaty was signed and Gheorghe carried out terrifying tasks, all imposed by Soviet Russia. As the communism became widespread in Romania (backed up by the Soviet Union), there was a strong censorship throughout political, economic, and cultural sectors in the Romanian society.

When it comes to the cultural sector, the communist regime of Romania often used party-state propaganda to erase all the symbols and artifacts of the pre-communist era which could have remained in people's mind. The communist party activists started the control of art "to eliminate and erase all traces of the previous configuration" and to dismantle the previous institutional model, etc. The communist Romanian government not only got rid of all the previous institutions and art legacies which were founded in the pre-communist era, but also physically eliminated many actors, musicians, painters etc. As Romania established the Soviet model of communization process, it was taken for granted for authorities to impose "physical (arrests, killings, institutional purges) and psychological repression (terror, corruption, compromise)". In the meantime, the communist Romanian government announced lists of forbidden volumes between 1944 and 1948 along with the lists of forbidden writers. For the institutional level, the last thing Romanian government wanted was intellectuals who could be possible insurgents. Thus, government authorities expelled professors and students from universities and never let them come back again. At the same time, the “Cominform Journal” was published under the Communist Party's supervision and this was delivered all around the world as the journal was published in many languages. Cominform Journal specifically dealt with communism and was used to teach and spread the ideology all over the world and what were the right things to do under communism.

In regards to the political sector, to suppress the prevalent anti-communism and anti-Sovietism at that time, communist regime implemented many censorships everywhere in Romania, e.g. military force was mobilized to dismantle anti-communist movement. The people who were involved in resistance movements were hunted down by the authorities and usually incarcerated. There was religious persecution in Romania when it comes to Greek Catholics. As Romania became part of the communist bloc after World War II, the Romanian Communist Party considered religion as a capitalist remnant, which could make people confused about the country's ideology. Despite this, the Romanian Communist Party still wanted to keep churches as the party thought that religion could be used to mobilize people and thus, to achieve the party's socioeconomic and political goals. Under communism, the church and the Communist party made a contract: the party would not repress the church in exchange for its unconditional supports. However, the church was still not allowed to pursue educational and charitable activities. There was even a patrimonial investigation made by authorities which claims that some people were punished for what their ancestors or kinship did. People could have been prisoned just for having relatives abroad or making a joke against communism. In addition, the Romanian government limited the number of Americans to stay in the country. Though Romania back then had some American ambassadors or politicians in its own territories, the movements of those Americans were severely restricted by the Romanian government. Foreign diplomats were not allowed to travel around the country without special permission or to go near the Black Sea coast. The Romanian government ruthlessly harassed people who had contact with American delegates. The government actually murdered a person, part of the local staff, by pumping too much Sodium pentothal, the truth drug, into her as a punishment for being associated with the American legations.

Speaking of the economic sector, the Soviet Union had taken control of Romania's economy by creating about 20-22 Soviet-Romanian joint companies, including the airline company, the steel mills, the insurance company, road transport, harbors, etc. The Soviets at that time seems to thoroughly dominate the East European area.

Virtually every published document, be it a newspaper article or a book, had to pass the censor's approval. The strictness of the censorship varied with time, the tightest being during the Stalinist era of the 1950s and the loosest during the early period of Nicolae Ceaușescu's rule, which ended with the July Theses.

The purpose of the censorship apparatus was to subordinate all the aspects of the Romanian culture (including literature, history, art and philosophy) to the Communist Party's ideology. All features of the Romanian culture were reinterpreted according to the regime's ideology, and any other interpretations were banned as forms of "bourgeois decadence".

== Under Nicolae Ceaușescu (1965–1989) ==
Under Ceaușescu's second communist Romanian regime, propagandist material was the only available information to the public across the country and even this propagandist material (spread mostly via the national television and the party's newspapers) was controlled by the regime through its methods of sanction. Since the mobilization of the population through written material was almost impossible, unofficial information was going around through gossips. Many foreign movies, music and books were also banned. At the same time, Nicolae Ceaușescu terrorized the population by obliging it to see his and his wife's portrait everywhere: "From pre-kindergarten classrooms to official offices, the walls of every institution in every corner of the country were required to be adorned with photographs of the couple". Ceaușescu purposely destroyed individual privacy. From the mid-80s, due to the austerity policy imposed by Ceaușescu, Romanians had limited access to electricity, heat and water, and also food was scarce.

== Since 1990 ==
Since 1990 state censorship does not officially exist in Romania and attempts by state organizations have been only minor. The only high-profile state action was in the Armagedon scandal, when a citizen was arrested for e-mailing reports that were seen as damaging to then Prime Minister Adrian Năstase's image. The official accusation was spreading of false information, but the accusations have been dropped.
