= List of people from Galați =

This is a list of people from Galați, Romania.

- Florin Abelès (1922–2005), French physicist
- Eugen Aburel (1899–1975), surgeon and obstetrician
- Simon Achikgyozyan (1939–1991), Armenian military commander
- Giulia Anghelescu (born 1984), singer
- Esmeralda Athanasiu-Gardeev (1834–1917), pianist and composer
- Vera Atkins (1908–2000), British intelligence officer
- Max Auschnitt (1888–1957), businessman
- Camil Baciu (1926–2005), journalist and science fiction writer
- Adrian Bejan (born 1948), professor of modern thermodynamics
- Abraham Harry Blank (1879–1971), US theater owner
- Cristian S. Calude (born 1952), New Zealand mathematician
- Alexandra Căpitănescu (born 2003), singer and songwriter
- Nicolae Caranfil (1893–1978), fencer
- Nina Cassian (1924–2014), poet and children's book writer
- Alexandru Cernat (1828–1893), general and politician
- Florin Cernat (born 1980), footballer
- Iordan Chimet (1924–2006), poet and children's writer
- Ileana Cotrubaș (1939–2026), operatic soprano
- Ovid S. Crohmălniceanu (1921–2000), literary critic and science fiction writer
- Dimitrie Cuclin (1885–1978), classical music composer
- Nicolae Dabija (1907–1949), soldier
- Valentin Gheorghiu (1928–2023), classical pianist and composer
- Ilan Gilon (1956–2022), Israeli politician
- Ionel Jora (1921–1950), communist activist
- Sophia Karp (1861–1904), actress and soprano
- Gheorghe Leonida (1892/93–1942), sculptor
- Constantin Levaditi (1874–1953), physician and microbiologist
- Florian Luca (1969–2026), mathematician
- Radu Lupu (1945–2022), pianist
- Virgil Madgearu (1887–1940), economist, sociologist and politician
- Alexandru Mățan (born 1999), footballer
- Joseph Moskowitz (1879–1954), New York restaurateur and cimbalom player
- Răzvan Ochiroșii (born 1989), footballer
- Sybille Pantazzi (1914–1983), librarian, bibliophile and writer
- Ioan Popovici (1857–1956), army general
- Camil Ressu (1880–1962), painter and academic
- Reuven Rubin (1893–1974), painter
- Isaac Jacob Schoenberg (1903–1990), mathematician
- Vasile Șeicaru (born 1951), folk musician
- Mihai Stelescu (1907–1936), political activist
- Constant Tonegaru (1919–1952), poet
- Victor Vâlcovici (1885–1970), mechanician and mathematician
- Gheorghe Zane (1897–1978), economist and historian
