= Emeric Imre =

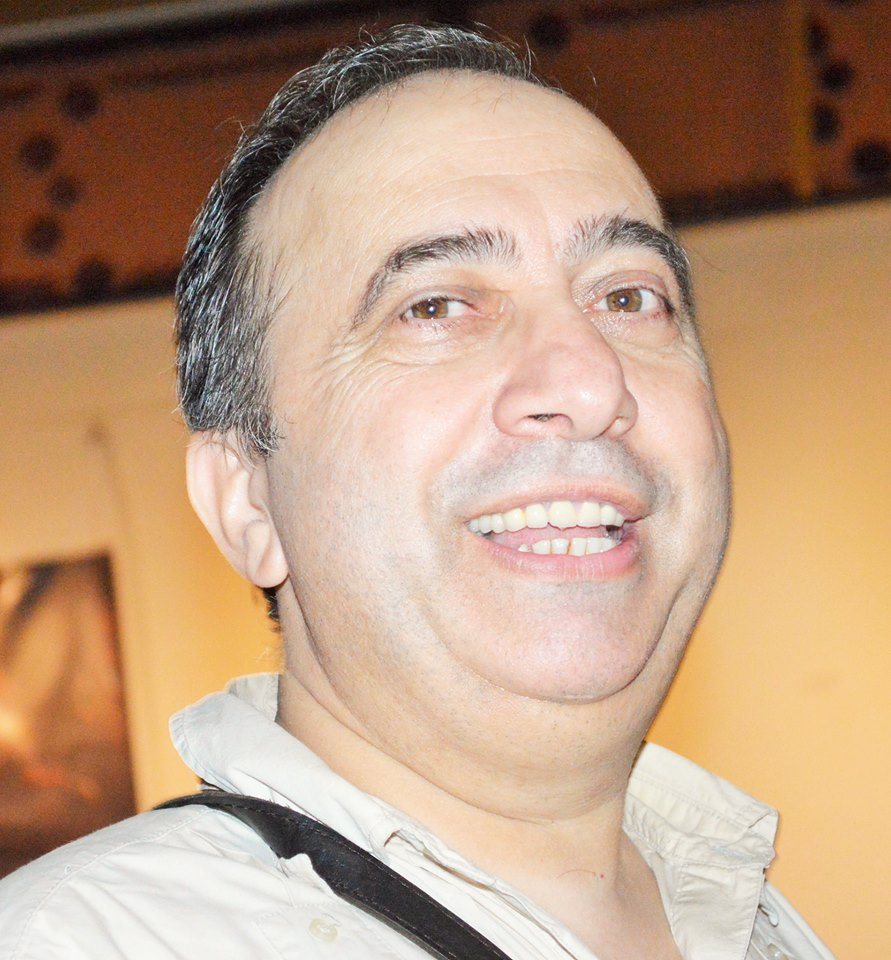

Background information
- Born: 30 January 1965 (age 61); Cluj, Romania
- Genres: Folk; Pop
- Occupations: Musician, composer, vocalist
- Instruments: guitar, violin
- Years active: 1983 – present
- Website: emericimre.ro

Emeric Imre (born 30 January 1965) is a Romanian guitarist, musician, vocalist and composer.

== Biography ==
Emeric Imre was born in 1965 in Cluj in the housing district Dâmbul Rotund. His mother was half Romanian Romani half Polish and his father was a Hungarian Jew.

=== Family ===
During his childhood, he was urged by his father to become a musician, so he began to study the violin. As a young boy, he loved and practiced football for nine years. Emeric often went to training with the violin under his arm. After two years of practicing music, he gave up his musical studies. Leaving the sports career is one of his sorrows.

=== Musical career ===
In 1984 he became part of the folk stage of Cenaclul Flacăra as folk singer until 2000 when Cenaclul Flacăra was disbanded.
After this Emeric Imre fought to promote folk music. Besides participating in events such as the yearly tournament Folk You, he organized folk evenings in Pub Zone located in Cluj-Napoca with some of the main Romanian folk singers such as Dinu Olărașu, Adrian Ivanițchi, Tatiana Stepa, Florin Chilian, Vali Moldovan, Octavian Bud, Emilian Onciu, and Magda Puskas.
Beginning with 2006 he pushed more for his solo career, his own shows and begun to release records.
In 2006 he printed the album Nebun de alb ( English translation White Bishop).
In 2012 he printed the album Târziu ( English translation Late).
In 2014 he launched his winter album named Iarna mea cu ochii mari ( English translation My Winter With Big Eyes). At this album contributed among others Jimi El Laco (Nightlosers), Dorel Vișan, Dumitru Fărcaș, Cornel Udrea, Hollondus J.Zoltanau, Magda Puskas.
In 2018 he released his fourth album, named Jocul vieții ( English translation The game of life).

== Awards ==
During his career, Emeric Imre has received the following awards:

Was nominated for the prize awarded by Radio România:

- "Best folk album" of the year 2012 for the album Târziu.
- "Best folk singer" of the year 2012
- "Best song" of the year 2012 with the song Cântec de final.

== Main musical creations ==
Emeric composed over 260 folk songs. Among those, the most important are:

- Nebun de alb aka. White Bishop lyrics by Adrian Păunescu (2006)
- Bună varianta rea lyrics by Adrian Păunescu
- Orație de nuntă lyrics by Adrian Păunescu
- Noapte de unul singur lyrics by Adrian Păunescu
- Juramânt lyrics by Adrian Păunescu
- Condamnarea la toamnă lyrics by Adrian Păunescu
- Cântec pentru Aurora lyrics by Emeric Imre
- Respirarea aerului de sub aripă pe lyrics by Nichita Stănescu
- Sinuciderea lui Don Juan lyrics by de Ion Minulescu
- Scrisoare suparată lyrics by Viorel Garbaciu
- Cântec de final lyrics by Dorin Tudoran
- Povestea cavalerului cu brici lyrics by Emil Brumaru

== Discography ==
- Nebun de alb (2006)
- Târziu (2012)
- Iarna mea cu ochii mari (2014)
- Jocul vieții (2018)

== Filmography ==
- După un an

== Bibliography ==
- (in Romanian) Today is your birthday: Emeric Imre by Luminița Ciobanu, published in Jurnalul, 30 January 2015
- (in Romanian) Emeric Imre – The regrets and cheers (Bucuriile și tristețile lui) published in Ziar de Cluj, written by Florin Moldovan, 31 July 2015
- (in Romanian) Maximum Folk: An evening of song and poetry in Timișoara (Folk la maxim: seară de muzică și poezie cu Emeric Imre, la) published in Pressalert by Zoltan Varga, 5 February 2014
- (in Romanian) Interviu Emeric Imre – TV show "Altfel" TV channel Antena 1, produced by Dana Turcu, 11 June 2013
- (in Romanian) Emeric Imre, "the White Bishop" on a colorful canvas ("nebun de alb" pe o tablă multicoloră) at Radio Cluj, host Florin Săsărman, 29 October 2015
