= Constant Tonegaru =

Romanian poet and political prisoner

Constant (Constantin) Tonegaru
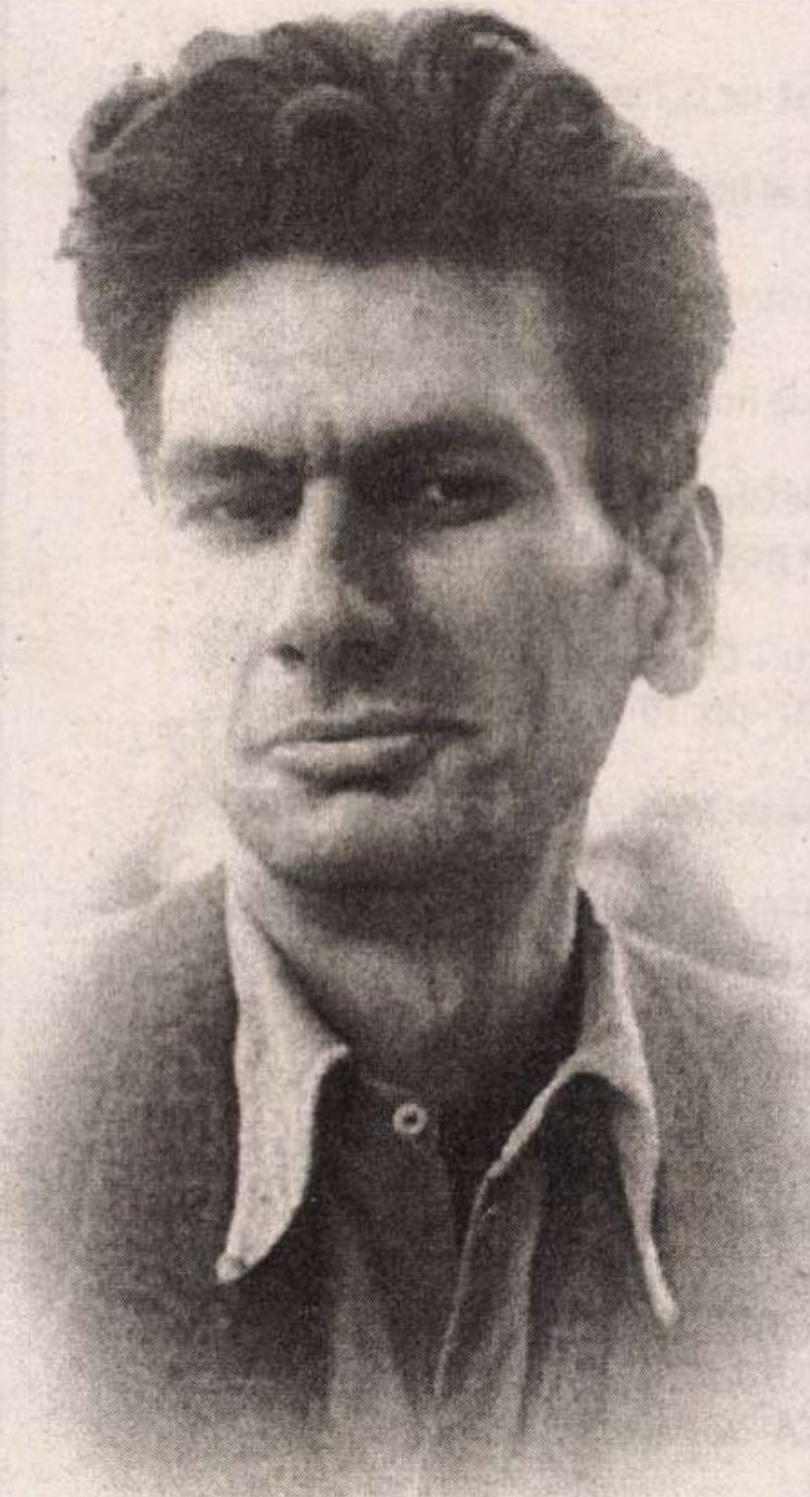
- Born: February 26, 1919; Galați, Kingdom of Romania
- Died: February 10, 1952 (aged 32); Bucharest, Romanian People's Republic
- Resting place: Sfânta Vineri Cemetery, Bucharest
- Occupations: poet, journalist, activist, civil servant
- Writing career
- Period: 1936–1950
- Genre: lyric poetry
- Movements: avant-garde, Decadent movement, Surrealism, Sburătorul, Albatros, Kalende

Constant Tonegaru (common rendition of Constantin Tonegaru; February 26, 1919 – February 10, 1952) was a Romanian avant-garde and Decadent poet, who ended his career as a political prisoner and victim of the communist regime. Known for his bohemianism, he was the author of celebrated escapist and individualist poems, characteristic for the World War II generation in Romanian literature, and closely related to the works of his friends Geo Dumitrescu, Dimitrie Stelaru, and Ion Caraion. Together with them, Tonegaru stands for one of the last waves to pass through Sburătorul, a modernist literary society formed around literary critic Eugen Lovinescu.

At the same time an anti-fascist and anti-communist, Tonegaru participated in culturally subversive activities against the authoritarian Ion Antonescu regime, and contributed to Dumitrescu's Albatros magazine until it was closed down by Antonescu's censorship apparatus. Before 1945, he was also affiliated with Vladimir Streinu's Kalende magazine, and completed work on his volume Plantații ("Plantations"), a large portion of which is dedicated to shocking images of war on the Eastern Front. After the Soviet Union began its occupation of Romania, Tonegaru was also an outspoken critic of cultural persecution, and, with fellow writers Streinu, Pavel Chihaia, and Iordan Chimet, created the Mihai Eminescu Association, a charitable organization and cultural forum whose goal was providing help to marginalized authors.

Implicated in a trial of anti-communist resistance fighters, Constant Tonegaru was sentenced to a two-year term, and sent to Aiud Prison, where the dire living conditions resulted in a severe lung disease. He died soon after his release, and was fully recovered as a poet only after the Romanian Revolution of 1989, largely owing to the care of his friends and confidants Chimet, Chihaia, and Barbu Cioculescu. Tonegaru's biography is often described as symbolic of the fate of his entire generation, which was decimated by communist persecution and prevented from affirming itself culturally.

== Biography ==
=== Early life ===
Born into a middle-class family from the Danube port of Galați, Tonegaru was the son of a lawyer, ship captain and amateur poet, who cultivated his taste for literature and whom he accompanied on sailing trips to Greece, Turkey, and Egypt. Although he was an exceptionally tall man, the young Tonegaru was also plagued with health problems, and was born with mitral stenosis.

He began his education in his native city, graduating primary school in neighboring Brăila, and completed his secondary education in Bucharest, at the Evangelical Lutheran Church High School (1931–1931), at the Saint Sava High School (1932–1935) and ultimately at the Libros School (1935–1936). He debuted as a journalist at the age of 17, when he had several articles published in Nicolae Iorga's Neamul Românesc magazine. His life changed dramatically after his father was convicted for a crime of passion, an event which also left the young Tonegaru in charge of supporting his mother, forcing him into menial employment by the Railway Company. Between 1939 and 1943, he was employed by the Romanian Post, 1st Bucharest Office.

Attracted into the bohemian environment, and having published his debut poem, Nocturnă fluvială ("Riverside Nocturne"), in a 1942 issue of the regional journal Expresul de Brăila, Tonegaru met and befriended poets Stelaru and Cioculescu, while frequenting the modernists at Sburătorul. His work became more experimental, and he came to concentrate on writing poems. Tonegaru also became better known to the public, largely thanks to the appreciation of his work by literary critic Vladimir Streinu, who also helped the poet find employment as a copyist with the Ministry of Education (a job he held between 1943 and 1944). He was by then a popular figure on the literary scene, and, according to literary historian Alex Ștefănescu, loved for "his candor and humor, his awkwardness which always underlined his fundamental honesty". Among the young authors who viewed him with noted sympathy were Pavel Chihaia, Iordan Chimet, Mihail Crama, and Ben Corlaciu. He was also close to actor Tudorel Popa.

=== World War II activism ===
Like Stelaru, Ion Caraion, Geo Dumitrescu and several other young writers, Tonegaru was structurally opposed to nationalism, fascism and militarism, and questioned the wartime dictatorship of Ion Antonescu, as well as its Axis commitment. They worked together on Dumitrescu's rebellious magazine Albatros, which the Antonescu regime banned after a number of issues. Tonegaru also collaborated on Streinu's Kalende, a more conventional magazine published during the war years.

In late 1944, after the pro-Allies August 23 Coup overthrew Antonescu, Tonegaru and Stelaru became dominant figures of a bohemian society centered on restaurants in Gara de Nord area, creating links between them and students of the Bucharest Art Academy. Sculptor Ovidiu Maitec, who was distantly acquainted with members of this circle, recalled: "One of [the poets] was in love with a female colleague of ours. Stories of suicide attempts. We amused ourselves. They would be around for a while, then they would disappear. [...] Back then, bohemianism [...] was the pursuit of liberation, of a splash of sincerity, and not total hypocrisy. Such was the need for bohemianism. Not necessarily that of a marginalized or impoverished type. They thought they were much freer, much more sincere, much more authentic toward their condition, toward their creation. There were charming guys, like Tonegaru or Stelaru, charming by means of their intelligence and spiritual games during nights of drunkenness, during which they would lose themselves, but would communicate."

Following the Soviet Union's occupation of Romania, Constant Tonegaru remained an advocate of freedom, alarmed by communization and the start of political persecution. In 1945, having witnessed the onset of political persecution, he, Chimet and Chihaia set up the Mihai Eminescu Association, which functioned as a charitable organization providing funds for the marginalized anti-communist intellectuals and establishing contacts with the Western Allies. The project also involved Streinu and the French Roman Catholic cleric and Nunciature Secretary Marie-Alype Barral, as well as Todorel Popa's father, scientist Grigore T. Popa. During the same year, Tonegaru received the Young Writers Award presented by Editura Fundațiilor Regale, a prestigious publishing house, and, as a consequence, published his first and only anthumous collection of poetry, Plantații. It carried a dedication to his mentor Streinu.

Tonegaru's activities brought him to the officials' attention. In late 1946, after Grigore T. Popa was forced into hiding, Tonegaru himself became involved in more clandestine activities, by organizing anti-communist gatherings attended or hosted by dissident intellectuals, such as Gheorghe Anghel, Petru Comarnescu, Vladimir Ghika and Dinu Pillat. Suspecting that Tonegaru's home had been placed under surveillance, the Eminescu Association eventually decided to split up and keep activity to a minimum, while providing assistance to the more desperate cases. Soon after the communist regime was established in late 1947-early 1948, the wave of arrests touched members of the group, while Tonegaru continued to expose himself.

=== Imprisonment and death ===
In March 1949, he was arrested by the regime's secret police, the Securitate. The latter discovered his name while investigating the Bucharest connections of the armed resistance movement. Late in 1948, Tonegaru had obtained a Belgian Red Cross parcel for Teohar Mihadaș, a poet and former member of the fascist Iron Guard, who, unbeknown to his benefactor, had passed it on to an anti-communist fighter in his native Bistrița. Caught up in the subsequent Securitate clampdown, Mihadaș was tortured until he implicated his connections. According to one account, the Securitate officers storming into Tonegaru's house treated him like a ringleader, and, having misinterpreted a piece of paper on which the poet had sketched out a piece titled Pistolul lui Werther ("Werther's Gun"), pressed him to hand in his weapons, and repeatedly beat him with a crop.

Once taken to prison in Bistrița, Constant Tonegaru was assigned to Securitate officer Viorel Gligor, who included him in the same lot as some 75 people, all of whom were already subject to beatings and forced to confess their belonging to an anti-communist "White Guard" that aimed to bring back the deposed King Michael I. Accused of "feeding the bandits", Tonegaru had already been implicated by Mihadaș, and was therefore largely spared violence, but was forced to spend his detention term in a cold cell, where he could only sleep on a cement bed. He was held without trial for the following eight months, which was in violation of even the restrictive legislation passed by the communist lawmakers. The Eminescu Association in its entirety was condemned by the Securitate, who deemed it "a group of saboteurs and spies serving the Vatican and other foreign powers", while Tonegaru himself was officially charged with "conspiracy against state security". Once their implication in the Association's activities was suspected by the secret policemen, both Chihaia and Chimet were forced out of professional life, and spent the following decade on the margin of society. According to literary critic Paul Cernat, Tonegaru's resistance to violent interrogation saved their lives.

Late in 1949, he was tried in Cluj and sentenced to two years' imprisonment, which was reportedly a lighter sentence than expected. During the procedures, Tonegaru ridiculed the charges brought against him, addressing to his judge Zeno Barbu a promise that "in the future [Tonegaru] will strive to avoid the country's mountainous areas and will do most of his traveling in the fields." Tonegaru and his co-defendants were chained and taken to Aiud Prison, a facility housing much of Romania's former political and social elite. Using an adapted version of the Morse code which he would bang on the walls, Tonegaru soon found out that he shared confinement with writers and former dignitaries of the wartime dictatorships (Alexandru Constant, Nichifor Crainic, Radu Gyr, and Mircea Vulcănescu), with sociologist and Iron Guard activist Ernest Bernea, and with the National Peasant Party's Ghiță Popp.

Ill-fed and exposed to the cold climate, Tonegaru found adjusting to the regimen impossible, and eventually fell ill with a lung disease marked by severe bouts of hemoptysis. His mother made repeated attempts to have her son pardoned, but did not receive a favorable reply. Confronted with his disease, and unwilling to be seen as responsible for his death, the prison officials reconsidered their plans to extend the term of his sentence as an "administrative penalty", and allowed Tonegaru to go free. The poet died soon after, as a result of complications, and was buried in Bucharest's Sfânta Vineri Cemetery. Modern Romanian critic Ioan Stanomir mentions a "final humiliation" to which the regime exposed Tonegaru, one originally recounted by Chihaia, who was present at the funeral: the poet's body decomposed in his house during the four or five days it took Bucharest City Hall to allocate a casket, and the one it eventually sent was significantly shorter than required.

== Work ==
=== Context and generic traits ===
Constant Tonegaru, his friend Stelaru, Geo Dumitrescu, and Ion Caraion are seen as the main representatives of the World War II generation in Romanian literature. According to literary critic Daniel Cristea-Enache, these writers "first look on wide-eyed as the old world is being dissolved by the Second World War [...]; after which they similarly notice, at their own expense, the birth of a new communized world, with other prisons, forms of censorship and ideological command." Historian Keith Hitchins notes the writers' connection to the "inter-war effervescence [through] individualism and aesthetics". This he contrasts with communist-endorsed "conformity", but also with the verse of ideological rival Mihai Beniuc, whom he sees as the one "authentic and refined poetic temperament" among the Socialist Realists of the late 1940s. The young bohemian poets were all influenced by Symbolism, from its French forerunners Arthur Rimbaud and Paul Verlaine to the George Bacovia, the last doyen of Romania's Symbolist movement. Their approach to literature was one of several distinctly new but short-lived trends, standing alongside the new generation Surrealists (Gherasim Luca, Gellu Naum, Paul Păun, Virgil Teodorescu, Dolfi Trost) and the Sibiu Literary Circle, as well as the left-wing writers at Orizont review (Vladimir Colin and Nina Cassian among them).

A main characteristic of Constant Tonegaru's style is its imaginative escapism, which has led essayist Ion Vartic to describe him as a "Peer Gynt of poetry". Hitchins sees the poet as being "absorbed by his own feelings and perceptions of the world". Defining Tonegaru's tendencies as "romantic and anarchic", and the poet himself as "a celebrator of Bohemia who advocated the absolute freedom of the artist", he noted that the poems Tonegaru produced were designed "to be deciphered, to be read over and over in order to grasp [their] meaning."

As part of an effort to discern Tonegaru's poetic themes, critic Daniel Vighi suggests that, at the core, there is a struggle between the banality of existence, depicted in Surrealist touches, and a poetic elation in the classical sense. Vighi detects in this the influence of Romania's avant-garde herald Urmuz. Cristea-Enache also writes: "[Tonegaru's] poetry, with a strong imaginative tone, with its decompression and the spread of creative fantasy, acts [...] as a compensation factor. The author erases the borders and contours of reality, becomes a character of his own discourse and tirelessly balances between various areas, eras and identities." In this context, Cristea-Enache argues, Tonegaru invents himself as "at once virile and sentimental". Casting himself in historic roles or as a preexisting fictional character, the poet wrote about imagining himself as a troubadour, a French Revolution figure, a Don Quixote, or a Cossack warrior. The Plantații poems included specific self-definitions, such as:

Noaptea caligrafiez curtezanelor epitaful meu de pe ferestre: "Sunt condotierul Tonegaru fără spadă;
mi-am tocit-o ascuțindu-mi ultimul creion
să scriu cum am dat în poezie cu o grenadă." Iată, să-ți aduc de la luptă femurul meu sub balcon
am trecut un fluviu ce-și sună solzii în galop arbitrar
ducând în alte sfere ca pe un călăreț fantastic
armătura mea proletară de var.

Translation:

At night I calligraph my window epitaph for courtesans: "I am condottiero Tonegaru without a sword;
I have blunted it while sharpening my last pencil
to write about how I have aimed a grenade at poetry." See, in order to bring you my femur under the balcony
I passed through a river who chimes its scales in arbitrary gallop
taking into other spheres like a fantastic rider
my proletarian framework of lime.

Another such reference was present in the poem Grădina publică ("The Public Garden"), where Tonegaru, reflecting back on his early life and education in the province, sees his adolescent self from the outside. The perspective is, according to literary critic Ștefan Cazimir, one of "juvenile cynicism" borrowed from Dumitrescu, with a personal note of "provincial melancholy":

Toamna printre pomii anemici trăgeam la fit;
de bună seamă cândva se va fi zis: — Uite, ăsta e Tonegaru, poet decadent;
scrie despre fantome, constelații și alte drăcii,
fără a se ști că la limba română a rămas repetent.

Translation:

In autumn I would play truant by the anemic trees;
it's quite likely someone once said: —Look, there's Tonegaru, the decadent poet;
he writes about ghosts, constellations and other devilries,
but people don't realize he's flunking Romanian Language.

=== Escapism and political symbols ===
The political themes explored by Tonegaru and his bohemian group were underlined by Italian academic Roberto Merlo, who placed their presence in wartime poems in connection with their radical call for aesthetic innovation: "[theirs was] the poetry of revolt, against both the horrors of war and earlier forms of poetry". Similar points were made by local critics such as Constantin Ciopraga and Ioan Stanomir. Discussing the traits common to Tonegaru and his fellow "insurgents", Ciopraga mentions "juvenile revelations, banalities, the pursuits of a generation, in other words the signs of recent traumas". believes that Tonegaru was an "escapist insurgent", and explains his refusal to comply with the Antonescu regime as the source for his revolt against communism, seeing both as a consequence of his moral viewpoints: "the wartime rebelliousness anticipated a radicalization placed under the sign of ethics." According to Hitchins, while Tonegaru "protested against the social and political conditioning to which he had been subjected", his protest too was individualistic, and the poet was "simply not interested in politics and the great social issues of the day."

Much of Plantații comprises early lyric poems in which the setting is Tonegaru's own image of the Eastern Front. Among the best-known is Plantația de cuie ("The Plantation of Nails"), which centers on grotesque imagery which is probably meant to suggest delirium. This is foremost illustrated by concise metaphors such as Luna ca un ficat însângerat ("The Moon like a bloody liver") and obsesia mea din clasa a patra primară: rețeaua de sârmă ghimpată ("my obsession during the fourth grade primary cycle: the barbed wire network"), but also developed in more complex sequences:

măruntaiele caporalului începură să cadă
pe un arhipelag cu nouă irozi
plecați călări la vânătoare cu țeste la oblânc

Translation:

the corporal's entrails started to fall
down on an archipelago with nine irozi
all gone hunt riding with skulls hung at their saddle-bows.

In other pieces, the horrific setting is replaced with other instances of the poet's constant transfer of identities. However, according to Cazimir, the escape "from a mean and hostile ambiance" has "a precarious and provisional character". He illustrates this with a sequence from Ploaia ("The Rain"), where Tonegaru depicts his tramcar reverie, interrupted shortly after by the violent sounds of a road accident. Part of it reads:

Citind ziarul la ora aceasta tardivă de seară pluvială
am aflat despre bătălia din Ucraina ce cuprindea stepa
și m-am văzut ieșind din neguri urmărit de haite de lupi
reamintindu-mi cum pe vremuri am fost hatmanul Mazeppa.

Translation:

While reading the newspaper in this late hour of a rainy evening
I learned about the battle in Ukraine raging on the steppe
and I saw myself emerging from the fog pursued by packs of wolves
reminding myself of how I once was Hetman Mazeppa.

In one of his final poems, composed in prison and preserved by his cellmates, Tonegaru described suffering, death and redemption as lutherie. The poem was titled Stradivarius, and read in part:

Cine a bătut în noapte lucitoare cuie
să-și prindă haina plină de lumină?
Pe apa morții către sursa lină
viori cu gâtul ridicate suie.
Bună dimineața în struna ta — Cine poate înțelege
călătoria cu valuri la subțioară?
Ce lege neștiută vă culege
struna ușoară?

Translation:

Who has beaten the shining nails at nighttime
in order to hang his light-filled coat?
On the river of death toward the calm source
violins with raised necks are climbing.
Good morning on your string—Who could understand
your travel with its armpit waves?
What unknown law shall be plucking
that light string?

== Legacy ==
Censorship and persecution have decisively marked the impact and perception of Constant Tonegaru's generation. The group has been defined as an "unfortunate generation" or a "lost generation". Critics have also drawn a direct comparison between them and Poland's "Generation of Columbuses". According to Hitchins, the rise of a Romanian Socialist Realist school signified that "the creativity represented by a Constant Tonegaru was overwhelmed by a literature often bereft of aesthetic value and intended to promote the social and political goals of the moment." Political developments influenced differently the lives of all three generational heroes. This process was discussed by literary historian Alexandru George, who emphasized that, while Tonegaru's early choice for "freedom and democracy" made him a victim of "horrible sufferings", both Caraion and Dumitrescu adapted themselves to communism. The former, George writes, became an official poet who displayed "extreme ability in traversing the harsh years that followed", while Caraion rejected the communists' "cultural policies", was himself twice subjected to the "terrible rigors of prison", and eventually became "probably the most loathsome Securitate collaborator to have ever been known by the writers' caste."

Nevertheless, Cristea-Enache notes, the general public has since come to see the "mythological" Tonegaru as "a fantasizing poet" and "a tragic character". He was an immediate influence on his slightly younger generation colleague and Sburătorul poet, Mihail Crama and on Chimet's ExiL cycle of poems. Tonegaru is also seen as the mentor of Stelaru, Cioculescu, and Radu Teculescu. With ideological changes within Romanian communism also came more tolerance of Constant Tonegaru's work by the cultural officials. A second volume of works by Tonegaru, titled Steaua Venerii ("The Star of Venus"), was kept in manuscript form by his friend Cioculescu. During a spell of liberalization under the new communist leader Nicolae Ceaușescu, Cioculescu published it, together with all of Tonegaru's known works, in an eponymous 1969 volume (accompanied by Cioculescu's introductory study). Nevertheless, his personality and writings were completely absent from the major dictionaries and anthologies of the 1960s and 1970s, including those edited by Mircea Zaciu and Ilie Constantin. Beginning in the 1980s, with the advent of the Optzeciști generation, Tonegaru was recovered as a cultural model, primarily recognized as such by authors who considered themselves Postmodernists. The Romanian poet's work has had its echoes outside Romania: Tonegaru is the subject of a concretist poem by Brazilian author Manuel Bandeira, titled Homanagem a Tonegaru ("Homage to Tonegaru").

After the Romanian Revolution overthrew communism, Tonegaru's work became the focus of more public attention, and several accounts of his biography were published, including ones by his friends Chihaia and Chimet. In 2003, Cioculescu edited another volume of his friend's selected works, titled after Plantația de cuie. While periodic exhumations in Sfânta Vineri have made tracking down Tonegaru's remains an impossible task, he is honored by the Museum of Romanian Literature with a bust in his likeness, and, on the occasion of his 90th birthday in 2009, was the subject of a special exhibit in his native Galați.
