= Plum brandy =

Plum brandy may refer to:

- Plum Brandy, a painting (circa 1877) by Impressionist painter Édouard Manet
- Plum Brandy Blues, a 1997 album by the Romanian band Nightlosers
- Slivovitz, a European plum spirit
- Țuică, a Romanian plum spirit
