= Gheorghe Ursu =

Romanian writer (1926–1985)

Gheorghe Emil Ursu (known to friends as Babu; July 1, 1926 – November 17, 1985) was a Romanian construction engineer, poet, diarist and dissident. A left-wing activist and avant-garde intellectual who joined the Romanian Communist Party as a youth, he was soon after disillusioned with the Communist regime, and became one of its critics. For most of his life, Gheorghe Ursu was active in cultural circles, and maintained contacts with literary and artistic figures.

Ursu anonymously denounced the policies of Nicolae Ceaușescu, and was kept under surveillance by the country's secret police—the Securitate. A journal in which he recorded his thoughts and opinions was the subject of a denunciation, which eventually led to his arrest. He was beaten to death by cell mates soon after, while in the custody of the Miliția.

Ursu's death was a matter of international scandal and, after the Romanian Revolution of 1989, the subject of an inquiry initially headed by prosecutor Dan Voinea. Much controversy arose over the new authorities' alleged procrastination, before two former officers were sentenced for instigating his murder. A third one was jailed for confiscating his diary, most of which remains lost.

== Biography ==
=== Early life and left-wing activism ===
Ursu was born in the Bessarabian city of Soroca, now in Moldova. His parents, both surgeons, were Vasile Ursu (of Galați) and Margareta (of Măgura Ilvei, Năsăud County). He had a sister, Georgeta (married Berdan). Gheorghe attended primary school in Soroca from 1932 to 1936, and high school there until 1941, when his family moved to Galați. He continued his studies at Vasile Alecsandri High School in Galați, where he graduated in 1945. His maternal grandparents, along with ten other family members (who were Northern Transylvanian Jews) were killed at Auschwitz. Ursu and his wife Sorana had a daughter, Olga (m. Ștefan) and a son, Horia Andrei.

Ursu was a person noted for his left-wing convictions. During World War II, while Romania was allied to the Axis powers (see Romania during World War II), he was involved in anti-fascist activism, as one in a group which also comprised future essayist Iordan Chimet and future science fiction writer Camil Baciu. In parallel, the group cultivated avant-garde literature, and was interested in Surrealists such as Gherasim Luca, Tristan Tzara, and Gellu Naum. According to Ursu's son, both his father and Baciu gravitated toward communism, while Chimet maintained a moderate leftist position, being more suspicious of Soviet policies and alarmed by the Soviet occupation of Romania. Like his father Vasile Ursu and his friend Baciu, the young intellectual imagined communism along Utopian lines.

Gheorghe Ursu joined the Union of Communist Youth in 1944, and became one of its secretaries. From 1945 to 1950, he was a civil engineering student at the Politehnica University of Bucharest, joining the Romanian Communist Party during this time and, together with future physician and historian of medicine Gheorghe Brătescu, editing the pro-communist student magazine Studentul Român. Growing disillusioned with the communist doctrine after 1949, he was repeatedly sanctioned for disobedience and ultimately expelled from the party in 1950.

=== Dissidence ===
It was during his university years that Ursu began keeping a diary, in which he expressed strong criticism of the Communist regime. When Ursu stopped writing, the manuscript comprised 61 notebooks, covering a period of 40 years. From 1950 to 1985 he worked at the Bucharest-based Institute for the Study and Design of Communal Households. He personally designed a large number of lodgings; according to his own estimate, by 1977, 30,000 to 40,000 people were housed in buildings he had planned. The Ursu family moved into the newly developed area of Drumul Taberei.

In 1970, Editura Litera published a volume of his poetry, Mereu Doi ("Always Two"), with a preface by the poet Nina Cassian. In addition to this, he wrote but never published satirical poems targeting Nicolae Ceaușescu's leadership of the country. Reportedly, he deliberately never took the precaution of keeping these hidden, which brought him to the attention of Securitate operatives. Some of his writings ridiculed Communist and nationalist figures associated with Săptămâna magazine (among them Eugen Barbu, Corneliu Vadim Tudor, and Dan Ciachir). During this period, he was close to the filmmaker Mircea Săucan, the composer Anatol Vieru, and the important writers Zaharia Stancu and Geo Bogza (a former Communist who was by then a critic of the regime).

Ursu was placed under surveillance during the 1960s, when he first traveled beyond the Iron Curtain, where he met with prominent anti-communist intellectuals such as Virgil Ierunca and Monica Lovinescu. However, the most important stage of his conflict with the authorities came immediately after the major earthquake of 1977. It was then that, as an engineer, he sent a letter to the West German-based Radio Free Europe, protesting against Romanian construction policies. The anonymous piece was read by Ierunca over four successive broadcasts. Earlier in 1977, Ursu had been one in a commission tasked with consolidating Bucharest's oldest tall structures. At the time, he had witnessed and recorded a meeting of the commission, attended and supervised by Ceaușescu, during which the dictator allegedly ordered all consolidation works to cease, supposedly claiming that they caused panic and could not hope to repair structural faults. In his rendition of the meeting, Ceaușescu is quoted proposing instead solutions involving "concrete and chemical substances" to be tried out. Ursu refused to sign the motion endorsing the new guidelines, which caused a minor scandal. In 1984, he wrote that the meeting had convinced him that Romania's leader was "paranoid".

According to Andrei Ursu, at a later stage his father also considered drafting a protest document which he intended to read inside the Great National Assembly, Communist Romania's formal legislative branch. He continued to travel abroad, visiting various European countries until 1980, when he was no longer given the needed Securitate permission. Ursu was also prevented from publishing his account of the travels. His various writings of the time show that he was conducting his trips while on a very tight budget, and that he occasionally had to rely on the good will of Romanian exiles and distant relatives. His daughter Olga settled in the United States, and her subsequent correspondence with her father was itself a venue for criticism of the regime.

He caused the Communist authorities further irritation after sending numerous protest letters to the Communist Party organ Scînteia and to the magazine Săptămâna, denouncing the leadership for using or condoning opportunism, demagogy, and antisemitism. In one other case, he sent a letter to the Ministry of the Interior, demanding to know why citizens were required to wear a suit and tie when photographed for their identity documents, and stating that it was their right not to.

=== Denunciation, interrogation, and death ===
In 1984, two female subordinates denounced Ursu to the Securitate for his diary. On orders from General Eugen Grigorescu, his home and office were searched and the notebooks seized, along with other manuscripts. Interrogations and an investigation followed, with the Securitate intending to depict him as the head of an anti-government conspiracy. Ursu was allowed some freedom of movement: he took a vacation to 2 Mai, on the Black Sea coast, where he met with Cassian and G. Brătescu. Brătescu recounted that, during the trip, Ursu was avoiding discussions, but discreetly confessed his fears that the Securitate was using his notes to organize a round-up of his friends.

Ursu was arrested on September 21, 1985. The accusation was one of concealing foreign currency: the equivalent of $16 (US dollars) (17 lei at the contemporary official exchange rate) in various denominations was found in his house. His son was also subject to interrogations. After Ursu's diary was confiscated, Cassian, who was visiting the United States, chose not to return to Romania.

Held at the Miliția quarters on Calea Rahovei in Bucharest, Ursu was subjected to repeated violent assaults. On November 17 he was transferred to the Jilava Prison hospital, where he died of peritonitis later that day. His body was released to the family and, after a funeral service, cremated. Several intellectual figures, including Chimet and philosopher Sorin Vieru, attended the ceremony in defiance of continued Securitate surveillance. Also present were G. Brătescu and theater critic Radu Albala, the latter of whom, doubting the official account, raised the possibility that Ursu had been killed by an inmate.

Several relatives expressed suspicions that Gheorghe Ursu was killed because of his refusal to incriminate other literary figures,—in support of this notion, Andrei Ursu quotes his father's Securitate file, which investigated in part "close links with certain writers who, due to their hostile beliefs, are kept under watch by Securitate organs". Ursu's sister claimed such authors included Bogza, Chimet, Cassian, and Albala.

== Legacy and controversies ==
=== Legal case and lost diary ===
Gheorghe Ursu's death, alongside the persecution of Gheorghe Calciu-Dumitreasa, contributed to an international scandal, and, as a direct result of these cases, the United States withdrew Romania's "most favoured nation" status. His killing also outraged members of the intellectual elite. Bogza would thus write: "One could not say of Gheorghe Ursu that which poets generally like to be said about them: that they are great poets. Killing such a person is equivalent to killing the King of Butterflies. It would be appropriate for the whole Romanian culture to stand up and salute Gheorghe Ursu's memory." Brătescu recalled: "Gheorghe Ursu's drama helped me to better understand what world we live in." In her assessment of Ursu's conflict with the regime, University of Ottawa professor Gabriela Blebea Nicolae concluded: "Gheorghe Ursu counts as one of the «martyrs» who make moral values triumph. The lives of all these persons form a bridge supporting the moral values that risk being engulfed by the murky waters of an aberrant political regime of the kind Romanian communism was throughout its history."

In March 1990, after the Romanian Revolution of December 1989 toppled Ceaușescu, an inquiry was opened on the circumstances of his death, after a request was filed by Ursu's sister Georgeta Berdan. It found that Ursu died as a result of injury to the abdomen, caused by the many blows he received. The result incriminated Communist cadres who still had a career as police chiefs after 1989. The supervisor for the inquiry, Dan Voinea, had led the prosecution at Ceaușescu's trial of 1989 (which ended with the Communist leader's execution). Voinea was replaced by Romania's Prosecutor-General soon after the results of his investigations became known. Andrei Ursu, who cited information presented by journalist Petre Mihai Băcanu, indicated that the Romanian Intelligence Service (SRI) was keeping Prosecutor Voinea under close surveillance prior to his reassignment.

Suspicion rose that the post-1989 officials were helping organize a cover-up, in order to protect former Communist structures whose support it needed. Political scientist Stejărel Olaru singled out the SRI as an obstacle in Voinea's way, arguing that this was owed to the survival of Securitate structures within its framework, and accusing the service of hampering access to the archives. In June 1996, Horia Andrei Ursu addressed an open letter to Romanian President Ion Iliescu, asking him to appoint an objective and willing prosecutor in the case. He continued to object to the case's handling after Iliescu was succeeded by Emil Constantinescu, and, in November 2000, entered a hunger strike protesting against the delays. Writing in 1998, historian Vladimir Tismăneanu argued that the Ursu case tested "the very notion of a state of law and the trustworthiness of post-communist justice". He defined Voinea's replacement as "an obedient clerk who did his best to procrastinate." Gheorghe Ursu's cause was taken up by the prominent civil society forum, the Group for Social Dialogue (GDS), who publicized the case and established the Gheorghe Ursu Foundation in his memory.

In July 2003, former police colonels Tudor Stănică and Mihail Creangă were sentenced to 12 years' imprisonment each for having instigated the murder of Gheorghe Ursu. The two were found guilty of deliberately assigning Ursu to a cell where two recidivist and violent common criminals were serving time, and of having prevented their subordinates from intervening when the prisoner was being beaten. Three years earlier, Ursu's cell mate Marian Clită had declared his full responsibility for the murder, and had been sentenced to 20 years in prison (eventually commuted to eight years, of which he served two). Clită's move was seen by Olaru as an attempt to cover up for the officials later sentenced. Stănică and Creangă went into hiding for several months, and turned themselves in only after the Supreme Court reduced their sentences by one year. Their temporary flight and the Supreme Court's decision caused some consternation abroad: in September 2003, Finnish MEP Astrid Thors asked foreign embassies in Bucharest to closely monitor the case.

Outside of the indictments related to the Revolution and pronounced in early 1990, the Ursu trial was the only case in which former Romanian officials were held accountable for a murder committed while in office. Stănică was released in 2004, after it was ruled that he had significant health problems.

In October 2001, SRI, in a press release, announced the existence of 50,000 manuscript pages confiscated before 1989. Among these were 811 pages of Ursu's diary. Ursu's son Andrei is trying to find the diary pages in the archives of the National Council for the Study of Securitate Archives (CNSAS)—in the early 1990s, some of the texts were released by the SRI to be reviewed by GDS president Gabriela Adameșteanu, who published an excerpt of the diary in Revista 22, and who subsequently returned them. The manuscript remains lost. In December 2005, Eugen Grigorescu, by then a SRI general, was sentenced to three years' imprisonment for the disappearance of Ursu's diary. Andrei Ursu also accuses high-ranking officials of having been implicated and never tried for hiding evidence of his father's death—among them Securitate General Iulian Vlad and former Minister of the Interior George Homoștean.

=== Other issues ===
Romanian film director Paul Barbă Neagră, who was an acquaintance of Ursu, repeatedly claimed that the latter had actually been an important collaborator of the Communist regime, whose conflict with the authorities came as a result of personal dissatisfaction. Additional claims he made depicted Ursu as a Securitate operative. Such comments rose controversy, especially after writer and theologian Cristian Bădiliță decided to include them in his 2006 book Tentația mizantropiei ("The Temptation of Misanthropy"). Both Bădiliță and the publisher, Polirom, apologized for the unverified information, and pledged that it would be stricken out of newer editions. Speaking during the same year, Ursu's son argued that Barbă Neagră's accusations were in effect marked by a conflict of ideas between his father and the filmmaker. He opined that Gheorghe Ursu had opposed "fundamentalist Orthodoxism and any other form of mysticism", an attitude which Barbă Neagră allegedly did not approve of. Mircea Săucan also expressed disappointment in relation to Paul Barbă Neagră's allegations, and argued that they were equivalent to "a second killing" of Gheorghe Ursu.

In summer 2007, in an interview with Cotidianul newspaper, Tudor Stănică alleged that Gheorghe Ursu was in fact a Securitate informant, whose mission involved reporting on the exiled dissidents and their activities. Both he and Creangă had previously taken this stand during their trial. Their claim was dismissed by the CNSAS, who noted that it contradicted available data (and in particular the fact that Ursu's alleged patrons had eventually banned him from leaving Communist Romania). Germina Nagit, chair of the CNSAS' Investigation Directorate, stressed that "the notion that anybody going abroad was an informant is a legend." Ursu did in fact author informative notes on the people he contacted abroad, which were subsequently made available to the press, but the CNSAS indicated the Securitate had required such information from any person allowed to travel outside Communist Romania. Upon reviewing the notes, journalists at Cotidianul concluded that the information they provided was mostly trivial, and that Ursu made efforts not to disclose any detail of the conversations he had with his friends.

Gheorghe Ursu's book of travel writings, originally censored by the Securitate, was first published in 1991, as Europa mea ("My Europe"). In 2006–2007, Chimet published two volumes of the correspondence between him, Ursu, and Camil Baciu, under the title Cartea prietenilor mei ("My Friends' Book"). Ursu's life was the subject of a 2007 film, Babu - Cazul Gheorghe Ursu ("Babu - The Gheorghe Ursu Case"). Directed by Cornel Mihalache and featuring recordings of Ursu's voice, it premiered in Sibiu during the events marking the city's selection as the year's European Capital of Culture.
