= Ion Caraion =

Romanian poet and literary critic (1923–1986)

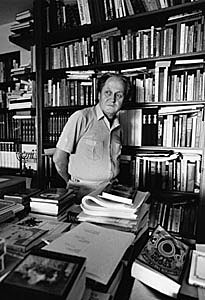
Caraion in exile

Ion Caraion (pen name of Stelian Diaconescu; May 24, 1923 – July 21, 1986) was a Romanian poet, essayist and translator.

Born in Rușavăț, Buzău County, he attended primary school at Râmnicu Sărat from 1930 to 1934, followed by Bogdan Petriceicu Hasdeu High School in Buzău from 1934 to 1942. While there, together with Alexandru Lungu, he edited Zarathustra poetry magazine with his own funds from 1940 to 1941. He entered the literature and philosophy faculty of the University of Bucharest, which he graduated in 1948. His published debut came in 1939, with verses and reviews in Universul literar and Curentul literar. Caraion's first book, the 1943 Panopticum, was followed by two other poetry collections: Omul profilat pe cer (1945) and Cântece negre (1946). An active anti-fascist during World War II, he was an editor at Timpul and Ecoul newspapers.

In 1944, following the Romanian coup d'état and legalization of the Romanian Communist Party, Caraion took part in bringing the party's Scînteia newspaper into the open. At the same time, he was editing secretary for Scînteia tineretului newspaper, but resigned after a few months. In 1945, he assisted George Călinescu in editing Lumea magazine. Together with Virgil Ierunca, he founded Agora magazine, which featured content in five languages. From 1946 to 1947, he managed Caiete de poezie under the aegis of Revista Fundațiilor Regale. From 1944 to 1946, he was press adviser at the Ministry of Arts and Religious Affairs. In 1948, during the final year of its existence, he was an editor at the old Cartea Românească publishing house. For political reasons, he was arrested by the communist regime, and spent eleven years in detention: 1950-1955 and 1958 to 1964. Allegedly sentenced to death in 1958, he passed through the Danube–Black Sea Canal; Jilava, Gherla and Aiud prisons; and the lead mines at Cavnic and Baia Sprie. Literary critic Alex. Leo Șerban observed however that no documentary support for the death sentenced could be found other than Caraion's claims. According to his prison record published by the Institute for the Investigation of Communist Crimes and the Memory of the Romanian Exile, the original sentence in 1958 was imprisonment with hard labour for life and was handed for espionage.

Freed in 1964, Caraion returned to literary activity after a break of nearly two decades, publishing Eseu in 1966 and the retrospective anthology Necunoscutul ferestrelor (1969), which won the Romanian Academy's Mihai Eminescu Prize. Earlier, he had received the Editura Forum Prize for the book Omul profilat pe cer (1945) and the Romanian Writers' Union Prize for his 1968 translation of Edgar Lee Masters' Spoon River Anthology. The numerous poetry books he published in the 1970s placed him at the forefront of contemporary Romanian verse; these included Cârtița și aproapele (1970), Deasupra deasuprelor (1970), Cimitirul de stele (1971), Selene și Pan (1971), Munții de os (1972), Frunzele în Galaad (1973), Poeme (1974), Lacrimi perpendiculare (1978), and Interogarea magilor (1978). His essays are of a very personal nature, and are collected in Duelul cu crinii (1972), Enigmatica noblețe (1974), Pălărierul silabelor (1976), Bacovia. Sfârșitul continuu (1977) and Jurnal (vol. I, 1980). He selected, translated and prefaced several volumes of poetry from abroad: Franco-Provençal (1972), French (vol. I-III, 1974-1976), Canadian (1978) and American (1979). Aside from the tens of authors translated in these anthologies, he also translated and often prefaced the work of Marcel Aymé, Honoré de Balzac, Alexandre Dumas, Sherwood Anderson, Antoine de Saint-Exupéry, Ryunosuke Akutagawa, Anna Akhmatova, Ezra Pound, and Raymond Queneau. He prefaced books by Georg Scherg, Mihail Crama, and Tudor Arghezi.

Caraion was working as an editor at România Literară magazine when, in the summer of 1981, he was forced to emigrate: following a series of "threats and chauvinistic attacks, launched across months on end, at the age of 58 I took the road of exile, with my wife, my child and two suitcases". He settled in Lausanne, where he edited 2 plus 2 magazine in 1983 and Don Quichotte și Correspondances (a poetry and essay collection in six languages, reminiscent of Agora magazine). He also worked for the BBC and wrote for the publications Limite, Le Figaro, PEN Internationale, and Repères (Paris); Dialog (Dietzenbach); Săptămâna müncheneză, Contrapunct and Curentul (Munich); Jalons (Chambourg-sur-Indre); Cuvântul românesc (Sweden); Uomini e libri (Milan); Izvoare and Revista mea (Israel); Gazette de Genève and Tribune de Genève; Journal of the American Romanian Academy of Arts and Sciences; Tribune-dimanche, Écriture and L’Echo sentimental (Switzerland); Le journal des poètes (Belgium); Neue Europe (Luxembourg), and Grandive (New York City). While abroad, he wrote poetry in Romanian and French, essays, literary criticism, and anti-totalitarian social-political pamphlets (Insectele tovarășului Hitler, 1982). In Romania, he was slandered and had invective directed at him (in Săptămîna magazine), while during the same period, his work was commented on and received praise from important contemporary poets. His verses were translated into French and English, and Caraion was paid a posthumous homage at the Sorbonne in 1988. After the Romanian Revolution, his exile work could again be published in his native country, and appeared as Apa de apoi in 1991. A street in Buzău now bears his name.
