= Nancy Dillow =

Canadian art gallery director and museum curator (1928-2021)

- Born: Nancy Elizabeth Robertson; June 26, 1928; Toronto, Ontario, Canada
- Died: March 27, 2021 (aged 92); Toronto, Ontario, Canada
- Spouse: Harry Dillow (m. 1968)
- Awards: Museums Association of Saskatchewan Honorary Lifetime Achievement Award

Nancy Dillow (née Nancy Elizabeth Robertson; June 26, 1928 – March 27, 2021) was a Canadian museum director, curator and writer.

== Early life and education ==
Nancy Elizabeth Robertson was born in Toronto to Fraser Wiliam Robertson (1906–1977), a business writer for The Globe and Mail, and Genevieve Sarah (née Lempke) (1907–1993). Her grandfather was Robert Spelman Robertson (1870–1955), Chief Justice of Ontario. She graduated from St. Clement's School, then took a B.A. in Art and Archaeology, University of Toronto, graduating in 1952.

== Career ==
In 1956, Dillow was hired by the Art Gallery of Ontario (then the Art Gallery of Toronto). She worked first as an assistant in the extension program, receiving a Canada Council grant in 1958 to study educational and curatorial methods in three museums in the U.S. (the Metropolitan Museum of Art in New York, the National Gallery of Art in Washington and the Cleveland Museum of Art). In 1959, she became curator of extension (assistant curator) in charge of the education program and installations and exhibitions organized by the gallery, including a retrospective of Jock Macdonald (1960) and of J. E. H. MacDonald (1966). In 1963, she was appointed head of the extension department, replacing Stewart Bagnani.

=== In Saskatchewan ===
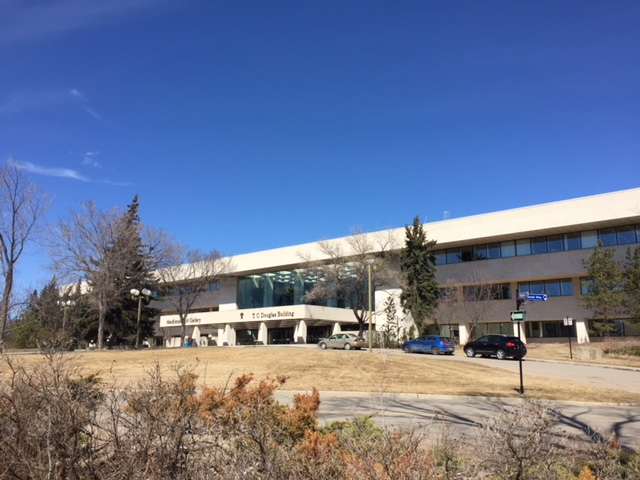
MacKenzie Art Gallery, Regina

Dillow became director of the Norman Mackenzie Art Gallery (now MacKenzie Art Gallery) in Regina, Saskatchewan in February 1967. At the same time, she was appointed a lecturer in art history at the Regina campus. She created exhibitions and catalogues at first working with Robert Welsh, a scholar from University of Toronto; the two organized a show of Piet Mondrian and The Hague School of Painting in 1969. She then concentrated on Saskatchewan artists; in 1971, in combination with Terry Fenton and Wayne Morgan, she developed a show and catalogue of these artists.

In her role as museum director, Dillow researched the attributions of the paintings in the collection of the Norman Mackenzie Gallery and developed an education program. She also helped create a new Outreach program, sending works of art and an educator to explain them to rural Saskatchewan, as well as setting up the Rosemont Centre in southern Regina, later a gallery in its own right. In 1972, she curated an exhibition of eastern Canadian artists at the Edmonton Art Gallery. That year the National Museums of Canada designated the Norman Mackenzie Gallery an associate museum. She served on the University of Regina president's committee on campus art, helping to select artwork for display in the campus buildings.

In 1974 she organized an individual show of Marilyn Levine, who was then living in Regina. Dillow, and the Norman Mackenzie Art Gallery, were accused by several artists that year of ignoring the work of local artists. Four ceramic sculptors from the Regina area boycotted an exhibition intended to show the history of ceramic arts in Regina. Dillow, then in her eighth year as director, admitted the validity of their arguments.

From 1976 to 1978, she served as president of the museums association of Saskatchewan, helping to develop a working relationship with the provincial government. In 1978, Dillow organized a show and wrote a catalogue of the Saskatchewan Arts Board collection. She also developed an exhibit of the work of William Perehudoff as well as one of Victorian Illustrators, which she organized with the help of Sybille Pantazzi at the Art Gallery of Ontario. Also in 1978, she was elected president of the Canadian art museum directors association.

=== In Winnipeg and back to Toronto ===
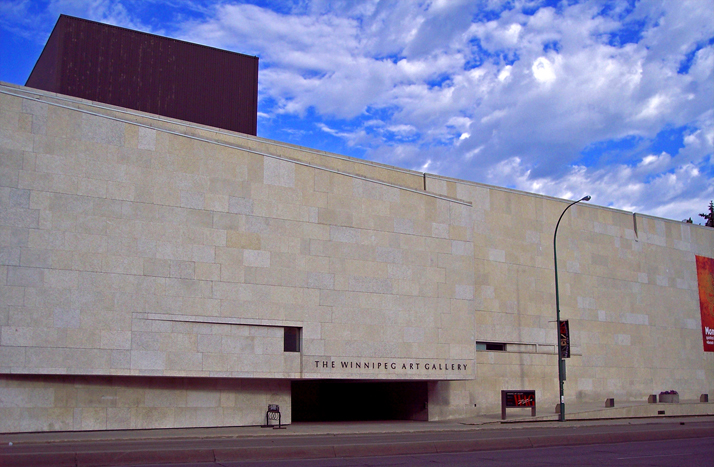
Winnipeg Art Gallery

In 1979, she left the Mackenzie to become the first chief curator of the Winnipeg Art Gallery where she remained till 1984. She was made a Fellow of the Canadian Museum Association in 1981. Each year she put together a show and catalogue on a Winnipeg artist: Ivan Eyre in 1982, Eric Bergman in 1983, and Tony Tascona in 1984; she also wrote a book about Alexander J. Musgrove in 1986.

After Winnipeg, Dillow returned to Toronto. In 1991 she founded an organization for volunteers at the Textile Museum of Canada. As at the Art Gallery of Ontario, she trained the docents, acted as docent co-ordinator, assisted in work at the reception desk for ten years and took part in fund-raising efforts, including the yardage sale (now textile bazaar) which she co-ordinated for about 12 years. In 2008, she was awarded the Ontario Museum Association's Volunteer of the Year award for her service. When Dillow retired in 2017 from her work with Volunteers at the Textile Museum of Canada, Strand News, the organization's newsletter, wrote a feature article about her.

In 2000, she received the Museums Association of Saskatchewan Honorary Lifetime Achievement Award in recognition of her contribution to Saskatchewan.

== Personal life ==
In Regina, she met Harry C. Dillow (1922–2004), a professor at what would later become University of Regina. They married in London in 1968. Nancy Dillow died in Toronto, March 27, 2021.
