= Cenaclul Flacăra =

Cenaclul Flacăra (Romanian for "The Flame Literary Circle") was a cultural and artistic movement in the Socialist Republic of Romania led by poet Adrian Păunescu. Between 1973 and 1985, it organized shows and concerts which, although rebellious in comparison to the official entertainment, promoted Nicolae Ceaușescu's cult of personality and the ideology of National Communism.

Cenaclul Flacăra organized 1,615 shows of music, poetry and dialog throughout the country, having more than 6 million spectators. The spectacles had a strong influence over the Romanians, especially the Romanian youth and spread its own ideology, a mix of left-wing Western-influenced ideas and Romanian nationalism.

== Creation ==
Adrian Păunescu, despite having a famously rebellious attitude towards the political regime in the 1960s, eventually became closer ideologically to then communist head of state Nicolae Ceaușescu. This transformation allowed him to become the editor-in-chief for the cultural magazine Flacăra in 1973, and, in the September of same year, he used the authority from his position to form "Cenaclul Flacăra al Tineretului Revoluționar" (The Flame Literary Circle of the Revolutionary Youth), or Cenaclul Flacăra for short. For several years, Cenaclul Flacăra held regular poetry readings, some of which were recorded and parts of which were broadcast on National TV. The events were initially held on Monday evenings at the Ion Creangă Theatre in Bucharest.

On 18 March 1976, in Bucharest, Cenaclul Flacăra held its first larger scale event. Called "Festivalul Primăverii" (Spring Festival), it was attended by more than 8,000 people. Spectators chanted nationalist slogans throughout the show, including some referring to Bessarabia's annexation by the Soviet Union.

Though similar events were later held throughout the country, "Festivalul Primăverii" marked an important part in the development of Păunescu's career, demonstrating his abilities as an able propagandist to the Communist Party leadership. While the chanting of pro-government, pro-personality cult slogans and other superficially propaganda like activities continued to play a prominent part of events, the music, poetry and other art featured was relatively unrestricted and had little direct outside censorship, when compared to outlets available at the time.

== Shows ==
As events organized by Cenaclul Flacăra grew in popularity, the group began touring Romania, organizing events in various concert halls and soccer stadiums. Shows usually started at around 8pm, and rarely ended before 4am. Many of the performers stayed on and toured together.

All told, some 1,615 events were run, featuring a large number of artists and performers, and some debuted or became popular with its help. Notable performers included Mircea Vintilă, Florian Pittiș, Transsylvania Phoenix, Anda Călugăreanu, Ștefan Hrușcă, Vasile Șeicaru, Victor Socaciu, Doru Stănculescu, Vasile Mardare, Magda Puskas, Emeric Imre, and Tatiana Stepa.

== Ban ==
On 15 June 1985 a Cenaclul Flacăra show was held in Ploiești in a soccer stadium, with an estimated 10,000 people in attendance. Part of the stand collapsed during the show, and panicked spectators attempted to run, causing a stampede which killed at least 5 people (some reports suggested many more, possibly closer to 100) and wounded several more.

Following the accident, investigators into its cause found objects in the stands which were deemed "less than patriotic"; according to writer Norman Manea, items included "bras, vodka bottles, underwear, wine, beer, champagne, more underwear, bras and condoms".

The Ploiești accident led to the end of Păunescu's career, despite the intervention of Nicu Ceaușescu, the son of the General Secretary of the Communist Party (head of state at the time), Nicolae Ceaușescu. Listed amongst the main reasons was the "moral profile" of the participants, which was considered to be far removed from the models that were promoted by the Union of Communist Youth.

== Ongoing performances and Reunion ==
After the fall of the communist government in 1989, some participants in the old performances who were not too far removed from the country, reunited, and performed under the name "Cenaclul Totuși Iubirea" (a play on words, translated roughly as "All Things Considered, Love"). Performances under that name continued, on and off, until at least 2001. An alternative successor group also formed in the early 2000s, occasionally operating under the name "3 ceasuri bune" (Literary Circle Three Good Hours).

A few years of pause for live performances under the banner followed, though publishing of related recorded works continues to the present day. A series of CDs titled Cenaclul Flacăra vol.1-1, published between 2005 and 2008, covers most of the more successful songs.

In a panel discussion broadcast during the evening program for Romanian television station OTV on 20 May 2010, Adrian Păunescu, Radu Pietreanu, and Axinte first publicly mentioned a possible relaunch of Cenaclul Flacăra, and reunion of most of the original artists, later that year.

Despite Păunescu's lack of financial resources and various other setbacks, which led to doubtful public statements from initial backers and other public figures, a reunion (and attempt to relaunch the organization) occurred on 1 August 2010, with a 5-hour-long concert titled Cenaclul Flacăra being included in a larger festival named "Zilele Orașului Năvodari". Performances featured artists from the original festivals and concerts, performing new and old versions of folk songs, many of which had been regularly performed as part of the old Cenaclul Flacăra events. This marked the first public collaboration for many of the artists after more than 25 years apart. The festival was broadcast live on OTV.

Original recordings and covers of the songs continue to get play on national networks, and be referenced in the media, with references often describing Cenaclul Flacăra as "the Romanian Woodstock"
