= Marian Clită =

Marian Clită (born September 1951 in Slobozia) is a Romanian convicted of first degree murder.

== Conviction for murder of dissident Gheorghe Ursu ==
In the late 1990s, Gheorghe Ursu's cellmate Marian Clită had declared his full responsibility for the murder of the dissident, and had been sentenced to 20 years in prison (eventually commuted to eight years, of which he served two).

In July 2003, former police colonels Tudor Stănică and Mihail Creangă were sentenced to 12 years imprisonment each for having instigated the murder of Gheorghe Ursu. The two were found guilty of deliberately assigning Ursu to a cell where two recidivist and violent common criminals were serving time, and of having prevented their subordinates from intervening when the prisoner was being beaten.

Clită's move was seen by the author Stejărel Olaru as an attempt to cover up for the officials later sentenced. Stănică and Creangă went into hiding for several months, and turned themselves in only after the Supreme Court reduced their sentences by one year. Their temporary flight and the Supreme Court's decision caused some consternation abroad: in September 2003, Finnish MEP Astrid Thors asked foreign embassies in Bucharest to closely monitor the case.

== Murder of Vera Vildmyren ==
In February 2011, Clită was convicted of first degree murder of the Norwegian stewardess Vera Vildmyren in a hotel in Denmark. The case drew some international interest after a local police officer commented on the case: "Romanians have no scruples. They will kill you for 100 krones".
