= Iordan Chimet =

Romanian poet and children's writer

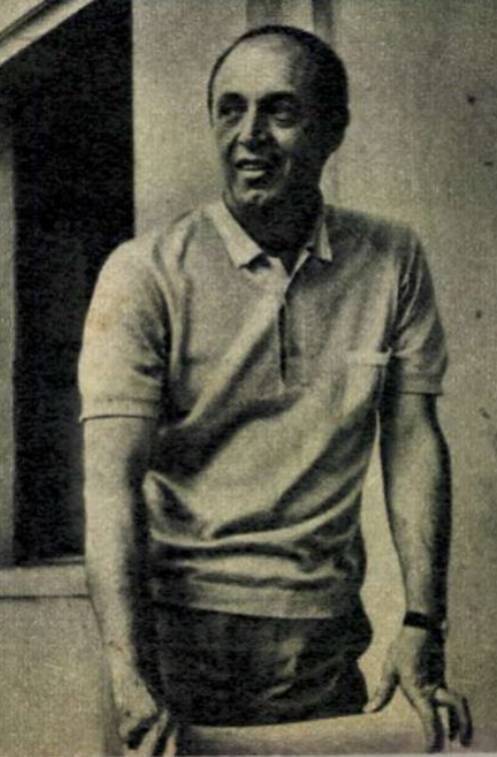
- July 1970 photograph
- Born: November 18, 1924; Galați, Kingdom of Romania
- Died: May 23, 2006 (aged 81); Bucharest, Romania
- Occupations: poet, novelist, essayist, translator, publisher, copywriter
- Writing career
- Period: 1944–1993
- Genres: lyric poetry, free verse, fantasy, fairy tale, children's literature
- Subjects: art criticism, literary criticism, film criticism, biography
- Literary movement: Avant-garde; Surrealism; Onirism

Iordan Chimet (November 18, 1924 – May 23, 2006) was a Romanian poet, children's writer and essayist, whose work was inspired by Surrealism and Onirism. He is also known as a memoirist, theater, art and film critic, book publisher and translator. Chimet, who was an opponent of totalitarianism in general and of the Communist regime in particular, was persecuted by the latter as a dissident, and lived much of his life in obscurity. His experience as an employee of the cooperative society Centrocoop also made him one of the first professional copywriters in his country.

The poems, fantasy works and fairy tales he authored, although largely ignored locally upon being published, have since drawn acclaim for their accomplished style, and are considered by many unique in Romanian literature. They explored the themes of innocence and melancholy, and have themselves been seen as a venue for a discreet advocacy of disobedience. Chimet was also the author of critical essays on Latin American studies and Western or popular culture, and a publisher of anthologies on some of the major themes in Romanian society. In addition, he collected and published material on the life and legacy of playwright Mihail Sebastian, as well as on the history of the Romanian avant-garde.

Chimet had a lifelong friendship with Gheorghe Ursu, a dissident who was killed by the Securitate secret police in 1985, and with science fiction author Camil Baciu. He was also a friend of the German writer Michael Ende and the Greek poet Odysseas Elytis, with whom he kept in touch in spite of the difficulties posed by their living on different sides of the Iron Curtain.

== Biography ==
Born in Galați, Chimet belonged to a family of middle-class intellectuals. His first works of poetry were published by the magazine Vremea when he was still in high school. Politically active while still a teenager during World War II, he was part of an anti-fascist group in his native city. The cell, which opposed Ion Antonescu's rule and Romania's alliance to the Axis powers (see Romania during World War II), also included Ursu and Baciu. The Romanian Kingdom's secret police, Siguranța Statului, had Chimet under surveillance from 1943 until the 1944 Romanian coup d'état. Chimet, unlike his friends, was not drawn into collaboration with the Romanian Communist Party, being apprehensive of communism in general and of Soviet influence in particular.

He was a graduate of the Philology and Philosophy Department (1948), and of the Law Department (1957) of the University of Bucharest. Following the start of Soviet occupation, he was active in supporting writers proscribed by the new authorities and joined a clandestine society to offer them help—known as the Eminescu Association, after Romania's famous 19th century poet Mihai Eminescu, it sought assistance from the Western Allies. Other people involved in this project were the authors Pavel Chihaia, Vladimir Streinu, and Constant Tonegaru (aided by the French Catholic cleric Marie-Alype Barral). According to Chihaia: "We realized, from the very beginning, what the new ideology imposed on us, as an adversary to the traditional culture, to the freedom of thought, attempting to compromise the values in which we believed and which we professed, really meant."

In the years leading up to the Communist regime's establishment, Iordan Chimet published poems with anti-communist undertones (ExiL, "ExiLe") in Revista Fundațiilor Regale and Revista Româno-Americană. At the time, he met the art and literary critic Petru Comarnescu, who helped him publicize his works. Reportedly, Comarnescu proposed his poems for an award, but this was never granted.

Refusing to adapt his style to Socialist realism, Chimet was himself considered a suspect, and lived in extreme poverty during the 1950s. Literary critic Paul Cernat indicated that Chimet was able to evade arrest only because Tonegaru, who had been arrested, did not give in to violent interrogation. Ursu and Baciu were themselves disillusioned with communism after 1949–1950, and broke with the Communist Party around that time.

Chimet was subject to an inquiry for "anti-people activities", and sentenced to work as a lathe operator for a worker cooperative. Soon after, he was moved to what was considered a lower position, that of copy-editor for Centrocoop commercials, an office whose equivalent in capitalist countries was that of copywriter (Chimet was thus one of Romania's first persons to have this job description after World War II). It was in this field that he gained first-hand experience in marketing, which was to prove an important theme in some of his essays.

He was allowed to publish beginning in the late 1960s, with the liberalization coinciding with the early years of Nicolae Ceaușescu's leadership. At the time, Chimet also found employment as a lecturer at the "Friends of Film" club at the Cinemateca film archive, where he kept company with film critics such as Paul Barbăneagră, Tudor Caranfil, Eugen Schileru, and D. I. Suchianu. His works of criticism touched aspects of Western culture that he intended to popularize in Romania: two of them were dedicated, respectively, to the American-born Western genre (Western. Filmele Vestului îndepărtat—"Western. The Films of the Far West") and to the American cinema in general (Eroi, fantome, șoricei—"Heroes, Ghosts, Little Mice"); other works dealt with the visual arts in South America, with Latin American art and Latin American studies. This focus, together with the praise to innocence he provided in his fairy tales and fantasy works, as well as in his 1972 Editura Ion Creangă anthology (Cele 12 luni ale visului. O antologie a inocenței, "The 12 Months of Dreaming. An Anthology of Innocence"), have themselves been seen as signs of resistance through culture.

While his work was ignored at home, it brought Chimet a measure of success abroad. His essays on American culture were generally not distributed in Romania, but were translated in other Eastern bloc countries, where they became appreciated for their subversive undertones. In parallel, his works of children's literature were translated into several languages, and became known in America, as well as in Western and Central Europe, on both sides of the Iron Curtain. He was selected to be part of the jury for the University of Oklahoma's Neustadt International Prize for Literature (the only Romanian to enjoy this appointment), but the communist authorities' hostility prevented him from honoring the request.

Chimet did not cease his contacts with Western writers, and generally appealed to clandestine mail in order to have his messages sent across. In 1977, he began corresponding with Michael Ende, who was living in West Germany. The two shared a rejection for normative control over literature: while Chimet centered his criticism on the cultural guidelines imposed by Ceaușescu (see April Theses), Ende depicted in negative terms the impact of Neorealism and the Marxist aesthetics popularized by Bertold Brecht. The writers never met face to face. Later in life, Chimet was to preface the first Romanian edition of The Neverending Story. He also befriended the celebrated poet Odysseas Elytis, as well as prominent critics of the Communist regime (historian Katherine Verdery and exiled writer Norman Manea) and artists from South and Central American countries. Chimet edited and published Elytis' work in Romania—the resulting volume of collected poetry was deemed by Elytis "the most beautiful book dedicated to my work to have ever been published anywhere in the world."

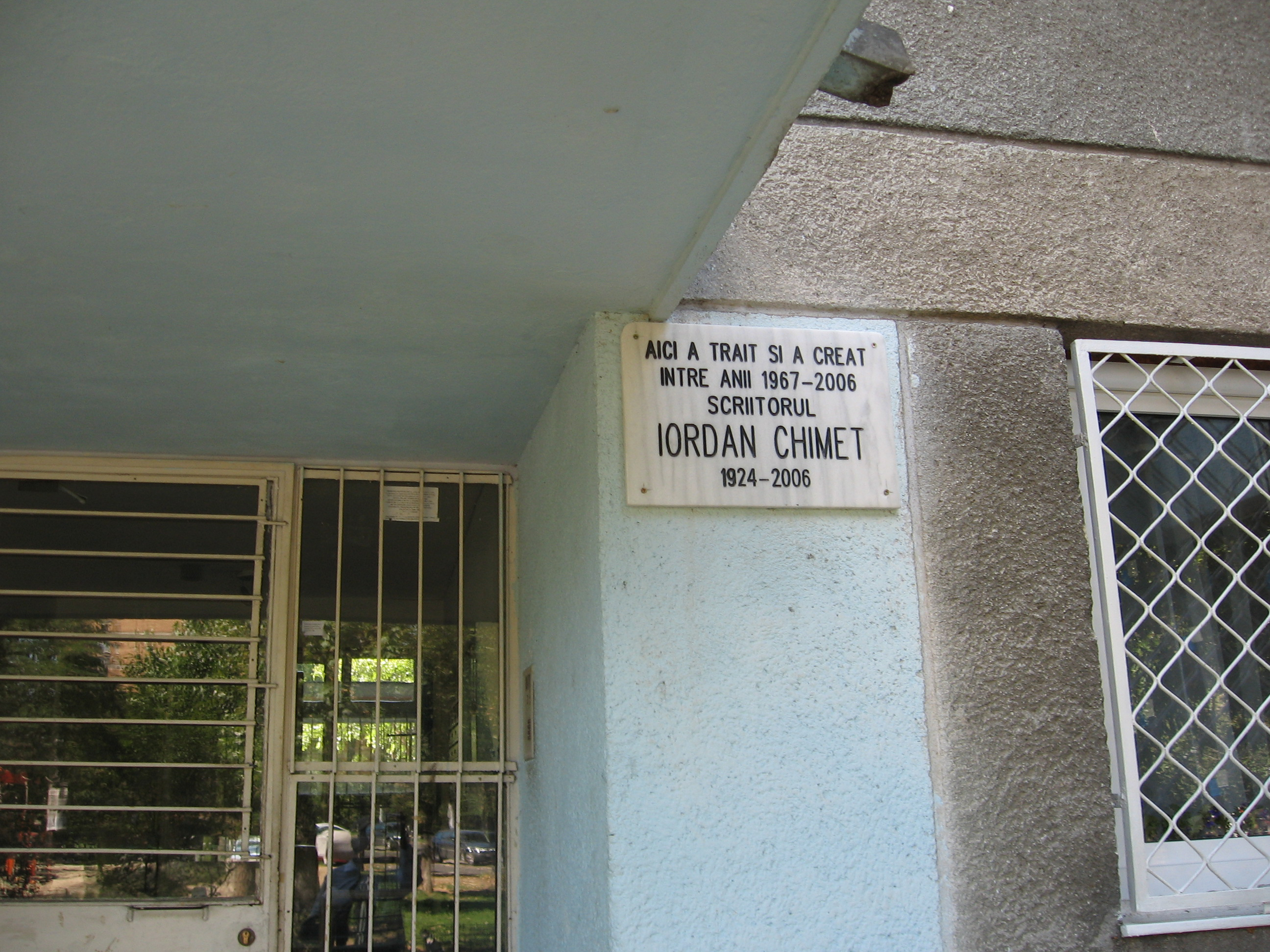
Chimet's memorial plaque in Titan, Bucharest

According to one theory, Gheorghe Ursu's 1985 killing, which was the result of repeated beatings in custody, was the result of Securitate pressures to have him expose some of his writer friends—Chimet's name was cited, alongside those of poets Nina Cassian and Geo Bogza. The same year, Chimet braved ongoing Securitate surveillance and attended Ursu's funeral.

After the Romanian Revolution of 1989, Iordan Chimet centered his efforts on educating the Romanian public in respect to democratic values. In collaboration with the Cluj-Napoca-based publishing company Editura Dacia, he issued a collection of volumes, published under the collective title Ieșirea din labirint ("Exiting The Labyrinth"). It was as part of this that, in 1992–1993, he printed a four-volume dictionary on Romanian identity, Dreptul la memorie ("The Right to a Memory"), and the 1996 anthology called Momentul adevărului ("The Moment of Truth"). The two texts earned Ursu the Gheorghe Ursu Foundation Award for 1997. A member of the Romanian Writers' Union, he was the recipient of its special prize in 2003. In 2004, he published a volume of essays, titled Cele două Europe, cele două Românii ("The Two Europes, The Two Romanias").

For most of his life, Chimet attempted to remain a freelancer, and, despite financial constraints, refused state employment for all but five years of his life. During his final years, despite usually refusing to comment on his incidental career in marketing, Chimet agreed to give lectures on selling technique for a private university—it was one of the first courses of its kind in Romania.

He died in the small apartment he owned, located in the Titan area of Bucharest. His last work, a second volume of collected correspondence, was published posthumously.

== Literary contributions ==
=== Style and literary credo ===
Inspired by Surrealism, Iordan Chimet was a representative of the World War II generation in Romanian literature, and his anti-totalitarianism was placed in connection with his upbringing in a multicultural city. Paul Cernat proposed that Chimet was in may ways similar to members of the Oniric trend—who also mixed subversive messages with imagery inspired by Surrealism—and especially to its representatives Leonid Dimov and Emil Brumaru. Like his friend Gheorghe Ursu, Iordan Chimet cultivated the avant-garde, and was interested in the writings of his predecessors Urmuz, Gherasim Luca and Tristan Tzara, as well as in those of his Surrealist contemporary Gellu Naum. In 1999, he edited one of the first compilations of the Romanian avant-garde, with its title borrowed from Urmuz: Cică niște cronicari, duceau lipsă de șalvari ("It Seems It Did Happen Once, Some Chroniclers Lacked Baggy Pants"). He attempted to replicate the experience of interwar authors, who, as he himself argued, practiced "art as an exercise in admiration, as a statement of love, as a manifestation of the artist's solidarity with beings forgotten by history."

In parallel, his active and determined involvement in cultural resistance has led several authors to liken him to Don Quixote, the hidalgo character crafted by Miguel de Cervantes (see Quixotism). Seen as withdrawn and original, he doubled his political criticism with a vivid interest in topics related to fantasy, including mythology, magic, alchemy and demonology—part of his work as a literary critic involved tracing the influences these had on popular culture and naïve art, as well as in science fiction and other areas of paraliterature. According to his friend, essayist Monica Gheț, Chimet's style was the equivalent of "a mirror held in front of the local art's subconscious in times of need", while his stance was "pure and combative".

In a 1980 book of literary and art criticism, Romanian author and Orthodox hermit Nicolae Steinhardt voiced admiration for Chimet's interpretation of Romanian folklore, both rural and urban, as noted in Chimet's 1976 travel writing volume Baladă pentru vechiul drum ("A Ballad to the Old Road"). Steinhardt sees Chimet's "entire effort" and lifelong message concentrated and explained by the book's title, together with that of Chimet's fairy tale novel Închide ochii și vei vedea Orașul (which translates as "Close Your Eyes and You Will See The Town"). In his interpretation: "Vechiul drum is the road to reality, to nature, to the awareness of people and their age-old, eternal, culture, acute and responsible in the present as well. […] Close your eyes in front of the superficial, in front of retail merchandise, in front of the "in other news" columns and in front of all gadgets which may tempt you, delude you, entice you and fool you, in front of all dissimulation, hasty lies and noisy or shiny glass beads of the county fairs, and you will see the true reality, poetic and perennial, of your space and the people who inhabit it—the underlying structures, the columns, the crowns."

Steinhardt argues that his fellow writer had helped the public make comparisons between the tenets of Surrealism and the natural tendencies in folk art: "The conclusion, I do believe, is unavoidable: surreality exists, only people call it reality. By vesting the most modest of realities with the prestige and the charm of fairy tales and poetry, Chimet invites (and compels) us to admit them as situated at an energetic and incantational level by no means inferior to the most delicate fantasies and the least bound reveries of Surrealism." He adds: "The world reveals itself [to Chimet] in its entirety, in its rich coloring, in the unending complexity of its textures, in the steady and calm rhythm of various activities and contemplations synchronized with the individual's psychosomatic foundations. Nature […], the inanimate world […], even costumes or musical instruments […] evoke in him human activities, while the energies of matter are interpreted in a human sense and joined up with aspirations and sorrows found the human soul." The critic also proposed that such images in Vechiul drum were superior to a separate chapter on film history "from Fantômas to Fellini and Hatari": "No matter how much Iordan Chimet is enchanted by the screen, no matter how contagious his cinemaphile passion may be, it is not in this area that he is truly at ease and worthy of being called a discoverer and unveiler of poetry. He earns these qualifiers mostly when he takes hold […] of a traveler's cane, setting off to the country's villages, workshops, establishments and hidden corners in order to set before our eyes […] the treasures of a reality on whose shoulders time sets itself with old age [Steinhardt's italics], but who has lost neither courage, nor warm wisdom or a charm renewed with each fresh gaze."

=== Political views ===
As a political essayist, in addition to his critique of totalitarian systems both left- and right-wing, Chimet was noted for his rejection of all forms of racism, and for being an outspoken critic of antisemitism. According to Andrei Ursu, Gheorghe Ursu's son, this led nationalist voices to accuse Chimet, an ethnic Romanian who defended members of the Jewish community, of having become a jidovit ("Jew-turned"). Literary critic Constantin Stănescu linked his political views to the spirit of his works of fiction, defining him as "a Surrealist recoverer of innocence and a Utopian militant for purity, with a stubborn and inflexible faith […] in the victory of tolerance and communion against racial or class intolerance, as well as against the outbursts of the aggressive primeval spirit during the long century into which he was given to be born." Writing in 2006, Gheț argued that his anthologies were drawing up "the map of spiritual freedom and its impartation along unsuspected Euro-Atlantic lines, long before the political-strategic «axes» presently reclaimed." His activity in support of civil society has drawn comparisons with that of literary historian Adrian Marino, a leading member of the Romanian Civic Alliance, while Marino himself referred to Chimet, Alexandru George, Alexandru Paleologu and members of the Group for Social Dialogue as the sole "defenders of centrist cultural values" in post-1989 letters. According to essayist Michaël Finkenthal, Chimet "spent the last years of his life in a ceaseless battle to retrieve a past that some have forgotten and others have preferred, for various reasons, to neglect." Finkenthal also defined Chimet's message as: "before incriminating, before accusing, research the facts carefully. When man is in chains, when speaking is replaced by yelling, [man] is weak and can be easily tempted by the devil."

Chimet himself argued: "All I could do was to defend, in the books I managed to publish, as well as in the everyday life that emerges and disappears, the ideas of friendship, loyalty and human solidarity which the world of my childhood was presenting to us as the foundations of existence." He was self-effacing when it came to his legacy: "the new taste of the times shall be viewing these [goals] from the stratosphere, [they] shall be viewed as a concise moral, perhaps worthy of children in a church choir, a Boy Scout mentality, a Red Cross program, a street concert for the Salvation Army. The comparisons are unflattering, any plea in favor of these simple values seems compromised from the get-go. I must accept this handicap."

=== ExiL ===
His ExiL poems, some of which were first published in the West during the 1940s, have drawn comparisons with the imagery of original modern artists such as Joan Miró and Paul Klee. The title is a wordplay on exil (the Romanian-language word for "exile") and el ("him"), and the lyrics are addressed to a Jewish friend who had been deported during the Ion Antonescu dictatorship (see Holocaust in Romania). Decades later, Chimet indicated: "It was for the first time that the issue of exile showed up in Romania's post-war environment. At the time, it was, shall we say, a premiere. But it was not many years after that the Red Army turned this theme into a banal poetic motif."

The poems build on a repertoire of diverse traditions, which combines, in Paul Cernat words, "myths, symbols and ancient spiritual traditions, evoking the miraculous bestiary of humanity's childhood", assuming a shape similar to "troubadour ballads, blues and Negro spiritual songs, with choirs and invocations addressed to a minute universe" and "peopled by creatures and inanimate objects suffering from a silent, nameless pain." Among these writings was the 1947 Cântec spiritual negru ("Negro Spiritual Song"), which centered on the imaginary figure of a Saint Benjamin.

Also according to Cernat, aside from Surrealism, some of the ExiL poems recalled Imagism, while others were close to Lucian Blaga's Expressionism and the original style developed by Constant Tonegaru, or borrowed themes from the Biblical Ecclesiastes and the traditional stories of the Eastern world. A series of "laments", the pieces develop themes which Iordan Chimet would reuse in later works, such as the images of his native Galaţi as "the Old City" and an exiled monarch who would become "Baltazar the Little Fish". In one of the ExiL free verse pieces, titled Lamento cu o pălărie galbenă ("Lament with a Yellow Hat"), Chimet wrote of himself and the landscape of the Old City:

Dar vara întârzia. Și corăbiile ei cu pânze roșii
nu le-am zărit aruncând ancorele de fum deasupra sălciilor.
Am să cobor acum, să răstorn în praf, în fața porților
turta uscată și dulce de miere pentru păsările călătoare,
pentru veverițele cu sacul de alune pe spate
care, în faţa casei noastre, fac un ultim popas
în drum spre pădure.

Translation:

But summer tarried. And its ships with red sails,
I did not see throwing their smoke-like anchors over the willows.
I shall come down now, to throw in the dust, in front of the gates,
the dried-up and sweet honey cake for the migratory birds,
for the squirrels with their sacks of nuts hanging over their backs
who, in front of our house, make one last rest stop
on their way to the forest.

=== Fantasy writings ===
His fantasy works partly built on the Surrealist-Oniric legacy. Gheț proposed that such writings have been "mistakenly" placed in the field of children's literature—she preferred to define them as "transfers, evasions from the new mythical-totalitarian reality where all the Romanian sagacity had become stranded." In Paul Cernat's view, they form part of the fantasy genre to be read by adults, similar to the writings of Edward Lear, Antoine de Saint-Exupéry, J. R. R. Tolkien, Peter Beagle, and Lewis Carroll. Cernat argued: "Condescending prejudice has sought to exile [Chimet] into a shelf of curiosities merely frequented by a closed circle of connoisseurs: Chimet—the children's author, Chimet—the author of anthologies-manifestos for the innocence of adults, for the freedom of imagination and for the right to memory…"

Also set in the Old City, his Lamento pentru peștișorul Baltazar ("Lament for Baltazar the Little Fish") was authored during the 1940s, but, due to political constraints, was only published in 1968 (when it reportedly failed to be chronicled by any literary magazine). The story, divided into independent chapters which function as discourses, comprises several distinct poems: it opens with a "Song to the Sea", and comprises one in Chimet's series of "Laments".

Baltazar, who was defined by Cernat as "the messenger of innocence", is subjected to a trial and has to leave the Old City. In his adventures, the little fish is confronted with a various composite beings, whose identities are imprecise: Noi toți, which translates as "All of us", Mierea Pământului—"The Honey of the Earth", Vreo Doi (Vreo Doi era un șarpe de apă)—"Twosome (Twosome was a water snake)", Căpitanul de trei coți lungime, de trei coți lățime—"The three-cubit-long three-cubit-wide captain", Prințesa de Satin—"The Satin Princess" etc. Cernat paralleled these elements to the Absurdist plays of Eugène Ionesco, as well as to the tradition of nonsense verse in English literature. He likened the wordplays and intricate calligraphy associated with the characters and plot to the Lettrist experiments, and the themes they alluded to with those present in some later works by Romanian poet Marin Sorescu. Thus, he proposed that an episode marking the mythological age of Chimet's sea realm, where a character named Arghir asks a whale to swallow him, reminded one of Sorescu's poem Iona (with both of them being reinterpretations of the Old Testament story of Jonah).

Cernat also noted that the playful atmosphere was doubled by "the diffuse sentiment of absence, estrangement and universal extinguishment". To illustrate this, he quoted one of Baltazar's lines, accompanied by the narrator's voice: "«To wake up at the earliest hour, with the flowers. To hear their suave virgin-like voices. To see if my hungry and thirsty fish […] have been properly fed. And if all things are as they should, in orchards and in waters, as they should be for ever and ever.» But his fish were gone, as was the good fairy, as was the pond of the water of life, of the water of death. And all of them had gone out of sight. He could hear them neighing and clattering at the gates, far away."

One of the most influential works in this series was Închide ochii și vei vedea Orașul. Cernat called it: "a refined musical poem, apparently naïve, unveiling unexpected depths to the reader, through the means of shared asides" and "an open game of fantasy filled with love for all that exists, where reality fades into the genuine fantastic of an eternal childhood's unreality, hardly shadowed by melancholy." The story centers on a cosmopolitan city (based on Chimet's vision of Galați), which is disputed between the orange-colored dwarfs who live in the "labyrinth forest" and the shapeshifting ogre Gagafu, who is assisted by an evil cat named Sultan. The latter two twice kidnap Eli, a girl who serves as protector of the city and is introduced as the narrator's daughter: she is ultimately rescued by the dwarfs, who transport her to their forest; Elli pines for her home, and the dwarfs ultimately decide to let her return. Melancholy, sad musings, and reflections about the fragility of existence are present throughout the book; at one point toward the end of the story, Chimet's narrator confesses: "And then I withdrew, tiptoeing, to my canopy in the garden and I asked myself, sitting alone, what the sense of all these events was. And it seemed to me that I discovered it. And I flinched. And I perked up my ears, believing that I heard unheard footsteps outside or the flapping of wings in the sky. But there was no such thing."

In Cele 12 luni..., an anthology for the benefit of young readers, Chimet honored fellow children's writer and avant-garde fantasy authors; the authors quoted include Carroll, Ionesco, Saint-Exupéry, Hans Christian Andersen, Tudor Arghezi, Ion Creangă, Alfred Jarry, Henri Michaux, Mihail Sadoveanu, Mark Twain, Tristan Tzara, Urmuz, Tiberiu Utan, etc. Chimet's own piece was Lamento cu o mare baaaaalenă ("Lament with One Big Whaaaaale") seen by critic Marina Debattista as a sample of Chimet's mix of "the hero narrative" and "tiny Surrealist poems" into a single original format.

The book was richly illustrated, mostly with samples of Surrealist art, from Paul Klee to Max Ernst. It also hosted unusual collages of literary contributions by Christian Pineau and drawings by Arghezi, Mateiu Caragiale, Franz Kafka or Federico García Lorca. Commenting on the anthology's subversive content, Marina Debattista noted: "The reader is discreetly engaged into practicing a form of Surrealism, which temporarily frees him from the clutches of reality. The latter effect is significant for the context in which 'The Anthology of Innocence' saw print: in 1970s Romania, the wooden language, like some acid, insidious sea, eroded spirits and clamped down on their natural opening for the miraculous."

== Legacy ==
For long after the Romanian Revolution, Chimet's work remained unknown to the local public. Paul Cernat noted that, when the Democratic Convention governments allowed private publishing houses to issue school textbooks of Romanian literature, Iordan Chimet's were made more available to schoolchildren. He also recorded that, since the new educational approaches favored familiarizing students with works of universal and modern literature at the detriment of local classics, Chimet was the subject of attacks in the nationalist press (who listed Chimet, alongside authors such as Ende, Edward Lear, Lewis Carroll, Jorge Luis Borges, and Mircea Horia Simionescu, not worthy of inclusion in the textbooks).

In 2000, Lamento pentru peștișorul Baltazar was reprinted in a Romanian-German bilingual edition, with assistance from the Goethe-Institut. The volume was illustrated with drawings made for this purpose by some of Chimet's friends: the writers Ionesco, Claude Aveline, Richard Bach, Emilio Breda, Odysseas Elytis, and the Mexican visual artists Juan Soriano and José Garcia Ocejo.

It is believed that Închide ochii și vei vedea Orașul inspired various aspects of Michael Ende's The Neverending Story and that, in Ende's Das Gauklermärchen ("The Juggler's Tale"), Chimet's Elli became Eli, a simple and poor girl who believes herself a princess. The Chimet-Ende correspondence was published as a book in 1999. In 2006–2007, Chimet also published two volumes of the letters he exchanged with various other authors, including Ursu and Camil Baciu, under the title Cartea prietenilor mei ("My Friends' Book"). Following a Romanian Writers' Union initiative, a memorial plaque was placed at his apartment bloc in Titan.

== Published volumes ==
=== Children's literature ===
- Lamento pentru peștișorul Baltazar, 1968
- Cîte-o gîză, cîte-o floare, cîte-un fluture mai mare, 1970
- Închide ochii și vei vedea Orașul, 1970, definitive edition, 1979

=== Essays ===
- Western. Filmele Vestului îndepărtat, 1966
- Comedia burlescă, 1967
- Teatrul de păpuși în România (with Letiția Gîtză, Valentin Silvestru), 1968
- Eroi, fantome, șoricei, 1970
- Baladă pentru vechiul drum, 1976
- America latină. Sugestii pentru o galerie sentimentală, 1984
- A Trilingual Exercise in Translation (originally in English; with Ioana Belcea), 1995
- Cele două Europe, cele două Românii, 2004

=== Other ===
- ExiL, poetry, 1948
- Cele 12 luni ale visului. O antologie a inocenței, anthology, 1972
- Grafica americană: un portret al Americii, album, 1976
- Dreptul la memorie, anthology, 1992
- Cică niște cronicari, duceau lipsă de șalvari, anthology, 1999
- Împreună cu Elli în Imaginaria (with Michael Ende), memoir, 1999
- Dosar Mihail Sebastian, biography, 2001
- Scrisori printre gratii (with Odysseas Elytis, Michael Ende, Maria Marian), memoir, 2004
- Cartea prietenilor mei (with Vasile Igna), memoir, 2005
