= Irod =

This is an article about a precursor to Romanian popular theater. For the antediluvian patriarch, see Irad

Irozii (singular Irod) were Romanian Orthodox minstrel shows, played in the Christmas season, centered on the figure of Herod the Great (Romanian: Irod) and the Massacre of the Innocents. Along with a New Year tradition of imitation peasant weddings, they are generally considered the origin of Romanian-language popular theater.

Irozii influenced the Purim plays of the Romanian Jews (generally credited as the origin of Yiddish theater) and vice versa. Thus, the origin of Romanian-language popular theater in the first half of the 19th century was echoed in the later origin (also in Romania) of Yiddish theater.

Typically performed by schoolteachers and deacons, irozii initially took place in the boyar's or lord's court; in later years, performances would be given in the salons of the grand houses. Irozii began to fade in the late 19th century; elaborate pageants are no longer common, though a less elaborate form continues.
