= Vasile Șeicaru =

Romanian folk musician (born 1951)

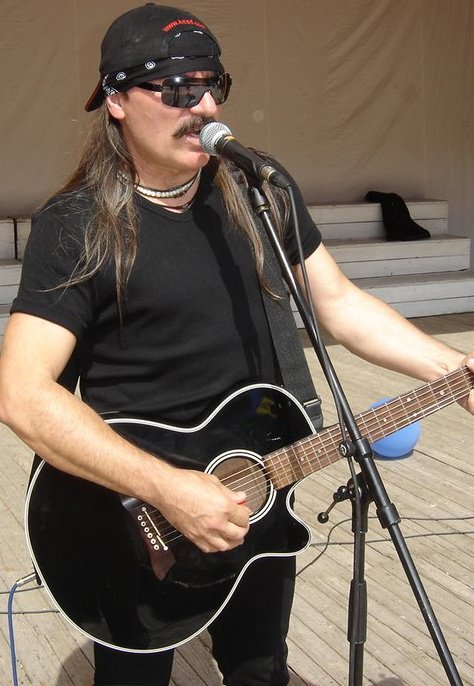
Vasile Șeicaru

Vasile Șeicaru (born 10 July 1951 in Galați) is a Romanian folk musician. In the past he has worked with Cenaclul Flacăra.

== See also ==
- List of Romanian musicians
- Music of Romania
