= Sybille Pantazzi =

Canadian librarian and writer (1914–1983)

- Sybille Pantazzi
- Born: Sybille Oltea Yvonne Pantazzi; April 2, 1914; Galați, Romania
- Died: July 23, 1983 (aged 69); Toronto, Ontario, Canada
- Education: University of Toronto
- Occupations: librarian, bibliophile, writer

Sybille Pantazzi (April 2, 1914 – July 23, 1983) was a Canadian librarian, bibliophile and writer. She was librarian of The Edward P. Taylor Library & Archives of the Art Gallery of Ontario in Toronto for 32 years, where she was responsible for its collection of books and periodicals. Besides being a notable book collector, she was a scholar with wide-ranging interests. She and her work influenced researchers and gallery staff, a number of whom went on to become curators or directors of galleries and museums across Canada.

== Early life ==
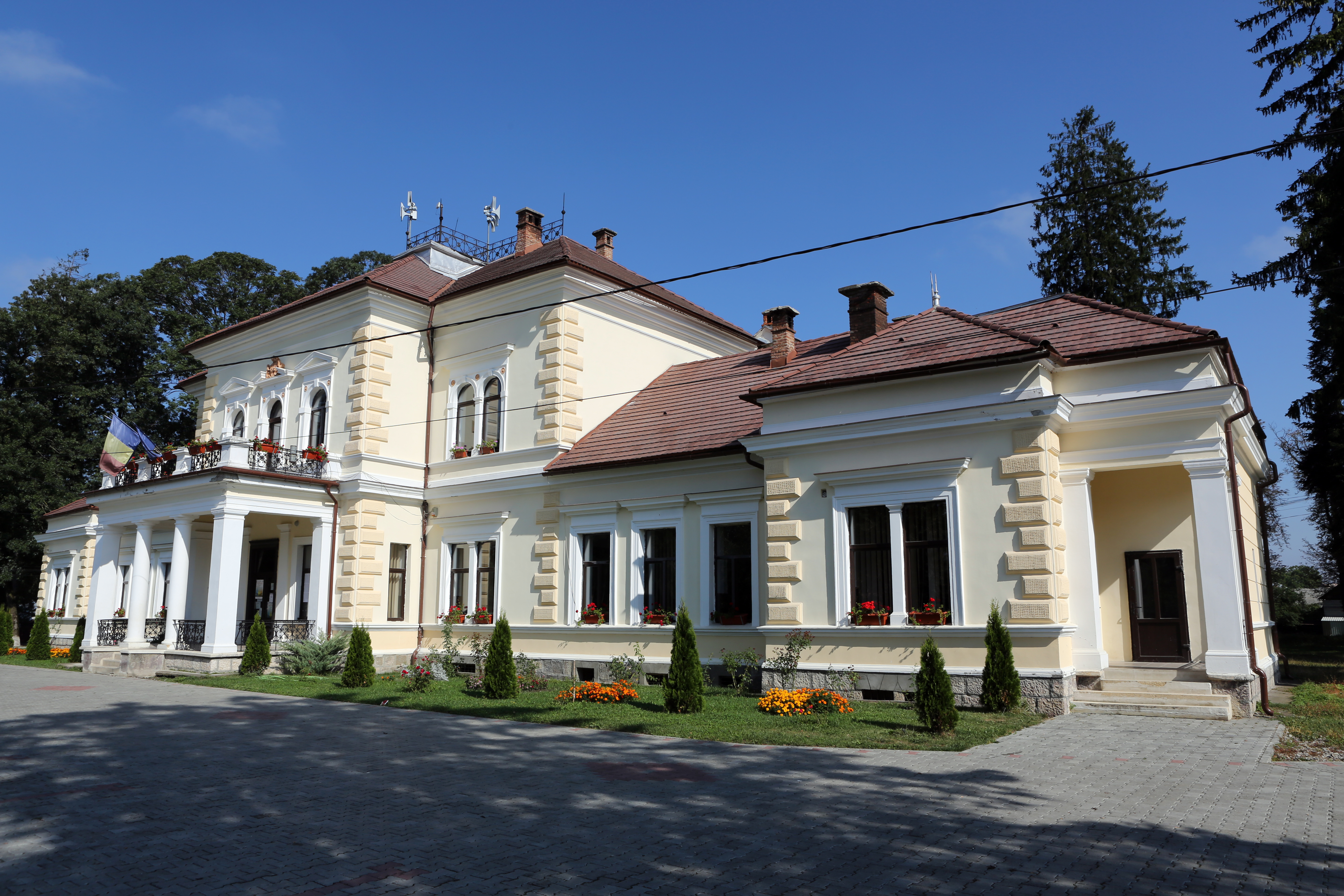
Béldy László Castle in Budila, former home of the Pantazzi family, now town hall

Pantazzi was born in Galați, Romania, on April 2, 1914, to Commander, later Admiral Vasile "Basil" Pantazzi (1871–1945), a Romanian naval officer and occasional diplomat; and Canadian Ethel Sharp Greening (1880–1963), an author and a committed feminist.

In her early years, Pantazzi accompanied her family in their trans-continental peregrinations. She spent the period of 1916–1917 in Odessa, Russia, where her father installed the Romanian Senate and some ministries in exile, owing to the German invasion of Romania. Then came the Russian Revolution. After a brief spell in Romania, the family moved to Paris where Commander Pantazzi was a delegate to the Paris Peace Conference. At the end of 1919, the family moved to North America where he established the first Romanian embassy in Washington, D.C., and the first Romanian consulate in Canada, in Montreal. Pantazzi attended primary school in Montreal, 1920–1922. On the family's return to France in 1922, Pantazzi was enrolled in a women's private school with an international student body, south of Paris, graduating in 1931. In 1933, the Pantazzi family returned to Romania, settling in Bucharest and at Budila, in Transylvania. Until World War II, they also made visits to Canada.

== Career ==
She gained experience in cataloguing books from her father and mother who both collected, as well as from cataloguing libraries of a country neighbour and of a library in a foundation. On the outbreak of World War II, Pantazzi joined the Romanian Red Cross as an ambulance driver near the front lines. After the Paris Peace Treaties were signed in 1947, she became librarian of the British Council Library in Bucharest.

In spring 1946, Pantazzi and her mother Ethel were granted an exit visa for a visit to Canada, by the new Communist government. In Toronto, after a period as librarian of the Board of Trade, she was hired in 1948 as librarian at the Art Gallery of Toronto (now the Art Gallery of Ontario), where she remained for the rest of her working life. Under her direction the library grew from a collection of several hundred books to one of over 25,000. She retired as Chief Librarian in 1980.

While working, she obtained a B.A. and a M.A. in Romance languages at the University of Toronto.

=== Work and interests ===
Pantazzi was interested was in almost every aspect of the physical appearance of books which gathered together in an imaginative way would illustrate the manufacture, selling or distribution of books in any period. She particularly was interested in the printed image and its permutations, but that interest competed with other subjects, such as early travel guides, artist's libraries, Canadian prize books awarded students, bookplates and stamps, often neglected areas which she pioneered and for which she is noted. She launched an interest in 19th century commercially bound books, the early work for publications by artists such as the Group of Seven, the importance of artist's frames, Vernon Lee, and others.

Typically, Pantazzi pinned down a subject, but let others continue the investigation. She is known foremost as a collector of books. Her collection of examples of 19th century bookbinding was, at least in part, the source material necessary for her articles on the subject. Parts of her collection of Victorian and Edwardian bindings, her research base for her pioneering articles on that subject, were donated by her family, respectively, to the Thomas Fisher Rare Book Library and to Massey College at the University of Toronto. To the Fisher Library also, the family donated her collection of books by Vernon Lee with her research on the subject.

Her collecting instinct was almost entirely focused on the Art Gallery of Ontario. The collection of book jackets along with her index cards is in the Edward P. Taylor Library & Archives Special Collections at the Art Gallery of Ontario in Toronto, where the library's current online catalogue was named "Sibyl" in her honour. She also was a devoted collector of Pinocchio and gave many items to the Osborne Collection of Early Children's Books in Toronto.

=== Curator ===
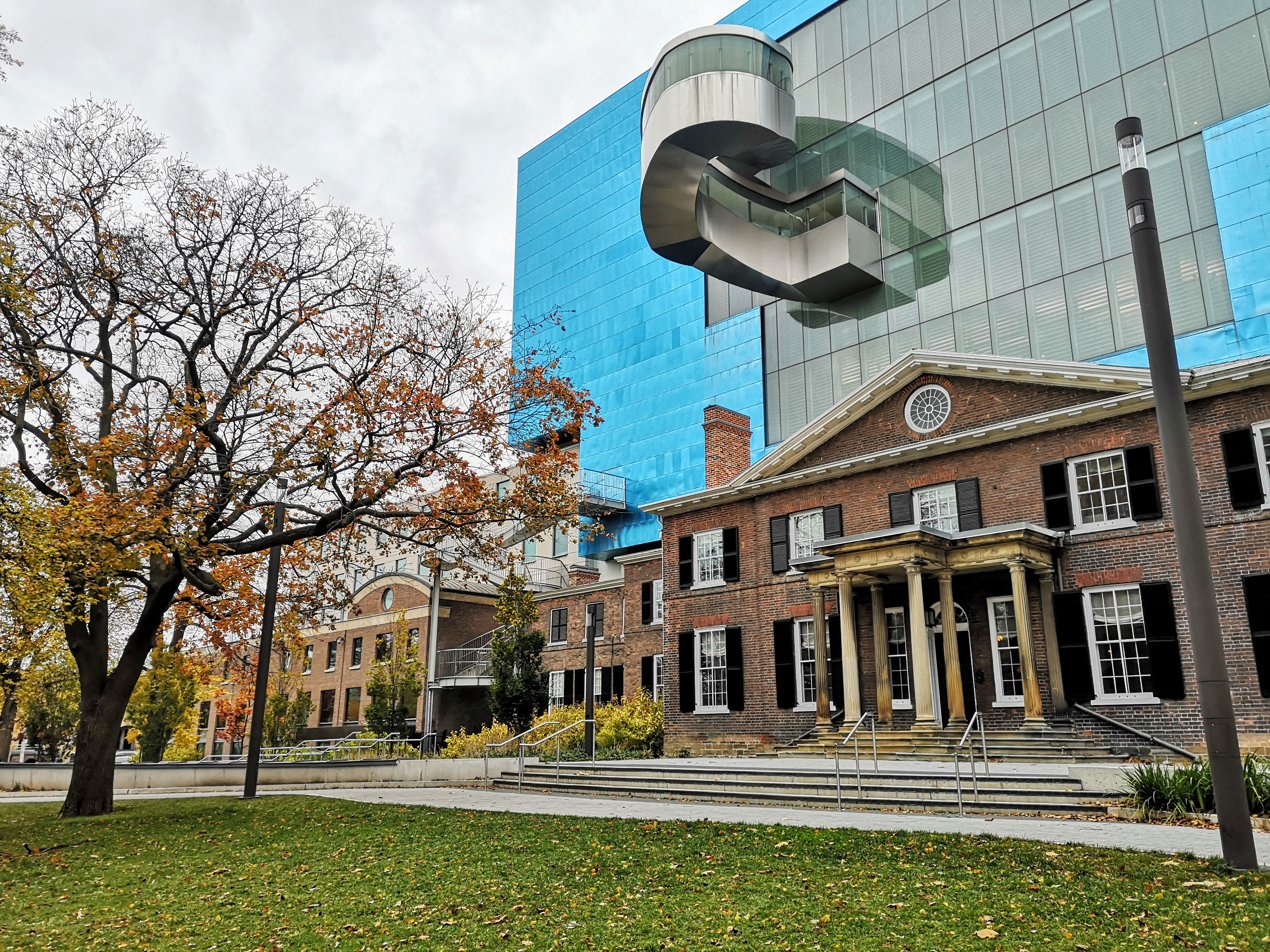
Art Gallery of Toronto, old (The Grange) and new (AGO) buildings

Pantazzi served as an unofficial research curator from 1956 on, at the then Art Gallery of Toronto and other institutions. She was particularly interested in Old Master paintings, drawings and prints. Along with organizing an exhibition of Alan Garrow's collection of British 19th century illustrated books and bindings which had been given to the Gallery, she supported many exhibitions with articles, bibliography or catalogue entries, as well as writing scholarly articles for magazines such as Connoisseur. She continued this role when Nancy Dillow, who had formerly worked at the Art Gallery of Toronto, became director of the Norman Mackenzie Art Gallery in Regina (now the MacKenzie Art Gallery) (1967–1978), supporting many scholarly exhibitions for her, as well as continuing to support exhibitions at the Art Gallery of Ontario, often those organized by Katharine Lochnan, Curator of Prints and Drawings.

In the Canadian area of the collection, she wrote in depth about the foreign art shown at the Canadian National Exhibition, 1905–1938. She also was the first to write about book illustration and design by Canadian artists.

During her lifetime, she gave the children's books she collected to the Osborne Collection of Early Children's Books at the Toronto Public Library, where an annual Sybille Pantazzi Memorial Lecture is held.

Her nearly twenty-year correspondence and the library on art in fiction she formed with the American art-historian Ulrich Alexander Middledorf (1925–1981) is in special collections at the Getty Research Institute, Research Library. (Note: Accession no. 950004)

== Selected works ==
- Four Designers of English Publishers' Bindings, 1850–1880, and Their Signatures (1961)
- The Donna Laura Minghetti Leonardo: An International Mystification (1965)
- An Album of 18th Century Venetian Operatic Caricatures Formerly in the Collection of Count Algarotti, Biographical note on Algarotti (1980)

== Gallery ==
Book cover designs from Pantazzi's
Four Designers of English Publishers' Bindings, 1850–1880, and Their Signatures

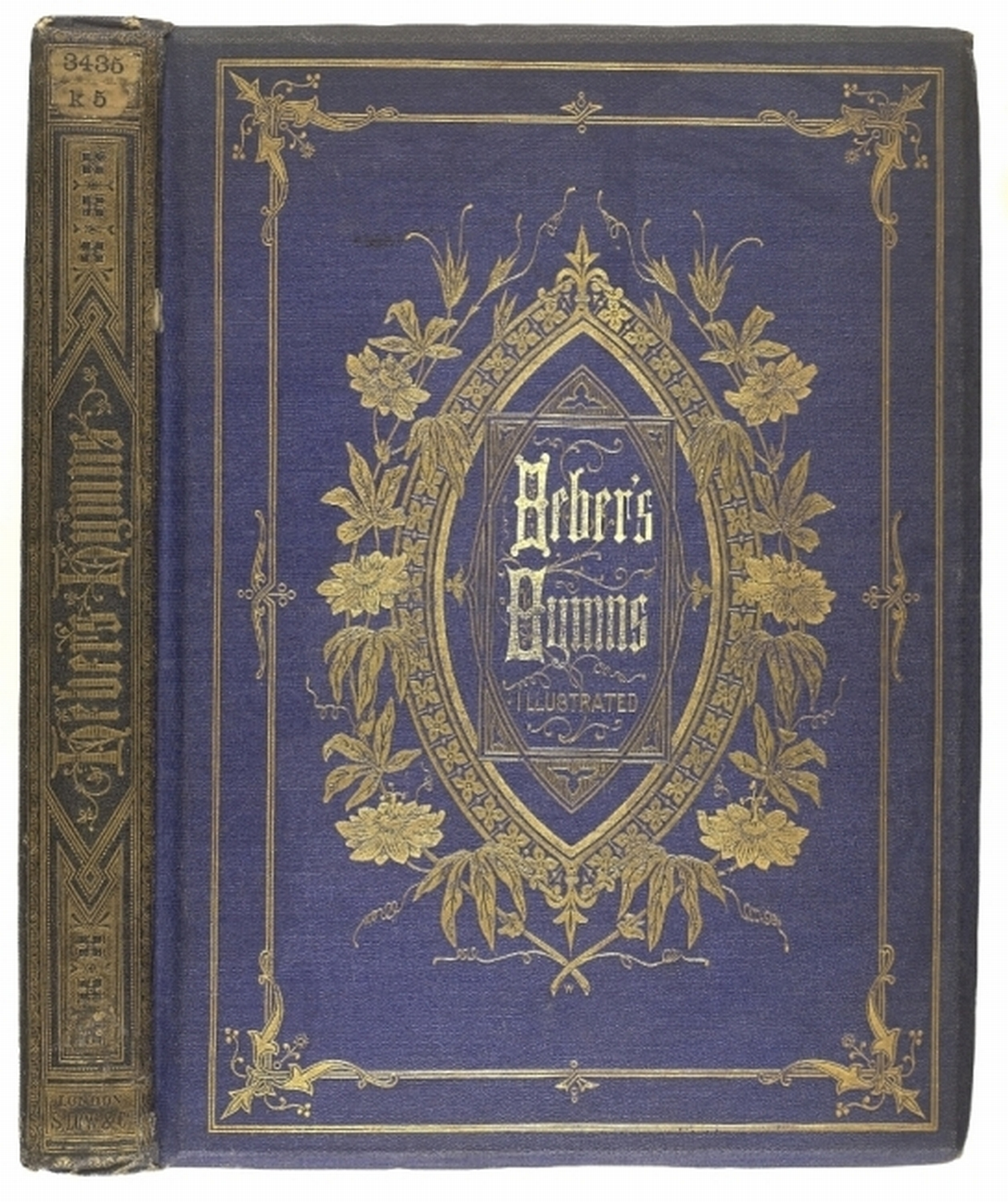
Heber's Hymns Illustrated, designed by William Harry Rogers

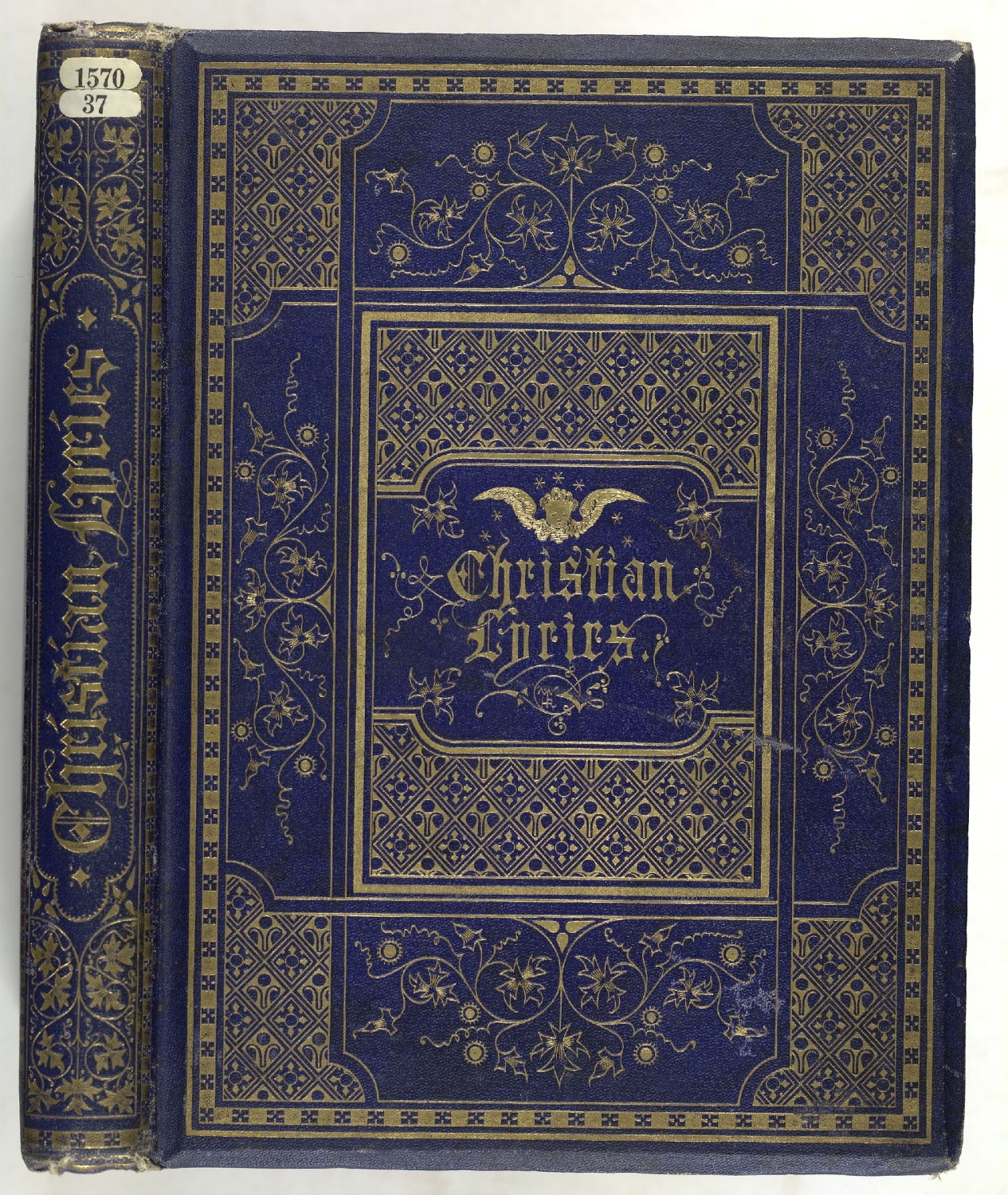
Christian lyrics, designed by William Harry Rogers

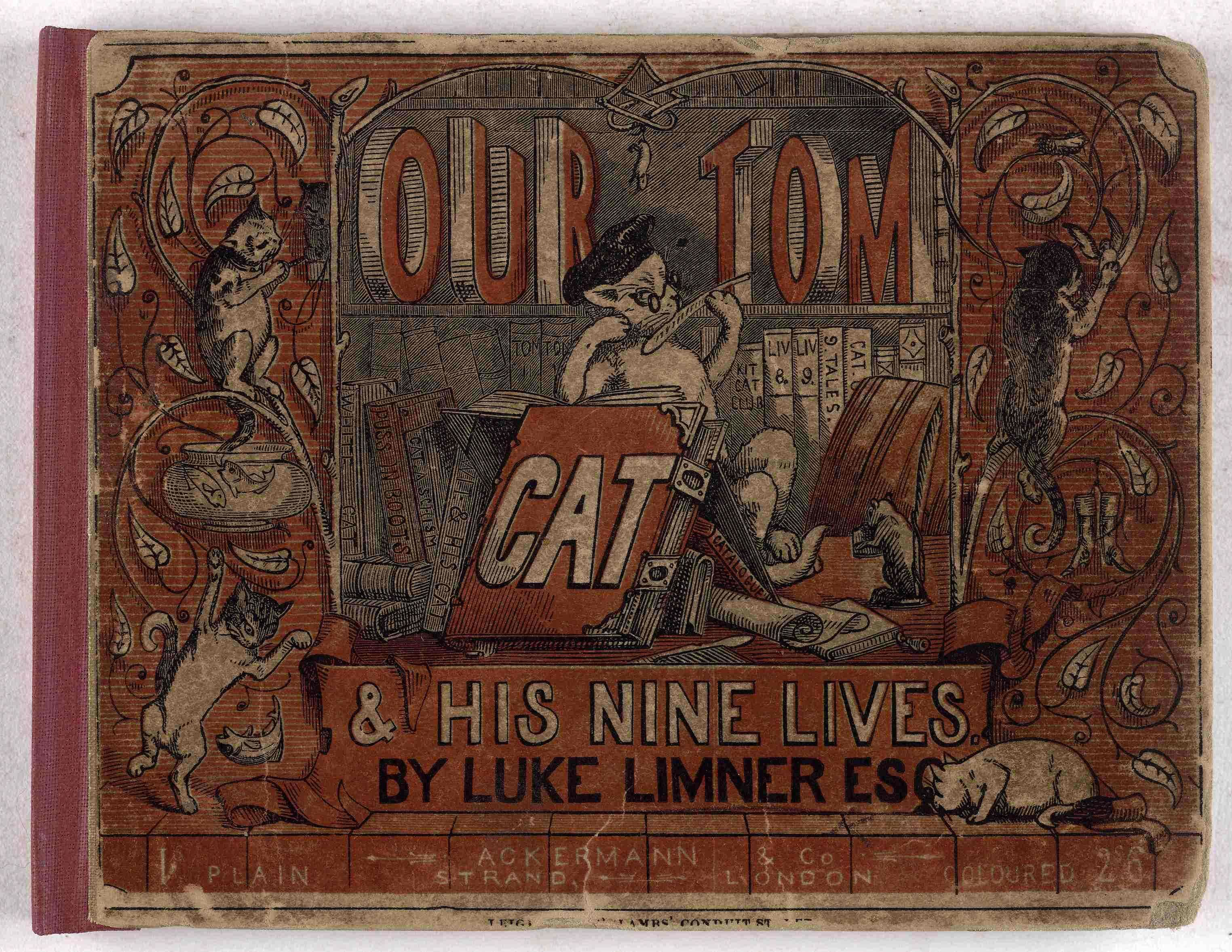
Our tom cat and his nine lives, designed by John Leighton

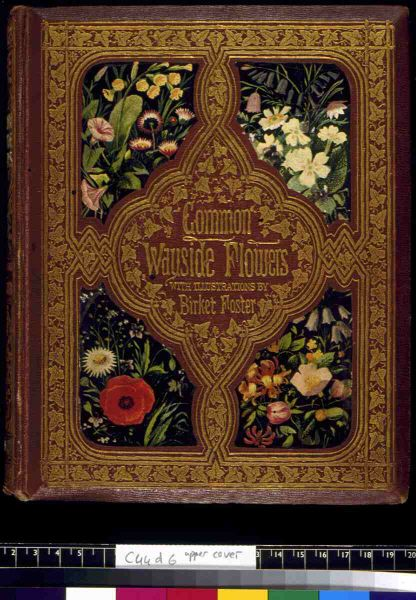
Common wayside flowers, designed by Albert Warren
