= Camil Baciu =

Romanian journalist and science fiction writer

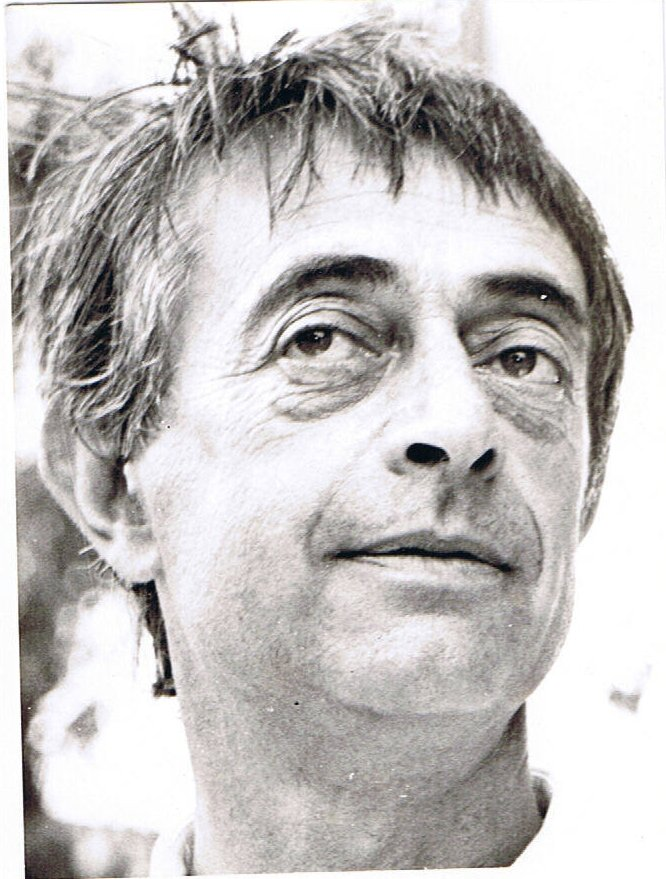
- Born: Camillo Kaufman
- Died: 22 April 2005 (aged 78)
- Occupations: Journalist, writer

Camil Baciu (born Camillo Kaufman 21 June 1926, Galați – died 22 April 2005, Paris) was a Romanian journalist and science fiction writer.

Camil Baciu was born Camillo Kaufman, in Galați Romania to a Jewish family. He studied in Vasile Alecsandri high school and later in the Polytechnic institute in Bucharest, majoring in Hydraulics. He worked as an engineer for seven years but later switched vocation and started writing plays and prose.

While working as a journalist for the newspaper Flacăra, he went on a rowing expedition on the Danube river, from the Iron Gates to the delta and published his diary in the newspaper.

He was a friend of, among others, Iordan Chimet (with whom he was part of an anti-Fascist group) and Gheorghe Ursu. In 1969 he left Romania, settling in Paris.

In Lyon, France, Camil Baciu founded the Neutrino pantomime theater. In 1974 he wrote the play "Pledoyer Pour August" which showed in Théâtre de l’Atelier on Paris.

== Bibliography ==
- "Not Far From The Princess Castle", București, 1956
- "Experience Colombina", CPSF 126-127, Science and Technology Review, 1960 (2 vol.)
- "Brain Revolt", Tineretului Publishing House, București, 1962
- "Cubic Planet", Tineretului Publishing House, București, 1964
- "The Great Law", 1964
- "Met...", Editura Revista Știință și Tehnică, 1964 (2 vol.)
- "The Orange Sun", 1965
- "The Destiny Machine", Tineretului Publishing House, București, 1966
- "Ienicec", 1967
- "The Garden of the Gods", Tineretului Publishing House, București, 1968 (re-published in 2001 at the Romanian Cultural Foundation Publishing House)
- Aragua, novel
