= Dâmbul Rotund =

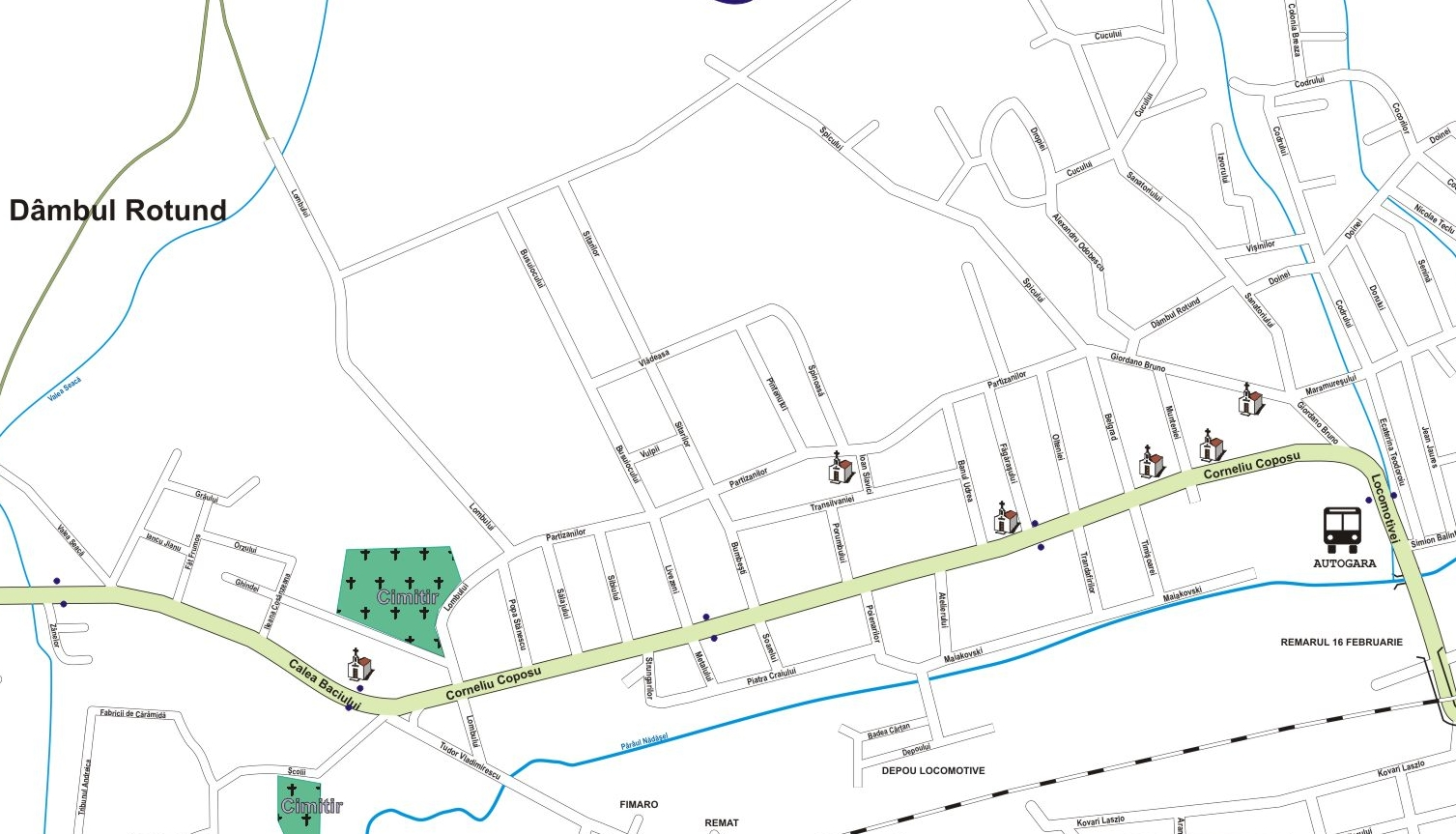
Map of the district

Dâmbul Rotund (Hungarian Kerekdomb) is a residential neighborhood in north-western Cluj-Napoca.
