= Tatiana Stepa =

- Born: April 21, 1963; Lupeni, Hunedoara County, Romanian People's Republic
- Died: August 7, 2009 (aged 46) Bucharest, Romania
- Genres: Folk
- Occupations: Musician, composer, vocalist
- Instruments: Vocals, guitar
- Years active: 1982—2009

Tatiana Stepa (April 21, 1963 – August 7, 2009) was a Romanian folk singer.

== Biography ==
Born in Lupeni, she attended the High School for Architecture in Bucharest and made her debut in 1982 with Cenaclul Flacăra at the Făgăraș stadium.

Stepa died at the Military Hospital in Bucharest after a long illness due to cervical cancer, and was buried in the city's Bellu Cemetery.
