= Mihail Crama =

Romanian poet and writer (1923–1994)

Mihail Crama (born Eugen Enăchescu Pasad; January 1, 1923 – April 17, 1994) was a Romanian poet and prose writer.

Born in Cetatea Albă, his parents were Mihail Enăchescu, a military physician, and his wife Maria (née Pasad), a nurse. He attended the military high school in Iași and Nicolae Bălcescu High School in Brăila, graduating in 1941. His first poems and articles appeared in 1939 in the local newspapers Ancheta, Cuvântul, Facla and Expresul. Initially enrolling in a school for Gendarmerie officers, he abandoned this in favor of the University of Bucharest's law faculty, from which he obtained a degree in 1945. Subsequently, he worked as a legal adviser at the Justice Ministry and as head of the civil section within the Supreme Tribunal.

Crama's contributions appeared in Vremea, Claviaturi, Adonis, Prepoem, Revista Fundațiilor Regale and Caiet de poezie. He read poetry in the Sburătorul circle and joined the group of writers affiliated with Kalende magazine. His first book was the 1947 Decor penitent, which earned the Carol I Academic Foundation Prize. After two decades of silence, self-imposed in order to avoid compromises with the communist regime, he returned with the short volumes of verse Dincolo de cuvinte (1967), Determinări (1970), Codice (1974) and Ianuarii (1976). Together with his debut volume and the set of unpublished poems Decor penitent II, all were issued in 1979 as Împărăția de seară, which earned the Romanian Academy's Eminescu Prize. His 1986 Singurătatea din urmă, apparently autobiographical, was philosophical in scope. Trecerea (1981) and Dogma (1984; Bucharest Writers' Society Prize) were two late poetry volumes. Călător spre porțile asfințitului, a novel written from 1988 to 1991 and published posthumously in 2006, takes up the autobiographical theme. The protagonist, now mature, works in the legal profession, both on the Bărăgan Plain and in a city readily apparent as Brăila.
