= Paul Barbă Neagră =

Romanian film director (1929–2009)

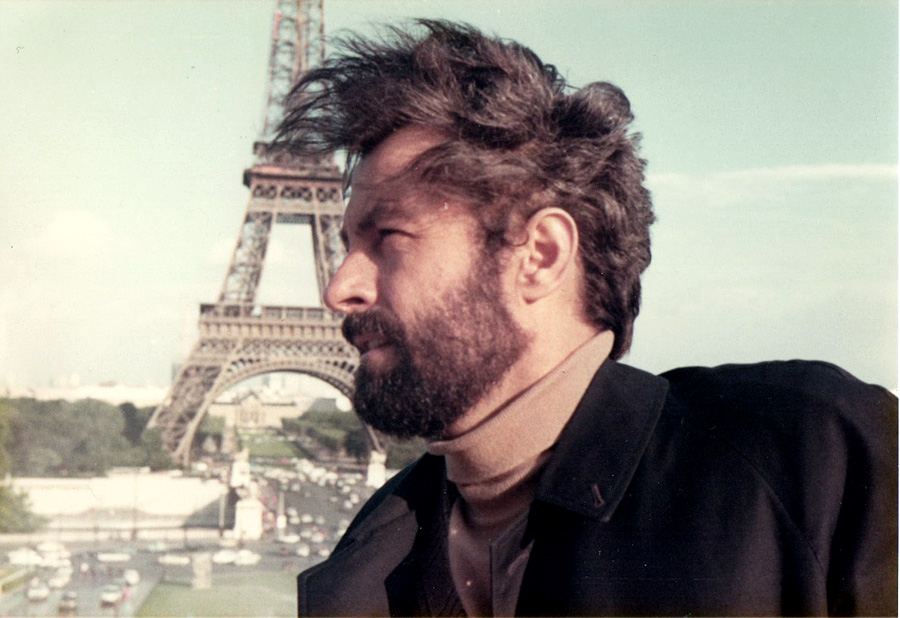
- Born: 11 February 1929; Isaccea, Tulcea County, Romania
- Died: 13 October 2009 (aged 80); Paris, France
- Education: Caragiale National University of Theatre and Film
- Occupations: Film director, journalist, screenwriter

Paul Barbă Neagră (or Barbăneagră) (11 February 1929 – 13 October 2009) was a Romanian film director and writer who, starting in 1957, directed short and medium-length documentaries on topics related to culture and the arts. In 1964, he defected and settled in France, where he also worked in the media outlet (for France 2, France 3, and Radio Free Europe).

== Biography ==
Born in Isaccea, he studied medicine and cinematography in Bucharest, and graduated from the I. L. Caragiale Institute for Theater and Film Arts. Between 1957 and 1964, he worked for the film studios of Communist Romania. During a visit to Tours (where he attended the local film festival), he sought political asylum.

He was awarded a first prize for the scenario of his film Versailles Palais-Temple du Roi Soleil ("Palace of Versailles, Temple of the Sun King") at the Festival International du Film d'Art (International Festival for Art Films). This film was the first in his series Architecture et Géographie sacrée ("Sacred Architecture and Geography"). The series also includes the documentary Mircea Eliade et la Redécouverte du Sacré ("Mircea Eliade and the Rediscovery of the Sacred").

In 1990, he was awarded The French Grand Prix for Audiovisual Arts for his entire activity.

In 2004, he published with Symbolique de Paris: Paris sacré, Paris mythique with Félix Schwarz (Les Éditions du Huitième Jour, 2004).

== See also ==
- List of Eastern Bloc defectors
