= Nightlosers =

- Origin: Cluj-Napoca, Transylvania, central Romania
- Genres: Rhythm and blues, ethno blues, Romanian folk music
- Years active: 1994–present
- Labels: Digital Record; Taurus; Genius; Macondo
- Members: Hanno Höfer; Jimy Lako; Grunzo Geza; Ovidiu Condrea; Lucian Pop
- Past members: Sandy Deac; Sorin Câmpean; Lucian Cioargă; Octavian Andreescu
- Website: www.nightlosers.ro

Nightlosers is a Romanian ethno-jazz-blues band. The band consists of Hanno Höfer (guitars, harmonica, washboard, vocals), Octavian Barila Andreescu (bass), El Lako Jimy (drums), and Géza Grunzó (keyboards). The band has seen a number of changes. Earlier members include Sandy Deac, Sorin Câmpean, Lucian Cioargă, Ovidiu Condrea, and bass player Octavian "Barila" Andreescu.

At various times, the band has invited others to take part notably vocalists Kati Panek, Sanda Lăcătuș, Tanta Lăcătuș, clarinet player Liviu Todea, musicians Nucu Pandrea and Pusztai Aladar.

Nightlosers' music is influenced by Gypsy and Romanian folk music.

== Discography ==
- Sitting on Top of the World (1995)
- Plum Brandy Blues (1997)
- Rhythm & Bulz (2004)
- Cinste lor (2013)
