= Ștefan Tita =

Romanian writer and political figure (1905–1977)

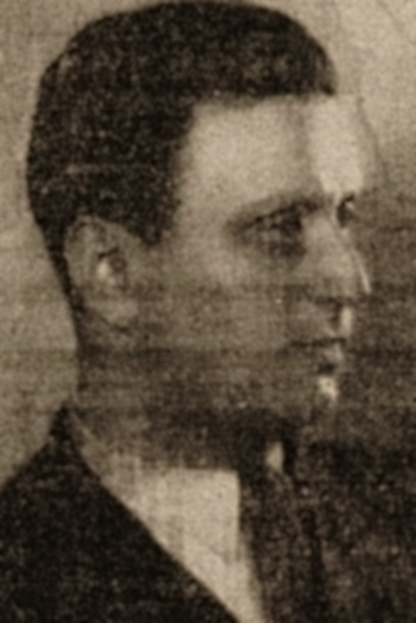
- Tita c. 1937
- Born: Teodor Solomon; 14 August 1905; Bucharest, Kingdom of Romania
- Died: 1 September 1977 (aged 72); Bucharest, Socialist Republic of Romania
- Occupations: Journalist; politician; civil servant; translator; dramaturge; songwriter; trade unionist
- Writing career
- Period: 1919–1977
- Genres: Short story; sketch story; novella; parable; children's literature; young adult literature; biography; reportage; memoir; science fiction; political poetry; epigram; anecdote; riddle; satire; boulevardier theater; revue; farce; sex comedy; political drama; historical drama; melodrama; dramatic poem; closet drama; children's theater; libretto; teleplay; radioplay
- Literary movement: Social realism; Expressionism; Socialist realism; Didacticism

Ștefan Tita (born Teodor Solomon; 14 August 1905 – 1 September 1977) was a Romanian left-wing activist and writer in multiple genres. He had his poetic debut as a teenager in 1919, after which he became noted first for his pacifist prose, and later for his contributions to social realism. Before World War II, he had also specialized in satire, and, reflecting his own Jewish roots, had taken up work in the revue genre at The Barașeum. After becoming a disciple of Ion Pas, Tita was attracted into the socialist and anti-fascist movement, joining the Social Democratic Party and working as editor of its press organs. The party was banned in 1938, but he himself continued to write for some two years, being integrated with Mihai Ralea's Muncă și Voe Bună organization. Jewish writers were banned altogether during the pro-Nazi regime established by Ion Antonescu; Tita had to rely on handouts for his survival.

Returning as a Social Democratic operative immediately after Antonescu's downfall in August 1944, Tita was generally enthusiastic about the leftward shift of Romanian politics; he was also employed as a censor by the Ministry of Propaganda, even though his own politics and Expressionist aesthetics did not yet fully align with the conduct demanded by the Romanian Communist Party. In 1945, as Pas took charge of the Ministry of Arts, he made Tita his right-hand man. Both figures were mistrusted by the communists, who established a Romanian people's republic on the closing days of 1947. Tita was sent to educate himself among the proletariat, then removed from his position at the ministry. He then oriented himself toward a career in communist agitprop, primarily active in political theater and songwriting, as well as focusing on translations from world literature, and on proofreading Pas' novels. His own contributions for the stage (some of which were done in collaboration with Ionel Țăranu and Liviu Floda) were often dismissed by the socialist-realist mainstream, as well as by independent critics, who described them as unbearably melodramatic.

The late 1950s witnessed Tita's return, primarily in the realms of children's and young adult literature—but also integrated within the emerging school of Romanian science fiction. Though prolific, and employed to write teleplays for the state television network, he was widely criticized for his extreme didacticism; he was additionally mocked for his rhyming anecdotes in the humor magazine Urzica, which reviewers found to be excessively bland, and also censured for his attempts at reviving the farce and sex comedy genres. In old age, he expanded on his previous contribution to agitprop songwriting, becoming recognized in pop music, which he infused with messages favoring socialist patriotism. His final plays were about two figures of 19th-century progressivism, Teodor Diamant and Constantin Daniel Rosenthal.

== Biography ==
=== Youth ===
Tita, officially registered as Teodor Solomon, was born in Bucharest, capital of the Romanian Kingdom, on 14 August 1905; he was of Jewish origin. Researcher and fellow children's author Tudor Opriș traces his published debut to 1919, when two of his epigrams were taken up by the student magazine Crinul. He was studying at Gheorghe Șincai National College, during which time he formed his own "literary society" (cenaclu), which held meetings in his parents' attic. An anti-war poem of Tita's appeared in 1920 in Biblioteca Copiilor și a Tineretului. The same magazine also put out his first works of prose, and of children's literature. According to his own recollections, as a teenager he also published anti-monarchic pieces in N. D. Cocea's magazine, Facla, but was not yet a socialist at that stage.

Tita enrolled at the University of Bucharest department of law, and in the meantime began working in the political press—from Aurora and Adevărul to Viața Romînească; he was also a contributor to Libertatea, put out by the Social Democratic Party (PSDR). Meeting and befriending Ion Pas while writing for Șantier magazine, he became fully supportive of the socialist agenda. Over the years, he contributed regularly to the other party magazine, Lumea Nouă, with articles which outlined his belief in a "progressive Romania". By 1934, he was a regular at Tudor Teodorescu-Braniște's Cuvântul Liber, a magazine that critic Lucian Boz described as the voice of Romania's social realism. Tita himself fit the trend, with "crudely realistic notes about life in the mahala". In January 1935, Cuvântul Liber hosted his reportage about the most marginalized sections of the Bucharest proletariat, namely the bus-ticket collectors and the gong farmers. Increasingly, Tita's focus was on denouncing class inequalities and condemning fascism. Some of his contributions were featured in Pariser Tageszeitung, put out in France by refugees from Nazi Germany. They included the novella "Maâag", which had originally been carried by Cuvântul Liber. Largely a pacifist parable, it showed apemen being introduced to a murderous civilization; revisiting the piece in 1969, writer Ion Hobana proposed that the Pariser Tageszeitung translation may have been read by Pierre Boulle, and was then integrated as one of the literary inspirations for Boulle's own Planet of the Apes.

In August 1935, Tita announced that he was working on a novel called Sindicatul zeilor ("Trade Union of the Gods") and a volume called Fabule pentru adulți ("Fables for the Grown-Ups"), both set to appear at Adevărul's editorial venture. Instead, he produced a biography of the progressive activist Nicolae L. Lupu. Appearing at Carmen Sylva publishers in late 1936, it was afforded praise by Teodorescu-Braniște. This was followed in 1938 by Tita's first volume of literary prose, Avantajul de-a fi câine ("The Perks of Being a Dog"). Tita's close friend, the poet Liviu Bratoloveanu, describes it as a "novel [about] the misdeeds of capitalism and the horrors of war, seen from the angle of revolutionary socialism." This partly contradicts the description published in Timpul daily, which calls Avantajul a retrospective of interwar articles for left-wing newspaper and magazines (recommending them as "social sceneries described with humor and irony"). Another one of Tita's writer friends, Al. Raicu, believed that Avantajul helped Tita be discovered as a "subtle humorist."

Following a ban on all political parties, King Carol II formed the catch-all National Renaissance Front—though Lumea Nouă was still being put out, with Tita as one of the editors. By January 1940, he was also collaborating with the regime's workers' service, Muncă și Voe Bună, being supervised by Mihai Ralea, Octav Livezeanu, and Mihail Sadoveanu. In a 1974 memoir mentioning his encounters with the senior contributor Gala Galaction, he acknowledged that the organization and its eponymous publication had a "semi-official character", but also argued that "the presence of a group of left-wing writers among the editors and collaborators impressed a profoundly democratic orientation on [the magazine]." He also began writing on revues produced by Ion Pribeagu for the Barașeum Jewish Theater, appearing personally on its stage to recite his "causeries" in December 1938. In late 1940, the pro-Nazi dictatorship of Ion Antonescu banned Lumea Nouă, scattering its editorial team. Tita was still featured in the official magazine, Revista Fundațiilor Regale, with translations from French literary classics (Stéphane Mallarmé, Paul Valéry, François Villon) which saw print in September 1941. By 1942, Antonescu had signed decrees barring Jews from working in the press, effectively leaving Tita and others with no income; writer Eugen Relgis, who obtained that they receive financial support with funds redirected by the Central Jewish Office, also reports that Tita and his colleagues were destitute and ailing. In a November 1944 article, Sergiu Dan revealed that a group of Jewish authors—including himself and Tita, but also Camil Baltazar, A. A. Luca, and Isaia Răcăciuni—had continued to write unsigned pieces in various periodicals, of which some which nominally supported the Nazi agenda.

Tita returned to politics and writing after the Coup of 23 August 1944, which toppled Antonescu and his regime, also inaugurating a Soviet occupation. Per his own testimony, just days after the coup and braving bomb raids by the Germans, he had relaunched Libertatea, with Pas, I. Felea and others. On 9 September, the newspaper hosted a debate on the "literature of tomorrow", accompanied by Tita's article condemning writers who had isolated themselves in an "ivory tower", urging them to a political commitment. During November, Răcăciuni co-opted Tita and other members of the restored PSDR on his projected magazine, Intermezzo, but their proposal was vetoed by a Soviet delegate within the Allied Commission. On 19 March 1945, Tita himself became a press censor for the Ministry of Propaganda, answering to minister Petre Constantinescu-Iași and Colonel Traian Ullea; on 31 March, the Ministry of Labor gave him a temporary employment as editor of its official magazine, Revista Muncitorească. From May, he became permanently employed by the Propaganda Ministry's Press Directorate, as the main press secretary. At Libertatea, he wrote about the need for a sustained anti-fascist combat, upon the discovery in May 1945 of an Iron Guardist cell in Constanța.

=== Communization ===
At that stage of his career, Tita was featured with poems in Veac Nou, a weekly publication of the Romanian Society for Friendship with the Soviet Union; rereading these works in 2009, literary historian Letiția Constantin found them to be aligned with the agenda of the Romanian Communist Party (PCR), but not yet up to the aesthetic standards of Stalinism. Thus, she argues that one poem about the "cities of tomorrow" was tributary to "expressionistic imagery", and as such clashed with Soviet demands. Literary historian Eugen Negrici sees Tita as belonging to a faction of genuinely "progressive" and "iconoclastic" poets, alongside figures such as Radu Boureanu, Ion Caraion, Dumitru Corbea, Geo Dumitrescu, Mihu Dragomir, Magda Isanos, Eugen Jebeleanu, Miron Radu Paraschivescu, and various others. As Negrici argues, none of these figures had imagined that they would be expected to serve the PCR's party line, and were simply interested in artistic renewal, with a focus on "real life".

Alongside Ștefan Baciu and Alexandru Talex, Tita served on the PSDR press bureau during the national party conference of December 1945. As "political editor" of Libertatea, he joined a delegation welcoming John Mack of the British Labour Party on his visit to Bucharest, in April 1946. In mid-1946, the Labor Ministry magazine, now called Revista Muncii, featured his reportage about the lives of workers for the state railway company, illustrated with photos by Hedi Löffler and Eugen Iarovici. Also then, Tita produced the verse collection Cântece de suferință și biruință ("Songs of Suffering and Pushing Through"). It was published by the PSDR's own editorial office, and was read by the staff chronicler at Argus daily as a "hymn dedicated to labor and to laborers." The same reviewer noted: "no one else among our poets knows how to be this sad, this melancholic, once they're removed from the realm of love poetry." This book was followed in 1947 by a sketch-story volume, Mai multă omenie ("More Humanity"), recommended by the Ploughmen's Front for its tackling of "everyday life problems" with input from both science and culture. Two other prose collections came out that year: Spovedania unui atom ("An Atom's Confession") and Tălmăciri din cartea vremii ("Translations from the Book of Life").

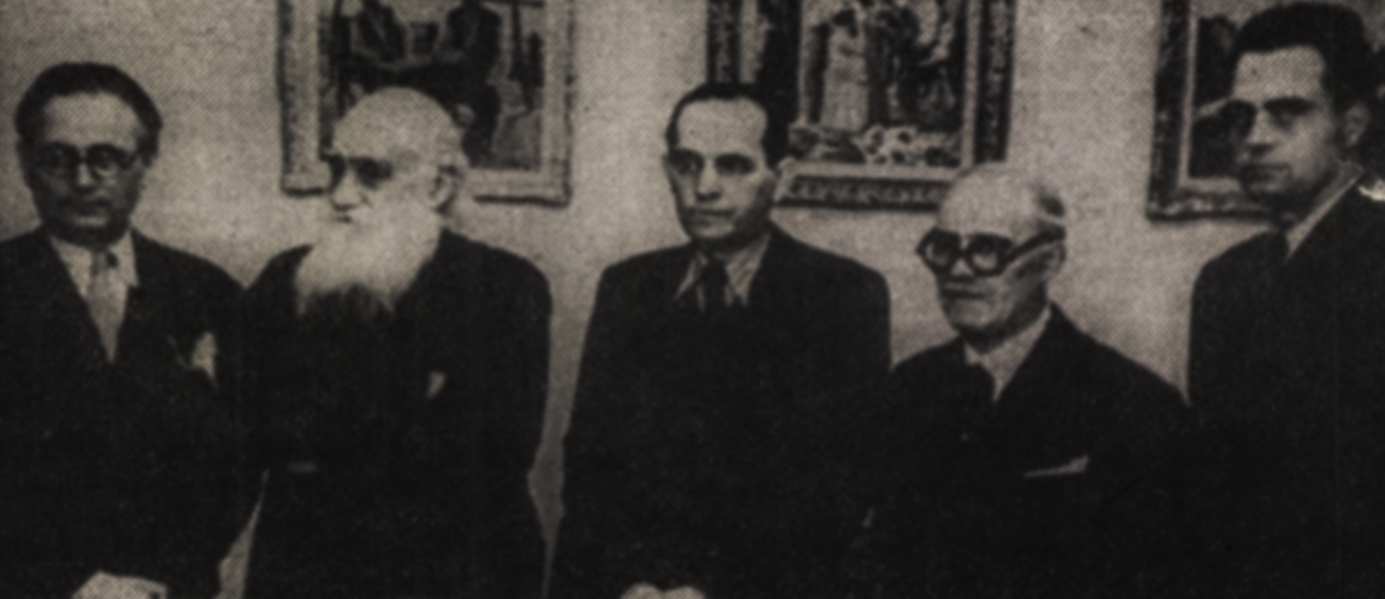
Writers participating in the celebration of Tudor Arghezi and Gala Galaction's 50 years in literature (held at the Romanian Atheneum). From the left: Tita, Galaction, Ion Pas, Arghezi, and Zaharia Stancu

During this interval, in May 1946, Tita had been accepted into the Romanian Writers' Society. He had also spent some time in Bulgaria, invited by the Fatherland Front to witness first-hand the legislative elections of October 1946; he was part of a journalists' delegation, with Aurel Baranga, Paul Georgescu, Costin Murgescu, and Gheorghe Zaharia. In 1947, he and Baranga published poetic homages to Bulgarian Premier Georgi Dimitrov. In November 1946, just ahead of the Romanian general election, Tita was one of the "artistic and cultural personalities" who signed a collective pledge to support the communist-run Bloc of Democratic Parties. From March, he had been active in the newly formed Union of Professional Journalists (UZP), being elected as its treasurer on 4 April.

In 1945, Tita had begun serving in the Ministry of Arts, directly under the PSDR minister—his mentor Ion Pas. He took pride in recounting that their activity as "government representatives of the working class" was directed against the junior King Michael I, going around his "royal strike", seen by them as a challenge to executive power. On 5 December 1946, Tita was promoted to General Secretary of the ministry. That same day, he accompanied Pas to a reception held at Casa Capșa in honor of the returning Romanian writer, Tristan Tzara. In June 1947, he and George Macovescu, alongside Nicolae Moraru, were UZP delegates to the Press Congress held in Prague. Upon their return, they conferenced in Bucharest about their impressions of Czechoslovakia. In August, on Pas' recommendation, he became a Knight First Class of Meritul Cultural Order. From September, he took part in the reorganization of Romanian theaters, which placed focus on a repertoire that would sustain a "moral and spiritual regeneration". Also then, he and Nicolae Kirițescu accompanied Marin Iorda to Iași, installing him as chairman of that city's national theater. Raicu, with whom he vacationed together at a trade-union writers' retreat in Predeal, notes that Tita was "discreet [and] modest" even in his formal capacity at the ministry.

=== Marginalization and return ===
As the PSDR split into competing factions, Tita rallied with the pro-communist one, led by Lothar Rădăceanu and Ștefan Voitec. As noted in October 1946 by Lazăr Iliescu of the opposition newspaper Dreptatea, this entire "Rădăcenist" group could still air anti-government grievances. Tita personally took up the cause of combating hyperinflation, suggesting that the National Bank of Romania was subverting the national economy; Iliescu found his arguments to be untenable and a sample of "economic ignorance", arguing instead that government was not engaged in sufficient deficit spending. Though Tita enthusiastically supported the PSDR's absorption by the PCR (as the unified "Workers' Party"), he was still not trusted by the more senior communists, who feared that he and Pas were using their positions as cultural managers to infuse revisionist Marxism into official agitprop (as a result, the Arts' Ministry was gradually superseded by a PCR-controlled Information Department).

The inauguration of a Romanian people's republic in December 1947 signaled a more accelerated transition toward a socialist state. In February 1948, Tita was expected by the Union of Writers and Journalists' Syndicates to establish his "contact with the working classes". Alongside Jebeleanu, Maria Banuș, Geo Bogza, Ben Corlaciu, Silvian Iosifescu, Eugen Schileru and Ieronim Șerbu, he was sent over to live among the employees of Malaxa Workshops. The communist takeover had also created the conditions for a purge of unreliable cadres. Tita kept his job at the ministry, but only to 1 May 1948, when he was unceremoniously replaced by a more reliable Moraru. This ouster followed allegations of embezzlement, also implicating his subordinate Henri Blazian. The claims, seen by historian Cristian Vasile as probably false, were aired by communist loyalists such as Dumitrescu, Horia Liman, and Zaharia Stancu; Ury Benador was asked to join into the "denunciation campaign", but only stated other, less serious accusations. Tita changed direction, becoming mainly active as a prolific translator—rendering works by Anton Chekhov, A. J. Cronin, Molière, Branislav Nušić, and various others; his other reported activity was as a proofreader and adviser for Pas, who had returned to writing with a set of novels and memoirs.

Tita and Ionel Țăranu co-authored a comedy, Situația Nr. 4 ("Situation No 4"), which was taken up by the Giulești Workers' Theater in October 1948. It satirized the "bureaucratism" of a state-run enterprise in the post-nationalization era. In mid-1949, he was featured alongside Nina Cassian and Victor Tulbure in the agitprop collection Pentru șezătorile noastre, put out by Editura Tineretului. Tita became a productive dramatist for the amateur theaters (as recalled by Raicu, his amateur plays were performed "all across Romania"), with plays that included, in 1950, Comoara lui Lazăr de la Rusca ("The Treasure of Lazăr from Rusca"). Dramatizing a modern ballad by Dan Deșliu, it was officially presented as being about "the criminal actions of chiabur peasants against the working class". As noted by literary historian Doina Jela, it was more accurately about Lazăr Cernescu, a Securitate informant and Lăutar who had been physically liquidated by an anti-communist guerrilla squadron. Tita also produced librettos and the lyrics to agitprop songs. According to Bratoloveanu, the latter activity made Tita well liked by "all generations who either took part in the war, or lived in its aftermath." One of these contributions was Strungul ("The Lathe"), set to music by Ion Vintilă. In a 1952 overview claiming to speak for the socialist-realist establishment, his colleague Dragomir panned the work as a sample of Proletkult aesthetics "drenched" in Sămănătorul-era traditionalism.

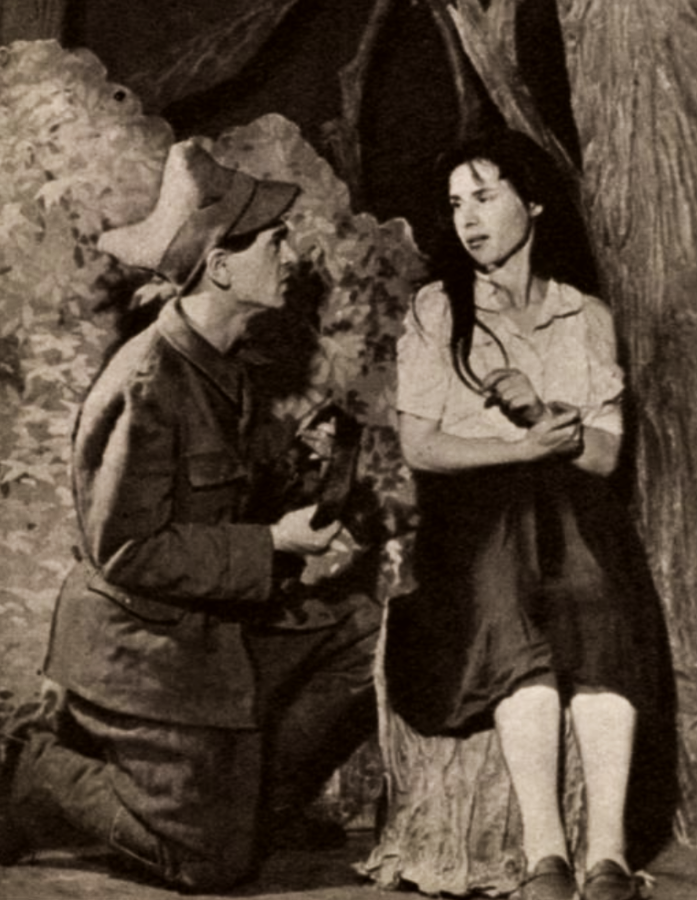
Amateur actors Elisabeta Burețea and Ion Folea in a production of Tita's Într-o seară de toamnă, c. 1961

Two years later, composer Ion Vasilescu praised Tita and his writing partner, Elly Roman, for their "song for the masses", Teoria cocoșului ("Rooster Theory"), which had popularized the tenets of socialist feminism while ridiculing machismo. Articolul 19 ("Article 19"), a political comedy that Tita co-wrote with Țăranu, was taken into production by the National Theater Cluj in late 1953. It received a mixed review from Tiberiu Olah of Útunk magazine, who described as transparently indebted to Ion Luca Caragiale's classical plays (in particular O scrisoare pierdută). According to Olah, it is overall a "cheap farce" in which "only [the character of] Gherasim Nicoară, introduced at the beginning of the third act, is still a lively, acceptable, realistic figure." Theatrical scholar Simon Alterescu made similar comments, arguing that Tita and Țăranu had introduced an "inauthentic" central protagonist (contrasting their contribution to Baranga's "masterful" comedies, produced in the same context). Also performed by the Workers' Theater (with Iorda as stage director), Articolul 19 received positive notice in Contemporanul journal, since it "unmask[ed] the swindles once performed by the ill-reputed political parties of the bourgeois and landowning classes." Also then, Tita and Țăranu were employed to write in revue form for Ansamblul de Estradă troupe, which included Grigore Vasiliu Birlic and Ion Lucian. Their work, Azilul Mac Ferland ("The Mac Ferland Asylum"), was lambasted in the communist press—mainly because, while nominally centered on Cold War-style anti-Americanism, it was in practice about the tribulations of "some insane dame".

In partnership with Liviu Floda, who was recovering from a ban by the communist censors and had expertise in the history of Romanian healthcare, Tita wrote Flacăra vie ("The Living Flame"), with barely disguised elements from the "tumultuous" career of neurologist Gheorghe Marinescu. It was performed in 1957–1958 by Teatrul Tineretului. The theatrical columnist at Gazeta Literară commended the cast for its efforts, but noted that the medically themed play was stylistically and politically unsuitable: "shamelessly utilizing the heritage of ancient melodramas", "greased-up in sentimentality", it only had a "smattering of allusions to our country's political life during the two world wars." Similar issues were raised by Manase Radnev in Contemporanul: he found it strange that Tita and Floda, "two men who know a thing or two about the secrets of dramatic composition", had together come up with "a play that falls quite short of convincing people, and fails to even move them." In his opinion, they never managed to create "any organic link" between the various groups of characters, presenting them almost always in "implausible" situations.

=== Pop-culture career ===
In 1958, Tita alone wrote the "dramatic episode" Într-o seară de toamnă ("One Autumn's Evening"), displaying the fraternization between a female communist, who is assigned to be murdered by old-regime soldiers, and one of her intended executioners, whom she helps with uncovering his own passion for social justice. Tita was additionally recognized, as well as criticized, for his contribution to what was generally designated as "pop music" or "easy listening". He co-wrote a pop hymn in honor of the Soviet space program (disliked by critics for including an ungrammatical line); he and Elly Roman also wrote a song about Ada Kaleh (which became the topic of a controversy after being panned by writer Eugen Barbu). The latter song, which told the love story of a multiethnic couple, was produced by Electrecord in 1959, with Gigi Marga as the singer. It reportedly enjoyed success with the public.

From the late 1950s, Tita's main work was as a contributor children's and young adult literature, with a string of volumes which sometimes branched out into science fiction. Bratoloveanu notes the series for its educational and political qualities, as well as for their reliance on an unsophisticated, widely accessible language. He quotes Tita saying that "the hardest and most complicated thing is to write plainly." An early contribution was published in May 1957 at Editura Tineretului, as Moftulică ("Picky Boy", 1957)—being a parable about "those picky children whose behavior gives them off as egotistical and disrespectful toward their elders." His bibliography includes: Povești din țara poveștilor ("Stories out of Story Land", 1958), Povestiri cu prichindei ("Stories of Dwarfs", 1961), Minunatul zbor al lui Ronț-Ronț ("Nibbles' Amazing Flight", 1963), De vînzare paradisul ("Paradise for Sale", 1963), Elev în clasa întîi ("First-Grade Student", 1964). The first of these reworked a fairy-tale format into lessons about modern life—one story reified Saint Tibb (Sfântul Așteaptă) into a patron of lassitude, who recruited his followers among procrastinating children. Povestiri cu prichindei collected mainly comedic pieces about the lives of children in the 1960s, though with only some vague allusions to their social setting (including notes of life on collectivized land); Minunatul zbor, on which Tita worked alongside illustrator Matty Aslan, was a fictionalized account of animals in space. Another work, Viorel și coana Minciună Mare ("Viorel and Lady Big Lie"), was included in a 1960 anthology of children's theater; it borrowed its tropes from fairy tales to provide young spectators with allegories about the benefits of learning.

Shortly after the launching of a state television network, Tita was called upon to write some of its teleplays. He was involved with the children's Sunday-morning programming, which took up his Mitu-adormitu ("Sleepy Mitu") in August 1962. He was also featured with Obiecte găsite ("Found Objects"), which aired on 4 February 1963—its cast included Mircea Crișan and Gheorghe Dinică. As a sex comedy, it generated polemics; in a June 1963 review for the communist journal Lupta de Clasă, Valentin Silvestru questioned whether the play, which he described as an updated version of the boulevard theater, should have been produced at all. A reviewer at Tribuna similarly panned Tita's humorous verse in Urzica—after reading one of Tita's pieces, which had The Devil tormenting souls by reading them modern poetry, the critic proposed that Tita's own writings could have been used instead.

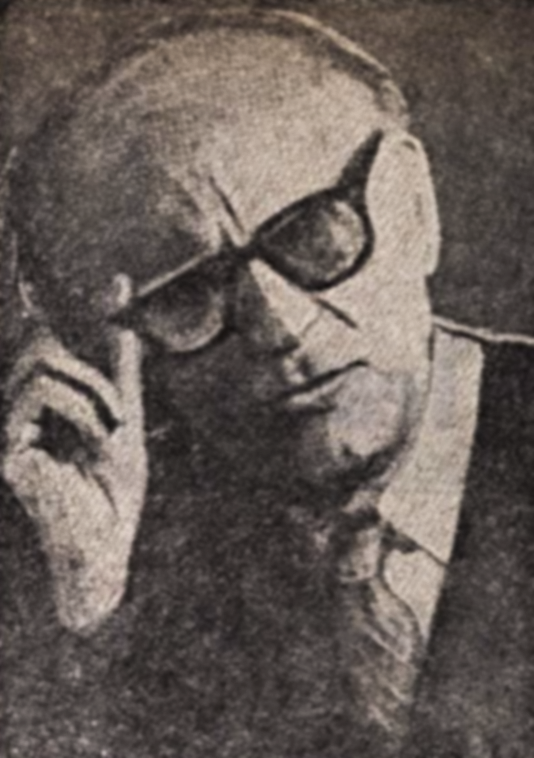
Photograph of an aged Tita (c. 1972)

From the mid-1960s, Tita returned with more children's books: Schițe vesele ("Joyous Sketches", 1965), Pozne și întîmplări ("Mischief and Happenings", 1965), Peștera ("The Cave", 1966), Pirpiric ("Tiny Boy", 1967), Fluturele de ivoriu ("The Ivory Butterfly", 1967), Oglinda mincinoasă ("The Lying Mirror", 1967), Însemnările lui Pandele ("Pandele's Writings", 1967), Gagaga și alți cîțiva ("Gagaga and a Few Others", 1969), Fluturele beat ("The Drunken Butterfly", 1969), Aventurile tapirului ("Adventures of the Tapir", 1969), Robotul sentimental ("The Sentimental Robot", 1972), Noapte bună, copii... ("Good Night, Children...", 1975). Between these was the 1972 collection of rhyming anecdotes, Lumea fără adjective ("The World Without Adjectives"). These were enjoyed by critic Cornel Ungureanu, since, though belonging to a peripheral genre in literature ("essentially journalism"), they matched the quality of previous works by Ion Minulescu and George Topîrceanu. A more drastic verdict was cast by Alexandru Lungu in Ateneu magazine. Lungu similarly argued that Tita's output was on the journalistic side, "having very rare junctions with literature", but added: "The humor (if at all present here) is anemic, the satire discloses [Tita] as a pseudo-moralist drenched in conventionalism. The educational purpose, if perhaps commendable in their initial phase, fizzles out into a sort of pedagogy that has no breadth and no aesthetic crescendo."

=== Final activities ===
Also in 1972, Tita and Alexandru Mitru collaborated on a children's historical play about the 19th-century brigand Iancu Jianu. It was staged by the puppet theater of Bacău, drawing critical praise in Ateneu. With Claudiu Negulescu, he wrote the "patriotic and revolutionary song" Cînd tu, drag partid, ne chemi ("When Thou, Beloved Party, Call on Us"), winning them third prize at a national competition hosted by the Union of Communist Youth (UTC). In tandem, the UTC magazine Viața Studențească gave a poor review to his renewed contributions in Urzica, a series of "arabesques": "We don't set out to deny that Ștefan Tita [...] has any humor, but at least in this case it does not stand out, it is not felt, it is not sensed, it is just not... there." In 1973, a revue and farce by Tita, scored by Elly Roman and taken up by the Ion Vasilescu Troupe, retold the story of Romanian folk hero Păcală. Chronicling a 1974 production of that play by the amateur troupe of Prigor, journalist Al. Bârsescu suggested that the text was "gauche" and unworthy.

Tita followed-up with Culorile nemuririi ("Colors of Life Eternal"), a dramatic poem about the Jewish painter Constantin Daniel Rosenthal, who had played a role in the Wallachian Revolution of 1848. It was used for a 1973 production at the State Jewish Theater. Another work, occasioned by the legislative elections of March 1975, was Pe cine alegem? ("Whom Do We Elect?"), distributed by the PCR to the various amateur troupes in the country. At that stage, Cella Aldea and Vinciu Gafița included his didactic short story, Pomișorul ("Tiny Tree"), in their basal reader. As noted in 2003 by literary critic Ion Manolescu, the story was a "hysterical" sample of socialist ecology, and gave young students impractical advice in matters of arboriculture (Tita claimed that one could cure damaged bark with bandages of dirt).

Tita was also acting as a dramaturge for the Romanian broadcasting company, adapting Leonid Andreyev's Rape of the Sabines into a radioplay (it was recorded in 1974, with a cast that included Coca Andronescu, Radu Beligan, Marin Moraru, and Dem Rădulescu). In a 1975 piece, Raicu noted that Tita, based in a Bucharest home outside Traian Market, was "always working, tirelessly so", and on diverse literary projects. One of his last works was a sample of closet drama, Nestinsul Diamant ("The Undying Diamond"). It told the life story of a Romanian utopian socialist, Teodor Diamant; the September 1976 production by Ploiești Municipal Theater had Eusebiu Ștefănescu reading for Diamant, with Harry Eliad as director. Also that year, a new batch of his science fiction stories appeared at Editura Ion Creangă as Alexida sensitiva (named after a fictional plant which features prominently in the plot). Written in a "journalistic style", these texts showed Young Pioneers grappling with biorobotics and other technological advances of a distant future. Essayist Sorin Titel was critical of the narrative, seeing it as "rather monotonous", "all too evidently framed within the confines of sound educational intentions, [and] managing to stay somewhat pedantic."

During the first days of 1977, Electrecord released Ioan D. Chirescu's LP of children's choir music. It comprised 23 songs with lyrics by Tita, all of them specifically targeting inductees into the new preschool section of the Young Pioneers (called "Fatherland's Falcons"). In February, Tita's radioplay about the peasants' revolt of 1907 was produced by the national broadcasting company. Called Zilele mîniei ("The Days of Wrath"), it had Mircea Albulescu in the lead role. The author died on 1 September 1977.

== Legacy ==
Tita was buried at the Jewish Sephardic section of Bellu cemetery, with a tombstone carved with some of his own lyrics, a short distance away from poet Veronica Porumbacu and cartoonist Iosif Ross. In an obituary piece for România Literară, his colleague N. Sterea described Tita as "discreet, modest, always ready to assist with his words and his deeds", as well as "one of the our prestigious democratic journalists of the interwar period". The same traits were underscored a year later by Bratoloveanu, who also noted: "The sincerity and the noble frankness in confessing his thoughts, good and less good alike, about himself and about others—those were the main moral coordinates of his life."

Tita's book of children's riddles appeared posthumously at Editura Ion Creangă, in 1979. Five years later, George Enescu Philharmonic Orchestra recorded Negulescu's cantata, Neam românesc, neam suveran ("Romanian Nation, Sovereign Nation"), which used Tita's lyrics. Eight of his stories were released as an Electrecord LP in 1986—with music by Titus Alexandrescu and the voices of Silvia Chicoș and Horia Căciulescu.
