= Liviu Bratoloveanu =

Romanian writer and political figure (1912–1983)

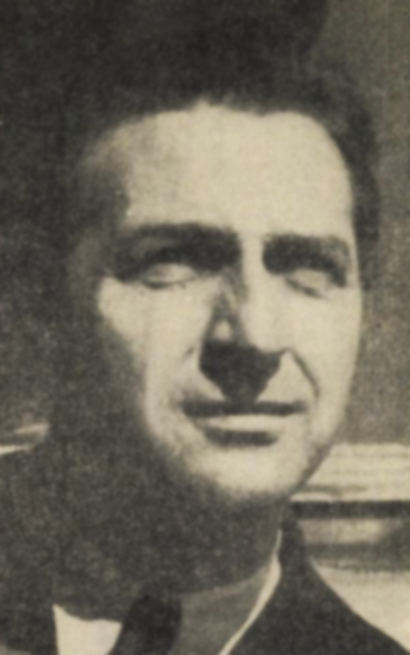
- Bratoloveanu c. 1960
- Born: Vasile Gheorghe Bratoloveanu; 8 August 1912; Turnu Severin, Kingdom of Romania
- Died: 13 July 1983 (aged 70); Bucharest, Socialist Republic of Romania
- Occupations: Journalist; activist; civil servant; dramaturge
- Writing career
- Period: 1927–1982
- Genres: Lyric poetry; political poetry; free verse; short story; sketch story; historical novel; romance novel; police procedural; novella; children's literature; reportage; diary; political drama; historical drama; children's theater; radioplay
- Movements: Social realism; Proletarian literature; Socialist realism

Liviu Bratoloveanu, pen name of Vasile Gheorghe Bratoloveanu (8 August 1912 – 13 July 1983), was a Romanian poet, novelist, playwright, and communist militant. He was a native of Turnu Severin in westernmost Oltenia, an area that remained central to his fiction. During a troubled childhood which eventually saw him abandoning school, he debuted with contributions in children's magazine. In his twenties, he became a full-time journalist, publishing his first volume of poetry in 1935. Bratoloveanu was by then adapting to the stylistic requirements of proletarian literature, and, in terms of politics, moved closer to the outlawed Communist Party (which he would only join upon its legalization, in 1945). A succession of fascist regimes silenced this aspect of his contributions, though he was still allowed to work in cultural journalism—finding permanent employment as a clerk and cultural promoter in the state railway carrier. During World War II, Bratoloveanu may have joined the fascist Iron Guard, an aspect that was expunged from his biographies; he was however mostly withdrawn, working intensely on a series of novels and stories that were only published much much later, or not published at all.

The August 1944 coup, which inaugurated a leftward shift in Romanian society, also witnessed Bratoloveanu's reemergence as a communist author. He finally completed the large novel Oameni la pândă (1947) in which he elaborated on the established formulas of social realism. This contribution received mixed reviews, some of which prompted him to do a rewrite; however, even in the original version, critics noted his talent for grasping the motivations of real-life peasants—as a trait which elevated the work's politicized content. Just months after this milestone in Bratoloveanu's career, a Romanian communist regime was proclaimed. In its initial phase, it promoted him, and featured him as a leading organizer of the Writers' Union. However, Bratoloveanu was eventually marginalized for most of the 1950s, and sent to do work for the Giulești Workers' Theater.

When Bratoloveanu returned to favor in 1958, it was a dramatist, with a commemorative play about the Grivița strike of 1933. In the final part of his career, he clerked at the national film studios in Buftea, where he also lived. He was allowed to return to publishing with short stories, and later with one of three planned sequels to Oameni la pândă and the separate novel Reptila. The reception remained mixed: he continued to be praised for his authentic streak, but generally dismissed as "schematic" or conventionally communist in the bulk of his contributions. With some of these works, he prolonged the echoes of socialist realism well into the 1970s. He died of a disease shortly before turning 71, and was largely forgotten by readers after that moment.

== Early life ==
Vasile Gheorghe Bratoloveanu, the future "Liviu", was born at Turnu Severin on the Danube; his exact birth date is 8 August 1912. His father, Gheorghe Bratoloveanu, was a merchant and one-time municipal councilor, originally from Padeș. As reported by his son, he had passed through Baia de Aramă, which was also were Gheorghe lived in his toddler years, down to World War I. Gheorghe faced financial distress a while after, and separated from Vasile's mother Zoe. She and Vasile lived for a while in Bucharest, the Romanian Kingdom's capital city; this interrupted Vasile's studies at Turnu Severin's commercial school, though he returned in 1927. Also in 1927, he debuted with short prose in the children's supplement of Dimineața daily, and, almost simultaneously, in a similar paper put out by Universul. Young Bratoloveanu then followed up with verse and prose in Veselia, the grownup humor magazine. He quit school soon after, to focus on his writing; a regular contributor to the magazine Cuvântul Nostru and an editorial secretary on Mehedințeanul newspaper (later renamed Nădejdea), he tried his hand as a magazine editor, with three short-lived attempts: Vitraliu ("Stained Glass", 1932–1933), Rod ("Yield", 1932–1933), and Mahalaua ("The Mahala", 1933). Reportedly, he had changed his given name as an homage to a senior novelist, Liviu Rebreanu. In addition to this signature, he was using a variety of pseudonyms, among them: Lică, Vasia Bratilov, Vasigebra, Vasile Turbatu, Vasile Mălureanu, Vasile Prundeanu, Causticus, Ironicus, Coca Demetrescu, Mircea T. Damaschin, Mircea Cantemir, Ioniță Piron, Ady Corolenko, and Ady Stolnicu.

Bratoloveanu's first book of published verse was called Manifest ("Manifesto"), and appeared in Turnu Severin in 1935. As noted by literary scholar Victor Durnea, it was largely a work of "social" and "objective" free verse, with stylistic patterns that borrowed from Aron Cotruș; it thus mirrored Bratoloveanu's prose works of the period, which were generally "analytical". In retrospect, Bratoloveanu accepted his work being labeled as proletarian literature, explaining that he had a "romantic conviction" in denying that the "superstructure" produced during the Romanian Kingdom. He also noted that this impulse closely preceded his established belief in "social justice", and in literature as a "weapon of the revolutionary proletariat". A personal friend of the left-leaning author Alexandru Sahia, he also acknowledged that, in the 1930s, he already felt predisposed toward the then-illegal Communist Party (PCR or PCdR). Manifest also received positive coverage from a literary paper of the Crusade of Romanianism, which had broken out of the fascist Iron Guard and was pursuing its own path in interwar politics. According to this source, Bratoloveanu's poems illustrated a phenomenon whereby the Romanian youth had renounced the "chaos" of fascism and was heading toward "the most righteous point of convergence of various trends: the far-left." This message was in turn covered as an oddity by essayist Eugène Ionesco, who wrote that the Crusade was "confusing the extremes".

Bratoloveanu himself was proud of Manifest being well received by two senior literary figures, George Călinescu and Mircea Damian—though the latter also chided him for being "too left-wing", or "too sectarian". Late in 1935, Bratoloveanu and Mihail Macavei established in Turnu Severin an "anti-fascist committee". They thus supported an initiative heralded nationally by Dem I. Dobrescu, and specifically demanded that Petre Constantinescu-Iași, who had established the original anti-fascist club and was being tried for his links with the PCR, be released from prison. In June 1936, Bratoloveanu was one of the "intellectual and workers of Turnu Severin" who signed a letter of solidarity with the leftists at Dimineața and Adevărul—and against Universul, whose right-wing editor, Stelian Popescu, was depicted by them as a libeler and an exploiter. The young poet was for a while employed by the Bucharest daily Facla, but returned to his hometown as a member of the editorial teams of Țara Nouă and Curentul Mehedințean newspapers. He was courting the fellow leftist Lilly Gogan, whom he eventually married. In 1936–1937, he was again leading his own magazine, called Reportaj ("Reportage"). He made his debut as a playwright at some point during that period, when his Omul care și-a vândut sufletul ("The Man Who Sold His Soul") was performed by workers of the national railways carrier (CFR), and later by a regular troupe in Turnu Severin.

== World War II ==
Bratoloveau moved back to Bucharest, having found permanent employment at the CFR—on whose magazines he also contributed regularly. Around 1943, he was a cultural promoter at Săptămâna CFR magazine, which had contributions from Tudor Arghezi and Alexandru Al. Philippide, and where he also brought in new talent (including critic Al. Raicu). During the late interwar and World War II, his work was also taken up in the central dailies România and Vremea, in the cultural magazine Dacia Rediviva, and in Mihu Dragomir's Prepoem. In December 1940, under the fascist "National Legionary State", he published in the Iron Guard's official newspaper, Axa, an article suggesting that railway workers be required to take regular baths; according to historian Dragoș Sdrobiș, Bratoloveanu was in effect a Guardist affiliate. He began working on a novel, Ugli, and read fragments of it at Sburătorul literary society. His second book of poems, Eu și Dunărea ("Me and the Danube"), saw print at Ramuri of Craiova in 1940, or, per Bratoloveanu's own recollection, in 1942. Durnea reads it as more intensely lyrical, "a unitary poem, structured as the diary of a travel down the [eponymous] river, and, at the same time, into one's own memory." The author himself acknowledged that the book was "toned down" when it came to political messaging, but also that this was due to its publication "under a full-on fascist regime", when "one could not call out things as they were."

In mid-1943, Bratoloveanu attracted attention with a peasant-themed novella, published in Damian's journal Fapta. Fellow writer Ion Caraion noted that this was one of his "so very rare" public contributions, since the author was "hard at work, shunning everyday agitation." Caraion also reported that Bratoloveanu was preparing a collection of novellas, Bunica studiază dreptul ("Grandmother Is Studying Law"). In early 1944, he had additionally completed another play, Femeia domestică ("The Domestic Woman"). It was praised by his colleagues at Viața, which noted that "few plays in young dramatic literature, of those written these last years, have reached its level of quality." They also reported that Bratoloveanu could not find a theater willing to take it into production—but that this was because of the promotional system having been corrupted.

Following the August 1944 coup, which brought Romania into the Allied camp, Bratoloveanu went public with his leftist convictions. He was for a while an editor at Fapta, put out in Bucharest by Damian, later describing his boss as "something of a 'moderate' anarchist who [...] punched both right and left". In 1945, he finally joined the PCR, was co-opted by the CFR's general directorate, and took over as editor of Munca CFR journal. His work appeared in Revista Literară, later seen by cultural journalist Ion Cristoiu as a nucleus of prose writers—also comprising Aurel Baranga, Alexandru Jar, Petru Vintilă, and Haralamb Zincă. All these authors wrote sketch stories on topics provided to them by the PCR, such as the issue of monetary reform; Bratoloveanu's contribution to that theme was about the turmoil of a small-time trader, Costică Balaure, who becomes aware of his pending arrest for price gouging.

Bratoloveanu's political convictions also informed his novel Oameni la pândă ("People on the Prowl"), seen by Raicu as an "interesting fresco of the era". He claimed to have been writing it out of boredom, and to have only allowed friends to read portions of it. They were reportedly enthusiastic, and confiscated chapters that they would then present to publishing houses, hoping to persuade them to take up the whole book. Announced with an unusually persistent publicity in Drapelul newspaper from September 1945, Oameni la pândă finally appeared at Europolis publishers in April 1947. It was the first part of a planned trilogy (later re-planned as a four-volume cycle), all of it centered on his native Mehedinți County—specifically, the village of Jidoștița. Each individual portion was over 1,400 pages long, and together covered the social history of Romania from the Second Balkan War in 1913 to the post-1944 communization. Overall, Bratoloveanu's novel presented as a moral conflict opposing the unscrupulous miller, Onufrie Gânj, to the more idealistic Simeon Armașu; a narrative twist ("insufficiently motivated", according to Durnea) transforms Armașu into an exploiter, or chiabur. Their clash is also one of technologies, between Gânj's safe watermill and a rolling mechanism promoted by Armașu—which is more productive, but (as the peasants are quick to note) also less reliable.

Literary historian Henri Zalis argued that Oameni la pândă was one of the most salvageable Romanian novels of the mid-1940s—alongside Eusebiu Camilar's Turmele, Radu Tudoran's Flăcări, Cezar Petrescu's Adăpostul Sobolia, and George Mihail Zamfirescu's Bariera. These epics are rated by Zalis as evidencing "the will to consolidate critical realism and even to advance, by way of realism, into a new direction". Elsewhere, Zalis explained that he still regarded the volume as aesthetically "perishable", though its "naturalism" remained a relevant topic into posterity. A contrasting reading was provided by the columnist Perpessicius, who upheld the volume as a continuation of "rustic" literature, in line with the Sămănătorul school of traditionalists—but also with selective novels by Ioan Slavici and Rebreanu. He also highlighted a more personal note, which was related to the geographical and ethnographic setting of Oltenia (of which Mehedinți is a component), suggesting thematic links with regionalist works by Ruxandra Oteteleșanu, Victor Papilian, and Ion Popescu-Puțuri.

The unfavorable treatment of many characters caused a backlash in Mehedinți, with peasants who "recognized themselves" in the narrative reportedly filed a class-action lawsuit against Bratoloveanu, asking for 10 billion lei in damages. Perpessicius preferred reading the protagonists as types: seeing Armașu as a version of Rebreanu's conflicted anti-hero, Ion al Glanetașului, he also found similarities between Gânj and the main antagonist in Tudoran's novel. He was impressed by the novel as a "documentary" item, accurate in showing the "inner workings of human nature"; he finds less psychological grounding for the final pages, in which a frustrated Gânj destroys himself and his mill (though he notes that this relative failure is compensated by their "great and solemn beauty"). Durnea commends Bratoloveanu for his good rendering of the "peasant psyche" and for his veering into "subtle comedy", identifying him as a predecessor of Marin Preda.

== Communist takeover ==
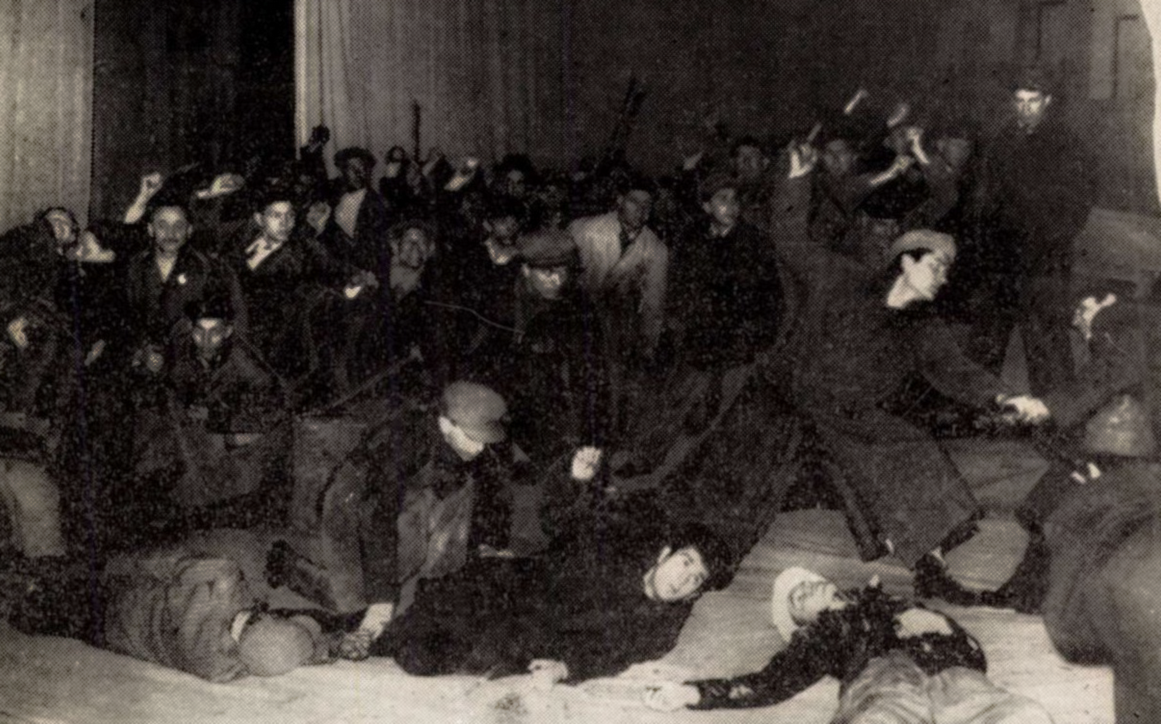
Final scene of Zile de februarie, in the original staging of 1958

Before and after the establishment of a Romanian communist regime in late 1947, Bratoloveanu was a regular in some of the communist publications: Călinescu's Lumea, Flacăra, Gazeta Literară, Scînteia, and Scînteia Tineretului. In 1949, the regime established a Writers' Union of Romania (USR), with Bratoloveanu serving on its inaugural executive bureau. Around 1950, he had fallen afoul of the PCR's central command, finding himself marginalized in literary life; his writings were retrospectively panned by communist critics, with Silvian Iosifescu describing Oameni la pândă as a regrettable melodrama. Bratoloveanu's source of income throughout that period was as a dramaturge for Giulești Workers' Theater.

Bratoloveanu was again frequented in early 1957, when he gave good references to Traian Chelariu, who had been excluded from the USR "due to his past", and whom Bratoloveanu wanted to see reinstated. In 1958, the Workers' Theater premiered his own play, Zile de februarie ("February Days"), which centered on the Grivița strike of 1933. It received a mixed review from fellow dramatist Dumitru Solomon: while he commended Bratoloveanu for "authentically render[ing] the general atmosphere", and for his ability to write in "mass scenes", Solomon complained that the main character, a neutralist-turned-militant, was "predictable". Similar views were held by Romînia Liberă's theatrical columnist, Radu Popescu, when rating Zile de februarie as a "simple and modest drama", "more of an introduction into the so very complex historical tragedy that was Grivița". He described the lead role of Gheorghe Marin (an apolitical railwayman, driven to militant communism by the injustices and squalor of his life), and suggested that his portrayal on stage by Colea Răutu was "absolutely memorable". Eight years later, theater critic Valentin Silvestru recommended Zile de februarie as an exemplary historical play, "dramatically tracing the thorny path trailed by the communists, down to the unforgettable August of 1944".

In late 1964, Bratoloveanu and Ștefan Tita went on a state-approved tour of the schools in 30 Decembrie Raion, lecturing Young Pioneers on literary topics (and, in Bratoloveanu's case, reminiscing about Sahia). He and Tita became good friends, though Bratoloveanu could not recall exactly at what moment in their lives; until Tita's death in 1978, they periodically had "interminable discussions about drama, prose [and] poetry". Bratoloveanu became a clerk at the Bucharest Cinema Studios, and in 1967 was finally allowed to return to publishing—with a short-story volume called Soarele din fereastră ("The Sun in the Window"); he had also completed a radioplay, Omul cu două suflete ("A Man of Two Souls"). Durnea pans such contributions as riddled with the "cliches of an era", in particular for showing the interwar communists as heroic. He also notes that such negative traits are "sometimes toned down by [Bratoloveanu's] humor, stylistic accuracy, truthful framing, and free-flowing dialogues."

By 1970, Liviu and Lilly Bratoloveanu, alongside their son George (a trained engineer) had settled at a country estate in Buftea. Comprising a vineyard used by Liviu for drawing his own wine, this location was immediately outside the film studios—on land used by René Clair in filming his Lace Wars. Bratoloveanu reissued the first part of Oameni la pândă (also identified as Morarul, "The Miller") in 1971, having also heavily edited the original text. As he explained, he took in constructive suggestions from critics such as Ovid S. Crohmălniceanu and Alexandru Piru, and rejected what he considered to be the excessive praise of other colleagues. The book was welcomed by Zalis, who consequently received visits from Bratoloveanu. The two men befriended one another: Zalis, a man of Jewish origins, was impressed by Bratoloveanu's philosemitism, which was directly modeled on Mihai Ralea's critique of "chauvinism".

== Final years ==
Bratoloveanu followed up in 1975 with one more installment of his series, Pelagră ("Pellagra"). Focusing on Armașu's interwar maturity (and supremacy over Jidoștița), it depicted electoral campaigns by the National Peasants' Party, and also caricatured Petrache Lupu's mystical revivalism. Also that year, Bratoloveanu published a standalone novel called Reptila ("The Reptile"). He had also finished, but not yet published, the remaining books of the Oameni la pândă cycle (whom prospective publishers considered too large), and Bunica studiază dreptul (by then a fully fledged novel), for which he had a contract with Editura Militară. Raicu notes that all these works were about "our transforming society". Durnea rates them as fully indebted to the communist "bias" (tendenționism), showing Armașu's complete transformation into an "unapologetic thruster", as well, in Reptila, the moral decline (and eventual redemption) of an engineer, Andrei Moga. Among the critics of the day, Nicolae Oprea described Pelagră as "schematic", with "linear protagonists", "amassing together, in a rather undiscerning way, authentic facts of life [recounted] in an antiquated technique." In 2019, scholar Cosmin Borza rated it as an anachronistic contribution in the realm of "classical" socialist realism, at a time when that current had been relegated to a minor position in local culture. As Durnea notes, Reptila is a more complex work, layered as a romance novel (with its protagonists "kept apart by an ethnic barrier") and a police procedural (though one "infected by ideology", with its central conflict being that of communist versus fascists); its fundamental merit is as a "commendable milestone in realistic, rural-inspired prose."

In late 1975, Bratoloveanu, alongside Florența Albu and Dorin Tudoran, was sent by the USR on an official visit to the Czechoslovak Socialist Republic, attending bilateral meetings of writers in Bratislava. During the final decade of his life, he also remained in touch with the CFR. In February 1976, he was a featured speaker at the commemorative meeting honoring the Grivița strikers, as organized by the railwaymen's literary society in Bucharest. He finally released a fragment of his 1940s novel Ugli (now styled Ugly) in the USR magazine România Literară of August 1978. Called Servieta ("The Briefcase"), it was described by the literary reviewers at Transilvania as a "Dostoevskian" piece with a "ready-made ending". Bunica studiază dreptul appeared as the final Bratoloveanu novel in 1982. Also that year, in order to mark his 70th birthday, România Literară hosted samples of another one of his novels, called Insula scufundată ("The Sunken Island").

In old age, the Bratoloveanus befriended diarist Pericle Martinescu, who witnessed their financial struggles—all their income was consumed on Liviu's ambition to make Buftea into a literary retreat, modeled on Paul Everac and Eugen Barbu's villas (respectively located in Fundata and Poiana Țapului). As recalled by Zalis, the entire literary community knew that the aging author was beset by money trouble, but he himself never discussed this issue. He died in Bucharest on 13 July 1983, "after long and debilitating suffering"; according to Martinescu's detailed account, he was exhausted by surgeries and by overmedication, but mostly morally destroyed by the USR establishment having ignored him and his ambitions. He was buried at Bellu cemetery on 15 July, after a wake in the Romanian Orthodox chapel; in announcing this, the USR described Bratoloveanu's entire work as one of "commitment to the new Romanian humanism." Upon visiting his tomb on the "Writers' Allotment", Martinescu was poorly impressed, since the accumulation of celebrities gave the area "the look of a mass grave". As reported by the same witness, the affair was officially irreligious and "communist", meaning that Lilly had to ignore the Orthodox custom of giving alms. She compensated in August, when she organized a parastas service for her late husband. In addition to the unpublished novels, he had left three plays (including one for children) as manuscripts. Writing an obituary note, Raicu highlighted Bratoloveanu's "desire to be of use to the writers' guild", urging others to carry on his work as a promoter. In a 1987 piece, Cristoiu observed that, although gifted, Bratoloveanu had become "entirely unknown these days."
