= Livy (given name) =

Livy is a given name and nickname borne by:

== Given name ==
- Livy (59 BC–17 AD), Roman historian
- Livy Jeanne, Canadian 21st century country music singer
- Livy Wijemanne (1917–2002), Sri Lankan radio broadcaster

== Nickname ==
- Olivia Langdon Clemens (1845–1904), wife of American author Mark Twain
- Livy Paige (born 1996), English field hockey player
- Livingstone Puckerin (1969–2018), Barbadian cricketer

== See also ==
- Livvy (disambiguation)
- Liviu, Romanian masculine given name
- Gordon Livie (1932–2004), English footballer
- "Livies", fans of Olivia Rodrigo
- "Livie", a pet name of Olivia Walton, a main character on the television series The Waltons
