= Liviu =

Liviu is a Romanian given name deriving from Latin 'Livius'. Liviu may refer to:

- Constantin-Liviu Cepoi (born 1969), Romanian-Moldovan luger
- Dorin Liviu Zaharia (1944–1987), Romanian pop musician
- Liviu Cangeopol (born 1954), Romanian writer, journalist, and political dissident
- Liviu Ciobotariu (born 1971), Romanian football defender
- Liviu Ciulei (1923–2011), Romanian theater and film director, actor and architect
- Liviu Comes (1918–2004), Romanian composer and musicologist
- Liviu Constantinescu (1914–1997), Romanian geophysicist and professor
- Liviu Cornel Babeș (1942–1989), Romanian who committed suicide as a political protest
- Liviu Dragnea (born 1961), Romanian politician
- Liviu Floricel, Romanian football player
- Liviu Floda (1913–1997), Romanian-American journalist and commentator
- Liviu Ganea (born 1988), Romanian football player
- Liviu Hapaină (born 1978), Romanian football player
- Liviu Librescu (1930–2007), Romanian-born Israeli-American scientist
- Liviu Marinescu (born 1970), Romanian composer
- Liviu Mihai (born 1977), Romanian football player
- Liviu Naghi (1929–1989), Romanian basketball player
- Liviu Negoiță (born 1962), Romanian politician and lawyer
- Liviu Negoiță (footballer) (born 1977), Romanian football player
- Liviu Rebreanu (1885–1944), Romanian novelist, playwright, and journalist
- Liviu Tipurita, British film director and producer
- Liviu-Dieter Nisipeanu (born 1976), Romanian chess grandmaster
