= Alexandru Lungu =

Alexandru Lungu may refer to:

- Alexandru Lungu (poet), Romanian poet
- Alexandru Lungu (fighter), Romanian judoka, mixed martial artist and kickboxer
