= Straja Țării =

Logo and badge of Straja Țării

Straja Țării (Romanian - roughly, The Sentinel of the Motherland; also known as Străjeria - translatable as The Sentinel) was a youth organization in the Kingdom of Romania, created in 1935 by King Carol II to counter the growing influence the Iron Guard had over the youth of Romania. Its members were known as străjeri ("sentinels"), and used a form of the Roman salute as greeting.

== Background ==
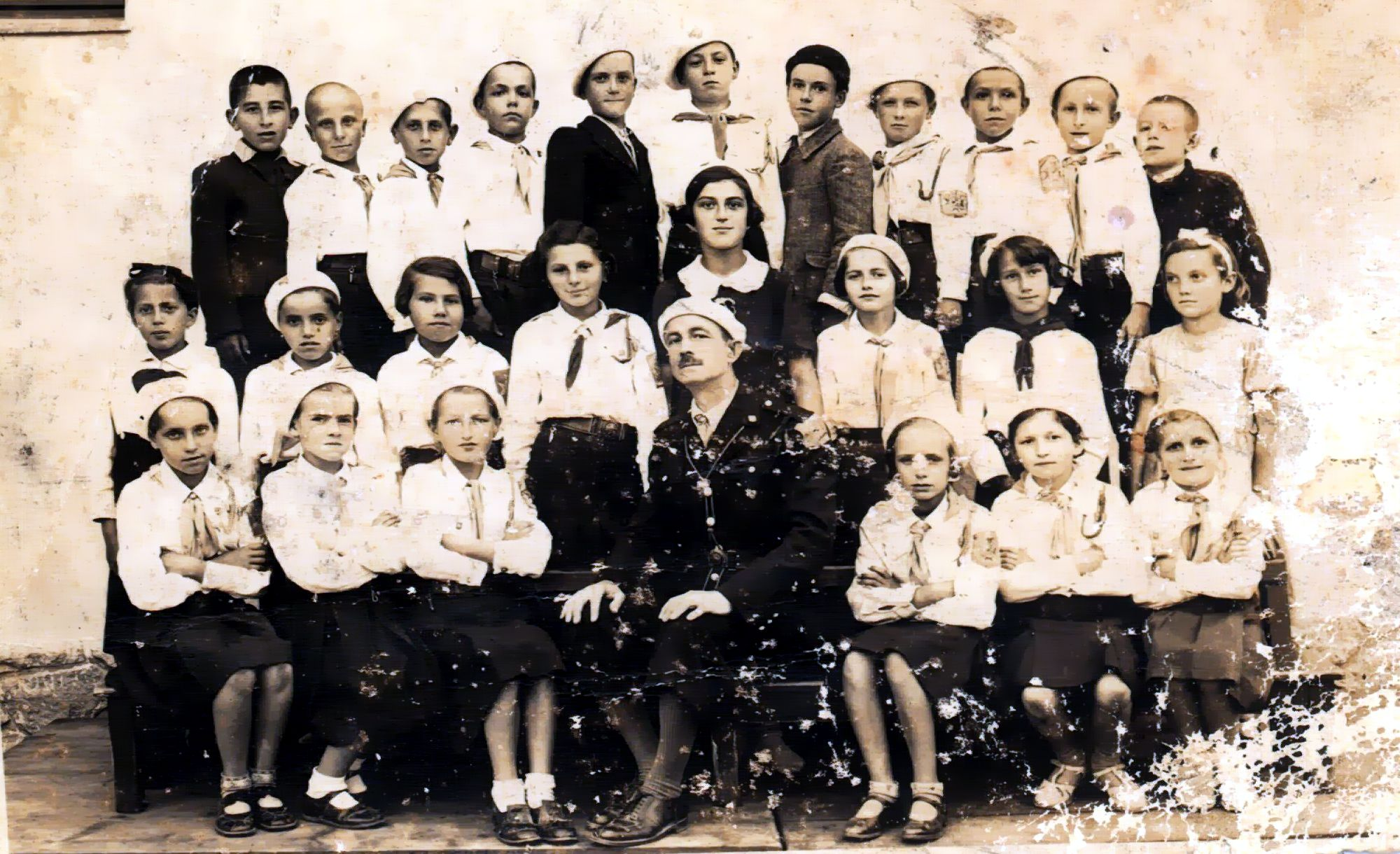
Children in Straja Țării uniforms

The monarch modeled it on the Nazi Germany's Hitler Youth, and took inspiration from other fascist groups such as the Italian Balilla. This shape became more obvious on December 3, 1938, when Straja Țării was re-organized along the lines of Carol's personal regime (see National Renaissance Front), replacing all existing youth movements, including Scouting, and became overseer of sports and all other activities. Although the King was often referred to Marele Străjer ("The Great Sentinel"), the actual leaders of the group were General Teofil Sidorovici and Nisa Cămărășescu.

All boys aged 7 to 18 and all girls between 7 and 21 were supposed to join. A body comprising 18- to 21-year-old boys completed Straja, and it was responsible for offering low-level military education and training.

In 1939 the Straja Țării played a starring role at the "Freude und Arbeit” exhibition which was held in Bucharest under the auspices of Dr. Robert Ley and the "Deutsche Arbeitsfront".

Members were bound by a Crez ("Credo"), which read:

Romanian

Credință și muncă pentru Țară și Rege

1. Cred în Dumnezeu și în Biserica străbunilor mei;

2. Cred în Regele Țării, Marele nostru Străjer, Cârmuitorul destinelor Poporului Român;

3. Cred în muncă și jertfă — închinându-mi întreaga mea ființă pentru ridicarea și propășirea Patriei;

4. Cred în Straja Țării — chezășia Unității Neamului, Hotarelor și Sufletului Românesc.

Translation:
English translation

Faith and labour for Country and King.

1. I believe in God and the Church of my ancestors;

2. I believe in the King of the Country, our Great Sentinel, the Leader of the Romanian People's destinies;

3. I believe in labour and sacrifice — dedicating my entire being to the advancement and prosperity of the Motherland;

4. I believe in Straja Țării — the guarantee of the People's Unity, of the Borders and of the Romanian Soul.

== Disbandment ==
In the summer of 1940, following the cession of Northern Bukovina and Bessarabia to the Soviet Union (see Soviet occupation of Bessarabia and Northern Bukovina), it was employed in an offering help to the many refugees in various parts of Romania. The Romanian Radio engaged in a propaganda campaign, praising Straja Țării as Armata Albă a Regelui ("the King's White Army"), while hiding the fact that theirs had been the only form of aid for the displaced.

Later that year, when the National Legionary State government replaced Carol's regime, after the crisis provoked by the Second Vienna Award (the cession of Northern Transylvania to Hungary), the organization was disbanded and all its assets were taken over by the Iron Guard.

== See also ==
- Pioneer Organization

== Bibliography ==
- Sidorovici, Teofil Gh.; Georgescu, Căpitan Marin I. (1938). Sub poală de codru verde. Manualul taberelor străjerești [Under the green forest's cover. A manual of Străjer camps] (in Romanian). Bucovina-București: I. E. Toroutoiu.
- "Gallery of străjeri parade photos" (in French). Archived from the original on 2007-09-28.
- "Study of official radio propaganda aimed at Straja Țării" (in Romanian). Archived from the original on 2004-10-28.
- Diac, Cristina (2005-08-29). "Mussolini de Dâmbovița" [A Mussolini on the Dâmbovița]]. Jurnalul Național (in Romanian). Archived from the original on 2007-03-13.
- Payne, Stanley G. (1996). A History of Fascism, 1914–1945. Routledge. ISBN 0203501322.
