= Alexandra Sidorovici =

Romanian politician (1906–2000)

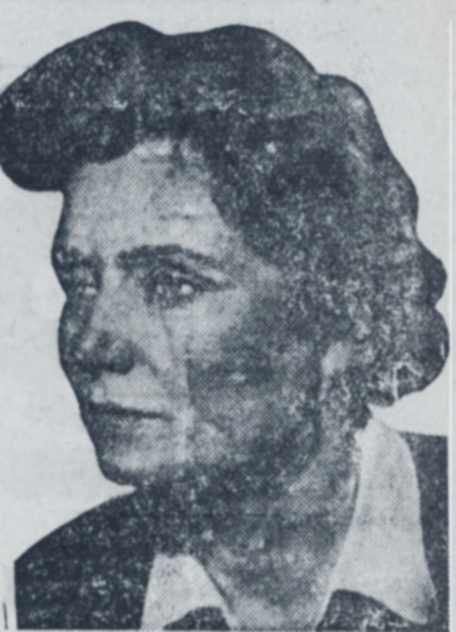
- Sidorovici in 1947

Member of the Chamber of Deputies
- In office 1946–1948
- Constituency: Bucharest

Member of the Great National Assembly
- In office 1948–1952
- Constituency: Bucharest

Personal details
- Born: 6 July 1906 Constanța, Romania
- Died: 25 August 2000 (aged 94) Bucharest, Romania
- Resting place: Vitan-Bârzești Crematorium, Bucharest
- Citizenship: Romania
- Party: Romanian Communist Party
- Spouse: Silviu Brucan
- Relatives: Teofil Sidorovici (brother)
- Nickname: Sașa

Alexandra Sidorovici (6 July 1906 – 25 August 2000) was a Romanian politician. A prominent communist, she was one of the first group of women elected to the Chamber of Deputies in 1946.

== Biography ==
Sidorovici was born in 1906 in Constanța in a well-to-do family. Her brother, Teofil, served as a cabinet minister in 1940 before committing suicide. One of her ancestors was British, and she spoke perfect English. She married Silviu Brucan, a communist politician and diplomat, with whom she had three children. Brucan later became a critic of Nicolae Ceaușescu.

During World War II, she reportedly was implicated in spying activities on behalf of the Soviet Union. In April 1945, Sidorovici was appointed by royal decree public prosecutor at the Bucharest People's Tribunal. In this position, which she held until 1946, she participated in trials of the Romanian political and cultural elite. In May and June 1945 she, Constantin Vicol, Ion D. Ioan and Avram Bunaciu prosecuted a dozen prominent journalists, including Pan M. Vizirescu, Pamfil Șeicaru, Stelian Popescu, Nichifor Crainic, Grigore Manoilescu and Radu Gyr.

In the 1946 general elections she was among the first group of women elected to the Chamber of Deputies. In early 1948, she worked on the merger of the Communist Party (PCR) with the Social Democratic Party (PSDR), to form the Romanian Workers' Party (PMR). Later that year she was elected to the new Great National Assembly, and appointed Secretary General of the Ministry of Mines and Petroleum, a role she held until 1958. From 1949 to 1953 she also served as chief prosecutor of Gorj Region. In 1950 she became an associate professor and deputy head of department at the Department of Marxism–Leninism at the Polytechnic Institute of Bucharest.

Starting in 1955 she accompanied Brucan to the United States, where he was first appointed ambassador of Romania to the United States, and then ambassador to the United Nations from 1959 to 1962. She used the experience as the basis of a book that she co-authored with Brucan (a virulent attack on American institutions). In the 1960s and 1970s she was an associate professor at the Ștefan Gheorghiu Academy, and in 1971 she was awarded the Order of "August 23".

She died in Bucharest in 2000 and was cremated at the Vitan-Bârzești Crematorium.

== Works ==
- Sidorovici, Alexandra; Brucan, Silviu (1962). America văzută de aproape. În jurul lumii. București: Editura Tineretului. OCLC 895479662.
