= Teofil Sidorovici =

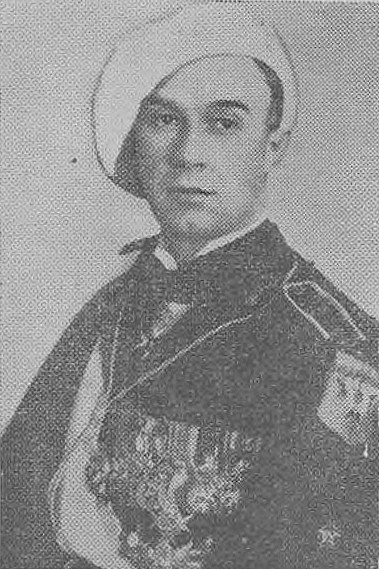
- Born: 13 February 1896; Bucșoaia, Duchy of Bukovina, Austria-Hungary
- Died: 22 November 1940 (aged 44); Bucharest, Kingdom of Romania
- Relatives: Alexandra Sidorovici (sister)
- Military career
- Allegiance: Romania
- Branch: Straja Țării
- Rank: General
- Other work: Minister of National Propaganda

General Teofil Gh. Sidorovici (13 February 1896 – 22 November 1940) was one of the commanders of the Straja Țării (Watchmen), a paramilitary youth organization in the Kingdom of Romania, created in 1935, and Minister of National Propaganda in the sixth Gheorghe Tătărescu cabinet, after the resignation of Constantin C. Giurescu.

He was born in Bucșoaia village, part of the Duchy of Bukovina within Austria-Hungary at the time, now in Romania's Suceava County.

Sidorovici committed suicide in Bucharest on 22 November 1940.

His sister was the Stalinist Alexandra Sidorovici, who became a public prosecutor of the People's Tribunals, an office which allowed her to ask for death sentences for many collaborators of the Ion Antonescu regime; she was a member of the nomenklatura of the Communist government.

== Works ==
- Sidorovici, Teofil G. (1937), Din viața unui fiu de rege, București: Cartea Românească
- Sidorovici, Teofil Gh. (1940), Carol II. Din culmea unui deceniu de glorioasă domnie, București: Atelierele "Luceafărul"

== Bibliography ==
- Argetoianu, Constantin (2007), Însemnări Zilnice. Volumul VIII: 1 ianuarie - 21 iulie și 25 octombrie - 31 decembrie 1940, București: Editura Machiavelli
- Lazăr, Traian (2011), Jurnalul Regelui Mihai I de România. Reconstituit după acte și documente contemporane, Vol. I: 1921-1940, Iași: Casa Editorială Demiurg, p. 130
- Neagoe, Stelian (1995), Istoria guvernelor României de la începuturi - 1859 până în zilele noastre - 1995, București: Editura Machiavelli
