= Stâlpeni =

- Commune
- Location in Romania
- Coordinates: 45°3′N 24°58′E
- Country: Romania
- County: Argeș
- Population (2021-12-01): 4,418
- Time zone: EET/EEST (UTC+2/+3)
- Vehicle reg.: AG

Stâlpeni is a commune in Argeș County, Muntenia, Romania. It is composed of seven villages: Dealu Frumos, Livezeni, Ogrezea, Oprești, Pițigaia, Rădești, and Stâlpeni.

== Natives ==
- Ilie Baicu (born 1974), footballer
- Liviu Hapaină (born 1978), footballer
