= Liviu Floda =

American journalist

Liviu Floda (born Adolf Leibovici; August 16, 1913 – June 3, 1997) was a Romanian-American journalist and commentator.

== Biography ==
Floda was born on August 16, 1913, in Brăila, Romania, in a Jewish family. In 1932 he began his career in Bucharest by writing for such newspapers as Adevărul, Dimineața, Semnalul, and Jurnal. In 1936 he obtained a master's degree from the University of Bucharest and in 1946 both a doctorate in economics and in political science from the same institution. From 1940 to 1944, he was assistant principal at the Cultura B lyceum in Bucharest, and from 1947 to 1948 he was a lecturer at both the Commercial Academy and at the college of the Museum of Science. In March of the same year, he was laid off as a teacher by the Communist authorities after their rise to power in Romania. After World War II, he worked for Jurnalul de dimineață and Libertatea. He could not work as a journalist for some time, so he focused his skills onto co-authorship (with Ștefan Tita) of a play called Flacăra vie ("The Living Flame"), which ran from 1957 to 1958.

In 1964, he emigrated to New York City, where he was hired by Radio Free Europe and worked under the pseudonym Andrei Brânduș. At RFE, he worked with Romanian exiles such as Preda Bunescu, George Ciorănescu, Mircea Carp, Neculai Munteanu, Emil Georgescu, Emil Hurezeanu, Victor Eskenasy, Șerban Orescu, Ioana Măgură Bernard, Raluca Petrulian, Max Bănuș, Justin Liuba, Constantin Alexandroaie, Silvia Cinca, and Iacob Popper. Among the people he interviewed for RFE were Eugène Ionesco, George Emil Palade, Jean Negulesco, Isamu Noguchi, Andrei Codrescu, Andrei Serban, Radu Lupu, and Viorica Cortez.

In 1972, Floda retired from Radio Free Europe, but continued working as a freelance journalist. When RFE got shut down in 1993, he continued working for the Voice of America, and then left to assemble his archives for the Hoover Institution. Floda also worked for the Israeli newspapers Viața Noastră and Facla, and for MicroMagazin and Mele in North America. He was a member of the American Newspaper Guild, the New York Academy of Sciences, and the American-Romanian Academy of Arts and Sciences before he died on June 3, 1997.
