= Liviu Hapaină =

Romanian footballer

Personal information
- Date of birth: 20 April 1978 (age 48)
- Place of birth: Stâlpeni, Romania
- Height: 1.78 m (5 ft 10 in)
- Position: Defender

Senior career*
Years	Team	Apps	(Gls)
1997–2003	Forestierul Stâlpeni		
2003–2004	ARO Câmpulung	26	(2)
2004–2007	Dacia Mioveni	65	(1)
2008–2010	Internațional Pitești		
2009–2010	Alro Slatina	21	(1)
2010	Râmnicu Vâlcea	4	(0)
2011–2012	Girom Albota		
2012–2013	SCM Pitești		
Total		116+	(4)

Managerial career
- 2014–2016: Muscelul Câmpulung (assistant)
- * Club domestic league appearances and goals as of 13:04, 15 June 2021 (UTC)

Liviu Hapaină (born 20 April 1978) is a Romanian former footballer who played as a defender for teams such as ARO Câmpulung, Dacia Mioveni or Alro Slatina, among others.
