= Livy Jeanne =

Canadian country music singer

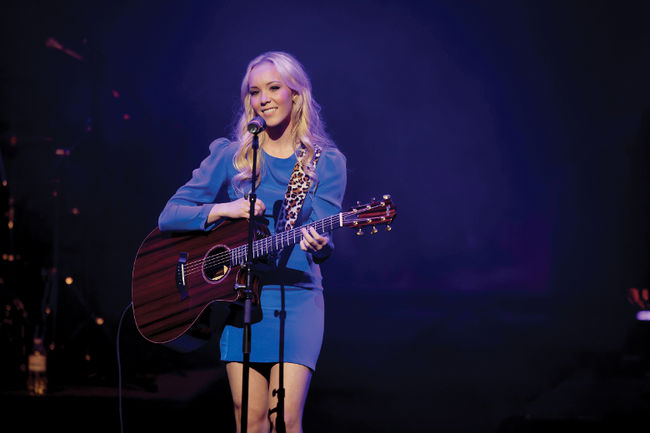
- Performing in September 2015

Background information
- Born: Thunder Bay, Ontario, Canada
- Genres: Country
- Occupation: Singer
- Years active: 2012–present
- Labels: Black Box/Universal
- Website: livyjeanne.com

Livy Jeanne (born in Thunder Bay, Ontario) is a Canadian country music singer.

== Career ==
Jeanne won the 13–17-year-old division of the Global Country Star Search in Edmonton in May 2010. She released her debut single, "Invisible", in January 2012 about her experience being bullied in school. She toured schools across Alberta in 2012 on her You Don't Have to Be Invisible Tour. She was nominated for Artist to Watch at the Edmonton Music Awards in April 2012. In November 2012, she released an extended play, Under the Radar, via Black Box Music.

In July 2013, Jeanne released the single "Any Other Way". It peaked at number 42 on the Billboard Canada Country chart.

Recent songwriting highlights include securing a cut on The Shires album My Universe, which peaked at No. 3 on the UK Billboard Charts. Her song "Daddy's Little Girl" is currently the band's newest single.

Livy's two latest singles, "Wrong For You" and "Easy On You", released July 27, 2018, are a clear reflection of her personality: an unapologetic blend of charm and confidence.

On March 18, 2020, Livy released a new single, Finish This Up and continued her move into pop music from her country music origins. She then released Sharing You (single) on May 8, 2020.

== CMA Music Festival ==
Livy Jeanne has earned the right to play at Nashville's CMA Fest Music Festival two years in a row.

In 2017, she landed herself a spot on the Music City Stage, located in the Nashville Visitor Center at Bridgestone Arena, which showcases some of the genre's rising talent.

Then returning in 2018, Jeanne played the Nashville Acoustic Corner Stage, which was sponsored by SESAC SESAC.

== Discography ==
=== Studio albums ===
Title	Details
Dashboard Renegade	Release date: July 17, 2015; Label: Black Box Music

=== Extended plays ===
Title	Details
Under the Radar	Release date: November 30, 2012; Label: Black Box Music
We Are the Young	Release date: July 8, 2014; Label: Black Box Music

=== Singles ===
Year	Single	Peak positions	Album
Year	Single	CAN Country	Album
2012	"Invisible"	—	Under the Radar
2013	"Any Other Way"	42	We Are the Young
2014	"Wrong Side of the Dirt"	35	We Are the Young
2014	"We Are the Young"	—	We Are the Young
2015	"All Kinds of Crazy"	—	Dashboard Renegade
2018	"Easy on You"	—	Easy on You
2018	"Wrong for You"	—	Wrong for You
"—" denotes releases that did not chart

=== Music videos ===
Year	Video	Director
2013	"Any Other Way"	Harv Glazer/Simon Shohet
2014	"Wrong Side of the Dirt"	Harv Glazer
2015	"All Kinds of Crazy"	Dane Collison
