= Pioneer Organisation =

Pioneer movement in communist Romania

Symbol of the organisation

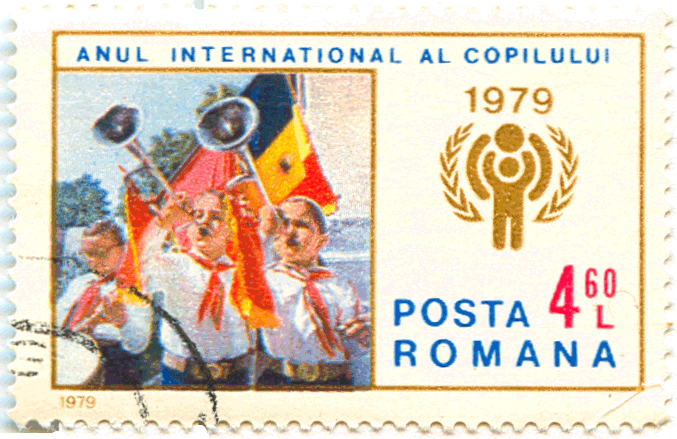
Pioneers on a Romanian stamp celebrating the international year of child

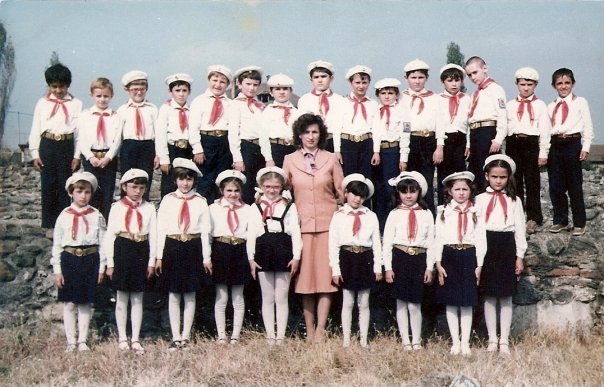
New Pioneers in second grade, September 1986

The Pioneer Organisation (Romanian: Organizația Pionierilor) was a pioneer movement in communist Romania, founded on 30 April 1949.

Most students joined the organisation while in the second grade and remained pioneers throughout eighth grade, therefore, in practice, the normal age range extended from seven to fifteen, or nearly fifteen.

== Mission ==
The organisation's responsibilities paralleled those of the Union of Communist Youth (UTC) and involved political (preparing children to become party members) and propagandistic training for political work, as well as military service. Until 1966 the Pioneers functioned as an integral part of the UTC, but thereafter it was under the direct control of the Central Committee of the Romanian Communist Party. 70 percent of the 9-14 age group, or approximately 1.3 million young people, belonged to the Pioneers in 1981. The organization published Cutezătorii.

The Pioneers ran a variety of summer camps and other activities, also having a number of recreation centres around Romania. For instance, Cotroceni Palace became the Pioneers' Palace on 1 June 1950.

The Pioneers served an important propaganda function, as a central part of their activity lay in mass demonstrations, held on 23 August, 1 May, 7 November, and, starting in the 1950s, on the birthdays of Vladimir Lenin and Joseph Stalin, as well as Youth Day. In later years, three to five thousand Pioneers would be brought to Bucharest (7,000 in 1987), training rigorously every day for a month (two hours in the morning and two in the evening) before their moment in the spotlight.

From 1977, students admitted to the Pioneers came as members of the Șoimii Patriei ("The Fatherland's Falcons") organisation founded in 1976, the first full members admitted joined the PO in 1979.

== Uniform ==
Members wore a small triangular red scarf (with the triangle over their backs), with a red-gold-blue strip outside border (red-gold-blue were, and still are, the colours of the Romanian national flag). Both ends of the scarf were passed through a narrow ring of clear plastic. They also had pioneer uniforms that they wore on certain days instead of their regular school uniforms. When in school uniform, students had to wear their pioneer scarves.

Individual awards could be bestowed on members; these included stripes, along with the titles "Pionier de frunte" ("Leading Pioneer"), "Cutezătorul" ("The Brave One"), "Pionier fruntaș în muncă patriotică" ("Leading Pioneer in Patriotic Work") and "Meritul pionieresc" ("Pioneer Merit"), as well as insignia based on the type of activity. Collective awards came in the form of diploma-like scrolls: "Unitate fruntașă" ("Leading Unit"), "Detașament fruntaș" ("Leading Detachment") and "Grupă fruntașă" ("Leading Group"). These were commonly awarded at the school's annual year-end ceremony.

== See also ==
- Straja Țării
