= Odeon Theatre (Bucharest) =

Theatre in Bucharest, Romania

Coordinates: 44°26′9.47″N 26°5′54.97″E

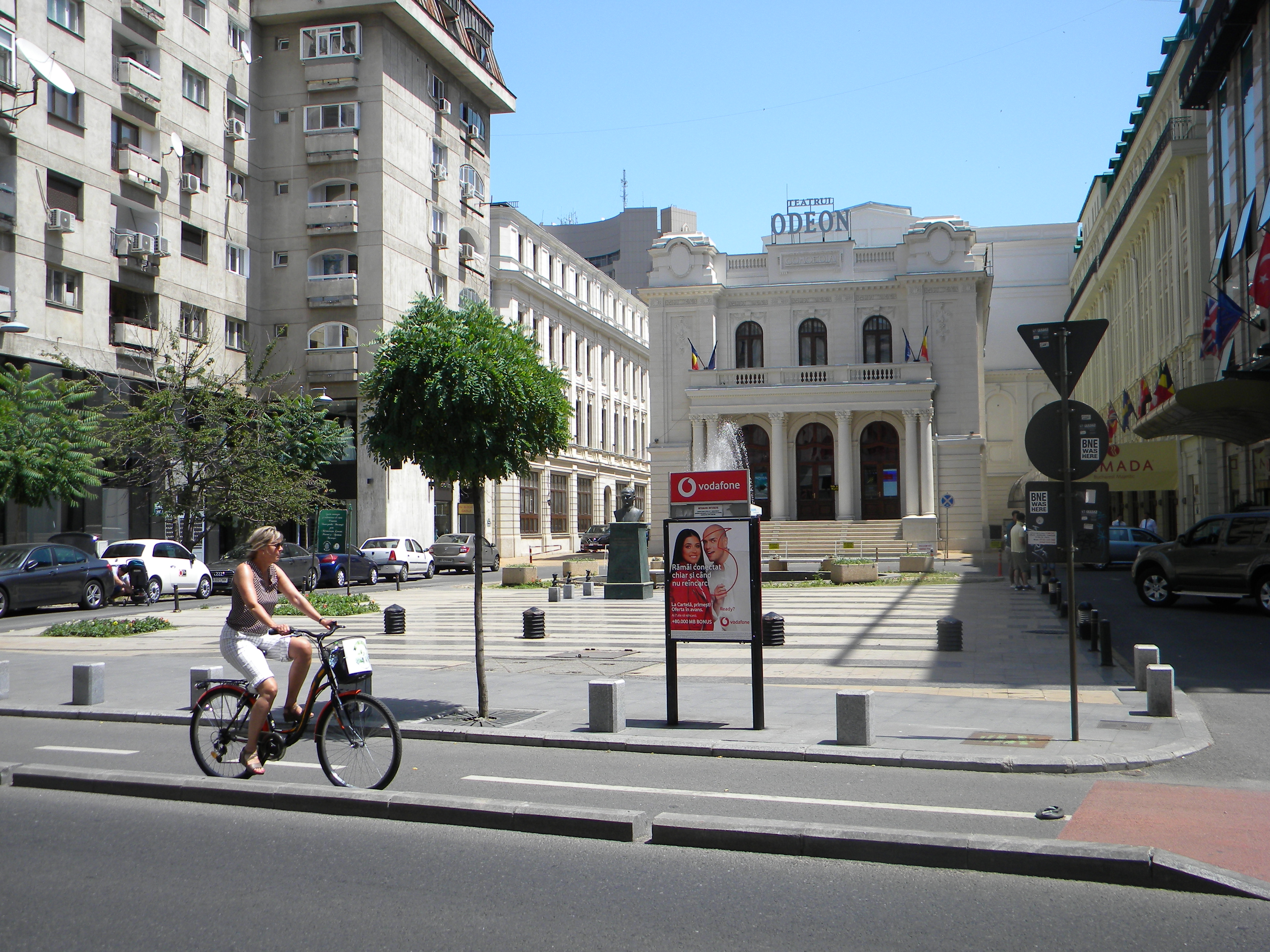
Odeon Theatre in the summer

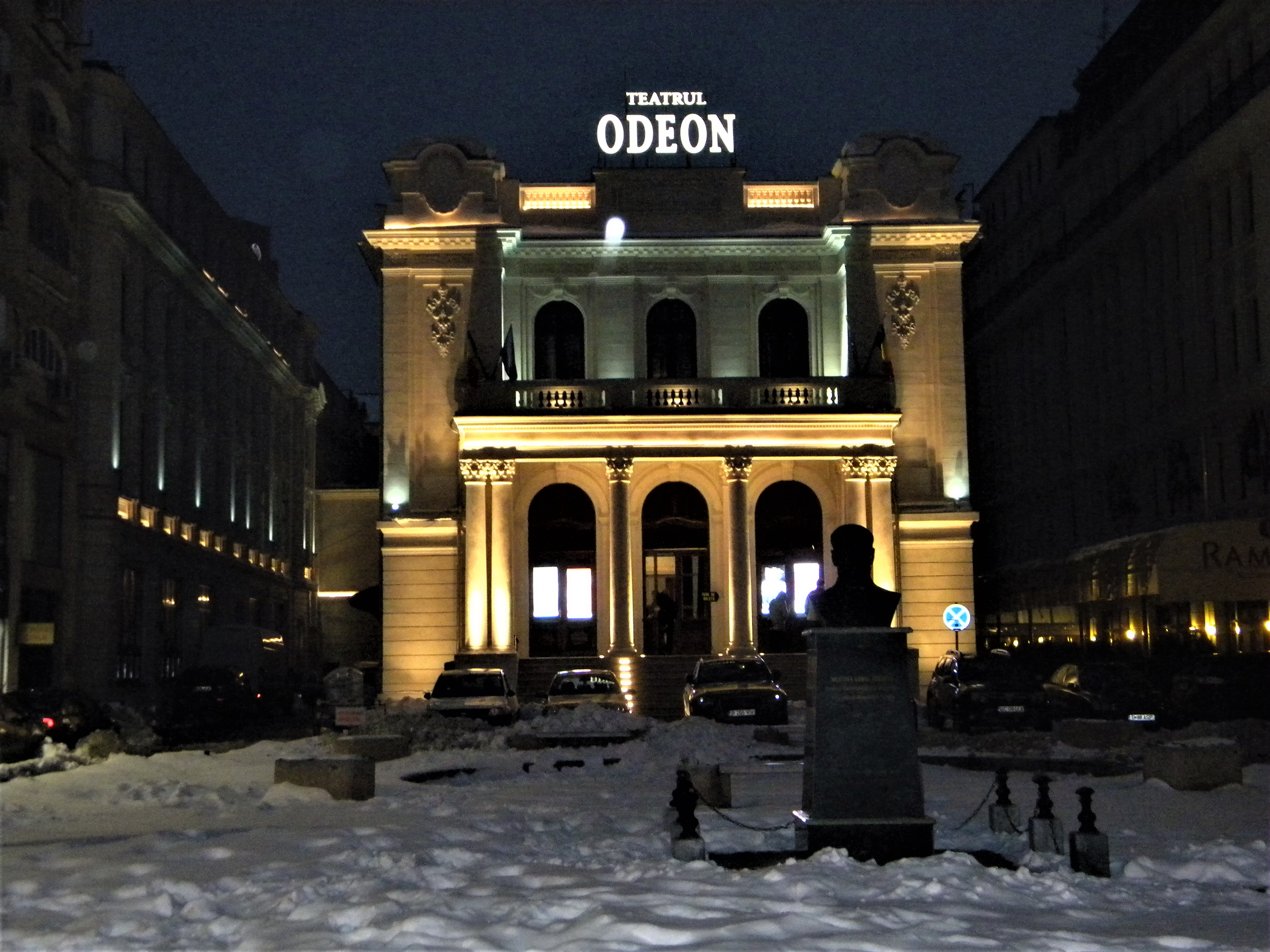
Odeon Theatre in the winter

The Odeon Theatre (Teatrul Odeon in Romanian) is a theatre in Bucharest, Romania, located on Calea Victoriei, and is one of the best-known performing arts venues in Bucharest. As an institution, it descends from the Teatrul Muncitoresc CFR Giulești, founded 1946; it moved to its current location, the Sala Majestic, in 1974. In 1990, after the Romanian Revolution of 1989, the theatre changed its name from Giulești to Odeon. In 1993, it won the Romanian Theatre of the Year Award.

The theatre was built in 1911, and previously housed the Comedy Theatre of the Romanian National Theatre. It is part of a complex that includes a building with apartments and stores (to its north) and the Majestic Hotel (to its south). The Giulești Theatre building is located near the former Valentin Stănescu Stadium (demolished in 2019) and in the immediate vicinity of the Grant Overpass, being built in 1946, supposedly being designed by Horia Creangă.

In front of the Odeon Theatre there is a bust of Mustafa Kemal Atatürk.
