= Alexandru Lungu (poet) =

Romanian poet

Alexandru Lungu (April 23, 1924 – 2008) was a Romanian poet.

Born in Cetatea Albă, he made his literary debut in 1939 and moved to West Germany in 1973. He died in Bonn.
