= Silvian Iosifescu =

Literature professor (1917–2006)

Silvian Iosifescu (21 January 1917 - May 2006) was a literary critic, educator, translator and Romanian literature professor at the Faculty of Letters, University of Bucharest. He was head of literary theory at the university.

Iosifescu was born to Tonya and Pincu Iosifescu, a family of Sephardic Jews. He joined the Romanian Communist Party while it was still underground. He worked for "Cuvantul Liber", an antifascist publication. He contributed in particular to critical editions of works by Ion Luca Caragiale and wrote about the creations of this classic Romanian writer ("The Caragiale Dimension", "The Caragiale Moment", 1963), and translated some of Caragiale's writings into French. Iosifescu wrote commentaries on the writings of Grigore Alexandrescu and Liviu Rebreanu, of some Romanian translations of Voltaire, George Bernard Shaw and others. He also translated prose anthologies of humoristic Romanian and French literature.

During periods of relative liberalization in the cultural policy of the communist regime, Iosifescu abandoned socialist realism and published works of literary theory, such as "Around the novel" (1961), "Border Literature" (1969), "Construction and Literature" (1970), "Configuration and resonance, a theoretical itinerary" (1973) and "Mobility of the view on narrative perspective in twentieth-century prose."

Iosifescu dedicated special attention to literature at the border with philosophy and psychology (e.g. essays, aphorisms, moralizing, confessions), science (science fiction) and history (historical novel, memoirs, romanticized biography, travel notes, etc.). He translated French and English books by Robert Graves, Erskine Caldwell, Romain Rolland, John Steinbeck, and others. He died at the age 89.
