= Alexandru George =

Romanian literary scholar, novelist, and political writer (1930–2012)

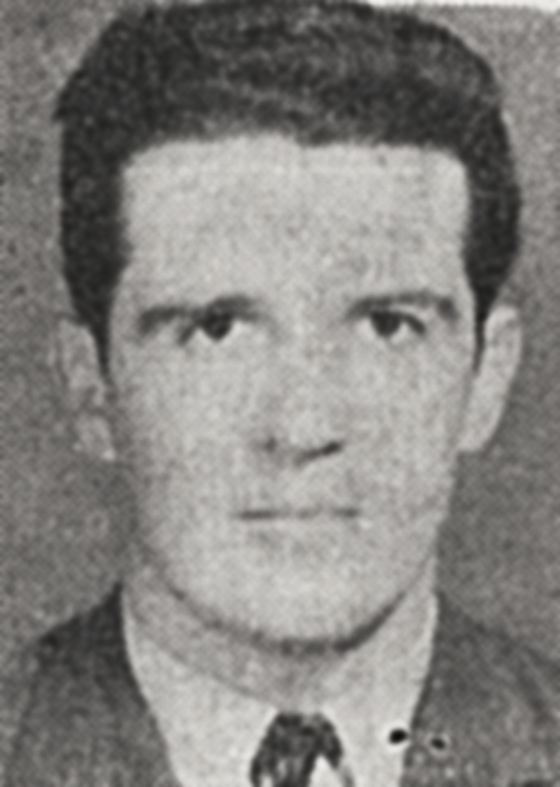
- George in 1971
- Born: George-Alexandru Georgescu; 6 April 1930; Bucharest, Kingdom of Romania
- Died: 28 September 2012 (aged 82); Bucharest, Romania
- Occupations: Editor; translator; journalist; librarian; illustrator; draftsman; laborer
- Writing career
- Period: c. 1950–2012
- Genres: Essay; biography; autofiction; autobiographical novel; metafiction; short story; fantasy literature; romance; social novel; historical novel; war novel; philosophical fiction; diary; comedy; pastiche
- Movements: Viața Românească; Târgoviște School

Alexandru George (born George-Alexandru Georgescu; 6 April 1930 – 28 September 2012) was a Romanian literary historian, critic, and fiction writer, also known as a translator, illustrator, and political commentator. He was always proud of belonging by birth to the upper-middle-classes of the monarchic era, constructing himself an ideological system that combined elements of elitism, cosmopolitanism, and economic liberalism. Such visions clashed with the social agenda imposed after 1948 by the Romanian communist regime. Sensing that he would end up expelled, George ended his studies at the University of Bucharest; he took up unskilled or semi-skilled jobs, managing to survive through the 1950s. Not yet interested in writing fiction or essays (though he had published his illustrations as a child, and also kept a diary), he was instead an avid reader, who ended up buying off, and bringing together, large portions of Eugen Lovinescu's scattered book collection. He only came to literature by way of the Romanian Academy Library, where he worked after 1959; his actual debut as a short-story writer was postponed by another ten years, when he was finally published in Luceafărul.

Upon his delayed breakthrough, George dazzled critics of several generations, and became widely recognized as a highly original voice in modern Romanian literature. Containing his criticism of the regime to where it only appeared as political hints and divagations in his published works, he was tacitly tolerated during the liberalization period. In his critical essays, he ways of reading Lovinescu, Tudor Arghezi, and Mateiu Caragiale; heavily influenced by the latter, his own autofictional, bookish prose was impenetrable to the stylistic remnants of socialist realism, and is often annexed by exegetes to the "Târgoviște School" of dissenting writers (though he himself once rejected the label). George was additionally a columnist at Viața Românească, an editor of various books, a translator, anthologist, and (increasingly after 1980) also a polemicist. His contribution to the public debate became fully political after the fall of communism in 1989, when he undertook a reexamination of the past, with calls for moral transparency. From 1990, George himself was a self-avowed propagandist for the National Liberal Party, believing that its political program overlapped with his own dogmas.

During the final twenty years of his life, George dedicated himself to defending the standards and reputation of Romanian liberalism, in essays that were initially admired for their erudition, but thereafter skewered, or just ignored, for their perceived rigidity. He excoriated both Neo-Marxism and the far-right of Romanian nationalism, mocked the National Peasantists and Transylvanians in general, and created scandal with his pronouncements on contemporary colleagues (variously including Sorin Alexandrescu, Marin Preda, Eugen Simion, and Mircea Zaciu). While increasingly isolated from literary circles, he still earned accolades for his fiction writing—returning in 1996 with Oameni și umbre, glasuri și tăceri, an unclassifiable and massive text that represented his lifelong contribution as a novelist. He died in poverty at the age of 82, three years after receiving an award from the Writers' Union of Romania.

== Origins and early life ==
Born in Bucharest on 6 April 1930, as George-Alexandru Georgescu, the future author descended from the commercial bourgeoisie; both his mother Eliza (née Constantinescu) and his father, George Sr (who died when his son was aged six), were clerks at the National Bank of Romania. From his elders, the boy inherited a sentimental commitment to the old-regime National Liberal Party, on which basis he constructed his lifelong anti-communism. He lived his first years, and all following years until 1980, in Moșilor quarter, near Olari Church, which is also a core setting of his autofiction. As noted by scholar Nicolae Bârna, his entire work and all his mannerisms show him as a "'true-born' Bucharester". He was uncompromising in his views from early on, and once recounted that his own mother had come to see him as "mean-spirited".

Georgescu attended Sfântul Silvestru School (1937–1941), then Mihai Viteazul High School (1941–1946). He claimed to have read "all of what there was to read in Romanian literature" before the age of nineteen, and to have penetrated other literatures before the age of thirty, by which time he was mostly engaged in philosophy (since "my ideas about literature [had] already crystallized"). By 1957, the political prose and theory he had read, and had been influenced by, included tomes by Guglielmo Ferrero, Walter Lippmann, Francesco Saverio Nitti, José Ortega y Gasset, Hermann Rauschning, Max Scheler, and Oswald Spengler. Later in his life, he always read new books, but avoided writing about them, so as to gain perspective; instead, he made a point of rereading the forgotten classics (like Ion Heliade Rădulescu) and the obscure rarities, including novels by Constantin Barcaroiu and N. Porsenna. By 1960s, he had purchased many volumes once owned by Eugen Lovinescu, the prestigious interwar culture-critic who became his intellectual model.

Georgescu grew up during the Ion Antonescu regime (1940–1944), which aligned Romania with Nazi Germany. Though he derided its far-right ideology, he was adamant that Antonescian guidelines in the field of culture were much less oppressive than the "unified front" imposed by the communist regime in the 1950s. Around 1943 (at the height of World War II), Georgescu was first published as an illustrator, rather than as a writer, after his sketches were accepted by the children's supplement of Universul, which was at the time managed by Mihai Gafița. George noted this as one of the "strange coincidences" tying him to Gafița, who was his literary editor and neighbor, while remaining his ideological enemy throughout. Young Georgescu did not graduate immediately, due to health issues, and was sent to recover near Târgoviște, where he lived with one of his relatives. He returned to Bucharest in 1947, taking his Romanian baccalaureate in 1949. His final school-year witnessed communist consolidation, which, at that stage, had set itself the goal of marginalizing people of "unhealthy social origin". Young Georgescu managed to enlist at the University of Bucharest department of philology, but left voluntarily in 1950—having realized that his expulsion on political grounds was imminent; as fellow critic Mihai Zamfir argues, he was at risk of being eliminated physically, along with "all those like him". He remained discreet about his "self-taught" status, but confessed to those in the know that he had never even attended class while enlisted.

Georgescu worked as a day laborer, before finding more gainful employment as a draftsman for a construction institute. He resigned in 1955, and until 1957 had no steady job, afterward earning his living as editor and translator for an engineer's syndicate. During his expeditions around semi-clandestine antiquarian bookshops, he befriended one of the sellers, the former far-right journalist Arșavir Acterian, who had spent time in communist prisons. Their contacts ceased in 1959, when Acterian was arrested a second time (there followed an imprisonment from which he returned an ill man, offering to sell his own collection of books to several friends, Georgescu included).

== Breakthrough ==
From 1959 to 1972, Georgescu was at the Romanian Academy Library—initially as a regular librarian, brought there after the literary doyen Tudor Vianu had interceded on his behalf. His literary debut only came in 1969, with a short story published in Luceafărul after approval by its chief editor, Ștefan Bănulescu. In his local context, Georgescu became famous for his generational misalignment: though he arrived in Romanian literature at roughly the same time as Paul Goma, Zigu Ornea and Titus Popovici, he saw himself (and was also seen by Zamfir) as ideologically tied to men of the wartime generation—from Dinu Pillat to Constant Tonegaru, from Pavel Chihaia to Eugen Ivănescu. He took additional pride in being one of the trans-generational "cautiously late bloomers", in the same category as Leonid Dimov, Mircea Ivănescu, and Mircea Horia Simionescu, with whom he also shared a passion for elaborate pastiche and metafiction. Zamfir believes that he averted persecution and even physical annihilation (Tonegaru's fate) in the 1940s and 1950s, finding an "honorable exit". This implied that he demanded very little of society, also that he never bowed down to the censorship apparatus. In turn, Zamfir notes, government tolerated a number of "allusions" that appeared in his work—and especially in his patented "small, bookish fiction" (a genre selected precisely because of its unsuitability with socialist realism).

Georgescu, after living as a social marginal, began being published during an episode of relative liberalization, coinciding with the rise of Nicolae Ceaușescu as the regime leader. As retrospectively argued by scholar Tudor Cristea, the very fact that his prose was printed evidenced that the "short-lived ideological 'thaw'" was reaching its apex. A friendly author, Gheorghe Grigurcu, observes that liberalization and its limits were being alluded to within Georgescu's own essays, which mentioned that Lovinescu was being republished, but with piousness rather than as a "generative" influence. As "Alexandru George" (a pseudonym constructed from his two Christian names), he was almost immediately brought into the cultural environment of the 1970s, being recognized for his work as a critic and essayist. His first contributions here date to 1970, when his essay on Tudor Arghezi came out to much acclaim—almost at the same time as his short-story collection, Simple întîmplări cu sensul la urmă ("Simple Accounts That Will Only Make Sense at the End"). George once thanked Gafița for having a decisive role in his literary breakthrough, by approving his books for print—though he believed that Gafița had never fully read them, he credited him with enough flair to "discover within them the very things that could help speed up the editorial process."

At Contemporanul, Nicolae Manolescu welcomed Simple întîmplări as a "subtle and charming book". Its fantasy-like accounts, the critic noted, were sometimes comedic and sometimes tragic, generally modelled on the prose of Auguste Villiers de l'Isle-Adam, and possibly also Jorge Luis Borges; they all included a thesis, which was then contradicted by illogical and ineffable occurrences. The Villiers model is also noted by scholar Eugen Negrici—alongside modulated echoes of the Gothic novel, of Mircea Eliade's short prose, and of Mateiu Caragiale's Craii de Curtea-Veche. Overall, the works are "pastiches and paraphrases on classical themes", tapping into "the huge reservoir of our cultural memory". Though a Bucharester, his literary style drew comparisons with the "Târgoviște School", established in the same period by Simionescu and Radu Petrescu. George had a lasting feud with Petrescu, who nevertheless wanted him annexed to the current, alongside Dan Culcer; in 1991, after discovering that Petrescu had once depicted him as one of the participants in communist censorship, he formally demanded that "I am extracting myself, urgently and as categorically as possible, from this 'Târgoviște School'." He still continued to be regarded as a major contributor to that literary nucleus—as for instance by Simionescu, by Negrici, or by editor and novelist Gheorghe Crăciun, who wanted to publish him in the same anthologies as Petrescu.

Meanwhile, in his critical commentary, George stood out against the dominating trend: according to Negrici, most of his colleagues were indebted "in shameful measure" to the philological works of George Călinescu, and George refused to accept that overwhelming influence. Overall, he established himself as an intellectual heir to Lovinescu and Șerban Cioculescu (though, as critic Al. Dobrescu cautioned in 1975, he is cannot be reduced to the status of a "Lovinescian" author, other than strictly in matters of ethics). George's Arghezi book, centered on the poet's reception by his contemporaries, was seen by many as startling, since it challenged some of the prevailing orthodoxies. As observed by writer Paul Georgescu, he had a sophisticated method, the sign of a "refined and somber taste", which allowed him to explore Arghezi as the poet of "disorder", whose entire creation revolved hopelessly around an existential drama. Overall, the very choice of subject seemed to be provocative: "The magus Arghezi is out of fashion. Al[exandru] George is a man who seeks battles worthy of his mettle, choosing his most fastidious hero during the most eclipsed hour of his most whimsical trajectory."

== Lionized iconoclast ==
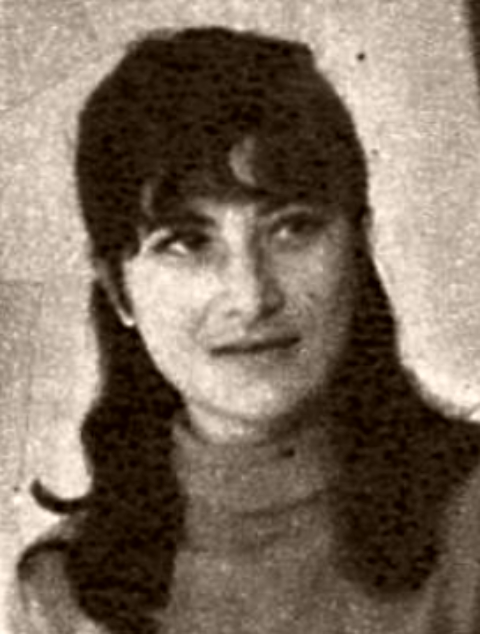
Gabriela Melinescu, whom George was courting in the late 1960s

Iconoclasm became a constant in George's analytical stance. A younger scholar, Mircea Popa, noted in retrospect: "Alexandru George aims to demonstrate with every book he writes that an author or a literary work can always be read in a new light—that within its very substance there is enough evidence to challenge deeply rooted perceptions". Several volumes of essays came in quick succession. Two were published in 1971: Clepsidra cu venin ("An Hour-glass of Venom"), Semne și repere ("Signs and Markers"). They were followed in 1973 by the first volume of a series, La sfârșitul lecturii ("As I End My Reading"), with the third and final volume appearing twenty years later.

Despite his now-stable success, George seemed out of touch with the relative prosperity engendered by market socialism. At Luceafărul, he came to romantically pursue poet Gabriela Melinescu, provoking her laughter when he presented her with a cooking pot and a saucepan as gifts—something which would have been appropriate in the 1950s. He also dressed and behaved unostentatiously: his colleague and friend Gelu Ionescu saw him in an "eternal" cardigan and a tie "of the most doubtful color", and recalls that he spoke of his favorite subjects in a way that seemed "bewilderingly unconvincing, as if he were always supporting something that had been definitely disputed". Another one of his closer associates, Barbu Cioculescu, observed that his texts were often qualified by mitigating and subjective expressions, but that these were showing George's "profound interest in himself", rather than shyness; in Cioculescu's view, George was "a loner" touched by melancholy, who exteriorized himself only in his writing. Here, he often veered into cruelty, attracting "irreconcilable adversities"; over time, his peers took revenge by choosing to ignore his novelistic output. As Ionescu notes, he was not just "anachronistic", but also "distant, discreet and disparaging", ready to make himself disliked by many of his peers, and "always sulky, even when receiving praise." He was never available on weekends, for reasons that he never explained to any of his friends.

After having had his break, George published scores of books of essays and translations, also becoming a regular in Writers' Union (USR) magazines: România Literară, Contemporanul, and especially Viața Românească—where, in the 1980s, he had a column that chronicled new essays and works of literary criticism. Press historian Victor Durnea mentions him as one of the most active writers for that publication in the 1971–1980 period. Later in life, George dispelled claims that he had ever been salaried at Viața Românească, noting that his voluntary work consisted in "arranging texts" for it and its sister publication, Caiete Critice. He and Ionescu became close while frequenting the twin offices. George made a habit of stridently mocking the new generation of literary professionals (namely, those who had made their peace with the regime, and published under its aegis, without necessarily endorsing its literary canon), but did not prevent them from being published.

Overall, George and Ionescu had an agreement that they would not use their positions to engage in a conflict with the Romanian Communist Party, however much they resented its "potboilers". The communist state never granted George a Romanian passport, thus preventing him from visiting writers in the diaspora. Ionescu believes that such precautions were "entirely stupid", since George had no intention of defecting: "he could only ever be a Bucharester, and could only ever endure as one". As observed by Manolescu, he loved Bucharest so much that, while running for election as head of the local Writers' Association, he used his speaking time to ridicule the members for being mostly immigrants to the capital, "unable to tell even where the writers are buried in Bellu Cemetery." As a result, he only took five votes—the same as Eugen Barbu, "whom just about everyone hated."

George's forays into the major schools of Western literary criticism began in 1972, when he translated Paul van Tieghem's Grandes doctrines littéraires en France; he followed up in 1974 with Jean Starobinski's Relation critique (here, the introduction was penned by a local comparatist, Romul Munteanu), and in 1975 with a grouping of Remy de Gourmont's essays. Between these, in 1973, he translated and prefaced Villiers' Histoires insolites and Contes cruels, as a single volume. With a 1975 book entirely about Lovinescu, George made his intellectual affiliations clear, but (as Bârna claims) operated "with a critical spirit unclouded by hagiography", describing his master as an important practitioner of the critical craft (while eschewing Lovinescu as a theorist). George was more subtly speaking about the interwar theorist as an exponent of art for art's sake, opposing him to the scientism of his contemporaries (with D. Caracostea upheld as one of the more indigestible samples of the latter). In Grigurcu's interpretation, this was also a jibe at George's own "scientific" rivals, especially the semioticians; in a contrasting note, mathematician and essayist Solomon Marcus treasured George himself for having poured "lots of science" in his critique, and as such for being similar to the semioticians. George was enthusiastic at rediscovering the early Lovinescian works, and attempted to dissuade readers from seeing Lovinescu exclusively as a disciple of Titu Maiorescu—instead, he read Lovinescian guidelines as a local answer to Henri Bergson's intuitionism. Himself a Lovinescu disciple, and honored as such in the book itself, Manolescu was perplexed by the core message. He now parted ways with George, arguing that there was no "other Lovinescu" to be found.

== Final communist decade ==
In 1976, George edited and prefaced a definitive collection of works by V. A. Urechia. This was followed in 1978 by a similarly prepared print of Pompiliu Eliade's Ce este literatura?. Both were gestures of recovery: George believed that Urechia had been maligned by Maiorescu, and then unfairly forgotten; he also stood up for Eliade, whom Lovinescu had snubbed, although they resembled each other perfectly in their ideological outlook. In addition to leading these efforts of local rediscovery, he translated and edited (for Editura Univers) a selection from Anatole France's Vie littéraire columns, and was congratulated for it by art historian Dan Grigorescu.

George's study of novelist Mateiu Caragiale, appearing in 1981, centered on correcting errors of interpretation and chronology, challenging clichés and opening new venues for Caragialesque exegesis; in his overview, Bârna rates it as a sample of George's "fundamentally polemical psyche". Several colleagues regard this volume as his masterpiece—not least of all, because George identified spiritually with his subject. Dan Ciachir of Săptămîna saw it as significantly better "in taste and reasoning" than previous Mateiu monographs, by Ovidiu Cotruș and Marian Papahagi, though he was puzzled by George's pronouncements on Caragiale's supposed humorlessness. According to Zamfir, Mateiu was also "reborn" in George's fiction, which, like Craii de Curtea-Veche, showed "an uncertain, ghostly, decrepit yet magnetic Bucharest—its allure deepened by a style both enveloping and uniquely George's own." The prose collection Simple întîmplări în gînd și spații ("Simple Goings-on of Thought and Space"), published in late 1982, impressed fellow novelist Florin Mugur with its depiction of the city, in episodes move, in a subdued style, "beyond the borders of the miraculous". According to Mugur, this volume showed that George was ready to write "a book of foremost importance in our literature."

From 1982 to 1992, George worked on several volumes of Lovinescu's complete works, also putting out an anthologies—of Romanian fantasy literature (1982), of Mateiu's writings (1985), and of humorous prose (also 1985). In a 1984 novel, called Caiet pentru... ("My Notebook for..."), George alluded to his adolescence in Târgoviște. Superficially a romance, its structure borrowed from modernist novels by George Călinescu and Camil Petrescu. It is thus build around a found manuscript, which allows visitations into the recent past, as a two-layered sentimental biography. Simionescu sees it as a manifestation of the Târgoviște-group prose, with its "scattered" autobiographical clues—here presented with slightly more "intention of systematization" than in other novels produced by "the School".

As noted by reviewer Ștefan Borbély, George was a link between the Târgoviște-era authors and the Optzeciști generation of late communism. Himself a member of the latter cohort, Borbély called him a "discreet master" in the realm of autofiction. George claimed that, already during Ceaușescu's final years, he had stood up against a cultural trend that had elevated Marin Preda (deceased in 1980) into the Romanian literary pantheon. Against his peers, he described Preda's final book, Cel mai iubit dintre pământeni, as "shameful"—while his opinion on this issue became widely known in the 1990s, he reported having first stated it at the USR "at some point in the mid-1980s". He set out to prove that Cel mai iubit was a collection of facile stock devices, of pornographic details, and of the kind of pseudointellectualism that only revealed Preda's own limits in cultural cognition. Elsewhere, he described Preda's sketch of peasant life, Calul, as "a concentration of absurdities and wanton, purely demonstrative cruelties", the kind that "could never have unfolded in an environment that is even minimally normal". Such radical pronouncements puzzled a younger critic, Vasile Spiridon, who set out to prove that the scene was plausible. His generic conclusion was that George could only treat Preda with "visceral hatred", and was therefore immune to reason on this subject.

== Revolution and PNL association ==
Following the Romanian Revolution of 1989, George could make his debut as a political journalist. In early 1990, he was present at the Group for Social Dialogue, where he criticized scholars who wished to gloss over the communist-era compromises made by authors such as Arghezi and Mihail Sadoveanu. With a string of articles in România Liberă daily, he was simultaneously questioning some of the emerging orthodoxies on the right: George refused to credit monarchist ideals, suggesting that Michael I had lost his role as an arbiter; he denied that the revolution had created too many new parties, suggesting that hundreds more could be created, at no harm to the political system; and, finally, he refused to identify Ceaușescu as the embodiment of evil, reminding Romanians that they had had it worse under Gheorghe Gheorghiu-Dej.

Though he never formally joined any of the new political groups organizing in the open, George had a visible sympathy for the new National Liberal Party (PNL), remaining surly, uncompromising, in his critique of intellectuals who had joined other political causes. In one of his texts of the 2000s, he recalled that, back in 1990, a group of PNL men, including Dan Amedeo Lăzărescu, had asked him to "disseminate liberal ideas", and that he had accepted. Thematically, his work diversified, now comprising moralizing essays and social-themed critique, many of which were included in volumes alongside his more conventionally literary essays; virtually all of them, beginning in 1994 with Capricii și treceri cu gândul prin spații ("Vagaries and Thoughts Drifting through Space"), appeared at Editura Albatros.

These new works fully developed hints found in his earlier books, where he had managed to insert passages about political topics—including, for instance, details on Maiorescu's brand of conservatism. Though increasingly shunned by George, Manolescu still recognized him as an erudite of social and political history, rivaled only by Zigu Ornea, and observed that his "liberal spirit" and his discovery of "reactionary" authors was his scholarly pedigree, already apparent in the 1970s. As Bârna writes:

The freedom of speech in the 1990s unlocked the rich, almost overwhelming manifestation of G[eorge]'s potential in socio-politico-cultural commentary. This facet, while evidently new, came as no surprise. It emerged naturally, serving as a continuation—or perhaps a fulfillment—of his identity as a literary critic, since as the writer himself noted, he had already asserted himself "as a critic of ideas (in a Gourmontian sense, we might say), concerned with controversial matters, and with issues of an ideological, political, or social nature".

Already in the early 1990s, such campaigning implied challenging the rise of illiberal currents in Romanian nationalism, which had modeled themselves on the interwar far-right. George's rejection of both fascism and communism struck others as uncompromising: in an early counter-critique, political scientist Dan Pavel argued that, while "charming", he was being irrational or excessive, since: "There are thousands of individual cases where the choice for communism was driven by an anti-fascist motivation, while the choice for fascism was driven by an anti-communist motivation." Revisiting the Iron Guard's economic theories in a dedicated series, George also concluded that these amounted to Bolshevism from the right; in a wider context, he claimed that Leninism and Nazism had been symmetrically spawned by Marxism. Beginning in late 1991, during a polemic with Ciachir (aired in Contrapunct journal), he had posthumously dressed down the nationalist doctrinaire Nae Ionescu. He argued therein that Ionescu's talk of a spiritual revolution was fraudulent, since interwar Romania had not ever been atheistic, and since the supposed elevation of conscience ended with his pupils endorsing the "haydamaks" of the Iron Guard. In 1992, he exposed the same Ionescu as a plagiarist (from Max Scheler).

George's estranged friend Arșavir Acterian now published diaries of his time under communism; in reading them, George was surprised to note that the only references to himself were as to "a writer he had never met, like I had been living in Valparaíso or Vladivostok." In the mid-1990s, he also had a feud with the novelist and polemicist Paul Goma, with whom he was often compared. He acknowledged but resented the juxtaposition, and in the process described Goma as a self-denying product of communism. Such views were in turn applauded by writer Dumitru Țepeneag, but rejected as unfair by Grigurcu. After a series of publicized breaks with the various journals he had been associated with during communism, George only published his columns in Luceafărul and the newly reestablished Adevărul Literar și Artistic. He was now fully opposed to the România Literară cell of writers, including Manolescu and Gabriel Dimisianu. The circumstances amused Manolescu: George had moved one floor up from the editorial offices, and was "throwing his poisoned darts" at writers he could actually meet daily.

== Oameni și umbre and Pro libertate ==
In 1993–2002, George's standing as a Lovinescu exegete (rated by Zamfir as the foremost surviving authority in that small realm) was also channeled into editing six volumes of "literary agendas" by the Sburătorul circle, on which he collaborated with the critic's daughter, Monica Lovinescu, as well as with Gabriela Omăt and Margareta Feraru. By 1996, he was turning his attention toward Mateiu's father, the comedic classic Ion Luca Caragiale, helping to edit the latter's polemical works as a book. The volume was poorly received by columnist George Pruteanu, who argued that its only elements of newness were more or less political attacks on other Caragiale scholars (Gafița, Mircea Iorgulescu, Ștefan Cazimir), and on Lucian Pintilie, who had adapted Caragiale's work on film. As Pruteanu observed, George appeared as "always-angry-against-all", this being "his natural state, and the one state fits him best".

Also in 1996, George was again acclaimed as a novelist, with Oameni și umbre, glasuri și tăceri ("Men and Shadows, Voices and Silences")—on which he had been writing for forty years, and which was still in an intermediary version. Almost entirely metafictional, it explored a set of authorial voices and blended various consecrated genres (romance, social novel, war novel, philosophical fiction), alternating periods (from Constanța in the Belle Époque to Weimar Germany, and to a bourgeois, interwar Bucharest)—revisited with what Bârna identifies as "an exemption from the logic of time's unidirectionality". Zamfir draws parallels with Leo Tolstoy and Marcel Proust, upholding it as an "astounding, composite, and dazzling" project. Instead, Borbély rated it as the summation of an "anti-Proustian" program that had stood at the core of George's entire work. According to Borbély, he revealed himself as a "master of the refined detail", structurally resembling Thomas Mann and Robert Musil, and still partly a Târgoviște-School narrator, with his preference for the autobiographical insertion. Reportedly, George offered Oameni și umbre as his major contribution to literature, but was surprised and annoyed to see himself read as a dilettante, a critic-turned-novelist, in the same way as Lovinescu himself. His only play, appearing in 2002, was O altă scrisoare pierdută ("Another Lost Letter")—a pastiche-like sequel to O scrisoare pierdută, by Caragiale Sr.

George's final works in the field of critical editions covered Ion Ghica (1997) and Mateiu's Sub pecetea tainei (1999). His political essays, meanwhile, arose some controversy in academia, but remained unknown to the general public. By 2000, George was look back on his work for the PNL, self-critically assessing that his impact in popularizing the liberal-capitalist agenda was "just about nil". His grievances were directed not just against post-communism socialism (seen by him as a debased Marxism, channeling the "eternal stupidity and baseness of our fellow humans"), but also against the PNL's on-and-off National Peasantist allies, whom he dismissed as farcical populists. Fellow critic Dan C. Mihăilescu defined such stances as "liberal passéism", censuring George for what he saw as excesses: his repeated attacks on nationalism, especially in its Christian form; his apparent refusal to even acknowledge local exponents of modern American liberalism; and his reductionist put-downs of contemporary authors such as Sorin Alexandrescu (mocked for supporting the National Peasantists) and Lucian Raicu (dismissed as an alcoholic).

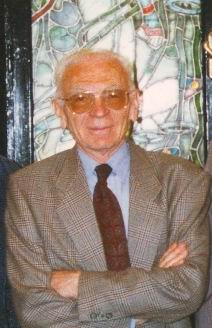
Mircea Zaciu, photographed around the time of his quarrel with George

Literary historian Mircea Zaciu, who hailed from Transylvania, was instead irked by George's scathing remarks about his fellow landsmen and their cultural expectations; his response in the polemic appeared, as part of the Alexandru George entry, in a dictionary put out by Zaciu and others. George expressed outrage at reading references to himself in Zaciu's newly published diaries (covering late communism), declaring them to be fabrications and "cheap shots" by an "odious" enemy. As Zaciu explained in 2000:

I have great sympathy and respect for [George's] work in literature and, more recently, in political science. But, at that particular moment, I was irritated by his anti-Transylvanian bias. [...] He was so deeply bothered by [my response] that he refused to shake my hand at the Book Fair a year or two ago, and subsequently launched a multi-part series in Adevărul Literar și Artistic, aimed at completely tearing me down [...].

The 1999 Albatros collection, Pro libertate ("For Liberty"), detailed George's political program in terms of direct polemics with Neo-Marxism (which George saw as more dangerous than national-communism), but also in a steady put-down of the nationalist credo. Mihăilescu appreciated the restated anti-communist vision, but deplored his radical Lovinescian stances, which had come to suggest that Romanians were naturally lazy, and that the Romanian village was fundamentally inauthentic. Also here, George justified anti-Russian sentiment as a geopolitical necessity, noting that it had emanated from actual clashes between an "almost republican" local liberalism and Tsarist autocracy. In 2003, he produced Tot pentru libertate ("Still for Liberty"), at Albatros. Done as a defensive overview of Romanian liberalism, it asserted that, from boyardom to modern-day industrialists, elites had always been on the side of reforms. Cultural journalist Tudorel Urian praised his erudition (seeing him as educated in historiography at a level higher than contemporary political scientists), but deplored his "excessive generalizations" and his contradictory statements on antisemitism (which George explicitly condemned at one point in the book, only to then quote Paul Zarifopol's belief that communism was, in part, a "Jewish conspiracy").

== Isolation and death ==
Urian observed in 2004 that the "uncomfortable and unpredictable" George was rarely invited on television shows or at symposiums, and often had to insert himself into public debates, by assuming the most confrontational stances (thus appearing to outsiders as "never satisfied", even "glum"). He, Grigurcu, and Marin Mincu were at the time censuring literary scholar Eugen Simion, who was serving as chairman of the Romanian Academy, and whom they depicted as a product of communism and a profiteer of post-communism. Simion, who had additionally opposed George's remarks about Arghezi and Preda, only provided short answers to the trio, insisting that it would have been pointless to debate people too sure of themselves. The coordination between George and Grigurcu broke down in 2001, when the former published a text entirely about George, read by the intended recipient as a passive-aggressive critique. In a formal reply, he asked that he be left alone, and invited Grigurcu to "stop writing about me at all".

The since-emigrated Gelu Ionescu recalls meeting George in 2003, and again in 2006. At the time, he had withdrawn to a one-room apartment that he had managed to purchase to his name, and which was located on Drumul Sării (outside Rahova). He had by then donated most of the books he had from Lovinescu's own collection to the Lovinescu memorial house, newly opened on Elisabeta Boulevard—where he also scheduled his own lectures. Ionescu found him to be "full of himself, his humor gone", but still loving and lovable. A final version of Oameni și umbre, glasuri și tăceri only came out in 2008, at exactly the same time as a much more condensed work of stylistic prose, called Simplex (subtitled "a novel that it still finding its definition"). At heart an autobiographical novel (with an autofictional commentary that covers its second half), Simplex had some echoes from mystery fiction; overall, it was noted by critic Mihai Iovănel for challenging the grim take on 1950s Stalinism—by describing a string of parties, and overall "a life as normal as it ever gets, under the given circumstances."

Pașii unui fantasticist ("Footsteps of a Fantasist") came out in 2009 as George's final volume. That year, he took the USR's National Literary Prize. Spiridon, who met him one final time at the ceremony, expressed disappointment that George had missed out on an opportunity to apologize, and to explain himself in humble, self-effacing terms, as he had occasionally done in his essays. Manolescu noted however that George used the moment to reconcile with Dimisianu. One of those that George still kept in contact with was Barbu Cioculescu, together with whom he intended to write a fiction book about "that fabulous year that was 1947".

The polemicist died in his native city on 28 September 2012, leaving Cioculescu to mourn him as "the last friend I still had inside the borders of this country." Writing on the same day, Zamfir remarked that George had died in "quasi-anonymity and poverty", like Leonid Dimov and Radu Petrescu before him. He also addressed George's cultural standing:

We have lost one of the greatest contemporary Romanian authors. [...] Alexandru George (withdrawn, reclusive, difficult to approach, completely lacking in media support) was precisely that, and above all, that is what he shall remain. A total writer—storyteller, critic of the highest authority, flawless editor, subtle translator: how few others could be all of these things, all at once!

Another posthumous homage came from Manolescu, who described his deceased rival as a man of ingenuity and humor, while insisting that his novels were never as good as his essays. George's fragmentary diary of the 1950s was published in 2020, revealing situations and writing processes that had went into his authorship. Writing in 2022, Spiridon credited him as the author of "brilliant essays", and also as a valuable exponent of "the bourgeois novel".
