= Lucian Raicu =

Romanian literary critic and journalist (1934–2006)

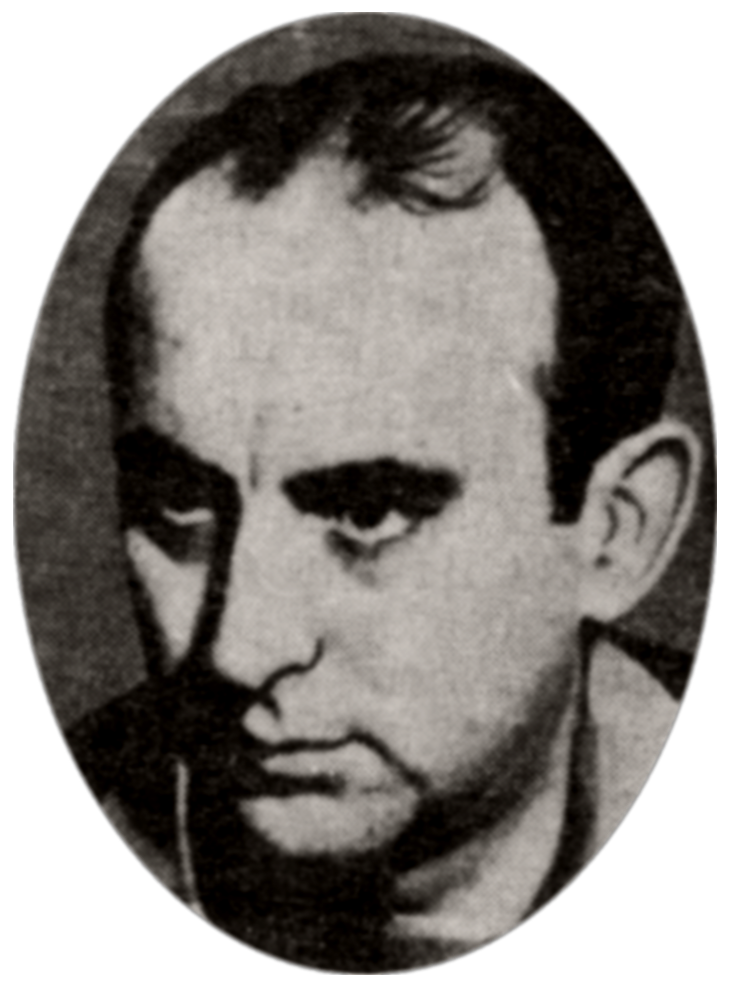
- Raicu c. 1976
- Born: Bernard Leibovici; 12 May 1934; Iași, Kingdom of Romania
- Died: 22 November 2006 (aged 72); Paris, France
- Occupations: Journalist, critic
- Writing career
- Period: 1950–c. 2000
- Genres: Essay; diary; memoir
- Movements: Marxist literary criticism; Socialist realism; Viața Romînească; Existential phenomenology; Jewish existentialism

Lucian Raicu (pen name of Bernard Leibovici; 12 May 1934 – 22 November 2006) was a Romanian literary critic, biographer, memoirist, and magazine editor, who was the brother of novelist Virgil Duda and the husband of writer Sonia Larian. As a Jewish youth growing up in Bârlad, he was drawn into leftist causes shortly after World War II, and was accepted into the Romanian Communist Party. Upon the inauguration of a communist regime in 1948, he trained at the Eminescu School of Literature in Bucharest, and, before the age of twenty, was drafted into the new cultural establishment. As a staff critic at Viața Romînească, he initially pledged himself to Socialist Realism, and supervised the literary scene for ideological conformity, falling in line with the censorship apparatus. More privately, Raicu was embracing dissident stances and questioning the standards of Marxist literary criticism; alongside friends such as Nicolae Labiș and Paul Goma, he began reading banned works by Romanian and French authors. His professionalization was effected in 1958, upon his graduation from the University of Bucharest.

Encouraged by the promise of de-Stalinization in the late 1950s, Raicu was openly challenging the communist literary establishment with articles which spoke about the primacy of aesthetic over political values. Alongside Goma, Labiș and Larian, he participated in the 1956 youth protest movement, though Securitate agents never managed to implicate him directly, and had to rely on suspicions. He and his wife were still caught up in the backlash, and left unemployed after Raicu refused to perform self-criticism. They were partly rehabilitated in the 1960s, but were by then on their way to becoming fully anti-communist. As a columnist at România Literară, Raicu embraced a "phenomenological" overview which cultivated pluralism, close reading, and a full-on rejection of formalism. He was widely celebrated in the literary community, especially after publishing highly original monographs on Liviu Rebreanu (1967), Nikolai Gogol (1974) and Labiș (1977), being seen as a companion of younger liberal critics—such as Mircea Iorgulescu, Nicolae Manolescu, and Eugen Simion. Raicu also came into implicit, and then explicit, conflict with the official strictures imposed by national-communism, rejecting its "July Theses". He was a first-hand witness to the death of his novelist friend, Marin Preda; this mysterious incident, alongside other poorly-explained deaths in his personal circle, and a general disgust with the national-communist regime, eventually forced him into near-complete isolation and silence.

After a series of efforts, the Raicus were finally reissued Romanian passports in late 1986, allowing them to receive a scholarship in Paris; they never returned from their trip. Lucian Raicu tried to rebuild his career as a critic in France, but was largely ignored by its literary establishment—excepting an encouraging review by Michel Crépu. Focusing his attention on Eugène Ionesco, who became the main topic of his literary diary, he was also a participant in the anti-communist movement of exiles, alongside Goma and Dorin Tudoran. He welcomed the Romanian Revolution in December 1989, but was again jaded after the political violence of June 1990, which cemented his resolve about not returning to his homeland. Making selective broadcasts over Radio France Internationale, and penning a number of memoirs, he spent his final decade incapacitated by disease, and became fully isolated in his Parisian home. He ultimately died anonymously in a French hospital, being survived by his widow and his brother (the latter of whom had settled in Israel).

== Early life ==
The future Lucian Raicu was officially registered as Bernard Leibovici. His parents were entrepreneur Carol Leibovici and his wife Uca (née Solomon), who worked as a clerk. Bernard was born in his grandparents' home at Iași, on 12 May 1934; as he explained in a 1975 interview, Uca only traveled there for her labor, returning with him to her preferred home in Bârlad after just three weeks. His ancestry was entirely Jewish—he once declared himself as "above all else, a Jew", noting that this ethnic origin gave him an "existential drama" and a "transfiguring mystique" with Talmudic roots; his brother, the novelist Duda (born Rubin Leibovici), was similarly attached to the Jewish identity, as discussed by his book of essays on Mihail Sebastian. The two boys grew up on Strada Strâmbă area of Bârlad, with their parents owning a house on the adjacent Stroe Belloescu Street. Their Jewish day school colleagues included several noted intellectuals: journalist I. Schechter (or "Igor Șerbu"), engineer Sergiu Brandea, and playwright Dumitru Solomon. According his own recollections of childhood, Bernard was fascinated by Mark Twain's Prince and Pauper. Its themes of "substitution" and hints about the transformations of one's image became major themes in his work as a critic.

Comparatist and novelist Matei Călinescu recalls that "Bernard [...] was my first Jewish friend and the first one to have made me aware of how difficult it is to have been a Romanian Jew [...]. Bernard did not view his being a Romanian—or his being Jewish—as a miracle, just as I am sure that he did not regard being Romanian—or Jewish—as some metaphysical curse". According to Călinescu, this attitude showed a rift that existed between Raicu's take on his own identity and the struggles of his contemporary, the Christianized Jew Nicolae Steinhardt. Raicu also viewed himself as quintessentially tied to Western Moldavia and its traditional spirit, which he describes as "above all a critical spirit [Raicu's emphasis]." The family managed to live through World War II and its waves of antisemitic persecution. As reported by Duda, Carol Leibovici was made to do forced labor in the quarries, and was so exhausted that he died soon after the war; Rubin and Bernard's maternal uncle barely managed to survive the Iași pogrom and its "death train".

Young Raicu integrated with the local version of the Jewish left, increasingly associated with the Communist Party after 1944. As noted by literary historian Leon Volovici, both he and his future wife, Sonia Larian, belonged to a generation of young Jews who were won over by "communist romanticism" around 1948 (when the Romanian Kingdom was toppled by a communist regime), only to "wake up" from its lure around 1960. In tandem, Raicu was also an aspiring author: he and Solomon attended a literary society in Bârlad, which was named after Alexandru Vlahuță; according to Brandea, Raicu also won first prize at a national competition in literature, for which he traveled to Bucharest. His literary debut can be traced to 1950, when he attended in Iași a meeting of young Moldavian writers, also attended by poet Nicolae Labiș, who greatly impressed him. Later, the two of them were also competitors in the "all-republic contest in Romanian language and literature", which Labiș won by submitting a paper on Romanian folklore that actually included his own improvised verse, made to sound folksy. During their several trips to Iași, they befriended the more senior poet and critic George Mărgărit. As Raicu noted later, it was Mărgărit who introduced them to "cultural values", which were "hastily neglected" by the communist establishment (through this channel, Labiș got to know the works of Arthur Rimbaud). The two boys also traveled together into Labiș's pastoral homeland in Suceava Region, with mention of this being made in one of Labiș's poems:

Prietene, nu vrei din nou, noi doi
Suind pe firul apei, zbuciumate
Pînă acolo unde-n lung șuvoi
Vîltoarea urlătoarelor se zbate
Să ne suim pe creste cu brădet
Sub horbota zăpezii sclipitoare
Iar glasul amintirilor, încet
Să ne-nvălească-n falduri de ninsoare!

Translation:

O friend let's you and I return
Up over rivers white of overflowing
Down to the place where ripples swirl and turn
Into a massive coil that's always growing
All high above the ridges and their firs
And into snows of bright, glistening lace,
Where in the soft voice that our recollection stirs
Fold upon fold of ice might lose our trace!

Having graduated from Bârlad's Gheorghe Roșca Codreanu High School (where he was colleagues with Solomon and with other future writers, including Ion Hobana), Raicu enlisted at the University of Bucharest Faculty of Philology in 1951. He only spent a year there, transferring to the newly formed Eminescu School of Literature, which served the Writers' Union of Romania (USR). The institution is seen by his future friend Nicolae Breban as a "rather grotesque and amateurish cultural and Soviet nursery"; also according to Breban, during his time there he became especially close to Labiș, forming the "greatest friendship of [Raicu's] entire life". Raicu wrote for the Union of Communist Youth paper, Scînteia Tineretului, where he and Labiș were permanent literary columnists. During this stint there, his circle of friends expanded to include Radu Cosașu, Teodor Mazilu, Eugen Mandric, and Florin Mugur. He and Duda brought Mazilu into their home on Uranus Hill, where they were bunking with Labiș, Mărgărit and Ion Gheorghe. Raicu became a literary columnist at Viața Romînească in 1952, before his graduation from the School of Literature (which came in 1954); he was also editor at Gazeta Literară.

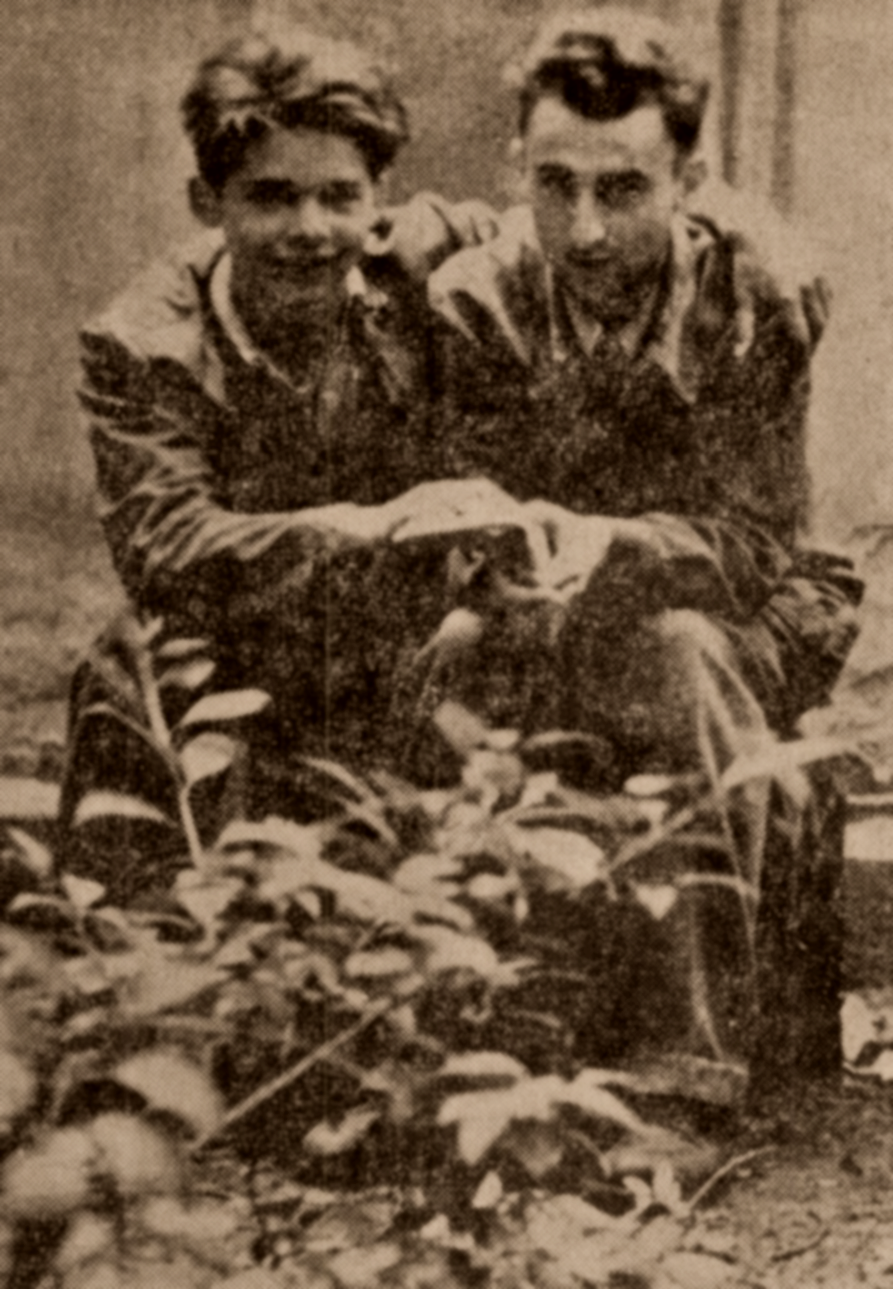
Raicu and Nicolae Labiș as students of the Eminescu School of Literature

At that stage, Raicu was giving his full support to the official line of Socialist Realism. As later reviewed by literary historian Ana Selejan, he argued from within Marxist literary criticism, identifying and condemning "bourgeois remnants" in the works of his generation colleagues. He thus censured Ion Brad for communist poetry that still seemed "idyllic", and attacked popular magazines for featuring "mediocre" poems by the likes of Gica Iuteș. Raicu was instead enthusiastic about the poetic debut of the still teen-aged Mugur, describing him as a model to follow (though still occasionally chiding him for not writing fables about work-shy peasants). In mid-1955, he took the side of "scientific" literary criticism, which relied on objectivity as an obligation. From this position, he debated with his colleague Vera Călin, whose version of Marxism was more programmatically subjectivist.

A subjective "positivity" eventually won over in Raicu's own columns, which offered encouragements to generation upon generation of Romanian writers. According to the younger critic Ioana Pârvulescu, it should not be mistaken for naivete, but rather for "[giving] everyone a chance"—Raicu "does not admire all those whom he reads", but gave each one of them his full attention. A younger colleague, Daniel Cristea-Enache, remarked that Raicu was unusually charitable in this respect, sometimes to the point of close reading even through the more "irrelevant books". Later, in discussing the work of Leo Tolstoy (whom he had read profusely while recovering from an accident), Raicu took a stance against critical revisionism. His "empathetic vision", Cristea-Enache notes, risked identifying Tolstoy's entire life and work with his "peak", entirely glossing over the more questionable aspects. Scholar Alexandra Ciocârlie similarly notes that Raicu's "participatory criticism" combines a "complete, near-religious, faith" and a "tremulous voice", sometimes to the point of annoying readers.

== Repression and return ==
As an official critic within the communist establishment, Raicu was focused on studies about the Romanian "social novel", defending and expanding on observations made by an interwar literary theorist, Garabet Ibrăileanu. In 1956, he published an overview on "value judgment". Regarded by scholar Alex Goldiș as one of "the most daring texts to have come out in the late '50s" (and immediately lambasted at the USR's annual congress), it exposed the mediocrity of several official writers, including Aurel Baranga, Mihai Beniuc, Dan Deșliu, and Eugen Frunză. He was also drawing attention to himself by engaging in publicized disagreements with colleagues such as Henri Zalis. These were dismissively covered by Scînteia of 14 April 1957, as "'disputes' on the periphery of literary life have [that] no principled goals whatsoever, only personal quarrels and mutual compromises". A year later, the same newspaper reported on another dispute, between Raicu and Nicolae Popescu-Doreanu, noting that the former had seemingly questioned the moral superiority of Marxism-Leninism. Such heresies did not impress the anti-communist exile, where essayist Virgil Ierunca once listed young Raicu as one of the "pseudo-writers [and] professional opportunists". Ciocârlie contrarily believes that Raicu "emerged unaltered" from the Socialist-Realist epoch, preserving his true self when others did not. He was also defended by Călinescu, who writes that his friend's "genuine idealism" was already set on a collision course with the communists' "hypocritical, contradictory humanism". In a 2006 obituary, scholar Paul Cernat concludes that Raicu, a "mobile spirit", was mostly influenced by "European humanism" and direct readings from interwar literature (though, as Breban cautions, he was never an erudite).

Raicu eventually completed his classical training by returning to the Faculty of Philology, whence he graduated in 1958. According to his own testimony, he and other young intellectuals, including Labiș, Paul Goma and Lucian Pintilie, were meeting semi-clandestinely at a house on Odobescu Street No 2. Driven by the "nonchalance of youth", they had begun reading, individually and to each other, literature that had been explicitly banned by the communist censors, and which they had procured from the antiquarian Stelescu. They went through Camil Petrescu's biographical play on Danton, which had a conservative message, but also through scholarly works by Lucian Blaga, Benjamin Fondane, Eugen Lovinescu, François Mauriac, and Albert Thibaudet. Raicu also frequented the more senior critic Savin Bratu, who let him and Labiș, who let him borrow "good books", including some that had been removed from public libraries. Later in life, he privately confided that he knew Bratu to be a "terrifying politruk", but also noted that "mysterious inner-workings and contradictions" could turn anyone, including Bratu, into a liberal.

In ideological terms, by 1956 Raicu and Cosașu had come to side with the anti-Stalinist left, secretly supporting the revolution in neighboring Hungary. They formed part of a larger group sympathetic to the youth opposition network that also included Larian, Labiș, Mugur, Gheorghe, and Fănuș Neagu. According to author Irimie Străuț, these people listened in as student leaders Goma and Alexandra Indrieș voiced their support for the restoration of Greater Romania; this resulted in them being investigated and punished by the communist regime's secret police, called Securitate. Străuț subscribes to the notion that Raicu and Larian's subsequent marginalization, as well as Labiș's fatal wounding by a Bucharest tram (which he describes as a political murder), were sparked by the 1956 incident. Cosașu provides a similar account, noting that Labiș was an instigator of the more daring political meetings. The Securitate captured and interrogated another participant, Aurel Covaci, but he never mentioned these meetings, thus sparing others from being themselves arrested. Labiș was instead "banned and relentlessly pursued", up to his mysterious injury; while dying in hospital, he reportedly spoke of his designs for a meritocratic government, with Raicu as the Minister of Culture.

In 1990, Raicu himself spoke of his and Larian as having supported a "spontaneous movement", which was centered on their shared beliefs about individual freedoms. He added: "I myself wrote some articles, and participated in some more or less illegal gatherings, which posed this as a question: what is to be done? What can we do, in this framework, so as to be, and to endure as, writers?" After the roundup, he and other young authors were exposed to near-constant persecution, and submitted to denunciation meetings, or "trials" (one of which had industrial laborers for accusers). In August 1958, after having continuously refused to engage in self-criticism for his perceived liberal socialism, he was ousted from the Communist Party, and, by his own account, became a nonperson. Literary historian Eugen Negrici proposes that Raicu, alongside other authors—from Ovid S. Crohmălniceanu to Ion Negoițescu—, had been callous in assessing the impact of de-Stalinization in Romania, and had found himself exposed to the inevitable backlash. Living for a while on the margins of society, Raicu still celebrated the victories of international socialism, including the Cuban Revolution and the Lumumbist initiatives, as well as any signs of continued liberalization in Romania itself.

In a 1981 piece, Crohmălniceanu, who could still do editorial work at Viața Românescă, revealed that he had personally rebelled against Raicu's "dastardly ouster", allowing him to publish reviews and articles under various pseudonyms, and as such paying back "a portion of his measly salary". In his public stances, Crohmălniceanu disavowed Raicu, denouncing him as a "revisionist" and an enemy of Socialist Realism. Demoralized by his "quasi-interdiction", and also shocked by Labiș's demise, Raicu found a new creative home in a circle of writers gravitating around Nichita Stănescu. This informal club was also joined by Călinescu, Cosașu, Breban, Mazilu and Mugur, as well by Cezar Baltag, Grigore Hagiu, Modest Morariu, Petre Stoica, and cartoonist Eugen Mihăescu. Duda, who also joined his brother and Breban on their peregrinations through Bucharest, had trained as legal adviser, and only debuted in literature in 1964. He once declared that Raicu and Larian were not just his relatives, but also his best friends.

In a 1960 essay, Horia Bratu gave positive coverage to Raicu's earlier texts on the "social novel", though he still chided him for his "sententious air." Raicu and Larian had been accepted back into the literary profession by 1963, when they were collecting their salaries from the USR and could rent a "tiny apartment on Între Gîrle Street" (south of Piața Unirii). By 1967, Lucian had been reassigned to Gazeta Literară. The editorial team, nominally was headed by Tiberiu Utan, also included Baltag, Valeriu Cristea, Sami Damian, Eugen Simion, and Gabriel Dimisianu. As recalled by the latter, communist hardliners put increasing pressure on the magazine, making all of them miserable; "instead of fighting [for us], Utan took his refuge in alcohol." Especially close to Călinescu during those years, the critic confided his exact sentiments about the regime they were living under: he centered his ethics on a notion of "personal dignity", and tolerant of some forms of collaboration with the authorities. He drew the line at collaboration with Securitate agents, believing that anyone who agreed to become an informant was morally salvageable. Later in his Romanian career, he was mainly employed as an editor at România Literară magazine, itself issued by the USR, having been introduced there by the inaugural editor in chief—his friend Breban. He was also România Literară's columnist—as noted by Ciocârlie, he and his colleague Gheorghe Grigurcu were "among the most subtle poetry analysts in that era". Press historian Nae Antonescu also remarked in early 1968 that the two of them, alongside Nicolae Manolescu, "write beautifully", in articles that "cultivate metaphors, the musical suggestions of phrases [and] the polemical, sometimes rebellious, gesture".

== Phenomenology and national-communism ==
Upon fully discarding the ideological constraints of Marxist-Leninism, Raicu was seen by Volovici as a "critic of great spiritual complexity and depth, fascinated by the mysteries of creativity"; Pârvulescu reserves praise for Raicu's method of viewing the literary process "from within", as an "initiation" of his readers. The latter quality was noted by two writers debuting in the 1960s, Emil Brumaru and Mircea Dinescu. Both were enthralled by Raicu's preface to Fyodor Dostoevsky's classic, The Idiot, put out by Biblioteca pentru toți in 1965—as Brumaru recalls, it gave them the key to understanding the novel, which had previously seemed unapproachable. Raicu's first published volume was a monograph on Liviu Rebreanu, appearing at Editura pentru literatură in 1967 and earning him the annual USR prize. Among the critics of the day, Mihai Ungheanu commended Raicu for having not just reestablished Rebreanu as a relevant subject of scrutiny, but also of having discovered and presented the "unifying aesthetic vision" of Rebreanu's prose (as well as, psychologically, his "cult of seriousness", of labor, which contradicted the commonplace, "barbaric", perception of Rebreanu as an "instinctual writer"). Ungheanu remarked however that Raicu often had "too much tact" in his approach; the book's "unfolding deficiencies, which are not at all negligible", still did not deter from its "obvious superiority" to everything that had been written before. Re-reviewing the monograph decades later, fellow critic Dimisianu commended Raicu for having managed to usurp the "cliches of Socialist Realism" by exploring the deep-layered symbolism in Rebreanu's novels.

According to Breban, the Rebreanu monograph is a work "unique in our literature", which already displays Raicu's contempt for officialdom. Among Raicu's generation colleagues, Manolescu spoke of his practicing a "democracy of literature" and "cult of nuances", reminiscent of Tudor Vianu's earlier essays. The anti-institutional discourse is seen by Ciocârlie as permeating Raicu's entire output: "Interested in penetrating the intimacy of a text, he despises the surfeit and self-sufficiency of those colleagues whose commentary only serves to confirm commonplace ideas—hence his hostility toward pedantry, which he attributes to all authors that are guided by theories." His rejection of formalism and objectivity also led Raicu to part with the emerging tradition, or "new criticism". The same is asserted by Cernat, who places Raicu within an anti-dogmatic, biography-centered tradition that rejected post-structuralist theorizing by the likes of Michel Foucault and Roland Barthes; to the modernists and the postmodernists, he seemed "antiquated". Cernat sees Raicu as philosophically akin to Fondane, Lev Shestov, and Georges Poulet. Goldiș contrarily proposes that there was at least one "strange synchronicity" tying Raicu (but also Călinescu, Manolescu and Simion) to Barthes (and then also to Jean Rousset or Serge Doubrovsky), since they were equally interested in challenging the "critical canon" of their respective literary culture.

As one of the scholars who reviewed Raicu's work, Al. Cistelecan reports: "No other Romanian critic, old or new, has had as lofty, as sacramental, as 'fundamentalist' a conception of literature [...]; none has professed the mystique of an oeuvre that would be more generous and more radical". According to Cistelecan, Raicu ultimately found in applied existential phenomenology (and in "subdued Platonism") an instrument for separating "authentic" literature out of the larger field of art for art's sake. Specifically, he argued that "true" writings contain a revelation, or at least the promise of a revelation. Raicu expanded on such principles with the essays called Structuri literare ("Literary Structures"), put out by Editura Eminescu in 1973, then with a literary biography of Nikolai Gogol, appearing at Cartea Românească in 1974. As noted by Pârvulescu, the latter work shows him as a "detective", opposing his "daring presuppositions" to the critical consensus (regarded by Raicu himself as utterly stale). Breban praises the volume as one of "acute originality", while Cernat calls it "splendid". In similar vein, Ciocârlie sees it as Raicu's most accomplished—since it was no longer tributary to the "religion of literature", and as such could reflect on the more miserable and mediocre aspects of Gogol's career.

The 1960s and '70s, which saw Nicolae Ceaușescu's rise to a supreme position in the Communist Party, also introduced the ideology of national-communism. Raicu was initially impressed by this transition: in late August 1968, after the Soviet-led invasion of Czechoslovakia and Ceaușescu's public opposition to it, he was one of the 23 writers who signed a letter in support of him, titled "For the defense of socialism's core values". In later years, while remaining congratulatory of writers who embraced Romanian nationalism, Ceaușescu also reintroduced totalitarian pressures, to the point of blending into Neo-Stalinism, with the "July Theses" of 1971. Raicu's subsequent relationship with the Ceaușescuist establishment is the issue of some contention. Breban, who embraced an openly anti-Ceaușescu position, had to be replaced at România Literară. For a few months in 1971, its publication was handled by his former subordinates, including Raicu. Breban himself recalls that Raicu no longer spoke to him after that moment. In a 1991 article, critic Alexandru George, who had been repressed under the earlier stages of communism, assessed that Raicu, alongside Manolescu and Simion, had "barely nuanced" the communist "scale of values", and therefore could only find themselves rejected by more rigorous anti-communists (such as George himself). In contrast, Adrian Popescu, who was editor at Steaua magazine in the 1970s, argues that Raicu, alongside Nicolae Balotă, Mircea Iorgulescu and Cornel Regman, was part of the most pro-Western branch of Romanian literary criticism, whose very activities challenged Ceaușescu's "anti-cultural policies [and his] dirigisme in matters of Romanian literature". According to Popescu, it was these figures, alongside an assortment of poets and prose writers, who helped fashion the USR into a "bastion of free expression".

The reintroduction of political censorship had still found Raicu to be a difficult case. In 1972, he sent in an article on the prose of a dissident figure, Dumitru Țepeneag. It was reportedly approved for print by România Literară's new head editor, George Ivașcu, but then eliminated by censors as "not sufficiently Marxist." Goma, who had been rearrested for igniting a protest movement in 1977, listed Breban and Raicu as two of the friends he could still count on after that date. Raicu and Cristea openly challenged the censorship apparatus in 1978, when they both published praise of Goma's Camera de alături. Their respective chronicles appeared just as Goma's novel was being withdrawn from the shops by Securitate agents. While allowed to enjoy success as a literary figure, Raicu was still not readmitted into the Party. In early 1974, the authorities had granted him and his wife a new home in northern Bucharest, right outside the Metropolitan Circus, but, by June of the same year, also included the two of them, as well as their colleague Cristea, on a list of non-Party-affiliate literary professionals; these would only receive half pay for their services. They continued to be harassed by the authorities, who ideally wanted all editorial offices to be purged of non-members. Iorgulescu argues that Ivașcu was agreeing with this principle, and was pressuring dissenters into leaving. For at least four years before, and throughout the remainder of his Romanian career, Raicu had had his phone bugged by the Securitate, which kept records of his conversations. He was reunited with Neagu, who spoke admiringly of him in his 1977 Cartea cu prieteni. According to this text, Raicu had been granted a Romanian passport, and used it to travel in Central Europe, alongside Neagu himself. As a practical joke, the two writers exchanged documents, and technically returned back home with "false names".

From 1975, Ivașu, who had become upset by the censors' mounting intrusion on his editorial work, agreed to relent his own pressures on Raicu. Instead, he became an unofficial protector of the critic, also extending his favors to Dimisianu, Iorgulescu and other staff liberals. In 1976, Cartea Românească had featured another collection of Raicu's essays, as Critica, formă de viață ("Criticism as a Lifestyle"). He returned as a biographer with a monograph on Labiș. Published by Editura Eminescu in 1977, it is regarded by scholar Constantin Coroiu as the best-ever profile of the deceased poet. Writer George Arion similarly noted that the monograph was "admirable", "honest and thorough", mapping Labiș's "grave anxieties" (as well as Raicu's own "internal turmoil"). C. Stănescu of Scînteia observed that Raicu had taken an "existentialist" angle, using Labiș like Jean-Paul Sartre had used Baudelaire. He believed that the "beautiful book" was also somewhat excessive, since Raicu had made his friend appear as "exclusively 'the symbol' of the correct attitude to have". According to Arion, beyond its "apparent disorder", Raicu's text adhered to a "preordained plan", presenting to the reader as a "good novel". Simion welcomed it as a "true work of critical creation", endorsing its central thesis about Labiș's quick maturing into a poet "of liberty" and "of the inner depths". He observed that Raicu had been dominated by his "subdued spiritual love". This sometimes gave way to an excessive sentimentality, and made Raicu over-analyze the referenced poems.

== Recluse and exile ==
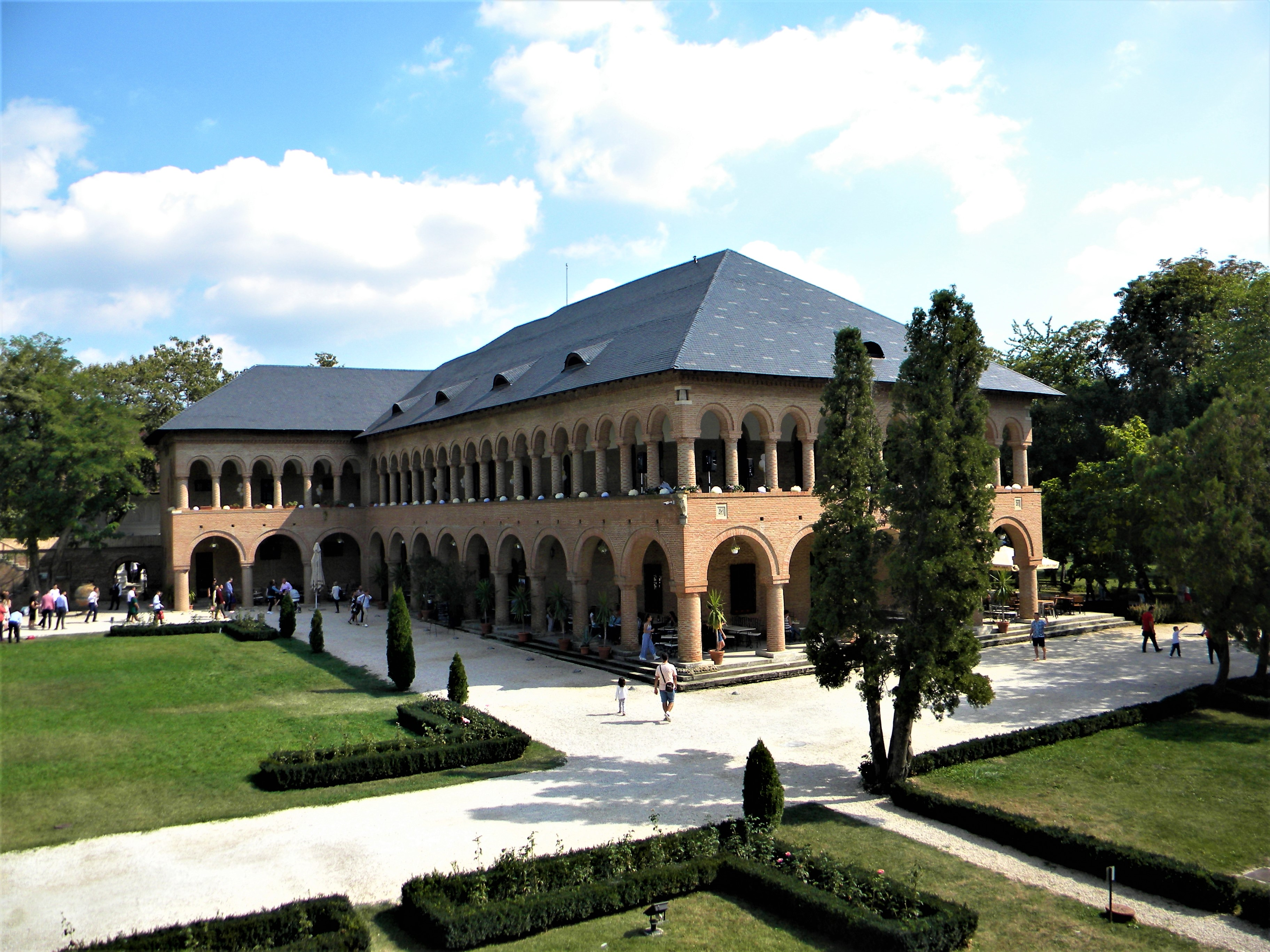
The writers' restaurant in Mogoșoaia, scene of Marin Preda's death

Raicu and his wife were good friends with Cartea Românească's manager, novelist Marin Preda; poet Ileana Mălăncioiu, who witnessed their gatherings, reports that Preda was impressed by the couple's solidarity, referring to them as the "Raicu Siblings". According to a Securitate report, both Leibovicis attended an alcohol party held at Mogoșoaia on 15 May 1980, during which Preda fell into a drunken stupor and died. More detailed accounts were later collected by Preda's nephew, suggesting that Preda had spontaneously joined the couple and their young friend Dinescu, who were reportedly celebrating a name day. He was recovering from a mysterious head injury, received before arriving in Mogoșoaia, and was also overcome with depression. Preda had stumbled just as he was picking up his first drink of the night, and had to be carried to his room, where he died unsupervised, inviting speculation that he had been murdered (either by the Securitate or by his enemies in the literary world). One of the witnesses was Cartea Românească's Corneliu Popescu, who recounts that the group was in fact celebrating Larian's birthday, and that the novelist, who was manifestly tired, only decided to drop by because of his "deep respect for the Raicus." Popescu hints at "circumstances that, in my opinion, hastened [Preda's] death." Though he does not detail what these were, he mentions that one of the attendees pranked Preda with a glass of vodka—Preda drank it in one sip, under the impression that it was carbonated water, then had to be carried out.

According to another of his associates, the linguist Vasile Popovici, it was Preda's death, as the loss of "a great friend", that caused Raicu to "withdraw from the writers' community". His isolation was only enhanced during the subsequent years, during the application of sweeping austerity policies: "in a Bucharest disfigured by the agony of communism, Lucian Raicu rarely even went out, terrified as he was by the aggression of thousands of faces, of frost, of shortages, of each day's ennui." Iorgulescu recalls him as "somber, self-contained, looking older by several decades, but most of all bored, bored to the point of disgust". This made him the only one at România Literară to have understood the irrelevancy of their cultural resistance. Iorgulescu additionally proposes that Raicu's superior understanding also had to do with his place of work turning into a "place of dying", with a quick succession of "bizarre deaths" and suicides. In 1981, a Securitate document drafted by Lieutenant Colonel Ilie Merce informed that Raicu and Simion were among the writers who had openly condemned their colleague Ion Caraion for defecting to the West.

Six other collections of Raicu's essays came out at Cartea Românească, before and after Preda's death: Practica scrisului și experiența lecturii ("Practicing Writing and Experiencing Reading", 1978), Reflecții asupra spiritului creator ("Reflections on the Creative Self", 1979), Printre contemporani ("Among Contemporaries", 1980), Calea de acces ("A Way In", 1982), Fragmente de timp ("Fragments in Time", 1984), Scene din romanul literaturii ("Scenes from Literature as a Novel", 1985). As noted in 2007 by Cristea-Enache, these works, of which Calea de acces was Raicu's "most beautiful", consolidated his appeal among a Romanian readership, with its "amazingly high interest [in] authentic literature." Partly centered on exploring the deeper structures of George Bacovia's poems, they also evidence Raicu's belief in poetry as the more superior form of writing, for "teaching one how to live". They too were upheld as proofs of Raicu's genius: reviewer Dan Cristea described Reflecții asupra spiritului creator as having managed to uncover the "corporeality" of literature, giving the impression that Raicu "perceives and produces ideas-sensations"; Popovici discovered it as a "shock for which nothing had prepared me". Printre contemporani, which was awarded the Romanian Academy's Bogdan Petriceicu Hasdeu Prize, was described by reviewer Cornel Ungureanu as Raicu's method of outlining his spiritual associations with other literary figures, including the subjects of his essays and those whom he (sparingly) cited. Raicu's studies, which included the first-ever coverage of actor Toma Caragiu's brief career in poetry, doubled as revelations about Raicu's own creative ego.

For a while in the 1970s and '80s, Raicu was a "central figure" in local literary life, though he remained largely uninterested in cultivating his own celebrity status. During the same interval, Larian had completed her own transition, from children's writing into fantasy. Though she was allowed to publish her novels, they were largely ignored by reviewers, since they tackled near-prohibited themes (such as the lives of middle-class Jews, or depictions of cannibalism), and also because they feared overpraising "Raicu's wife". The Leibovicis were by then trying to persuade the regime to grant them renewed passports, the possession of which would have allowed them to visit Western countries. Călinescu reports that they met "enormous and humiliating" obstacles on their quest. In November 1986, after being granted a scholarship to study in France, they were finally given their papers by the Ceaușescu regime. As Raicu later told Duda, they "simply could not return" to Romania. The critic was forced by such circumstances to leave his manuscripts behind, but the authorities remained careless in handling these; as a result, Dinescu was able to recover them from Raicu's discarded home in the winter of 1986–1987, and could even smuggle some of them out of Romania.

As Cristea-Enache writes, Raicu's departure effectively destroyed his cultural capital in Romania, and never allowed him to grow as a writer in his adoptive France (where he only endured as a "misfit"). A similar point is made by Raicu's disciple, Simona Sora, who notes that he began suffering from a "non-analyzed depression", which also made him turn his attention to absurdist works by a fellow exile, Eugène Ionesco. While Raicu and Larian settled in Paris (occupying another "tiny apartment on Rue Bargue"), Duda took longer to leave Romania, and was only pushed to do so by antisemitic attacks in the national-communist paper, Săptămîna (which also gave him reason to identify more and more as a Jew, rather than as a Romanian). He ultimately settled in Israel in 1988, alongside other Romanian refuseniks. Raicu's own French period, meanwhile, witnessed the publication of his 1974 book of commentary as Avec Gogol ("With Gogol"), in a translation curated by Éditions L'Âge d'Homme in 1992. As Ciocârlie reports, the "admirable essay never gained attention within the French school of criticism." The indifference was also documented by critic Michel Crépu, who discovered that he was the only one to have published a review of the work (which he called "formidable").

== Final years ==
Iorgulescu, who defected in mid-1989 and rejoined Raicu in Paris, found him changed for the better: "His irony returning to him, his verve rekindled, his wisdom invigorating and luminous; an 'old man Raicu', born again." He now reconnected with other writers who had left Romania, and rallied with the anti-communist networks abroad—including one formed around Goma, who visited him in Paris, and Dorin Tudoran, who, in 1987, co-opted him on the editorial board of his Munich-based journal, Agora; he was also briefly employed as a correspondent by Radio Free Europe, meeting with his more senior Romanian colleagues, that included his former adversary Ierunca. In Ierunca and Monica Lovinescu's home, he met and conversed with the American-exiled philosopher, Mircea Eliade, to whom he described the Romanian literary underground of the 1950s. Goma and Tudoran eventually split with each other over personal disputes, during which Goma claimed that his adversary had always maligned Raicu as "a coward". Tudoran denied that this was true.

In December 1989, the Romanian Revolution managed to end communism—by Raicu's own account, he and Larian watched the televised violence with a "formidable emotion". He soon returned to publishing in Romania as well, mainly with articles carried by Vatra and România Literară. He became critical of the post-communist National Salvation Front, especially after its government facilitated the June 1990 Mineriad as a means to violently silence dissent. In July, he was interviewed in Paris by Gabriela Adameșteanu of Revista 22, expressing his disgust with Romania's political life, but also noting that the lifting of censorship, and the overall effervescence, also created the conditions for "excellent essays" (he declared himself especially impressed by those of Andrei Pippidi). Raicu asked of his Romanian peers that they recover and publish all of Goma's novels, noting that Goma deserved to be recognized as a "great writer of prose". He himself remained silent on other topics, generating controversy. In an August 1991 piece, journalist Petre Anghel invited Raicu, "who now lives abroad in the foreign darkness", "outside of any danger", to give his full account of Preda's death—which Anghel himself viewed as a murder. The poet Cezar Ivănescu went further in 1996, when he accused Raicu and Larian, alongside other "drunkards" present at Mogoșoaia, of having left Preda to die.

In 1993, Raicu's literary diary on Ionesco appeared at Editura Litera International (fragments were translated and published by the Revue des Deux Mondes in March 2007); from 1987, he had been preparing a monograph on Ionesco's "vital circuit", with the diary as his rough draft. Ovid S. Crohmălniceanu read it as a document of Raicu's own "mistrusting tiredness", as evidenced by Raicu's reliance on oblique expressions, by his refusal to clearly indicate citations from Ionescu's writings, and by his stated belief that not all of Ionescu's works were worthy of attention. In 1994, Raicu published some of his memoirs at Cartea Românească, as Scene, reflecții, fragmente ("Scenes, Reflections, Fragments"). He opted never to return to Romania, despite being visited in Paris by his old friend Simion, who tried to persuade him otherwise. This decision reportedly hinted at a certain malaise—Sora contends that Raicu was aware of his having "broken up" with the Romanian society, and also that he could not bear to live out a disillusionment with the post-revolutionary regime. The period witnessed a reassessment of his early work from radical positions—the critical positions expressed by Ierunca and George found a more polemical expressions in an overview of communist literature, put out in 2001 by Marian Popa. Popa regarded Raicu as a former exponent of the "Jewish supremacy" over Romanian letters, and also as one of the "Jews who set the tone for nonconformism" (such statements were quoted by another critic, Dan C. Mihăilescu, as samples of Popa's "unverifiable and irresponsible" claims).

Raicu's final regular contributions were letters to his Romanian public. Read by him over Radio France Internationale, they mainly touched on the newer developments in Western European literature, but also included unexpected, comedic memoirs of his encounters with other writers (such as an episode in which Mazilu, though terminally ill, preoccupies himself with obtaining a "proper hat"). As Cernat reveals, all of these essays had been written in the 1990s, since the author was by then bedridden, "exhausted with disease", and "nearly blind". As Popovici recounts, he and Larian also eventually stopped answering their phone. Old friends who managed to contact Raicu include Mălăncioiu, who reports that he was dependent on his wife, despondent, but also that he "had not changed his views on life." Manolescu, who served for a while as Romania's UNESCO ambassador, also tried to contact Raicu and Larian, but was told that they were not receiving visits. He later surmised that this was due to their having descended into poverty. Receiving a USR special prize in 2003, Raicu lived to see a reissue of his Calea de acces at Polirom publishers (2004), which was supposed to revive interest in his work. Also that year, Emil Brumaru collected the epistles he had sent to Raicu in the 1970s, when they shared employment at România Literară. The edition had humorous undertones, as Raicu had never answered any of the letters. Mălăncioiu believes that the critic had consciously avoided Brumaru: while he enjoyed the letters' intertexuality, rich in allusions to Russian literature, he must have disliked Brumaru's "literary-sexual and sexual-literary obsessions".

Raicu ultimately died on 22 November 2006 at a hospital in Paris. According to Popovici, only his wife was present, of all those who knew him, and the medical staff never even found out who their patient was. His body was then taken for cremation at Père Lachaise Cemetery. The small ceremony, reportedly financed by Manolescu from a Romanian state fund, was attended by Crépu (who went there despite having never met Raicu, and covered the event with a note in Revue des Deux Mondes); also present were Dinescu and his wife, artist Florica Cordescu, as well as essayist Magda Cârneci. In his obituary piece, Popovici declared his astonishment that Raicu had been forgotten not just by the "lovers of literature", but also by "the younger writers, those who now make literature into their own reason for existing". He called on his peers to recover "this writer of genius", and turn his death into a "new debut". Carmen Mușat handled and prefaced a posthumous anthology of his essays, which appeared in 2009 at Editura Hasefer of Bucharest. The "letters from Paris" were collected in two editions. The first, overseen by Livius Ciocârlie for Cartea Românească, appeared in 2010. A larger selection was done by Sora on behalf of the Romanian Cultural Institute, in 2016. In 2015, Larian was writing a novel dedicated to her late husband. She herself died shortly after, on 23 January 2016, which was one year and one month ahead of Duda.
