= Onirism =

Literary trend

Onirism was a surrealist Romanian literary school most popular during the 1960s, in the wake of popular uprisings in Eastern Europe. One of the techniques it employed was automatic writing.

== School of thought ==
The onirist school of thought formed in Bucharest in 1964 around a nucleus composed of Dumitru Țepeneag and Leonid Dimov (writers who were members of the Luceafărul literary circle – named for the literary magazine Luceafărul, edited at the time by Eugen Barbu). There Țepeneag, Barbu and Dimov met Virgil Mazilescu, Vintilă Ivănceanu and Iulian Neacșu.

After Eugen Barbu was replaced as a leader of the circle by the ex-avant-garde writer Miron Radu Paraschivescu, Paraschivescu published a poetry-and-prose supplement to the magazine Ramuri called Povestea vorbei; his goal was a new avant-garde magazine uniting old and new oneiric poets and writers. In 1966 Vintilă Ivănceanu, Dumitru Țepeneag, Leonid Dimov and Virgil Mazilescu would all publish in Povestea vorbei before the magazine was summarily banned by the Stalinist government. Beginning in 1968, the center of the oneiric movement moved toward Luceafărul; there (in addition to the above-mentioned poets and writers), Emil Brumaru, Florin Gabrea, Sorin Titel, Daniel Turcea and others would publish.

Although it was rooted in world oniric literature (especially German Romanticism – considered by some critics to be a current related to surrealism – and new French fiction), the group was quickly banned by Romanian censorship and Țepeneag was forced into exile in Paris.

Many onirist writings remaining in Romania have recently been collected into a book by Corin Braga, a conservator of the aesthetics of onirism. Onirism extends into Romanian postmodernism in the works of Mircea Cărtărescu.

== In medicine ==
In psychiatry, onirism refers to a mental state in which visual hallucinations occur while fully awake. It is a symptom of some parasomnias (such as REM sleep behavior disorder and breakdown syndromes), but is more often associated with drug abuse.
