= Florin Pucă =

Romanian graphic artist

Florin Pucă (April 24, 1932 — February 23, 1990) was a Romanian graphic artist. He was also a close collaborator of Leonid Dimov's, having illustrated several of his literary works. Other writers Pucă illustrated for include Gheorghe Pituṭ, Mircea Micu, Nichita Stănescu, Petre Stoica, Ion Băieşu and Modest Morariu.

== Filmography ==
as actor

- Tatăl risipitor (1974)
- Mușchetarul român (1975)
- Red Apples (1976)
- Toate pînzele sus (serial TV, 1977) - ep. 1, 4-5
- Iancu Jianu, haiducul (1981)
- Ștefan Luchian (1981)
