= July Theses =

1971 speech by Romanian leader Nicolae Ceaușescu

The July Theses (Romanian: Tezele din iulie) was a speech delivered by Nicolae Ceaușescu to the executive committee of the Romanian Communist Party (PCR) on 6 July 1971.

The July Theses, officially named "Propuneri de măsuri pentru îmbunătățirea activității politico-ideologice, de educare marxist-leninistă a membrilor de partid, a tuturor oamenilor muncii" ("Proposed measures for the improvement of political-ideological activity, of the Marxist–Leninist education of Party members, of all working people"), was a quasi-Maoist speech influenced by Ceaușescu's recent state visits to the People's Republic of China and North Korea. The speech marked the beginning of a "mini-Cultural Revolution" in the Socialist Republic of Romania that saw a Neo-Stalinist reversal of the liberalization in the country since the early 1960s. The PCR launched an offensive against cultural autonomy in Romania and returned to the guidelines of socialist realism. Strict ideological conformity in the humanities and social sciences was demanded and non-compliant intellectuals were attacked. Competence and aesthetics were to be replaced by ideology, professionals were to be replaced by agitators, and culture was once again to become an instrument for communist propaganda. Romania's return to totalitarianism would be characterized by the extensive personality cult of Ceaușescu.

The July Theses, publicized as an official document of the PCR Plenum in their final version of early November 1971, carried the title: Expunere cu privire la programul PCR pentru îmbunătățirea activității ideologice, ridicarea nivelului general al cunoașterii și educația socialistă a maselor, pentru așezarea relațiilor din societatea noastră pe baza principiilor eticii și echității socialiste și comuniste ("Exposition regarding the PCR programme for improving ideological activity, raising the general level of knowledge and the socialist education of the masses, in order to arrange relations in our society on the basis of the principles of socialist and communist ethics and equity").

== Background ==
After a period of rigid Stalinism from 1948, cultural life in the Socialist Republic of Romania experienced a modest trend of liberalization and de-Stalinization in the early 1960s. Romanian leader Gheorghe Gheorghiu-Dej, the General Secretary of the Romanian Communist Party (PCR), had quietly pursued a "national communist" party line to reduce the influence of the Soviet Union. The Romanian government began to permit greater liberties and treat its citizens better, including an amnesty of political prisoners and allowing more freedom of expression, such as in the nuances that were appropriate in literature. Gheorghiu-Dej died in 1965 and was replaced by Nicolae Ceaușescu who, at first, actively continued the liberalization in Romania. This trend accelerated with the IXth Congress of the PCR in July 1965. A talented oppositional generation of writers emerged, including Nichita Stănescu, Ana Blandiana, Gabriel Liiceanu, Nicolae Manolescu, and Adrian Păunescu. Furthermore, at the PCR's Central Committee plenum in April 1968, Ceaușescu denounced Gheorghiu-Dej and rehabilitated Lucrețiu Pătrășcanu, executed just two days before Ceaușescu joined the Politburo, thus allowing him to claim innocence and to demote a key rival, Alexandru Drăghici. This opened up even more space for artistic expression in Romania. Eugen Barbu's novel Principele ("The Prince", 1969), though set in the Phanariot era, clearly refers to Gheorghiu-Dej—there is even reference to a project to build a canal that claims many of its builders' lives, a disguised reference to the Danube-Black Sea Canal. In Dumitru Radu Popescu's novel F, abuses committed during collectivization in Romania are explored. Augustin Buzura's novel Absenții ("The Absent Ones", 1970) went so far as to provide a critique of contemporary society, describing the spiritual crisis of a young doctor.

Censorship in Romania remained in place: Alexandru Ivasiuc and Paul Goma had both been imprisoned for their participation in the Bucharest student movement of 1956, and each wrote a novel about a man's prison experiences and efforts to readjust after his release. Goma's Ostinato describes prison life, Securitate methods and the excesses of collectivization. The censor asked for changes; eventually Goma published the book uncut in West Germany in the fall of 1971. Ivasiuc, in his Păsările ("The Birds"), complied with the censor's demands by justifying the protagonist's arrest and portraying the secret police in a positive light. Nevertheless, most writers were optimistic that the PCR would tolerate a broader range of themes in creative literature.

A thaw in relations with the United States also took place and brought with it an impact on citizens' lives. A Pepsi-Cola factory opened in Constanța in 1967, its product promoted in the press through American-style advertisements. The slogan "Pepsi, drive and energy" ran regularly in newspapers that just a few years earlier made no mention of Western products. Coca-Cola was not produced domestically, but could be found in bars and Comturist shops, stores with a restricted clientele where Western goods could be purchased in hard currency. In 1968, the first student bar/club opened in Bucharest; a writer for Viața Studențească described "low tables, discreet light... chewing gum and cigarettes, Pepsi and Coca-Cola, mechanical games, billiards... plus a few hours of interesting discussions. Here is why the club bar appears as an answer to a natural need for communication, for exchanging ideas and clashing opinions... in a relaxed atmosphere". Modern American art, harshly criticised during the period of socialist realism, began to receive favourable coverage, as seen during an exhibition (American Painting Since 1945) that opened in early 1969, featuring work by artists such as Jackson Pollock, Robert Rauschenberg and James Rosenquist. Even the US government received praise: President Richard Nixon's world tour of 1969 was closely followed, and the Apollo 11 Moon landing that July featured in advertisements, was broadcast live, occasioning warm greetings from Ceaușescu to Nixon and the American people. Probably the high point of Romanian-American relations during the Communist period came early the following month, when tens of thousands of enthusiastic Bucharesters welcomed Nixon, who became the first US president to visit an Eastern Bloc country during the Cold War.

== The Theses ==
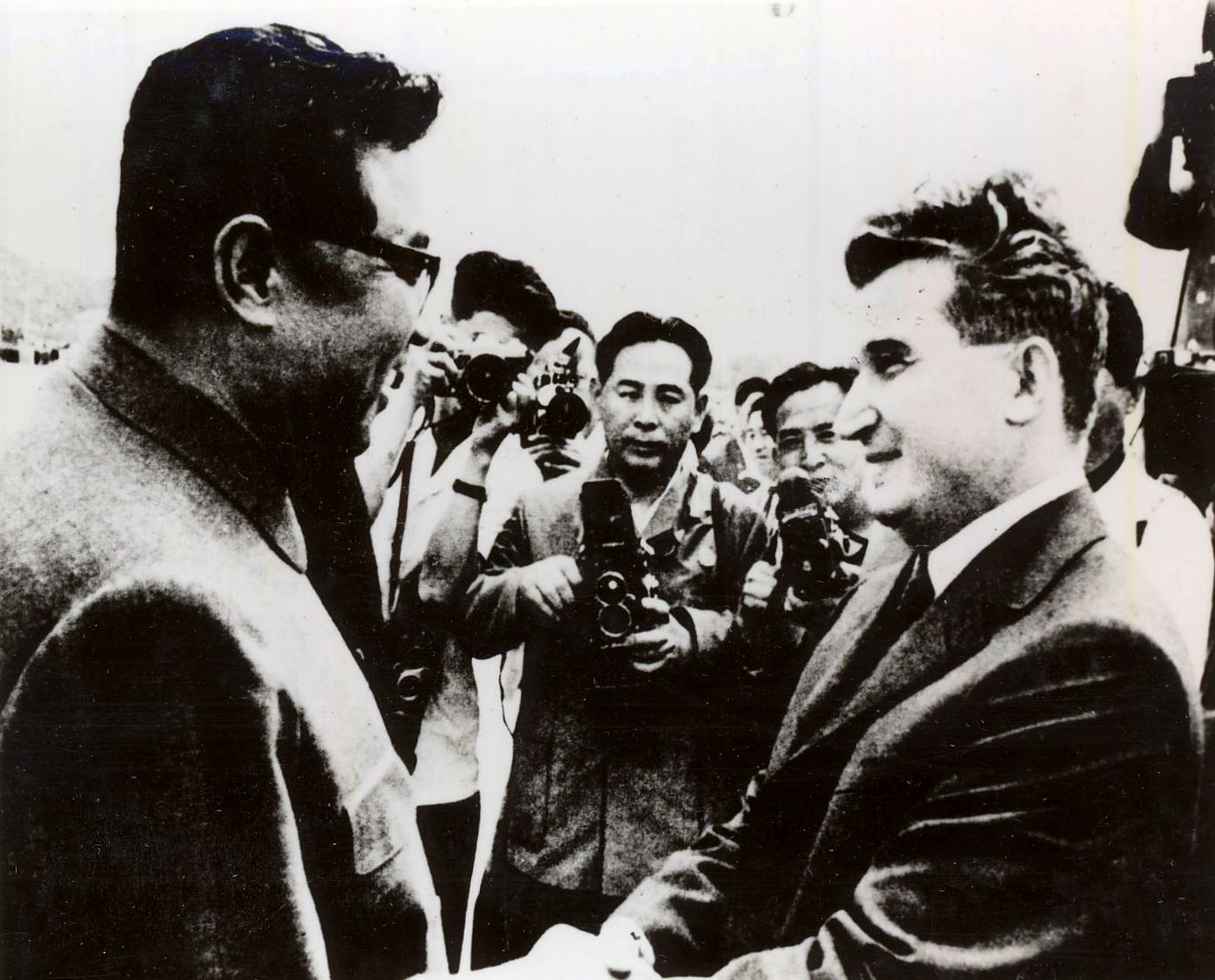
Ceaușescu meets Kim on 15 June 1971

In 1971, Ceaușescu went on state visits to the People's Republic of China, North Korea, North Vietnam and the Mongolian People's Republic. He was impressed by what he saw, taking great interest in the idea of a total national transformation as embodied in the programs of the Workers' Party of Korea and the Cultural Revolution. He was also inspired by the personality cults of North Korea's Kim Il Sung and China's Mao Zedong. Influenced by Kim Il Sung's Juche philosophy, he sought to emulate North Korea's system in Romania.

Ceaușescu, upon his return, issued the Theses which contained seventeen proposals. Among these were: continuous growth in the "leading role" of the Party; improvement of Party education and of mass political action; youth participation on large construction projects as part of their "patriotic work" (muncă patriotică); an intensification of political-ideological education in schools and universities, as well as in children's, youth and student organisations (like the Union of Communist Youth and its affiliates); and an expansion of political propaganda, orienting radio and television shows to this end, as well as publishing houses, theatres and cinemas, opera, ballet, artists' unions, and promoting a "militant, revolutionary" character in artistic productions. The liberalisation of 1965 was condemned, and an index of banned books and authors was re-established. Although presented in terms of "Socialist Humanism", the Theses in fact marked a return to socialist realism, reaffirming an ideological basis for literature that, in theory, the PCR had hardly abandoned. The difference was the addition of party-sponsored Romanian nationalism in historiography; quoting Nicolae Iorga in another speech in July 1971, Ceaușescu asserted that "the man who does not write for his entire people is not a poet", and presented himself as the defender of Romanian values.

== Impact ==
Especially after the Writers' Congress of 1968, PCR leaders started to clash with writers. Earlier that year Ceaușescu had announced: "the freedom of the individual is not in contradiction with the general demands and interests of society but, on the contrary, serves these interests". He managed to co-opt numerous intellectuals (many of them formerly apolitical or even oppositionist) and bring them into the PCR after condemning the Warsaw Pact's invasion of Czechoslovakia. However, the PCR began to intensify the struggle among writers as a group, and between them and the party. In 1970, awards of literary prizes brought the party leadership into open conflict with the Writers' Union of Romania. This determined the party to recover the privilege of granting such awards and of determining their standards of value. Despite these forebodings of conflict, the Theses with their promise of Neo-Stalinism, came as a shock. The PCR was supposed to supervise the Theses' implementation closely and meticulously, but it was unable to do so with the same efficacy as in the 1950s. In part, this was due to the artistic community, which was numbed by the proposals and roused into a temporary united front against them. Zaharia Stancu and Eugen Jebeleanu, long associated with the communist regime, joined in protest with younger writers like Buzura, Păunescu, Popescu, and Marin Sorescu. Leonid Dimov and Dumitru Țepeneag denounced the proposals on Radio Free Europe in Paris, and Nicolae Breban, editor-in-chief of România Literară, resigned while in West Germany and attacked the Theses in an interview with Le Monde. Writers appeared combative at a meeting with Ceaușescu in Neptun.

The PCR issued its own counter-measures. For instance, a law passed in December 1971 prohibited the broadcasting or publication abroad of any written material that might prejudice the interest of the state. Romanian citizens were also forbidden from having any contact with foreign radio stations or newspapers, as this was considered hostile to Romania. One man who had submitted a volume of poetry to a critic for evaluation was tried for having written "hostile" verse; despite the critic having come to defend him, a military court sentenced him to 12 years' imprisonment.

In advance of the National Writers' Conference in May 1972, the writers' initial solidarity was destroyed by infighting, though not by the PCR had which temporarily withdrew into the background. After Ștefan Bănulescu resigned as editor of Luceafărul, Păunescu fought with Fănuș Neagu for the position, which went to someone else, causing Neagu to leave the opposition. Initial supporters of the Theses included Eugen Barbu, Aurel Baranga and Mihnea Gheorghiu; Nichita Stănescu also claimed to have received them with "a particular joy" and to regard them as "a real aid to culture". Writers felt resentment at Goma's success in West Germany and at Țepeneag's having been translated into French. The PCR exploited this by persuading the Writers' Union to hold its 1972 congress with delegates elected by secret ballot, not by a general assembly — delegates would choose one of two names offered to them. By the time of the July 1972 National Party Conference, the cultural elite's strategies and the conflicts that would dominate the 1970s and 1980s had crystallized. Dissident Monica Lovinescu describes four features of the literary scene in Romania until 1989: intermittent courage; position in the social order transformed into an aesthetic criterion; the efficacy of some means of corruption; and a breakdown between generations, with many young oppositionists ready to compromise and some older writers ready to resist.

The PCR offered increased royalties and pensions and played upon writers' envy, which led to the exclusion of Goma and Țepeneag, who failed to be elected by secret ballot and were jeered when they spoke at the Union delegate election meeting before the conference. There, it was also claimed that Goma had no talent. While writers like Blandiana, Buzura, Ștefan Augustin Doinaș and Marin Sorescu refused to conform, maintaining moral and artistic integrity, Goma and Țepeneag were targeted for their readiness to challenge the PCR's cultural dictates. Other writers were anxious not to jeopardise their privileges and afraid that the PCR might use the Theses to bring new "writers" into a rebellious Union. They instead preferred subtle evasion of their constraints and so were reluctant to back the pair of more outspoken dissidents. Within three years, the balance of power in the writers' community had shifted from the 1960s generation to the protochronists. Writers eager for greater influence could now obtain it by specialising in the production of ideology. These included both figures on the decline who hoped to revive their careers, such as Barbu (whose career had suffered at the expense of oppositionists), and younger writers like Păunescu, an initial opponent. The two factions remained in open conflict for a decade, but by 1981 the PCR had rendered the Union impotent by freezing its funds and restricting its activities — no more Writers' Conferences were allowed after that year. Instead, with the greater emphasis on ideology, force, and centralisation, and with more funds, the protochronists remained more influential until the Romanian Revolution in 1989, having been reinforced by the "Mangalia Theses" in the summer of 1982. Particularly in the 1980s, Romanian culture and science became increasingly isolated internationally.

Also as a result of the Theses, sociology was removed as a university discipline and what was left was taught at the PCR's Ștefan Gheorghiu Academy. The number of those allowed to study non-technical subjects at the university was sharply cut; fewer books were published; and the privileges formerly accorded to intellectuals were reduced.

=== Cult of personality ===
Ceaușescu began to develop a cult of personality around himself, influenced by the personality cult surrounding Kim Il Sung in North Korea, which would become the most extensive in the Eastern Bloc. He was hailed as a genius communist theoretician, glorified by the state media, and his image was ubiquitous in Romania. State television were given strict orders to portray him in a flattering light at all times. Ceaușescu became an almost infallible figure, above any criticism, which allowed him to obtain even more power than he had already possessed. The personality cult would later be extended to his wife, Elena Ceaușescu. The prestigious Romanian Academy was forced to take on Elena as a member in 1974. She had earned a bachelor's degree in chemistry in the 1950s, though her competence and achievements were greatly exaggerated due to her husband. Elena was portrayed as an exceptional chemistry researcher, winning many honorary awards and being appointed to a number of high positions within the scientific community. Elena politicized the Romanian Academy to such an extent that its prestige and much of its serious research were destroyed.
