= Leonid Dimov =

Romanian postmodernist poet and translator

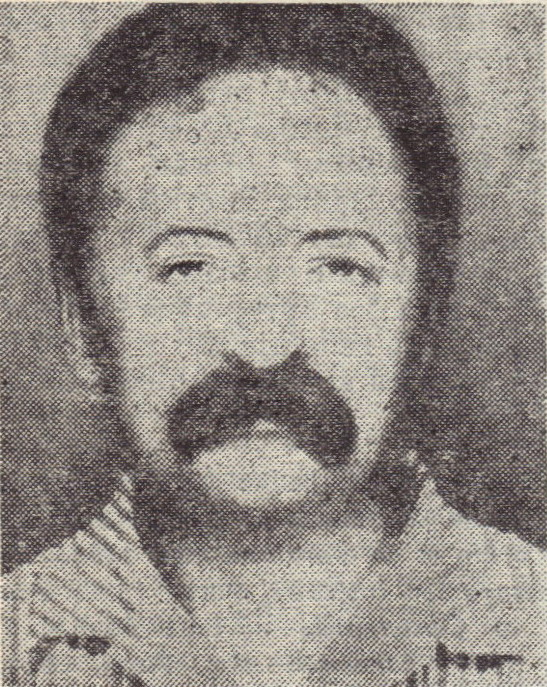
Leonid Dimov

Leonid Dimov (Romanian pronunciation: [le.oˈnid diˈmov]: Bulgarian: Леонид Димов; January 11, 1926 – December 5, 1987) was a Romanian postmodernist poet and translator. He was one of the main representatives (together with, amongst others, Dumitru Țepeneag) of onirism in Romanian poetry, explorer of the dream as an absolute, objective reality.

== Biography ==
He was born in Izmail, Bessarabia, the son of Nadejda Dimov and Naum Mordcovici. He graduated from the Saint Sava High School in Bucharest. Then he studied for three years at the philology department of the University of Bucharest. Without graduating, he studied again for three years at the biology department. After a dispute (it seems that he questioned at a seminar the logic of Michurinist science), he was expelled. He also followed courses in law and mathematics at the same University of Bucharest.

In 1957 he was arrested for urinating on a statue of Joseph Stalin in Bucharest, but was released after two months due to lack of evidence.

His literary debut came rather late, in 1965, when he published some poems in the Viața Românească magazine, where Șerban Cioculescu, Dimov's old French teacher, had become chief editor. Soon after, Miron Radu Paraschivescu, the editor in charge of the literary supplement "Poveste vorbei" of the Ramuri magazine in Craiova, also let Dimov publish some poems.

His first book, Versuri ("Poems"), was published in December 1966. After becoming a member of the Writers' Union of Romania, he was hired as an editor at the România literară magazine in 1970, where he worked until 1975, when he went into early retirement due to illness.

He was married twice: the first time, to Lucia Salam (with whom he had a daughter, Tatiana, born in 1952), and the second time, to Ana-Marina Voinescu (whose daughter, Ileana—born in 1957 from her marriage to Teodor Pâcă—he would adopt as his own child).

He continued to publish until shortly before his death, the last published poems being Sonete pentru Irina ("Sonets for Irina"), dedicated to his granddaughter Irina (Ileana's daughter).

In an age and society where many Romanian poets and writers compromised their conscience in order to be able to publish more, Dimov was not an outright political dissident, but rather a nonconformist, one of the few who refused to praise the regime, a fact that brought him to the attention of the Romanian secret police, the feared Securitate.

He died of a heart attack.

== "Carte de vise" ==
Carte de vise ("Book of Dreams") was published in 1969, at Editura pentru Literatură, with cover and illustrations by Florin Pucă. The book is divided into four cycles:

- Hipnagogice
- 7 proze
- La capătul somnului
- Poeme de veghe

== Translations ==
He translated from Marcel Raymond, Curzio Malaparte, Gérard de Nerval, Andrei Belyi, and Mikhail Lermontov.

== Output ==
- Versuri (1966)
- 7 poeme (1968)
- Pe malul Styxului (1968)
- Carte de vise (1969)
- Semne cerești (1970)
- Eleusis (1970)
- Deschideri (1972)
- A.B.C. (1973)
- La capăt (1974)
- Litanii pentru Horia (1975)
- Dialectica vârstelor (1977)
- Tinerețe fără bătrânețe (1978)
- Spectacol (1979)
- Veșnica reîntoarcere (1982)

Other editions and anthologies:

- A.B.C., Ed. Cartea Românească, 1973
- Texte, Introduction by Mircea Iorgulescu, Ed. Albatros
- Cele mai frumoase poezii, 1980; Poetry, edited, postscript, chronological table and critical references by Nicolae Barna, Ed. Grammar, 2000.
- Leonid Dimov, „Opera poetică”, vol. I-II, foreword by Ion Bogdan Lefter, Editura Paralela 45, 2010
- Theoretical texts, very important for the understanding of the aesthetical onirism, written by Leonid Dimov and Dumitru Țepeneag, can be found in Corin Braga Momentul oniric, Ed. Cartea Românească, 1997.

== Prizes and honours ==
- The Romanian Writers' Union Prize, 1979
- The Bucharest Writers' Union Prize, 1968, 1977, 1982

== Bibliography ==
- Viorel Mureșan, Traian Ștef, Leonid Dimov (monography), Editura Aula, Colecția „Canon“, Brașov, 2000.
- Leonid Dimov, Dumitru Țepeneag, Onirismul estetic, Ed. Curtea Veche, 2007
- Luminița Corneanu, Leonid Dimov. Un oniric în Turnul Babel, Polirom, 2014
- Corina Sabău, Poet Leonid Dimov http://www.rri.ro/en_gb/poet_leonid_dimov-22453
