= Miron Radu Paraschivescu =

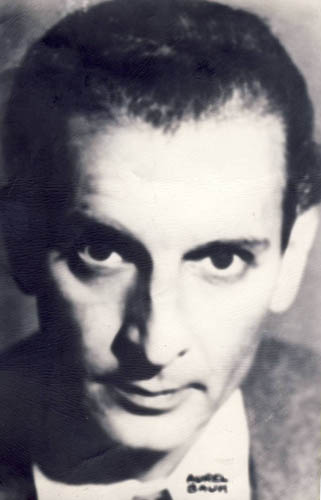
- Born: 2 October 1911; Zimnicea, Teleorman County, Kingdom of Romania
- Died: 17 February 1971 (aged 59); Bucharest, Socialist Republic of Romania
- Citizenship: Romania
- Education: Department of Letters and Philosophy
- Alma mater: University of Bucharest
- Writing career
- Pen name: MRP
- Language: Romanian
- Period: 1929–1971
- Notable work: Cântice țigănești
- Notable awards: The Romanian Academy's "George Coșbuc" Award (1956)

Miron Radu Paraschivescu (Romanian pronunciation: [miˈron ˈradu ˌparaskiˈvesku]; 2 October 1911 – 17 February 1971) was a Romanian poet, essayist, journalist, and translator.

Born in Zimnicea, Teleorman County, he went to high school in Ploiești, after which he studied fine arts, first in Cluj and later in Bucharest, without graduating. He then enrolled at the Letters and Philosophy Department of the University of Bucharest.

A leftist in his youth (he joined the Union of Communist Youth in 1933), he wrote for many leftist papers and magazines of those days: "Cuvîntul liber", "Azi", "Facla", "Viața românească", "Era nouă", "Lumea românească", "Timpul", "Ecoul", "România Liberă", "Scînteia", sometimes under a pen name, among them Emil Soare and Paul Scorțeanu. After World War II, he wrote many propagandistic articles, although it seems that he never became a member of the Communist Party itself.

Being on friendly terms with many communist leaders from their days in the underground, including Miron Constantinescu, Constanța Crăciun, Iosif Chișinevschi, Leonte Răutu, he was considered "invulnerable", and got away with criticizing the regime, mostly in private, when anybody else would have ended in prison for the same offence. Although he hoped, due to his antifascist past, to be given important government positions like his former comrades, he never got any, being sent instead to work for several magazines and papers.

He and Sorin Toma bitterly criticized Tudor Arghezi in 1948, accusing the latter of being a representative of "decadent, bourgeois art".

In 1965, Paraschivescu took charge of the readers' column at the literary magazine Ramuri in Craiova, changing it in May 1966 into a four-page literary supplement called Povesta vorbei ("The Tale of Talk"). It lasted only six numbers. He transformed it into a meeting place for a number of young avant-garde writers who had difficulty getting published by the established literary press. Among them were Leonid Dimov, Virgil Mazilescu, and Dumitru Țepeneag.

Known for being sometimes a "difficult person" and a "big mouth", Paraschivescu was hospitalized at least twice in mental institutions.

Somewhat of a Don Juan, Paraschivescu was married five times.

== Writings ==
- Oameni și așezări din Țara Moților și a Basarabilor, Craiova, 1938
- Cântice țigănești, București, 1941; illustrated by Marcel Chirnoagă, București, 1972
- Pâine, pământ și țărani, Craiova, 1943
- Cântare României, București, 1951
- Laude, București, 1953
- Laude şi alte poeme, București, 1959
- Declarația patetică, București, 1960
- Poezii, București, 1961
- Declaraţia patetică. Cântice țigănești. Laude și alte poeme, București, 1963
- Bâlci la Râureni, București, 1964
- Versul liber, București, 1965
- Drumuri şi răspântii, București, 1967
- Tristele, București, 1968
- Scrieri, vol. I-II, București, 1969, vol. III-IV, București, 1974–1975
- Poeme, București, 1971
- Ultimele, București, 1971
- Poezii, edited and afterword by Ioan Adam, București, 1973
- Amintiri, București, 1975
- Journal d'un heretique, translated by Claude Jaillet, foreword by de Virgil Ierunca, Paris, 1976; edition (Jurnalul unui cobai. 1940–1954), edited by Maria Cordoneanu, foreword by Vasile Igna, Cluj Napoca, 1994
- Povestind copiilor, București, 1990
- Jurnalul unui cobai, 1994
- Poeme, Iaşi, 2000

== Translations ==
- Marie-Anne Desmarest, Torente, București, 1943
- Konstantin Simonov, Apărarea Moscovei, București, 1944
- Nikolai Tikhonov, Istorisiri din Leningrad, București, 1944
- Mikhail Sholokhov, Şcoala urii, București, 1944
- Jean Richard Bloch, Toulon, București, 1945
- Alexander Pushkin, Basme..., illustrated by Th. Kiriacoff-Suruceanu, București, 1945, Ruslan și Ludmila, București, 1951
- Translations of eight European poets, illustrated by Mircea Alitanti, București, 1946
- Claude Roy, Parisul răsculat, București, 1946
- Maxim Gorki, Univesităţile mele, București, 1948
- Nikolay Nekrasov, Poeme alese, București, 1953, Gerul, moşu cu nasu roşu, București, 1955, Opere alese, I-III, București, 1955–1959, Femeile ruse. Decembristele, București, 1956
- Adam Mickiewicz, Pan Tadeusz sau Ultima încălcare de pământ în Lituania, foreword by Olga Zaicik, București, 1956, Poezii, București, 1957 (with Vlaicu Bârna şi Virgil Teodorescu), Poezii, București 1959
- Juliusz Słowacki, Ceasul meditării, illustrated by Mihu Vulcănescu, București, 1962
- Giuseppe Ungaretti, Poezii, București, 1963 (with Alexandru Balaci)
- Andre Malraux, Calea regală, București, 1971

== Awards ==
- The Romanian Academy's "George Coșbuc" Award (1956)
- Honorary citizen of Vălenii de Munte (post-mortem, 2011)
