= Corin Braga =

Romanian scholar and prose writer

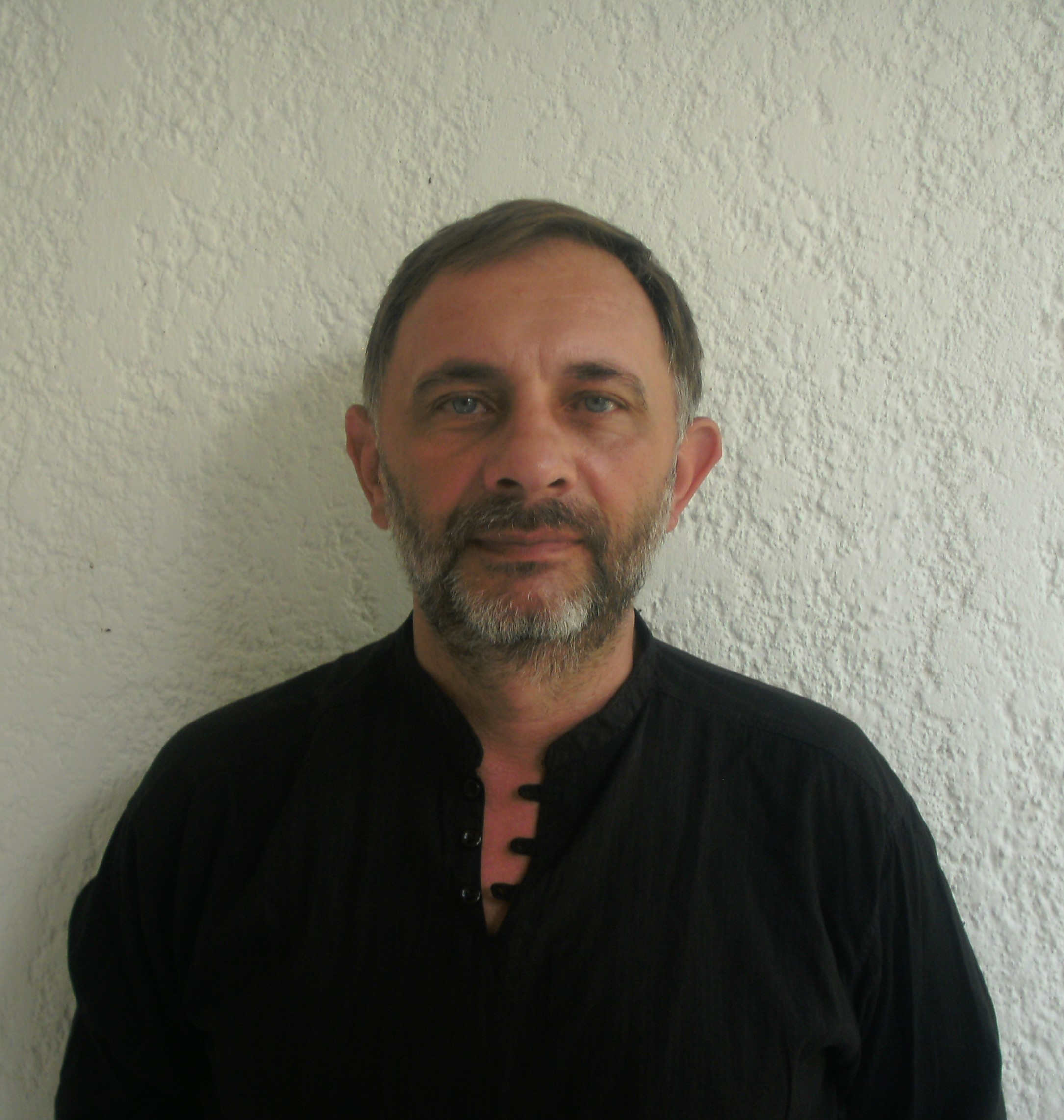
- Corin Braga (2008)
- Born: January 12, 1961 (age 65); Baia Mare, Romania
- Education: Babeș-Bolyai University; Jean Moulin University Lyon 3
- Occupations: Writer, academic
- Employer: Babeș-Bolyai University
- Spouse: Ruxandra Cesereanu

Corin Braga (born 12 January 1961), is a Romanian writer and academic. He is a literary theoretician and translator.

== Education and early career ==
Braga was born in 1961 in Baia Mare, Romania. After a degree in Romanian and Spanish language and literature from the Babeș-Bolyai University in Cluj-Napoca, he taught Romanian language and literature at the Andrei Mureșanu High School in Bistrița until 1988, when he became a literary consultant for the Radu Stanca National Theatre in Sibiu.

From 1990 to 1997, he worked on a doctorate in literature at his alma mater. His research at the Institute of Linguistic and Literary History in Cluj contributed to the production of a Chronological Dictionary of the Romanian Novel. In 1993, Braga became assistant professor in comparative literature at the Babeș-Bolyai University. Since 1996, Braga has contributed to the production of the Analytical Dictionary of Romanian Literary Works and, since 1998, he has contributed to the Dictionary of Romanian Writers.

== Later career ==
Braga continued teaching at the Babes-Bolyai University as associate professor and then full professor since 2007. Between 2000 and 2008, he earned a second PhD in philosophy from the Jean Moulin University in Lyon, France. In 2008 he was elected Dean of the Faculty of Letters at the Babeș-Bolyai University, and in 2020 Vice-rector of the Babeș-Bolyai University.

In 2001 he founded the academic journal Caietele Echinox., and in 2002 he founded Phantasma, the Center for Imagination Studies at the Faculty of Letters in Cluj-Napoca.

He is a correspondent member of the Academia Nacional de Ciencias de Buenos Aires, Argentina, and of Academia Europaea (The Academy of Europe). He was appointed as the vice-president of the Romanian Association of General and Comparative Literature in 2011, and as the vice-president of the Centre de Recherches Internationales sur l'Imaginaire (CRI2i). in 2012. He is also a member of Uniunea Scriitorilor din Romania since 1994, of PEN Club Romania since 2001, of AILC-ICLA (Association Internationale de Littérature Comparée – International Comparative Literature Association) since 2016, and of ESCL-SELC (European Society of Comparative Literature – Société Européenne de Littérature Comparée) since 2022.

He is the director of the academic journals Studia Universitatis Babeş-Bolyai Series Philologia and Caietele Echinox. He is a member of the advisory boards of the Collection Caffé dei filosofi, Mimesis Edizioni, Italy; Collection Danubiana. Immagini e libri dalla Romania, Aracné Edizioni, Italy; and Collection icovidivoci, Artetetra Edizioni, Italy.

Braga has published 11 volumes of essays in Romanian as well as in French, 6 volumes of prose and over 300 papers.

== Literary and philosophical work ==
=== Noctambulii ===
Braga's most famous work is Noctambulli, a series of four novels written in Oniric style of writing, which is a writing technique introduced by the Romanian Onirist writers in the 1960s. Four books in the series, Claustrofobul, Hidra, Luiza Textoris, and Claustrofobul were published in 1992, 1996, 2012 and 2022 respectively. He has also written two journals of dreams, Oniria (1985-1995), in 1999, and Acedia.(1998-2007), in 2014. The latter received critical acclaim and won Great Prize at FestLit (National Festival of Literature) Cluj.

In 1992, Braga published the first book in the series Noctambulii, which translates to Night-Walkers, indicating the oneiric tone of the novels. The plot of all the novels is not dictated by logic, but by magic and dreaming. The first book, Claustrofobul tells the story of Anir Margus, a young geologist, who is entrusted with the job of stopping water deep in the layers of soil from flooding a town named Clusium. Anir manages to send the rising water into deeper layers of the soil, and he is elected ruler of the town, replacing Holom, the former president. However, the absorption of the water provokes a hole in the ground, crumbling of buildings and landslides. Through the manipulation of Holom, Anir is removed by a public upheaval and executed in a fountain monument. A sequel to the Claustrofobul, entitled Hidra, was published in 1996. Hidra tells the story of Adela Vlaia, Anir's fiancé, who after his execution throws herself in the water monument. However, instead of dying, she dives into another underground world, parallel to Clusium. She travels across this world to find Anir and while doing so, she lives her life in reverse order.

The third book in the series, Luiza Textoris, was published in 2012. Luiza Textoris reverses the perspective of the first two novels. The main character of the story, Luiza, is a teenage girl who dreams so much that she begins to lose the sense of reality and starts living psychotic delirium episodes. In order to help her, her boyfriend, Fulviu Friator, who practices yoga and meditation, teaches her how to create a dream-double, an alternative personality emerging in dreams in order to relieve the original of experiencing traumatic nocturnal episodes. Luiza and Fulviu start dreaming together. In the dream world, Anir and Adela, the characters of the first two novels, appear to be the dream doubles of Luiza and Fulviu, which connects the story of the four. In a review about Luiza Textoris, Echinox Magazine wrote that "although, in a first reading, the novel is overcrowded and confused, and some events seem to be not logically linked or difficult to justify, it must always be remembered that we are dealing with a well-built oniric novel; not everything has to make sense from the beginning and the overall atmosphere that it has to leave is that of a dream, of a logic behind the usual logic."

The fourth novel, Ventrilocul (published in 2019), is focused on Fulviu Friator, presenting his life before and after meeting Luiza Textoris. The young adult discovers that the way of rescuing Luiza is to liberate her dream-double from the "hydra", but in order to do this they have to go even deeper into the past of the Textoris family (Textor in Latin means weaver, as the Moiras, the weavers of destiny). The origin of all tragedies in their past (as the accidental death of Fulviu's parents) seem to origin in the course that an ancestor of Luiza and Fulviu, Holom Ludlum (the menacing figure from Anir and Adela adventures) had cast over his successors. Cancelling the course, Fulviu and Luiza are able to recuperate their lost dream-doubles, Anir and Adela. This not only heals them from delirium and catatonia, but also transforms them into magical beings, able to control reality through their dreams. Gratiela Benga notes: "Obsessed by oneirism and multiverses, that he also investigates in academic studies and dream diaries (Oniria and Acedia), Corin Braga explores alternative worlds through the net of a labyrinthine and multilayered narrative. [...] As epic amplitude, Corin Braga's oneiric tetralogy is one of the sound prose projects after 1990, along with the trilogies by Gabriela Adamesteanu, Caius Dobrescu and Nicolae Breban. Thematically, the project is unique."

=== Failed quests for paradise and utopia ===
In European comparative literature Braga has done extensive research on the topic of the failed quest of literary characters to find Paradise, Utopia or other sacred places on Earth, on which he has written five books in French. Two of these volumes are dedicated to the topic of the Paradise lost in European medieval literature. In the first volume, Le Paradis Interdit au Moyen Âge. I. La Quête Manquée de l'Éden Oriental, published in 2004, he studies the genesis of the myth of the Garden of Eden and various Christian versions of the failed quest of a divine garden prohibited after the original sin. In the second volume, Le Paradis Interdit au Moyen Âge. II. La Quête Manquée de l'Avalon Occidentale, published in 2006, he analyses a complementary corpus of legends, based on Celtic, especially Irish mythology. Reviewing the second volume in Revue de l'histoire des Religions, Anna Caiozzo, wrote that "the author's approach is a true synthesis of all the myths that have presided over the construction of an image of paradise on the eastern borders of the world as places both eschatological and promises of personal fulfillment."

Du Paradis Perdu à l'Antiutopie aux XVIi^{e}-XVIII^{e} Siècles, which was published in 2010, was his next work on the topic. In it, Braga continued the analysis of the failed quests during the Renaissance era. He showed that Thomas More opened a new tradition, in which the Garden of God was supplemented by the City of Man. Utopia became thus a successor of the Terrestrial Paradise and of the Golden Age. In 2012, Braga wrote Les Antiutopies Classiques, in which he revisited the concept of utopia and utopianism, but this time "in terms of its most inauspicious feature: the destructive side of a literary imaginary society."

In a fifth volume, entitled Pour Une Morphologie du Genre Utopique, published in 2018, Braga complements the historical investigation with a paradigmatic approach of the Utopian genre. Starting from the theory of possible worlds, and from the main instruments of "world-making" (separation, extrapolation, projection, reversal, reduction to absurd), Braga makes a typological distinction between four classes of the utopian genre: outopias (impossible good worlds), eutopias (possible good worlds), dystopias (possible bad worlds) and antiutopias (impossible bad worlds).

=== Hermeneutics and literary theory ===
In literary theory and hermeneutics, Braga focuses on concepts such as imagination studies ("recherches sur l'imaginaire"), human universals and archetypes, and has coined paired concepts such as anarchetype and eschatype. In the vein of the French school of "recherches sur l'imaginaire" (G. Bachelard, G. Durand), he works on the distinction between imagination (pure fantasy), imaginary (human faculty for invention) and imaginal (transpersonal representations). Using this approach, he directed Enciclopedia imaginariilor din România (2020), a five-volume encyclopedia making a cartography of the literary, linguistic, historical, religious and art representations of Romanian cultural imaginaries and patrimony.

In the books 10 Studii de Arhetipologie, and then in Archétypologie postmoderne. D'Œdipe à Umberto Eco, Braga made the distinction between three definitions of the concept of archetype (ontological, psychological and cultural), which can be used as bases for multidisciplinary hermeneutics in literary analyses. While the third definition applies to comparative literature in order to describe macrostructures in the construction of fictional worlds, the first and the second ones are philosophical definitions which were given, along the history of ideas, to the universals describing even the objective structure of the macro-universe (the world as a whole), or the inner categories of the micro-universe (the human psyche). These can be seen as "méga-récits", theoretical explanations specific to different historical paradigms, towards which the researcher should adopt a "distant theory" position.

In De la Arhetip la Anarhetip (2006), Braga defined the "anarchetype" as a different pattern for cultural, religious, literary and art works, alternative to the concept of archetype (or human universal). Reviewing the book, Andrea Cornea wrote in Idei in dialog that "the chapters dedicated to the premodern cartographic imaginary are not only charming and full of substance, but also written with an admirable competence, understanding and adequacy that makes them highly recommendable to anyone studying medieval or Renaissance imagery, and generally to anyone who wants to understand how it worked the European collective imaginary". The concept of anarchetype, describing works which are similar to rhizomes rather than trees, should be able to rescue genres and works which are generally considered non-canonical and are prejudicially under-valued.

== Awards ==
- 1993 - Award for debut in literary criticism, at the National Book Fair, Cluj
- 2005 - Henri Jacquier Award, from the Romanian Writers Association, Cluj
- 2005 - Award of the Romanian Association of General and Comparative Literature
- 2007 - Award for Literary Criticism by the Romanian Writers Association
- 2007 - National Prize for Literary History and Criticism "Petru Creţia", Memorialul Ipoteşti
- 2009 - Chevalier de l'Ordre des Palmes Académiques, France
- 2012 - Award for Literary Criticism by the Romanian Writers Association, Cluj
- 2014 - Prose Award by Tiuk! literary review
- 2015 - Great Prize at FestLit (National Festival of Literatură), Cluj
- 2015 - Ion Hobana Award from the Romanian Writers Association, Bucharest
- 2017 - Prize "I. Negoițescu" of the Apostrof cultural review, for opera omnia, Cluj
- 2019 - Lucia Wald Award of Societatea de Studii Clasice, Bucharest, for Anonym. Călătoria Sfântului abate Brendan
- 2020 - Lucian Blaga Prize of the Romanian Academy, Bucharest, for Pour une morphologie du genre utopique
- 2021 - Prize of the Romanian Association of General and Comparative Literature, for Enciclopedia imaginariilor din România
- 2021 - Special Prize of Observator cultural, Bucharest, for Enciclopedia imaginariilor din România
- 2021 - Titu Maiorescu Award of Muzeul Național al Literaturii Române, Bucharest, for Enciclopedia imaginariilor din România

== Bibliography ==
=== Noctambulii ===
- Noctambulii (Night-Walkers).
- I. Claustrofobul [Claustrophobus] (1992)
- II.Hidra [Hydra]. (1996)
- III.Luiza Textoris. (2012)
- IV. Ventrilocul [Ventriloquist]. (2022)

=== Quest for Paradise ===
- Le Paradis Interdit au Moyen Âge. I. La Quête Manquée de l'Eden Oriental. (2004)
- Le Paradis Interdit au Moyen Âge. II. La Quête Manquée de l'Avalon Occidentale. (2006)
- Du Paradis Perdu à l'Antiutopie aux XVI^{e}-XVIII^{e} siècles. (2010)
- Les Antiutopies Classiques. (2012)
- Pour Une Morphologie du Genre Utopique. (2018)

=== Other volumes ===
- Nichita Stănescu - Orizontul Imaginar [The Imaginary Horizon of Nichita Stănescu]. (1993)
- Lucian Blaga. Geneza Lumilor Imaginare [The Genesis of Lucian Blaga's Fictional Worlds]. (1998)
- Oniria. Jurnal de Vise (1985-1995) [Oniria. Dream Diary]. (1999)
- 10 Studii de Arhetipologie [10 Studies in Archetypology]. (1999)
- De la Arhetip la Anarhetip [From Archetype to Anarchetype]. (2006)
- Concepte și Metode în Cercetarea Imaginarului (ed.) [Concepts and Methods in the Study of the Imagination]. (2007)
- Psihobiografii [Psycho-biographies]. (2011)
- Acedia. Jurnal de Vise (1998-2007) [Acedia. Dream Diary]. (2014)
- Morfologia Lumilor Posibile. Utopie, Antiutopie, Science-fiction, Fantasy [The Morphology of Possible Worlds. Utopia, Dystopia, Science-Fiction, Fantasy]. (2015)
- Archétypologie postmoderne. D'Œdipe à Umberto Eco. (2019)
- Enciclopedia imaginariilor din România (ed.) [Encyclopedia of Romanian Imaginaries]. vol. 1 (Imaginar literar), vol. 2 (Patrimoniu și imaginar lingvistic), vol. 3 (Imaginar istoric), vol. 4 (Imaginar religious), vol. 5 (Imaginar și patrimoniu artistic) (2020)
- Concepte și Metode în Cercetarea Imaginarului. Invitații Phantasma (ed.) [Concepts and Methods in the Study of the Imagination. Phantasma guest speakers]. (2021)

=== Translated volumes ===
- Wilfred R. Bion, Second Thoughts. Selected Essays on Psycho-Analysis, Translated from the English by Carmen Bujdei and Florin V. Vlădescu, in collaboration with Corin Braga, Sigmund Freud Publishing House, New York, 1993
- Andrew Samuels, Bani Shorter and Fred Plaut, A Critical Dictionary of Jungian Analysis, Translated from the English by Corin Braga, Sigmund Freud Publishing House, New York, 1995; 2nd edition, Humanitas, Bucharest, 2005
- Gilbert Durand, An Introduction to Mythodology. Myths and Societies, Translated from the French by Corin Braga, Dacia Publishing House, Cluj, 2005
- Philippe Walter, Limba păsărilor [The Language of Birds], În românește de Andreea Hopârtean și Corin Braga, Cluj, Dacia, Colecția "Mundus imaginalis", 2007
