= Virgil Mazilescu =

Romanian poet, essayist and translator

- Born: 11 April 1942; Corabia, Kingdom of Romania
- Died: August 13, 1984 (aged 42); Bucharest, Socialist Republic of Romania
- Resting place: Cernica Monastery
- Citizenship: Romania
- Education: Department of Romanian Language and Literature
- Alma mater: University of Bucharest
- Occupations: poet, essayist, translator
- Spouse: Ștefania
- Writing career
- Language: Romanian
- Period: 1968–1984
- Literary movement: Onirism

Virgil Mazilescu (Romanian pronunciation: [virˈd͡ʒil maziˈlesku]; born 11 April 1942, Corabia, Olt County, Romania — died 10 August 1984, Bucharest, Romania) was a Romanian poet, essayist, and translator.

== Life ==
After finishing the Spiru Haret High School in Bucharest in 1957, he enrolled in the Department of Romanian Language and Literature of the University of Bucharest, from where he graduated in 1964. After stints as a school teacher in Greaca, Giurgiu and as a librarian in Ploiești, he worked from 1970 until his death as a copy editor for România Literară. For a few years he was the secretary of the Writers' Union of Romania's literary circle, led by Miron Radu Paraschivescu.

A bohemian, who was also known for his heavy drinking, he died on 10 August 1984. He was buried at Cernica Monastery, in Pantelimon, Ilfov.

== Literary activity ==
In 1966 he made his literary debut in Povestea vorbei, the monthly avantgarde literary supplement of the magazine Ramuri from Craiova, edited by Miron Radu Paraschivescu.

=== Books ===
- Versuri, București, Editura pentru Literatură, 1968
- Fragmente din regiunea de odinioară, București, Editura Cartea Românească, 1970
- Va fi liniște, va fi seară, București, Editura Cartea Românească, 1979
- Guillaume poetul și administratorul, București, Editura Cartea Românească, 1983

==== Posthumously ====
- Asketische Zeichen. Gedichte, Cluj, Editura Dacia, 1988, 2001
- Întoarcerea lui Immanuel, București, Editura Albatros, 1991
- Poezii, București, Editura Vitruviu, 1996
- Opere complete, editor: Alexandru Condeescu, București, Editura Muzeul Literaturii Române, 2003
- Opera poetica, editor: Gabriel Nedelea, Craiova, Editura AIUS, 2013

=== Translations ===
He translated works by, among others, Jean Amila, Jack Schaefer, Fernand Fournier-Aubry, Henri Delacroix, Charles Portis, and Willa Cather.

== Awards ==
- "Luceafărul” Magazine Award, 1968, for Versuri

== Legacy ==
A school in his home town is named after him.
