= Dumitru Țepeneag =

Romanian writer and translator (born 1937)

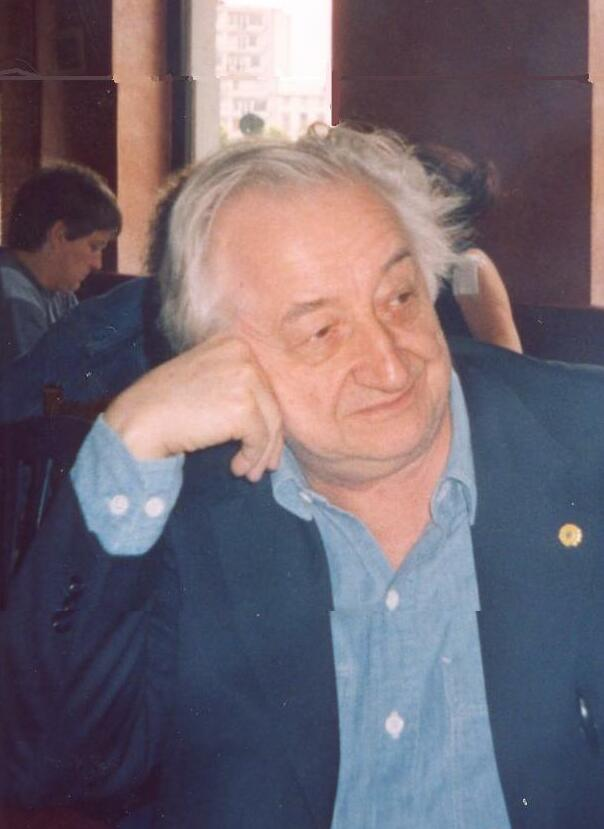
- Born: February 14, 1937 (age 89); Bucharest, Romania
- Occupations: Novelist; short story writer; essayist
- Writing career
- Period: 1966–
- Notable works: Vain Art of the Fugue, Hôtel Europa, Pigeon Post

Dumitru Țepeneag (also known under the pen names Ed Pastenague and Dumitru Tsepeneag; b. February 14, 1937) is a contemporary Romanian novelist, essayist, short story writer and translator, who currently resides in France. He was one of the founding members of the Oniric group, and a theoretician of the Onirist trend in Romanian literature, while becoming noted for his activities as a dissident. In 1975, the Communist regime stripped him of his citizenship. He settled down in Paris, where he was a leading figure of the Romanian exile.

In addition to his literary work, he is known for his independent left-wing views, which were influenced by libertarian socialism and anarchism. Țepeneag is one of the most important Romanian translators of French literature, and has rendered into Romanian the works by New Left, avant-garde and Neo-Marxist authors such as Alain Robbe-Grillet, Robert Pinget, Albert Béguin, Jacques Derrida, and Alexandre Kojève. The founder of the magazine Cahiers de l'Est, he has also translated texts by Romanian poets into French — examples include Leonid Dimov, Daniel Turcea, Ion Mureșan, Marta Petreu, Emil Brumaru, Mircea Ivănescu. His wife, Mona Țepeneag, is herself a translator and essayist.

== Biography ==
Born in Bucharest, Dumitru Țepeneag graduated from the Mihai Viteazul High School in the city, and then enrolled at the University of Bucharest Faculty of Law. He did not complete his studies and, instead, trained as a teacher at the Bucharest Pedagogical Institute, before dedicating himself to literature without ever professing.

In 1959, he met Leonid Dimov, a writer who shared his literary interests. Both took partial inspiration from Surrealism, but rejected its focus on psychoanalysis and the scientific ideas favored by André Breton. Țepeneag referred to this contrast by stating that "[w]e did not dream, we generated dreams."

In 1965-1966, Dumitru Țepeneag and Dimov reached out to a panel of young writers contributing to the Bucharest magazine Luceafărul — Vintilă Ivănceanu, Virgil Mazilescu, and Iulian Neacșu. Together, they established the literary trend called "Aesthetic Onirism", which, initially, also included Sânziana Pop. In time, they were joined by Emil Brumaru, Daniel Turcea, Sorin Titel, Florin Gabrea and Virgil Tănase.

The group was for a while under the protective wing of Romanian poet Miron Radu Paraschivescu, a Communist Party member who was generally seen as anti-dogmatic, and whose personal opinions were veering toward Trotskyism. According to Țepeneag, Paraschivescu, who was a former Surrealist, aimed at uniting avant-garde trends as a means to revitalize cultural life in Romania. This relationship allowed them to publish their works in his Povestea Vorbei, a supplement of the magazine Ramuri in Craiova. Țepeneag's work of the time was part of a Romanian intellectual reaction against Realism and Socialist realism, and coincided with the climate of liberalization at the end of Gheorghe Gheorghiu-Dej's period in power and the rise of Nicolae Ceaușescu. In particular, the period was marked by developments at Luceafărul: in 1968, the hardliner Eugen Barbu, who had attacked Țepeneag and other young authors, was replaced by the liberal Ștefan Bănulescu as editor-in-chief of the magazine. Literary critic Gabriel Dimisianu indicated that, at first, Romanian authorities tended to ignore the Oniric grouping, whom they viewed as "benign" and "a small racket caused by some people on the margin".

Dimisianu also noted that the Oniric movement was the only cultural movement of the time who had developed in complete separation from official guidelines. In this context, Țepeneag's contribution was compared to those of contemporaries such as Ioan Alexandru, Cezar Baltag, Ana Blandiana, Nicolae Breban, Nicolae Labiș, and Nichita Stănescu. At the time, Dumitru Țepeneag was influenced by various trends in experimental literature, including, alongside Surrealism, the Nouveau roman techniques first theorized during the 1950s.

Paraschivescu's project was halted late in 1966, when authorities shut down Povestea Vorbei. In reaction, Țepeneag and his fellow group members asked to be assigned their own magazine, as a literary supplement of Luceafărul, but their request was never granted. The "Aesthetic Onirism" group was able to print a few volumes between 1964 and 1972, but disbanded soon after the July Theses of 1971, when Ceaușescu imposed an even more severe system of censorship.

During the following years, both at home and abroad, Țepeneag began campaigning against totalitarianism in Romanian society, and especially the lack of freedom in the Romanian literary world. Alongside Ivănceanu and others, he spoke out against official policies during sessions of the Romanian Writers' Union, an official body reuniting literary figures. As Dimisianu noted, Țepeneag's protests were singular in that their tone was not just cultural, but overtly political. According to Țepeneag, a conflict erupted inside the literary establishment after the magazine Amfiteatru allowed him, Ivănceanu and Laurențiu Ulici to publish their grievances as part of a round table session which, although censored by the regime, prompted pro-communist and conformist writers to condemn the Oniric grouping. During trips to the United States and Western Europe, he met with other notable dissidents, and, in 1973, was interviewed by Radio Free Europe's Monica Lovinescu (an interview which denounced communist policies and was clandestinely broadcast inside his native country).

As a result, at the same time as other outspoken dissidents — novelist Paul Goma and poet Ileana Mălăncioiu among them —, he was marginalized inside the Writers' Union. Subsequently, placed under surveillance by the Romanian secret police, the Securitate, he was formally indicted in 1975.

The same year, while he was in France on temporary stay, Țepeneag's citizenship was stripped through a presidential decree signed by Ceaușescu. Inside Romania, Onirism became the target of cultural repression, and the term itself was carefully removed from all official publications. Țepeneag later commented that the regime had found "a scapegoat" in Onirism, and argued that the movement rapidly decayed from that moment on. Nonetheless, Dimisianu noted that the current remained a strong influence on the unofficial cultural scene, and that, in time, Onirism was adopted by younger writers such as Ioan Groșan.

After moving to Paris, Țepeneag continued writing first in Romanian — works which were usually translated into French by Alain Paruit — and later directly in French. With time, his style evolved to a more classical narrative. Together with Mihnea Berindei, Dumitru Țepeneag founded and coordinated the Committee for the Defense of Human Rights in Romania, which reported on nature of repression under Ceaușescu. A chess aficionado, he also published a book on Alekhine's Defence (La Défense Alekhine, 1983).

After the Romanian Revolution of 1989, he returned to Romania, where he was involved in handing out emergency humanitarian aid from the West. Ever since, he has commuted between Paris and Bucharest, and has played a part in promoting Romanian literature to the foreign public. His diaries from the early 1970s, detailing the years of his dissidence, were published in Romania beginning in 2006. Țepeneag has continued to publish in important Western magazines, and edited the Paris-based periodicals Cahiers de l'Est (later known as Nouveaux cahiers de l'Est), Poésie, and Seine et Danube, with support from the Romanian Cultural Institute.

== Political views and polemics ==
Opposing the Communist regime from the Left, Dumitru Țepeneag has maintained an independent and individualist position — literary critic Eugen Simion has defined him as "a heretic on the left", and his colleague Paul Cernat as "unclassifiable". In a 2003 interview with Ziua newspaper, he described himself as "an old anarchist". Elsewhere, the writer acknowledged that, during the 1960s and early 1970s, he viewed Ceaușescu's leadership as benign, and welcomed the distance the Communist Party took from the Soviet Union (especially in 1968, when Romania did not take part in the Warsaw Pact intervention against the Prague Spring in Czechoslovakia).

During his years of exile, he came into conflict with Romanian intellectuals such as Mircea Eliade and Ioan Cușa, whose opinions, Țepeneag argued, situated them among admirers of the fascist Iron Guard. He remained critical of Western society, especially after an article on Communist Romanian censorship he contributed to the French journal Le Monde turned out to have been modified by the editors. According to his translator Paruit, Țepeneag's leftist views may have contributed to his marginalization inside the Romanian exile, and may have even caused French authorities to view him with suspicion. Paruit noted that other writers, including Monica Lovinescu and Virgil Ierunca, both of whom reportedly refused to vouch for Țepeneag, "simply did not understand that it was possible to condemn communism from anarchist positions."

Such conflicts also surfaced after the writer returned to Romania — notably, Țepeneag clashed with novelist Augustin Buzura, whom he accused of mismanaging the state-sponsored promotion of Romanian literature abroad. The polemic was alluded to in Buzura's 2003 volume Tentația risipirii, where the author responded to criticism from Țepeneag, as well as to similar opinions expressed by Paul Goma, Gheorghe Grigurcu, and other writers. Commenting on this dispute, literary critic Mircea Iorgulescu argued that Buzura's book had classified Dumitru Țepeneag and his other adversaries as "insignificant authors", and expressed his opinion that such an attitude was incorrect.

In parallel, both Țepeneag and Buzura, alongside writers such as Eugen Simion, Fănuș Neagu, Valeriu Cristea and Marin Sorescu were the recipients of criticism from literary historian Alex Ștefănescu, in his book on 20th century Romanian literature. Ștefănescu alleged that all four authors had associated with Romania's first post-Revolution President, Ion Iliescu, and, to varying degrees, with Iliescu's Social Democratic Party. Of Țepeneag in particular, Alex Ștefănescu believed that he had lost his credibility for being part of "a group of writers well liked by Ion Iliescu". Responding to this, Simion argued that Ștefănescu was wrong to criticize authors based on "their political option".

Dumitru and Mona Țepeneag's familiarity with libertarian socialist and Neo-Marxist literature served as an influence for younger opponents of the Communist regime. Among them was the political scientist Vladimir Tismăneanu, who noted that he was first introduced to such works by the couple.

== Published works ==
=== First published in Romanian ===
==== Short stories ====
- Exerciții (Exercises) Bucharest, Editura pentru literatură, 1966
- Frig (Cold), Bucharest, Editura pentru literatură, 1967
- Așteptare (Waiting), Bucharest, Cartea Românească, 1971
- Înscenare și alte texte ("Staging" or "Frame-up" and other texts), Pitești, Editura Calende, 1992
- Prin gaura cheii (Through the keyhole), ed. Nicolae Bârna, Bucharest, Editura Allfa, 2001
- Proză scurtă (Short prose), Bucharest, Tracus Arte, 2014

==== Novels ====
- Hotel Europa, Bucharest, Editura Albatros, 1996
- Maramureș, Cluj, Editura Dacia, 2001
- La belle Roumaine, Pitești, Editura Paralela 45, 2004; Bucharest, Art, 2007
- Camionul bulgar. Șantier sub cerul liber (The Bulgarian Truck. Building Site beneath the Open Sky), Iași, Polirom, 2010.

==== Diaries ====
- Un român la Paris (A Romanian in Paris), Cluj, Editura Dacia, 1993; definitive edition, Bucharest, Cartea Românească, 2006

==== Essays and journalism ====
- Întoarcerea fiului la sânul mamei rătăcite (The son's return to the bosom of the errant mother), Iași, Institutul European, 1992
- Călătorie neizbutită (Unsuccessful journey), Bucharest, Cartea Românească, 1999
- Războiul literaturii nu s-a încheiat (The literature war is not yet over), Bucharest, Editura ALL, 2000
- Destin cu popești, Cluj, Editura Dacia & Biblioteca Apostrof, 2001
- Clepsidra răsturnată. Dialog cu Ion Simuț (Upturned hourglass. Dialogue with Ion Simuț)., Pitești, Paralela 45, 2003
- Capitalism de cumetrie (Nepotistic capitalism), Iași, Polirom, 2007

=== First published in French ===
- Arpièges, Paris, Flammarion, 1973 — translated by Alain Paruit after Zadarnică e arta fugii, first published in Romania by Editura Albatros in 1991; Bucharest, Art, 2007
- Les noces nécessaires, Paris, Flammarion, 1977, translated by Alain Paruit after Nunțile necesare (The Necessary Weddings), published in Romania in 1992 and 1999
- La défense Alekhine, Paris, Garnier, 1983
- Le mot sablier. Cuvântul nisiparniță (The Hourglass Word), Paris, Éditions P.O.L., 1984; Romanian-French bilingual edition: Cuvîntul nisiparniță, Bucharest, Editura Univers, 1994
- Roman de gare, written directly in French, 1985, translated into Romanian by the author as Roman de citit în tren, Iași, Institutul European, 1993
- Pigeon vole, written directly in French, 1988; translated into Romanian by the author as Porumbelul zboară, Bucharest, Editura Univers, 1997
- Pont des Arts, translated by Alain Paruit, Paris, Éditions P.O.L., 1998; Romanian version published by Editura Albatros, 1999
- Frappes chirurgicales, Paris, Éditions P.O.L., 2009

=== Translations ===
==== French ====
- Exercices d'attente, Flammarion, 1972, trans. Alain Paruit
- Au pays du Maramureș, trans. Alain Paruit, Paris, Éditions P.O.L., 2001
- Attente, trans. Alain Paruit, Paris, Éditions P.O.L., 2003
- Hôtel Europa, trans. Alain Paruit, Paris, Éditions P.O.L., 2006
- La belle Roumaine, trans. Alain Paruit, Paris, Éditions P.O.L., 2006
- Le camion bulgare, trans. Nicolas Cavaillès, Paris, Éditions P.O.L., 2011

==== English ====
- Vain Art of the Fugue, trans. Patrick Camiller, Dalkey Archive Press, 2007
- Pigeon Post, trans. Jane Kuntz, Dalkey Archive Press, 2008
- The Necessary Marriage, trans. Patrick Camiller, Dalkey Archive Press, 2009
- Hotel Europa, trans. Patrick Camiller, Dalkey Archive Press, 2010
- The Bulgarian Truck, trans. Alistair Ian Blyth, Dalkey Archive Press, 2015
- La Belle Roumaine, trans. Alistair Ian Blyth, Dalkey Archive Press, 2015
