= Olari Church =

Orthodox church in Bucharest, Romania

Coordinates: 44°26′20″N 26°06′56″E

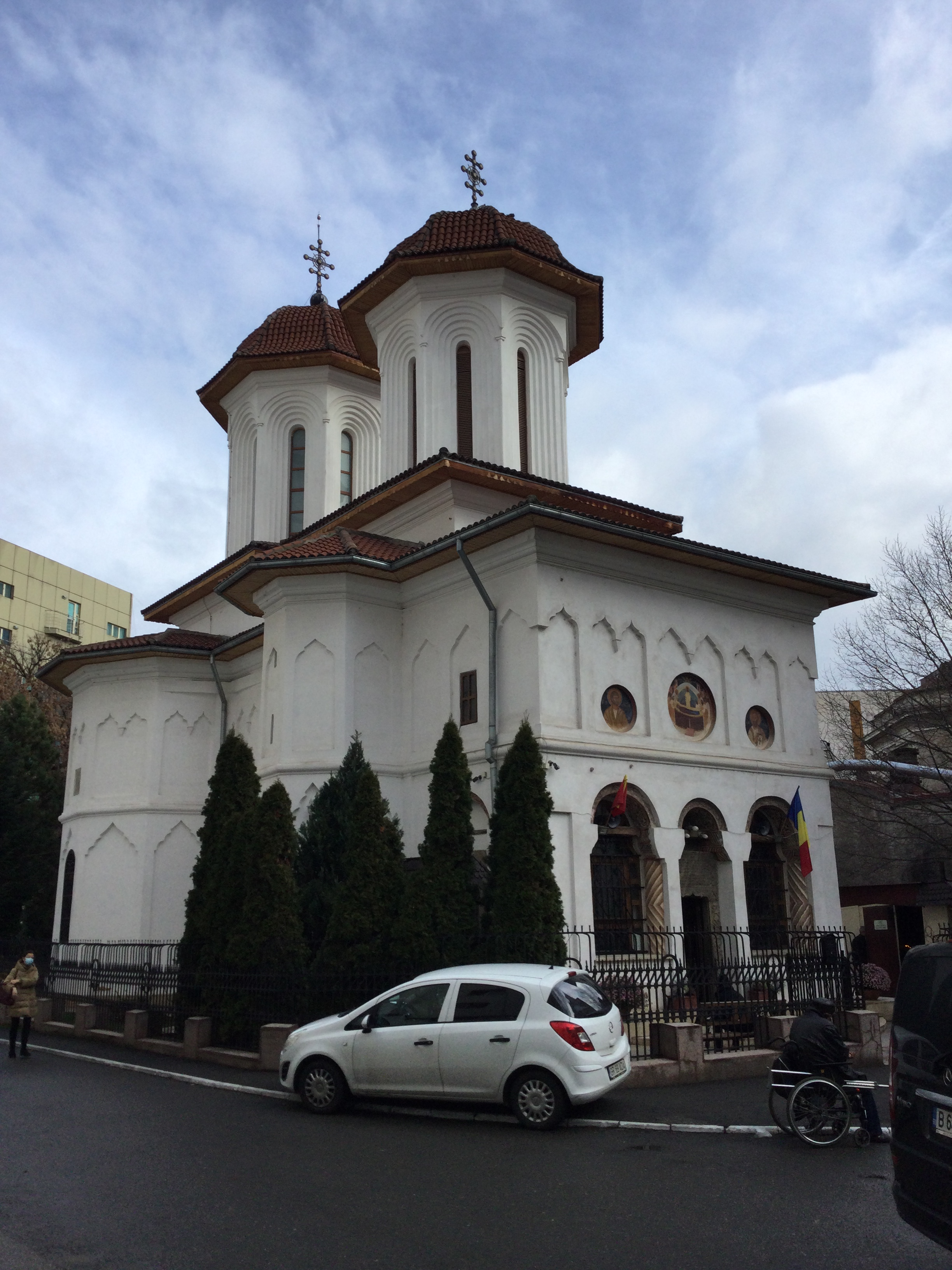
Olari Church

The Olari Church (Romanian: Biserica Olari) is a Romanian Orthodox church located at 6 Olari Street in Bucharest, Romania. It is dedicated to the Dormition of the Mother of God.

The church is named after the surrounding district, a place where potters (olari) dug for clay, according to a 1752 document. A church, probably of wood, stood nearby in the first half of the 18th century. According to the pisanie, located above the entrance door and written in Romanian Cyrillic, the church was built in 1758. An 1847 plan notes that it was also called Ceauș (doorman) Precup. The church was originally surrounded by walls and cells, which also hosted a school; all these structures were demolished in the late 19th century. In 1836, the church was repaired and modified: the portico was closed, with another small one on two columns added, and the interior was repainted in oil. The tin-coated wooden domes were rebuilt in 1863. An 1869 repainting followed the style of Gheorghe Tattarescu, with a series of framed works.

A professional restoration of 1939–1943 replaced the tin with tiles and remade the domes of masonry, like in the original structure; the added plaster was removed, bringing to light the initial form of the portico, with painted columns and arches; the second portico was removed. In 1982–1983, during the systematization of Calea Moșilor ordered by the Nicolae Ceaușescu regime, the church was moved 58 meters, ending up behind a row of apartment blocks. It was re-sanctified and reopened in 1984. The painting was restored in 1994–2002, bringing to light a previously hidden depiction of Abraham.

The three-lobed church measures 23 meters long by 6.5 to 13 meters wide, with two octagonal domes on square bases. The portico, with three semicircular arches resting on masonry columns, is enclosed by windows and metal grilles. The columns and archivolts are painted with red, black and brown floral motifs. A simple string course divides the facade into two nearly equal parts. These are decorated with arched recesses, in pairs above, single and larger below. On the entrance facade, above the arches and among the frames, there are three medallions from 1943. These are painted in fresco with the patron feast in the center, flanked by Saints Peter and Paul. A small flower garden surrounds the church.

The north apse features an icon of the Virgin Mary; ascribed by some with wonder-working abilities, it is surrounded by 24 depictions of reported miracles. It was brought around 1810 by monks fleeing persecution in Turkey; in 1864, the gilt silver coating was removed and placed on another icon before the royal doors, while a new covering was created for the original. The church is listed as a historic monument by Romania's Ministry of Culture and Religious Affairs.
