= Anatol E. Baconsky =

Romanian modernist poet, essayist, translator, novelist, publisher and critic

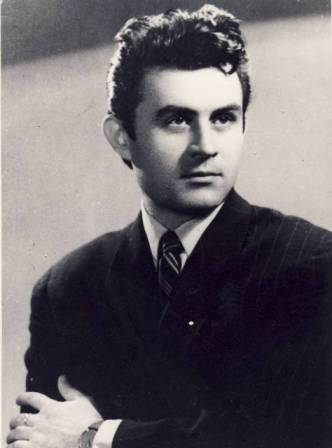
- Born: June 16, 1925; Cofa, Hotin County, Kingdom of Romania
- Died: March 4, 1977 (aged 51); Bucharest, Socialist Republic of Romania
- Education: Babeș-Bolyai University
- Occupations: poet, translator, journalist, essayist, literary critic, art critic, short story writer, novelist, publisher
- Writing career
- Period: 1942–1977
- Genres: dystopia, lyric poetry, free verse, sonnet, reportage, travel writing, satire
- Movements: Surrealism, Socialist realism, Modernism

Anatol E. Baconsky (Romanian pronunciation: [anaˈtol baˈkonski]; June 16, 1925 – March 4, 1977), also known as A. E. Bakonsky, Baconschi or Baconski, was a Romanian modernist poet, essayist, translator, novelist, publisher, literary and art critic. Praised for his late approach to poetry and prose, which transgresses the genres and introduces an aestheticized, original and progressively dark perspective to Romanian literature, he was also criticized for his early commitment to Socialist Realism and communism. Much of his work belongs to the field of travel literature, recording his experiences in the Eastern Bloc, the Far East and Soviet Union, and finally Central Europe. He was also a critically acclaimed translator of foreign works, including the Mahābhārata and poems by Jorge Semprún, Artur Lundkvist and others, the author of world literature anthologies, and the editor of monographs on Romanian and foreign painters.

After a brief affiliation to Surrealism in the 1940s, Baconsky was a prominent supporter of the communist regime who joined its cultural establishment. In the mid-1950s, he grew disillusioned with communist guidelines—this attitude was notably manifested in his activity as editor of the Cluj-based magazine Steaua (where he reacted against the prevailing censorship), his 1972 public reaction against the norms imposed by the Nicolae Ceaușescu regime, and his samizdat novel Biserica neagră ("The Black Church"). Having spent much of final years in Austria and West Berlin, where he became a critic of consumerism, Baconsky died in Bucharest, a victim of the 1977 earthquake.

Anatol E. Baconsky was the elder brother of Leon Baconsky, a literary historian and academic, and the father of writer and diplomat Teodor Baconschi.

== Biography ==
=== Early life ===
Born in Cofa village, northern Bessarabia (presently Konovka, Ukraine), he was the eldest son of Eftimie Baconsky, a Romanian Orthodox priest, whose name he used as his patronymic middle name (usually marked by the initial). His brother Leon was born in 1928, around the time when the Baconsky family was spending long intervals in Drepcăuți, a locality on the Prut River shore. In 1936–1944, he was in Chișinău, where he attended the Alecu Russo Gymnasium and High School, publishing his first poems in the school magazine Mugurel during 1942. After the Soviet Union occupied Bessarabia in 1940, Romania joined the Axis powers in the war against the Soviet Union, and Bessarabia became part of the Eastern Front, before the 1944 Romanian coup d'état and the start of Soviet occupation brought Nazi German influence to an end (see Romania during World War II). The Baconskys left the region, and Anatol attended the Lahovary High School in Râmnicu Vâlcea (1944–1945). Eventually, the family settled in Ciomăgești, Argeș County, while Anatol took his baccalaureate (June 1945) and briefly worked at a factory in the Transylvanian town of Cisnădie.

In November 1945, Baconsky moved to Cluj. He began his studies at the University of Cluj's Faculty of Law, while attending lectures in Philosophy and Aesthetics given by Lucian Blaga and Eugeniu Sperantia. His first essay, which Baconsky considered his actual debut work, was published by the Tribuna Nouă newspaper. Beginning 1946, his work was given more exposure, and was published in local Transylvanian journals (such as the Carei-based Prietenii Artei) before being featured in the collective volume Antologia primăverii ("The Anthology of Spring"). He was at the time an adherent to Surrealism, and a volume of his Surrealist poetry was supposed to be edited by Editura Fundaţiilor Regale, but never saw print, owing to the institution's disestablishment by the new communist authorities. Literary historian Mircea Braga writes that, over the following years, Baconsky showed himself to be a staunch critic of Surrealism, and quotes him defining André Breton's pupils as followers of a "rigid dogma". Literary critic and academic Diana Câmpan also that the split with Surrealism and the avant-garde was a sign of his belief that negation could only result in value if substantiated, as well as his theory that aesthetic revolt, after manifesting itself as a disease, was degenerating into kitsch.

Discarding Surrealism soon after, Baconsky moved to a poetic version of Socialist Realism, partly influenced by the Soviet Proletkult tradition (see Socialist realism in Romania). In 1949, the year of his graduation, Baconsky was a regional delegate to the Writers' Congress in Bucharest, a conference which led to the creation of the Romanian Writers' Union (USR). Also in 1949, he joined the writing staff of the Lupta Ardealului journal, and married Clara Popa, a student at the University of Cluj's Faculty of Letters. In October, his poetry was published in a bilingual almanac co-edited by Romanian and Hungarian writers (it was titled Împreună in Romanian and Együtt in Hungarian, both words meaning "Together").

=== Early years at Steaua ===
In 1950, Baconsky completed his first volume, Poezii ("Poems", published by the USR's Editura de stat pentru literatură şi artă). The following year, he printed another book of poetry, Copiii din Valea Arieșului ("The Children of the Arieș Valley"). The new editor was by then involved in a number of disputes with other young authors, in particular those grouped around the Sibiu Literary Circle, among them Ștefan Augustin Doinaș and Nicolae Balotă.

It was at that stage that he began collaborating with Almanahul Literar, a newly founded magazine edited by communist poet Miron Radu Paraschivescu, which, in 1954, was renamed Steaua. Among his early assignments there was his participation on the literary jury that granted the magazine's annual prize (alongside literary men such as Paraschivescu, Emil Isac, Dumitru Micu, and Iosif Pervain). In one notable incident of 1950, the panel honored a high school student named Ion Motoarcă, without being aware that Motoarcă's communist poetry was in fact a parody of Socialist Realist literature, authored as a prank by Baconsky's rival Doinaș. As was revealed decades later, Doinaș continued to ridicule the Steaua writers over several months, and, when he decided that the risk of repercussions was far too great, simply put an end to the prank. This he did by having Motoarcă decline all of Baconsky's suggestions with the claim that one "should not take lessons from a less gifted poet than himself." In parallel, Anatol E. Baconsky's relationship with Paraschivescu was tense: in February 1951, at a USR meeting in Bucharest, he was one of those who criticized Baconsky's new take on lyric poetry, accusing him of "intimism".

However, in 1952, Paraschivescu left for Braşov, and Baconsky took over as editor of Steaua, progressively changing its profile and shaping it into a literary and art magazine. Fellow poet and essayist Matei Călinescu, who was acquainted with Baconsky and later joined the Steaua group, believes his older colleague had been "rewarded" the position by the ruling Romanian Communist Party. In parallel, he established contacts with young authors in Bucharest, who became Steaua's circle in the capital: Călinescu, Cezar Baltag, Gabriel Dimisianu, Grigore Hagiu, Mircea Ivănescu, Modest Morariu, Nichita Stănescu and Petre Stoica.

Baconsky also published poems in Viaţa Românească magazine, including the 1951 Noapte în flăcări ("Night Ablaze"). In 1952, he was working on translating Stepan Schipachov's poem about Pavlik Morozov, a Soviet boy who had denounced his family for opposing Soviet collectivization, and, after being killed by them, had been celebrated as a communist hero. He was in the process of publishing a series of reportages about the lives of Romanian workers, and, in 1952, stated that he intended to write poetry about life in the factories at Brad, which he had visited. Some of his poems were published in the 1952 volume Poezie nouă în R.P.R. ("New Poetry in the P[eople's] R[epublic of] R[omania]"), together with those of Maria Banuş, Dan Deşliu, Mihu Dragomir, Eugen Frunză, Ştefan Iureş, Eugen Jebeleanu, Veronica Porumbacu, Alexandru Toma and twenty-four others.

=== From Itinerar bulgar to Fluxul memoriei ===
In January 1953, the 26-year-old poet left Romania on his first trip abroad, visiting the People's Republic of Bulgaria. Back in Bucharest during March, he was present at a USR meeting indirectly provoked by the death of Soviet leader Joseph Stalin, during which they were confronted with the new cultural guidelines stated by Georgy Malenkov. A condemnation of the first- and second-generation proletkult writers, it saw Baconsky both as a critic and a target of criticism. His volume of reportage from the Bulgarian travel, Itinerar bulgar ("Bulgarian Itinerary"), saw print in 1954, together with the poetry collection Cîntece de zi şi noapte ("Songs of Day and Night", awarded the State Prize in 1955).

In 1998, literary critic Cornel Ungureanu proposed that, by that moment, Baconsky was finding his voice as a "rebellious author". According to Călinescu, the Baconsky of the late 1950s had "completely changed his orientation". Writing for Steaua in 1955, Baconsky submitted an essay reviewing and promoting the work of George Bacovia, a Symbolist and pessimist who had been largely ignored by post-1948 critics (see Symbolist movement in Romania).

Baconsky was again a USR delegate in June 1956, when he presented the body with the first of his reports, dealing with the state of Romanian poetry. This congress, literary critic Paul Cernat notes, coincided with a period when writers sought a "regeneration", to correspond with the relaxation brought by the death of Stalin. Also that year, he published his Două poeme ("Two Poems") book, comprising Cîntecul verii acesteia ("This Summer's Song") and Lucrări şi anotimpuri sau Mişcarea de revoluţie ("Labors and Seasons or The Orbital Revolution"). In autumn, he left for the Soviet Union and the Far East, visiting North Korea, the People's Republic of China, and Siberian areas.

Beginning summer 1956, the communist regime clamped down on the cultural environment, its apprehension motivated by events in Communist Poland, the scene of anti-communist workers' protests, and Communist Hungary, where an anti-Soviet revolt eventually broke out. According to historian Vladimir Tismăneanu, Baconsky was one of the writers informed of the decision taken by communist leader Gheorghe Gheorghiu-Dej not to endorse liberalization and destalinization, particularly after the events in Hungary threatened to disrupt communism throughout the Eastern Bloc, and at a time when the regime condemned advocates of change (Miron Constantinescu, Mihail Davidoglu, Alexandru Jar and Ion Vitner).

Anatol E. Baconsky was again present in poetry with the 1957 volume Dincolo de iarnă ("Beyond Winter"). According to Braga, it was the moment in which his poetry made decisive gains in originality, and the first stage in his renunciation of "Proletkult versification". It was followed by a collection of critical essays, Colocviu critic ("Critical Colloquy"). In October–November, Baconsky was again a traveler to the Soviet Union, reaching Moscow, Leningrad and the Baltic, and the northern Black Sea shore. Late in the year, he issued Fluxul memoriei ("The Flow of Memory"), seen by Braga as "essential in the development of his poetry."

=== Move to Bucharest and debut in publishing ===
By 1958, Baconsky became a target of criticism in the literary community. The reaction, Braga noted, was "vehement", and, in January 1959, got Baconsky dismissed from his position as editor of Steaua. In October of that year, the poet left Cluj and settled in Bucharest. According to Ungureanu, the capital was "hostile" to Baconsky, and the move was the equivalent of an "exile".

Over the following decade, he focused mainly on reading his earlier volumes of poetry, on publishing works of criticism and travel writing, and on translating works by various authors. His new home became a gathering spot for young writers who did not approve of communism's cultural guidelines, including Călinescu and other Bucharesters who had previously published their work in Steaua.

In 1960, Baconsky published his translation of early Korean poetry (Poeţi clasici coreeni) and the reportage volume Călătorii în Europa şi Asia ("Travels in Europe and Asia"), comprising both new works and a reprint of Itinerar bulgar. The following year, he reprinted some of his poems under the title Versuri ("Verses"), and authored a similarly titled translation from the Italian modernist Salvatore Quasimodo (reprinted 1968). These were followed in 1962 by his translation of The Long Voyage, a novel by Spanish author Jorge Semprún (published in Romania under the title Marea călătorie), and the cycle Meridiane ("Meridians"), comprising essays on 20th century literature, and published over three years by the magazine Contemporanul. Also in 1962, Baconsky published the poetry volume Imn către zorii de zi ("A Hymn to Daybreak"), and presented a second Writers' Union report (Situaţia poeziei universale contemporane, "The State of Contemporary Universal Poetry"). He also left on an extended tour of Moldavia and Northern Dobruja, spending much time in the Danube Delta.

A year later, he published a translation of selected poems by Swedish author Artur Lundkvist, an anthology of his own translations from foreign writers (titled Poeţi şi poezie—"Poetry and Poets"—and featuring Baconsky's short essays as introductions for each of the authors). His work of the time also comprises the guide book Cluj şi împrejurimile sale. Mic îndreptar turistic ("Cluj and Its Surroundings. A Concise Tourist Guide"). In 1964, having published a new collected volume of his poetry, Baconsky also completed a translation of Mahābhārata, an ancient Indian epic. Illustrated by Marcela Cordescu in its original print, it carried the subtitle Arderea zmeilor ("Burning of the Zmei"). His new poetry volume, Fiul risipitor (Romanian for "The Prodigal Son"), saw print in 1965.

=== Early Ceauşescu years ===
Baconsky's situation improved during Gheorghe Gheorghiu-Dej's final years in power, and particularly after Nicolae Ceauşescu's arrival at the head of the Communist Party inaugurated a period of liberalization. The poet was elected to the Writers' Union Leadership Committee in February 1965. The same month, in this official capacity, he was allowed to travel outside the Iron Curtain and into Western Europe: he was in Austria, invited by the Österreichische Gesellschaft für Literatur, and also visited France and Italy. Upon his return in April, he passed through Yugoslavia, being welcomed by the Union of Yugoslav Writers. Owing to his new contacts abroad, Baconsky began publishing his work in international reviews, among them France's Cahiers de L'Herne; Austria's Literatur und Kritik and Die Presse; and West Germany's Die Welt, Akzente and Das Ensemble. Following his return, Baconsky published his essay volume Meridiane and a selection of poems translated from the American Carl Sandburg. His own lyrics were published in a Hungarian translation, authored by poet Sándor Kányádi. In 1966, Die Welt published the report Baconsky sent to writers participating in the International Congress held in Austria.

In 1967, the writer completed work on his collection of old poetry and new pieces, also titled Fluxul memoriei ("The Flow of Memory"), and published his debut short story volume, Echinoxul nebunilor şi alte povestiri ("The Madmen's Equinox and Other Stories"). He revisited Italy and Austria, and, in 1968, traveled to West Germany. In his 1968 two-volume book Remember (title in the original), he republished his earlier travel writings into the East with modifications, and added an account of his western travels, headlined Fals jurnal de călătorie ("False Travel Journal"). He also hosted a weekly National Radio program, titled Meridiane lirice ("Lyrical Meridians")—Baconsky read his introductions to works by various writers, and Romanian theater stars read fragments of their work.

In November, Anatol E. Baconsky was reelected to the Writers' Union Committee, and, in 1969, his Remember was awarded Steaua's annual prize. He visited the Hungarian capital Budapest, invited by the local branch of the International PEN. Late in 1969, he published the poetry volume Cadavre în vid ("Thermoformed Dead Bodies"), which was granted the 1970 Award by the Writers' Union. Also in 1970, his Echinoxul nebunilor was translated into German by Austrian author Max Demeter Peyfuss, being released in Austria, West Germany and Switzerland. The Romanian writer attended the event in Vienna, before leaving for Paris. The following year, he traveled to West Germany and again to Austria. Over the following three years, these visits were depicted by Baconsky in his permanent column at the journal Magazin. He also published his first volume on the art of Romania—a monograph dedicated to and named after painter Dimitrie Ghiaţă.

=== Final years ===
By 1971, Baconsky was outraged by the Ceauşescu regime having curbed ideological relaxation and proclaimed a Romanian "cultural revolution" (see July Theses). The following year, invited to a meeting with the new President, he joined sculptor George Apostu in publicly questioning the new guidelines.

In February 1972, he settled in West Berlin, after the Academy of Sciences and Humanities offered to host him for one year. He traveled outside the city: invited to Scandinavia by the Swedish Institute, he visited Denmark and Sweden (crossing the Arctic Circle during one trip); he also attended the International Writers' Congress in Austria, and made additional visits to Belgium and the Netherlands. His volume on the art of Ion Ţuculescu was published at home during that time.

His 1973 anthology of world poetry, Panorama poeziei universale ("The Panorama of Universal Poetry"), was noted by Hungarian literary historian János Kohn among similar Romanian works of the period (including Ion Caraion's collection of American poetry), as an important step in the history of Romanian translations. The book, based on the Meridiane lirice program, comprised works by 99 authors, from Endre Ady to William Butler Yeats. Cernat calls the volume "fundamental". All translations were done by Baconsky himself, whose effort was rewarded by the Writers' Union with its 1973 prize.

Together with other poets, he traveled again to Budapest, as part of a cultural exchange between Hungary and Romania, and, in 1974, was again on leave in Italy (invited by academics in the fields of philology and Romanic languages), Austria, and ultimately West Berlin (where the academy organized a gala in his honor). In 1975, he printed his last anthumous work, an album-monograph dedicated to Quattrocento painter Sandro Botticelli (published by Editura Meridiane). He had completed work on his only novel, Biserica neagră, whose anti-communist undertones meant that it could not be published at home. Instead, the text circulated in samizdat form, and was made into a series by the Munich-based Radio Free Europe, which broadcast clandestinely inside Romania.

In March 1977, Baconsky and his wife Clara fell victims to the 7.2 Mw Vrancea earthquake which devastated Bucharest. At the time, Baconsky was preparing for a new trip abroad: complying with Communist Romania's restrictions on the use of passports, he had just asked authorities to release the document, and was carrying it on his person. His last volumes, Biserica neagră and Corabia lui Sebastian ("Sebastian's Ship"), remained unpublished.

== Work, style and creative periods ==
=== Communism and Socialist Realism ===
After his short affiliation to Surrealism, a style which is almost entirely absent from his published work, Baconsky embraced a style which reflected his communist sympathies, and which is most often seen as the source of some of his poorest work. Cornel Ungureanu describes the early 1950s Baconsky as "an exponent of socialist realism" and a "passionate supporter of the communist utopia"; his stance in respect to the authorities was described by literary historian Alex Drace-Francis as "conformist" (a word also used by Călinescu), while Paul Cernat circumscribes Baconsky to the "pure and tough Stalinism" of the day.

His early works are seen by literary critic Sorin Tomuța as "an unfortunate debut with conjectural lyrics". Likened by Matei Călinescu to the debut writings of the younger communist author Dan Deşliu, they became the topic of criticism from as early as the Nicolae Ceaușescu years: Mircea Braga called them "platitudes" and "at most, documents for a certain mindset and 'artistic' practice", noting that their own author had come to reject them in later years. He also cites fellow critic Alexandru Piru, who defines Baconsky's early productions as bearing "the strong imprint of journalism".

This series included controversial stanzas about communization, the Romanian collectivization process, and class struggle against wealthy peasants known as chiaburi (Romanian for kulaks). Other portions of his work were dedicated to industrialization policies, around subjects related to Brad factories. Discussing his projects for 1952 in an interview with Contemporanul, Baconsky explained: "I am especially interested in the matter of engineers who rose from the ranks of young workers. I want to follow [their] transformation on all levels and create the figure of a young engineer in one of my poems." One of his best-known poems of the period has to do with the chiaburi, and includes the lines:

Trece-o noapte şi mai trece-o zi,
Se ascute lupta între clase,
Iar chiaburii se arat-a a fi
Elemente tot mai duşmănoase.

Translation:

A night passes, another day passes,
The fight between classes is enhanced,
And the chiaburi have shown themselves to be
More and more vicious elements.

Other such lyrics read:

Astea le vedem noi — dar chiaburii
Văd în faţă negre văgăuni
Şi în ochii lor văpaia urii
Răscoleşte blestemaţii tăciuni.

Translation:

These are what we see—but the chiaburi
See in front on them black precipices
And in their eyes the glow of hatred
Is stirring the cursed embers.

Former Romanian Communist Party activist Pavel Țugui, whose opinions diverged from the party line, claimed that, in effect, Baconsky was writing with subversive undertones from the time of his debut—literary chronicler Bogdan Creţu renders this opinion, but expresses doubt, calling Țugui "dubious" and "in reality, a politruk as sinister as all the others." Literary historian Eugen Simion also proposed that Baconsky was, in effect, parodying agitprop literature of the day. Analyzing Baconsky's early political views, his biographer Crina Bud concludes that the poet was attracted into cooperation in order to make a living, and that, from the very start, he was playing a number of different and conflicting "roles".

The writer was already noted for being a man of refined tastes and for being interested by universal culture. Both Creţu and Cernat define him as "a dandy of communism". The "dandy" trait had also been noted by Eugen Simion. Simion, who recorded his impression of Baconsky, spoke of his "romantic beauty", "sartorial elegance", and a form of "melancholy" which, he argued, recalled that displayed by 19th century author Gérard de Nerval. Historian Vladimir Tismăneanu sees Anatol E. Baconsky as one of the few genuine left-wing intellectuals who remained associated with the regime throughout the 1950s (in his definition, the group also comprised Geo Bogza, Ovid Crohmălniceanu, Geo Dumitrescu, Petru Dumitriu, Paul Georgescu, Gheorghe Haupt, Eugen Jebeleanu, Mihail Petroveanu and Nicolae Tertulian).

During his period at Steaua, Baconsky encouraged young authors to express themselves and created, what both Tomuţa and Creţu define as a "literary oasis". Tismăneanu however criticizes the writer and other leftists on the cultural scene for not reacting against the post-1956 repressive mood, and argues that their inaction helped ideologists Leonte Răutu and his subordinate Mihai Beniuc to restore Gheorghe Gheorghiu-Dej's control over the Writers' Union.

A particular controversy involves allegations against the young Baconsky for the way in which he treated his colleagues. Many voices in the literary community have come to suspect that he was an informant for the Securitate secret police, and that his reports helped in the arrest of other writers. Crina Bud proposes that, if such accounts are true, Baconsky may have used the Securitate in order to silence those who competed with him for the approval of his teacher, philosopher Lucian Blaga. The accusations are traced by Cernat to two separate sources: Baconsky's adversaries in the Sibiu Literary Circle and Securitate general Nicolae Pleşiţă. During his early activities in Cluj, Baconsky is also alleged to have partaken in the marginalization of a less enthusiastic writer, Ion Dezideriu Sîrbu, who was later to become a political prisoner (in Sîrbu's memoirs, Baconsky is singled out as one of those who betrayed his confidence).

=== Break with communism ===
Despite initially complying with ideological requirements, Baconsky was often subject to criticism in the official press. This occurred frequently after 1953, when Soviet politico Georgy Malenkov disavowed proletkult, criticizing its exponents for having authored a bland and distant form of literature (an accusation which Baconsky was regularly faced with from that moment on). Criticism was expressed early on by poet Veronica Porumbacu, who reproached him having published too little "when the people is asking us to participate with all forces in the struggle." Also in 1953, Paul Georgescu, literary columnist at Scînteia, the main Communist Party organ, reacted against the Steaua leadership, and argued that Baconsky personally had developed "a high-flown style, designed to hide his unfamiliarity with life and lack of ideas." Georgescu also claimed that Baconsky's travel accounts had failed to show "how [Bulgarian] people live, how this country looks today [...]", and that his poems displayed various ideological mistakes. Writing for Viaţa Românească, critic Eugen Campus endorsed earlier pronouncements and added that, although Baconsky was a "talented poet", he found his contributions showed "a tendency to repeat oneself—for all the originality it covets". Literary historian Ana Selejan notes that, upon the end of the debates, the poet found himself was "blacklisted" by the official critics.

In parallel, Baconsky criticized other writers on similar grounds. He aimed such remarks at his fellow poet Eugen Frunză, which brought him additional criticism from Georgescu and Mircea Gafiţa. Several of Baconsky's poems, in particular the 1953 Rutină ("Routine"), satirize authors who did not seek to make their poems interesting to the general public. The latter, Selejan proposes, may be a covert reference to and ironic pastiche of Mihai Beniuc, one of the Socialist Realist poets most trusted by the regime. One of the stanzas reads:

Dimineaţă. Lumea-n drum spre muncă
Te-a citit ivit pe undeva,
Nimeni nu te cheltuie, te-aruncă,
Putrezit de viu în lumea ta.

Translation:

Morning. People on their way to work
Have read you as you crept up somewhere,
Nobody employs you, they throw you away,
Rotting alive as you are in your world.

Selejan also notes that Rutină, like the war poem Manifest ("Manifesto"), constitute a "dissonant note" when compared with other poems of the day, including those of Beniuc. Manifest, which may have been written in honor of the Romanian-hosted World Festival of Youth and Students (1953), and which Selejan believes may display irony toward "poetic militantism in the present tense", compares the fate of World War II soldiers with that of post-1945 youth, in meditative lyrics such as:

Dragi prieteni nu vă amăgesc,
Nu vă spun că morţii din războaie
Trec în stele ca-ntr-un basm ceresc
Şi privesc cu ochii la văpaie.

Translation:

Dear friends I will not deceive you,
I won't tell you that the casualties of war
Pass towards the stars like in some heavenly tale
And rest their eyes upon the flame.

Progressively after the late 1950s, Baconsky entirely lost his confidence in communism—an attitude which culminated in his 1972 protest. His disappointment was especially known to his intimate circle. Based on this, Cernat defines the writer as an "informal anti-communist", while Călinescu, who recalls participating in such conversations, notes: "Baconsky [displayed] an emphatic, lucid, irreconcilable anti-communism. Not even later [...] did I meet many people who had a more emphasized contempt, mixed with an intense repulsion, for the representatives of the [communist] party ideology, either within the literary world or outside it." He believes Baconsky's stance from 1958 onwards makes him the period's "only dissident", although he also notes that the poet criticized the communist system only "orally". Cornel Ungureanu, who stresses the importance of both his move to Bucharest and the numerous visits abroad, adds: "[he] was to walk down a road which most celebrity authors of the 1950s' communist east [...] have walked down on: the one between fanatical exaltation and acute misanthropies." According to Bogdan Creţu, 1967, when Echinoxul nebunilor was published, was the capital moment in Baconsky's non-compliance with the ideological requirements, with "more than honorable behavior" defining the second part of his career. However, Cernat speculates, the theory regarding his alleged collaboration to Securitate may offer clue that Baconsky's new stance was itself orchestrated by the Party, in an attempt to offer him credibility and permit him to sabotage the literary environment.

Baconsky allowed his intellectual opposition to communism to merge with his activities as a cultural promoter. In addition to promoting the work of George Bacovia, Baconsky had sought to republish the works of Mateiu Caragiale and his Decadent novel Craii de Curtea-Veche, but his efforts had been frustrated, and (according to Eugen Simion, their only effect was that Scînteia resumed its earlier campaign against Caragiale). In the climate of relative liberalization coinciding with Nicolae Ceauşescu's early years in office, his anthologies and essays helped reinstate works of literature who had been previously censored. Ungureanu thus notes that Baconsky reintroduced the Romanian public to works of Central European authors, such as Franz Kafka and Ingeborg Bachmann, and argues: "He is the first one (or among the first ones) to 'reconquer' the Mitteleuropean space for Romanian culture." Cernat portrays him as a "European humanist with a vast and refined culture", while Creţu proposes that Baconsky and his generation colleague Ştefan Augustin Doinaş may be Romania's "best translators of poetry". By 1970, Baconsky's younger colleague Gabriel Dimisianu notes, he had become one of the "writers and literary critics who had initially paid a toll to proletkultism, and now were silently parting with it, returning to literature, to actual criticism". This group, defined by Dimisianu as "the older allies of my generation", also includes Paraschivescu, Geo Bogza, Ovid Crohmălniceanu, Geo Dumitrescu, Eugen Jebeleanu, Marin Preda, Zaharia Stancu, as well as Baconsky's former rival Paul Georgescu.

=== Lyrical transition ===
Following his break with the regime, Baconsky's style underwent major changes. Tomuţa notes he became "a first-rate stylist", while Doinaş stresses his "discreet but tenacious self-edification", leading to "an ardent consciousness, albeit perhaps belatedly gained". The new direction, heralded during his time at Steaua, was however much-criticized by the 1950s cultural establishment, who accused him of "intimism" and excessive "lyricism", and argued that his work was a return to aestheticism and Symbolism. Baconsky resisted such criticism, and, in one of his articles, openly stated that poets needed to return to a lyrical approach: "Ignoring the rich array of intimate feelings means mutilating the protagonist's personality, depicting him unilaterally, belittling the actual dimensions of his soul." Matei Călinescu argues that such a commitment to artistic purity was a sign of "what we could call the 'aesthetic resistance' to communism."

According to Badea, such experiments resulted in Baconsky's originality, "an anti-metaphoric offensive, built upon the confrontation between the life of lyrical characters with the destiny of ideal lives". The rejection of "decorative metaphors", Cernat notes, was a staple of Baconsky's work, and was explicitly stated in his post-1969 essays. Badea added that this Dincolo de iarnă, and the volumes which followed down to 1965, formed "the first page in a distinct chapter of our modern lyric poetry." Eugen Simion emphasized as the common trait of such poems: "a voluptuousness in things fading away, in the weariness provoked by the whispers of rain." In his definition, Baconsky had become "an aesthete of melancholy."

Baconsky's poems of the period speak of himself being "torn" by the contradictions of destiny, submitted to the command of a nature whose geography, Braga notes, is "dead", seeking to undermine his own humanity so as to become the ideal creator. Also according to Mircea Braga, "the manifesto of [Baconsky's] onthologic unease" is his Imn către nelinişte ("Hymn to Disquiet"):

Astfel, întotdeauna să-mi fie dor de ceva,
Să aştept, să caut, să am frământări,
Să regret rătăcirile singure — volutele lor
Asemenea şerpilor să se-ntoarcă mereu după mine [...]

Translation:

Thus, may I always be missing something,
Waiting, searching, having unrests,
Regretting the lonesome wanderings—their volutes
Always turning after me, as if snakes [...]

It was also at this stage that the poet began introducing references to remote or exotic locations in his works. His poems began to speak of mysterious Baltic and Northern European landscapes, of ancient roads, medieval settings and the desolation of history, as well as of Romania's natural sights (the Danube Delta and the Carpathian Mountains) and scenes from Romanian history (involving the Dacians, the Scythes and the Thracians, or the Moldavian Prince Stephen the Great). The pieces show his enduring fascination with water environments, references to which, according to Braga, he used to illustrate the "all-encompassing dynamic."

=== Cadavre în vid and Corabia lui Sebastian ===
With the somber collection Cadavre în vid, Baconsky entered what Braga calls a "forth artistic phase" (after Surrealism, Socialist Realism and the first change in orientation). Braga however insists that the change between the final two phases is not radical, and that they are separated by a break rather than a tear. Braga also believes that, in his depictions of melancholy and disease, Baconsky again focuses on unease and "the denial of the irreplaceable" (while letting the reader know that such a denial is "useless and inefficient"). In a 1985 essay, poet and critic Dinu Flămând discusses Cadavre în vid as "a book of suffering, unique in our literature, a tragic perception of the disinherited, a nightmare of teratologic dreams in the new 'electronic season' ". It includes Sonet negru ("Black Sonnet"), which Braga calls an "exceptional" sample of "feverish tensions, infinite searches [...], obscure impulses":

Singur rămas visezi printre făclii
cai negri, câmpuri moarte, umbre vii,
şi nu mai eşti în stare să le numeri.

Şi capete tăiate-odinioară
se-ntorc de undeva ca o povară
ce-ţi va fi dat s-o porţi mereu pe umeri.

Translation:

Left alone, you dream among the torches
of black horses, dead fields, living shadows,
and are no longer able to keep count of them.

And heads chopped off in olden days
return from some place as a burden
that you shall always have to carry on your shoulders.

Mircea Braga writes that this and other late volumes, showing "a world born out of nightmares", are the product of several influences: alongside George Bacovia's melancholic poems, they host echoes from both Expressionism and Postmodern literature. Flămând ranks the posthumous Corabia lui Sebastian among "the best works written in this second half of the [20th] century", and compares its "cynicism" to the existential philosophy of Emil Cioran.

By that stage, Baconsky also became noted for theorizing the rejection of "consumerism", advocating instead a return to established cultural values. According to Flămând's 1985 essay, Baconsky's rejection of "consumerism" and the West was decisive, and culminated in a virulent decision of what Baconsky is known to have called "the occidental pharaoh". Braga also writes that, in both Cadavre în vid and Corabia lui Sebastian, Baconsky depicts his own version of a "crisis of the West" (the Abendland forming a setting of one poem), which he believed may have referenced Oswald Spengler's similar verdict (see The Decline of the West). Diana Câmpan noted the poems' dystopian imagery: "The Abendland is [...] an eerie Leviathan-like corpus, with attributes defining for humanity's decrepitude, a surrogate, anti-utopian citadel, handled in accordance with the laws of decline which grind the elites as well as the masses, the things as well their reflection". A part of the eponymous poem reads:

dans al cetăților, crepuscul roșu, abend-
land... agonia ticăloșitelor neamuri sufocate în aur
şi purpură veche... mercenarul strein călărește seara pe
colinele solitare
visând jaf şi incendii – destul vouă! Cuvintele-pești,
moarte pe ape
albe, meduzele infestează istoria... animale și păsări de
pradă pe
steaguri se schimbă în hiene și corbi...

Translation:

dance of the citadels, red crepuscule, abend-
land... the agony of the bastardized nations suffocated in gold
and old Tyrian purple... the old mercenary rides evenings on
the solitary hills
dreaming of pillages and fires—enough of you! The fish-words,
dead on the waters
of white, the jellyfish are invading history... animals and birds
of prey on
flags transforming into hyenas and ravens...

According to Mircea Braga, one of his last interviews shows that, while still criticized for "aestheticism", Baconsky merged his lyricism with an interest in social matters. The statement reads: "The writer is not a politician in the common and consecrated sense of the word. He does however have the role of a spiritual ferment [italics in the original]. He must not allow people to acquire cerebral obesity. He is always dissatisfied with something or other, his position is that of a permanent antithesis with the surrounding reality." Braga believes Baconsky's moral "rigor" to bear a "Transylvanian sign", and to have been ultimately inspired by the philosophy of Lucian Blaga. The related anti-capitalist vision is questioned by Cernat. The critic indicates that, although sincere in its patriotism, it was also "compatible" with the mixture of communism and nationalism introduced by the Ceauşescu regime (see National communism), and thus similar with the philosophical discourse of Constantin Noica.

=== Late prose works ===
With Remember, Drace-Francis argues, Baconsky advanced a technique first used by avant-garde writers of the 1930s, which transcended the norms imposed by traditional travel accounts in order to express "the inadequate representational possibilities of traditional forms" and to comment on the metaphysics of reality. Baconsky thus depicts his journey as an "interior adventure". This type of discourse, Drace-Francis contends, was a hint to his readers that the regime would not allow him to recount every detail of his journey. The book nevertheless also doubles as Baconsky's extended critique of the avant-garde of Europe, whose discourse, Diana Câmpan notes, Baconsky depicted as a form of desecration. In Tomuţa's view, the depiction of Vienna, with a focus on "the glorious vestiges of the past", takes the reader on a "voluptuous time travel." In the critic's definition, Baconsky's Vienna encloses a secondary reality, that is "ideal", "aestheticized", "fictional" and "bookish".

Drace-Francis also notes that the climate of relative liberalization and détente of the 1960s not only made such journeys possible, but actually allowed writers the freedom to go beyond stereotyped depictions of capitalism (while it remained uncertain whether Communist Romania's dialog with the West would "dominate the construction of epistemic value"). Overall, Cornel Ungureanu comments, Baconsky's accounts of his western travels are marked by "dark visions of the world." Ungureanu sees this as a sign of Baconsky's having "descended into Hell". Cernat, who extends his critique of Baconsky's anti-capitalist attitude to Remember, also argues that the author's "absolute freedom" of travel under a repressive regime indicates that his work was not perceived as a threat by the communist system.

Baconsky's prose fiction is closely linked to the themes and style of his poetry. In Braga's view, the fantasy collection Echinoxul nebunilor is a prosaic representative of its author's early commitment to aestheticism; according to Cernat, its tone is "apocalyptic". A characteristic of Baconsky's prose fiction is its resemblance to his poetry works, to the point where they were described by Crina Bud as "hybrid forms". In Bogdan Creţu's view, Biserica neagră, Baconsky's only novel, is written with "alexandrine-like purity". Likewise, the Corabia lui Sebastian poems were noted for moving into the realm of prose. This transgression of limits summoned objections from prominent literary critic Nicolae Manolescu, who reportedly believed Baconsky's work to be largely without merit.

Biserica neagră is also read as his most subversive work, described by critics as a "counter-utopia". Ungureanu sees it as a "Kafkaesque" work of absurdist inspiration, and a further sign of the author "descending into Hell". Crina Bud links the anti-utopian quality to contemporary writings by, among others, Matei Călinescu (Viaţa şi opiniile lui Zacharias Lichter, "The Life and Opinions of Zacharias Lichter") and Baconsky's friend Octavian Paler (Viaţa pe un peron—"Life on a Platform"; Un om norocos—"A Lucky Man"). Written from the perspective of a sculptor, who is probably a transposition of Baconsky himself, it is a parable of totalitarian command, artistic submission, individual despair and withdrawal. The volume also offers a glimpse into the world of political imprisonment under communism.

== Legacy ==
Anatol E. Baconsky was a noted presence in the literary community of his day, and is believed to have influenced poet, novelist and translator Petre Stoica (who is described by Ungureanu as the writer's "friend and emulator"). Baconsky's poems were parodied by Marin Sorescu in his 1964 volume, Singur printre poeţi ("Alone among Poets"). Sorescu's poem, titled A. E. Baconsky. Imn către necunoscutul din mine ("Hymn to the Unknown within Me"), makes use of Baconsky's lyrical style and displays of culture, showing the poet meditating about the ancient Scythian and Thracian peoples. It begins with the lines:

În mine-un scit se caută pe sine
Având drept torță marile neliniști
Cine ești tu? Cine sunt eu?
Unde e fluxul? Cine-s nohaii?
[...]
Dar niciodată eu nu-i spun nimic.
Căci nu știu, nu știu, nu știu cine's eu.
Mă bănui doar a fi, privind cravata-mi,
Singura certitudine cu nod,
Și mă întreb sfâșietor: oare tracii,
Vai, tracii, cum își croiau, prin veacuri, pantalonii?

Translation:

Within me a Scythe is searching for himself
Having for a torch the great uneases
Who are you? Who am I?
Where is the tide? Who are the Nogais?
[...]
But I never tell him anything.
For I don't know, I don't know, I don't know who I am.
I just suppose I exist, by gazing at my necktie,
The only certitude that has a knot,
And ask myself heartrendingly: the Thracians,
Alas, the Thracians, how did they, throughout the ages, tailor their pants?

Unusual episodes involving Baconsky's death were reported by two of his writer friends, Octavian Paler and Petre Stoica—Paler recalled that the only book to have fallen out of his shelf during the 1977 earthquake was Remember; Stoica told a similar story involving a painting that Baconsky had made, and which he had received as a gift. The writer's death, Cernat writes, was a "troubling coincidence" with that of Alexandru Ivasiuc: a former communist who, like Baconsky, had "radicalized" his vision and authored non-conformist pieces, Ivasiuc was himself a victim of the 1977 earthquake.

In the months following Baconsky's death, his new monograph on Sandro Botticelli, centered on the artist's illustrations for Dante Aligheri's Divine Comedy, was published in Romanian (re-issued in English during 1982). Cartea Românească reprinted Remember (1977), then Corabia lui Sebastian (1978). Also in 1978, his profile was included in 9 pentru eternitate ("9 for Eternity"), a volume dedicated to the literary men who had died during the earthquake, and edited by Mircea Micu and Gheorghe Tomozei. Eleven years later, a selection of his art criticism essays was published under the title Itinerarii plastice ("Artistic Itineraries"). Biserica neagră was only printed after the 1989 Revolution toppled communism.

Of the several books dedicated to his life and work, Crina Bud's 2006 volume, Rolurile şi rolul lui A. E. Baconsky în cultura română ("The Roles and Role of A. E. Baconsky in Romanian Culture"), is described by reviewers as one of the most complete. Bogdan Creţu comments that views of Baconsky are traditionally divided between two "extremist" positions: "he was either castigated for his sins of youth [...] or mythicized and raised to a level that his work could not have honored." Like Crina Bud, he believes Baconsky to have been a "vanquisher from a moral point of view", adding that he earned "absolution" from the victims of communism: "the writer passed the fire ordeal: he confessed." However, Cernat believes, Baconsky, like his fellow disillusioned communist Paler, refused to record his disappointment in writing other than allusively.

Baconsky and his wife Clara were noted art collectors. They owned representative works of Romanian art, particularly modern, including paintings by Dimitrie Ghiață, Ștefan Dimitrescu, Iosif Iser and Lucian Grigorescu, as well as drawings by Constantin Jiquidi, Theodor Pallady and Nicolae Tonitza. Their collection also included 19th century Romanian Orthodox icons and early prints from William Hogarth's A Rake's Progress. In 1982, the family donated these works to the National Museum, which set up a Baconsky Collection. 21 other works were donated to the Museum of Art Collections, where they also form a separate fund. Many of the books owned by Baconsky were donated by his brother Leon to the Library in Călimăneşti (which was consequently renamed the Anatol E. Baconsky Library).

== Published volumes ==
=== Poetry and prose fiction ===
- Poezii, poems, 1950
- Copiii din Valea Arieşului, poems, 1951
- Cîntece de zi şi noapte, poems, 1954
- Două poeme, poems, 1956
- Dincolo de iarnă, poems, 1957
- Fluxul memoriei, poems, 1957; retrospective edition, 1967
- Versuri, poems, 1961
- Imn către zorii de zi, poems, 1962
- Versuri, poems, 1964
- Fiul risipitor, poems, 1964
- Echinoxul nebunilor şi alte povestiri, short story anthology, 1967
- Cadavre în vid, poems, 1969
- Corabia lui Sebastian, poems, posthumous edition, 1978
- Biserica neagră, novel, in Scrieri, vol. II, posthumous edition, 1990

=== Travel writing ===
- Itinerar bulgar, 1954
- Călătorii în Europa şi Asia, 1960
- Cluj şi împrejurimile sale. Mic îndreptar turistic, 1963
- Remember, vol. I, 1968; vol. II, 1969

=== Criticism ===
- Colocviu critic, 1957
- Meridiane. Pagini despre literatura universală contemporană, 1965; second edition, 1969
- Dimitrie Ghiaţă, 1971
- Ion Ţuculescu, 1972
- Botticelli, 1974
- Botticelli, Divina Comedie, posthumous edition, 1977

=== Translations ===
- Poeţi clasici coreeni, 1960
- Salvatore Quasimodo, Versuri, 1961; second edition, 1968
- Jorge Semprún, Marea călătorie, 1962
- Artur Lundkvist, Versuri, 1963
- Poeţi şi poezie, 1963
- Mahabharata – Arderea zmeilor, 1964
- Carl Sandburg, Versuri, 1965
- Panorama poeziei universale contemporane, anthology, 1973
