= Petre Stoica =

Romanian poet and translator

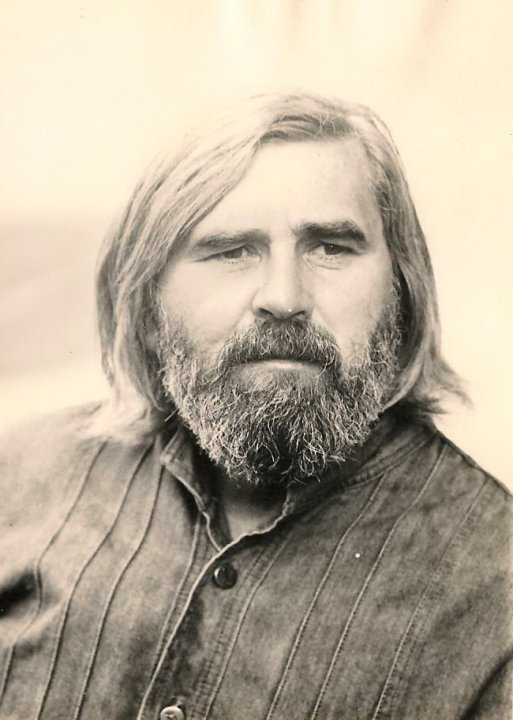
Petre Stoica

Petre Stoica (February 15, 1931 – March 21, 2009) was a Romanian poet and translator. A native of the Timișoara area, he studied at the University of Bucharest before launching a career as a writer. Making his debut in the late 1950s alongside several better-known generational colleagues, he published a number of books over the subsequent decades. His poetry dealt with quotidian subjects and studiously avoided glorification of the ruling communist regime. After the Romanian Revolution, he briefly engaged with the political scene before withdrawing to Jimbolia, not far from where he grew up. There, he worked to enrich the town's cultural life.

== Life ==
Born in Peciu Nou, Timiș County, in the Banat region, his parents were Adam Stoica and his wife Maria (née Bertan). As a child, he and his younger brother wandered around villages along the Bârzava and Timiș rivers, following their father, who headed a tax-collecting unit. After attending high school in Timișoara from 1942 to 1950, he studied at the Romanian-German section of the University of Bucharest's philology faculty, graduating in 1954. The choice of German was made by a dean seeking to meet a quota, but proved fortuitous for his later career. His parents were subjected to the Bărăgan deportations, and it was with difficulty that Stoica avoided being expelled from the university, particularly as he did not belong to the Union of Working Youth. While a student, he became friends with Modest Morariu and met Dimitrie Stelaru and Mircea Ivănescu; shortly after graduating, he drew notice from Paul Georgescu and Anatol E. Baconsky. In 1957, he took part in the formation of a group that included young writers passionate about literature, several of whom would achieve notoriety: aside from Morariu and Ivănescu, Nichita Stănescu, Matei Călinescu, and Cezar Baltag were also present in this collective.

From 1955 to 1962, he worked as a proofreader at EPL and ELU publishing houses. From 1963 to 1972, he was the editor-in-chief of Secolul 20 magazine. In the later years of the communist regime, he withdrew to Bulbucata, a village on the banks of the Neajlov River, and spent time gardening.

A supporter of the National Peasants' Party while an adolescent, he was briefly active in the revived Christian Democratic National Peasants' Party after the Romanian Revolution of 1989. At that point, he returned to Bucharest, writing feverishly for the newspapers in support of democracy and against a comeback of communism. Stoica then left the capital city and settled in Jimbolia, where the mayor offered him a house that had been nationalized under communism but not reclaimed by the previous owners. There, he established a Romanian-German cultural foundation and a press museum that had as its core his collection of newspapers. He also ensured that busts of Romanian and German poets were placed in the town. Toward the end of his life, Stoica developed lung cancer and gradually went blind.

== Work ==
Stoica's published debut took place in 1956, simultaneously in two magazines: Steaua and Tânărul scriitor. His first book, Poeme, appeared in 1957; as literature, it has been called his weakest effort. Publications that ran his work include Steaua, Viața Românească, România Literară, Tribuna, and Secolul 20. Through the books Pietre kilometrice (1963), Miracole (1966), Arheologie blândă (1968) and Melancolii inocente (1969), Stoica established himself as an original poet whose lyricism, according to critic Mihail Petroveanu, draws upon "a studied, naive view of daily life, called to reveal unsuspected miracles, and upon a sentimental pathos concealed beneath a smile complicit in forgotten destinies, creatures and objects eaten by 'the golden worm of time.'" In a similar vein, Alex Ștefănescu notes that Stoica's poems "pretend to be a chronicle of daily life. In reality, through an ingenious technique of decoupling and through brief commentaries made in good taste, the poet compels routine existence to reveal its lyrical resources." Notably, during the three decades he published under communism, he refused to join in the regime's triumphalist rhetoric about itself, entering a voluntary aesthetic exile and confining his verses to insignificant or obsolete matters. He did not refer to the cult of personality or the grinding poverty of the Nicolae Ceaușescu era. However, by completely ignoring the communist system, he sought to prove that a complete representation of existence was possible without it, and to restore a normal, older way of life.

His later books, Sufletul obiectelor (1972), Iepuri și anotimpuri (1976), Un potop de simpatii (1978), Copleșit de glorie (1980), Prognoză meteorologică (1981), Caligrafie și culori (1984), Suvenir (1986), Tango și alte dansuri (1989) and Uitat printre lucruri uitate (1997), include verses in which irony and a playful spirit blur a conscience that is lucid and attentive to shifts in contemporary sensibilities. Meanwhile, Stoica proved an accomplished translator, rendering into Romanian the works of Georg Trakl, Yvan Goll, and Johannes Bobrowski as well as anthologizing Austrian and Nordic poets; his work with modern German poets contributed to the emancipation of cultural life under communism. He won the Romanian Writers' Union prize in 1991.
