= Mihu Dragomir =

Romanian poet, prose writer and translator (1919–1964)

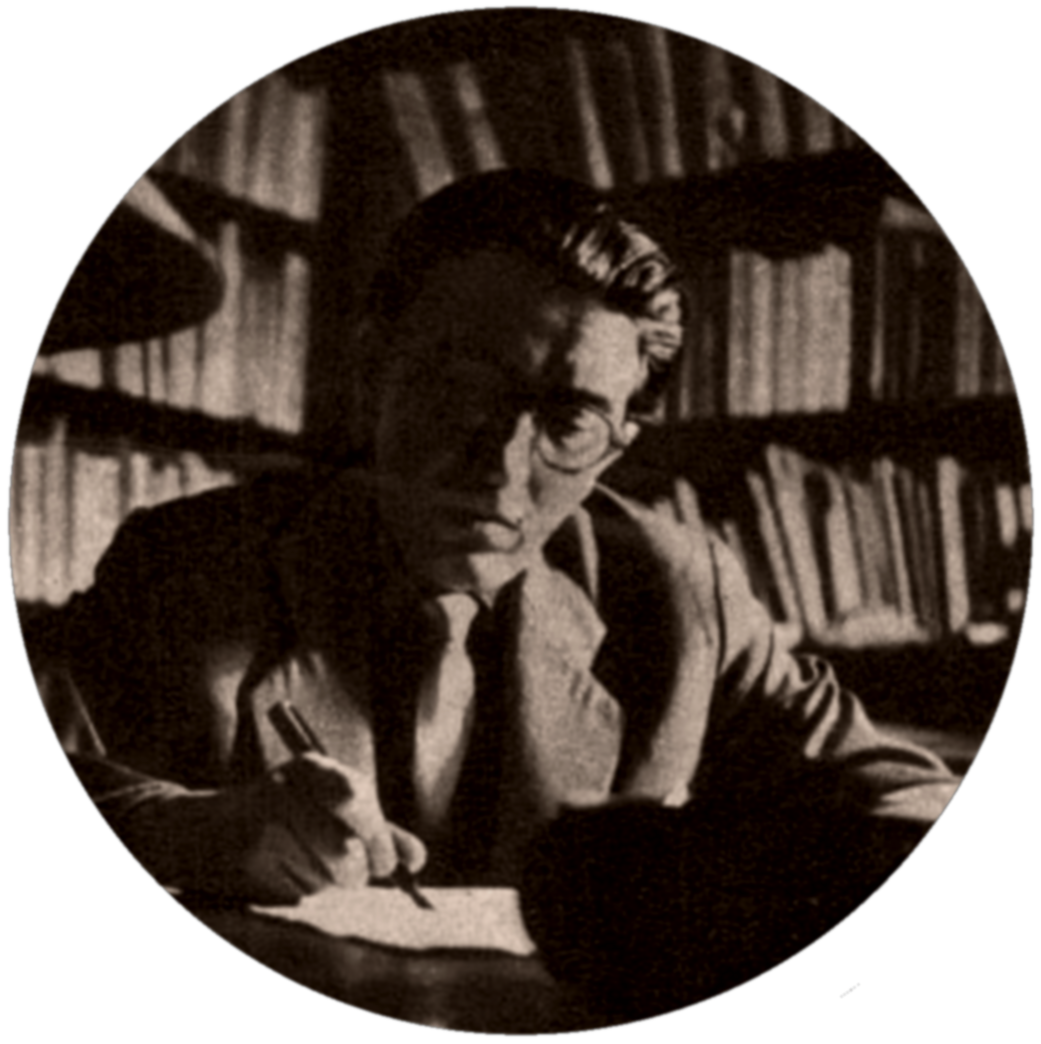
- Dragomir at his writing desk in November 1957
- Born: Mihail Constantin Dragomirescu; April 24, 1919; Brăila, Kingdom of Romania
- Died: April 9, 1964 (aged 44); Giurgiu, Romanian People's Republic
- Occupations: Journalist, publisher, soldier
- Writing career
- Pen name: Mișu Brăilițeanu, Miguel y Caramba, M. C. Dragomirescu, Jules Limah, Dr. M. C., Mihail
- Period: 1933–1964
- Genres: Lyric poetry; persona poetry; political poetry; ode; hymn; ballad; verse novel; short story; children's poetry; reportage; travel literature; science fiction; essay
- Literary movement: Neo-romanticism; Literary modernism; Avant-garde; Socialist realism; Romanian science fiction

Mihu Dragomir (pen name of Mihail Constantin Dragomirescu; April 24, 1919 – April 9, 1964) was a Romanian poet, prose writer and translator. A native of Brăila on the Bărăgan Plain, he was heavily influenced by the worldview of an older novelist, Panait Istrati, as well as by the poetic works of Mihai Eminescu and Edgar Allan Poe. He debuted in his early teens, and, before turning 19, had self-published his first volume of verse, also putting out the literary magazine Flamura. The late 1930s and early '40s saw his sympathy for, and finally engagement with, Romanian fascism—he joined the literary circle Adonis, founded by former members of the Crusade of Romanianism, and, during the "National Legionary State" of 1940, openly adhered to the Iron Guard. Rebelliousness interfered with Dragomir's educational path, but he recovered enough to train as a sapper, then as a junior officer, in the Romanian Land Forces. He fought in their ranks for the remainder of World War II, witnessing events which were retold in his poetic cycles (including a verse novel) and short-story collections.

The coup of August 1944 and the Soviet occupation of Romania were celebrated in Dragomir's poems as inaugural evens in a national revolution. He was joined he mass organizations of the Romanian Communist Party, moving from generic progressivism to Leninism, and then to explicit Stalinism. His political poetry pioneered the conceptions of socialist realism from as early as 1946; from 1948, the cultural authorities of Communist Romania employed him as editor of Viața Romînească, literary expert, translator of Russian literature, and purveyor of agitprop—though he was also excluded from the Party, and deemed ideologically unreliable, in 1950. His lyrical contributions were published in quick succession in the 1950s, and were celebrated at the time by the communist establishment—though they came to be seen as shameful by later scholarship, which examined their mediocre versification and their support for land collectivization. Dragomir continued to write poems that post-Stalinist reviewers upheld as more genuine, or even brilliant; he generally kept these for private use, or, when he published some of them, was attacked by his peers as an "escapist".

Dragomir was always seen as a suspicious figure by Communist Party cadres. These either viewed him as an infiltrator planted by post-fascist "enemy groups", or were alarmed by his alleged embrace of liberal socialism. He was isolated and sidelined after the Hungarian Revolution of 1956, upon which he was sent to work as a consultant for the local film industry, during which time he inspired The Thistles of the Baragan, adapted from Istrati's work. In July 1958, he became founder and main editor of the revived Luceafărul, though the regime would not allow him full credits for his work there. His main contribution to that venue, and to Romanian literature in general, was as a discoverer and promoter of new talent. In his late thirties and early forties, Dragomir also contributed to the Romanian science fiction scene and, upon witnessing the first manifestations of national-communism, inaugurated his own transition to philosophical, largely non-political, poetry; this included publishing work that he had authored in previous decades. His death from a heart attack at age 44 interrupted this effort, though six posthumous volumes were issued by his wife, into the 1980s.

== Biography ==
=== Humorist, fascist, soldier ===
The future poet was born in Brăila to a family of teachers—Constantin Dragomirescu and his wife Octavia-Olimpia (née Rădulescu). Musician Claudiu Moldovan claims that, due to his "brown complexion" and familiarity with Lăutari songs, Mihu Dragomir was mistakenly seen by Romanies as belonging to their own ethnic community. According to a memoir by film director Alexandru Struțeanu, he was always passionate about the Brăila-born and left-wing novelist Panait Istrati—viewing himself as a living version of Istrati's main character, Adrian Zografi. Upon reaching maturity, he was adverse to organized religion, praising poet Dumitru Theodor Neculuță for not giving in to "bourgeois institutions" such as the Romanian Orthodox Church.

Young Dragomir attended primary school in his native city, followed by Nicolae Bălcescu High School from 1929 to 1933. In 1933, he studied at Bucharest's Gheorghe Șincai High School, returning to Brăila for the Commercial High School from 1934 to 1936. Dragomir's first newspaper article appeared in Revista Tineretului Creștin in 1933; other contributions followed in the crossword magazines Revista Jocurilor, Rebus and Curentul Jocurilor, where he used the pen names Jules Limah, Dr. M. C., Mihail, Mișu Brăilițeanu and M. C. Dragomirescu. His first poems appeared in print in 1936, in the Silistra-based Valuri Dunărene. That year, he self-published his first book of poems, Gânduri prăfuite ("Dusty Thoughts"), in 200 copies. In summer 1936, he traced Istrati's steps together with his friend Niță Vrînceanu, organizing a riotous party in Baldovinești together with Moș Dumitru (whose life had been fictionalized by Istrati).

Expelled out of school for a "nihilist" attitude, Dragomir re-enrolled in autumn 1936, and graduated at the top of his class in 1939. He also founded Flamura ("The Pennon") magazine in Brăila in 1937, handing its management to Ștefan Topcea (known then as Mac Antoniu) and Gheorghe Capagea-Rosetti in early 1939. By May 1939, he had been drafted into the Romanian Land Forces as a sapper, and was assigned to a garrison in Brăila; he was considering quitting school and emigrating to Antwerp. That summer, after a short stay in northern Moldavia, he eventually passed his baccalaureate in Galați. The same year, he entered the Bucharest Commercial Academy, and by 1940 was hosted at a dormitory on Cuza-Vodă Street. He eventually interrupted his business training in order to attend the Bacău reserve officers' school from 1940 to 1941. Dragomir also returned to publishing with short poetry collections: Rugă de ateu, adică vorbe despre orânduieli și cârmuitori ("An Atheist's Prayer, Which Is to Say a Talk of Regimes and Rulers", 1938) and Înger condeier ("Scribbling Angel", 1939). Magazines that published his work include Universul Literar, Luceafărul, Revista Fundațiilor Regale, Viață și Suflet, Năzuința, Junimea Dobrogeană, Raza Literară, Cadran, Festival, Păcală, and Epigrama. He first used the pen name Mihu Dragomir in Flamura in 1938.

September 1939 masthead of Prepoem, Dragomir's "magazine for the affirmation of young Romanian poetry"

The late 1930s witnessed a rise of the Iron Guard and other fascist groups; this political setting touched Dragomir's debut years, leading to controversy. In early 1938, Viață și Suflet, managed by Capagea-Rosetti, had already been described in Cuvântul as one of "two good Guardist publications put out from Brăila." In 2005, literary historian Geo Șerban spoke of Dragomir's admiration for the Guardist leader Corneliu Zelea Codreanu, as a "juvenile conviction that poetry will gain its vitality once it embraces the arsenal of Codrenist ideology." A proof of "indisputable adherence to Guardism", such contributions "vanished from [Dragomir's] bibliography". Paul Bărbulescu and Virgil Treboniu, former members of a Guardist splinter group called "Crusade of Romanianism", had set up a poetry circle, Adonis. Its eponymous magazine hosted Dragomir's writing; his poems were also featured in the Adonis anthology of love poems, out in late 1939. In 1940, when Dragomir composed a poem named for Edgar Allan Poe, it was published by Adonis and the Ionescu-Tămădău printing press. Those months brought Dragomir's debut as a translator, with versions of poems by Poe (in an edition seen by critic Aurel Martin as "excellent") and Charles Baudelaire. By January 1940, Dragomir was present for Bărbulescu's literary sessions, which were also attended by a literary celebrity, Tudor Arghezi. In later years, allegations surfaced that Dragomir himself had affiliated with the Crusade.

The modernist magazine Prepoem, which was in print during early 1940 and had an anonymized editorial staff, hosted and celebrated Dragomir as a highly valuable talent; as noted in a 1960 polemical letter by the more senior poet Vintilă Horia, Dragomir was in fact its editor-in-chief, infusing the journal with the fascist agenda. At Prepoem, he announced at the time that he had prepared over six volumes of verse. The Iron Guard ascended to power in late 1940, establishing a "National Legionary State" that lasted to January 1941. This regime was supported by Dragomir and his Flamura, in particular after it emerged that a more senior poet, Ion Barbu, was a Guard affiliate. On December 1, 1940, Dragomir wrote about the "green pennon of the Guard, and the azure pennon of eternal Poetry", flying side by side. In 1976, researcher Nicolae Florescu, who published Barbu's thank-you letter, but not Dragomir's original article, calls the latter "rather confusing in its exaltation". As Șerban notes, in his response Barbu seemed not to know, and not to ultimately care, that Dragomir was himself a poet.

=== Communist reemergence ===
Dragomir survived the civil war of 1941, in which the Guard was chased out by Conducător Ion Antonescu. He resumed university classes in 1942, but was mobilized in 1943 and saw action in World War II until 1945. His service overlapped with the coup of August 23, 1944, which saw Romania abandoning the Axis powers and aligning itself with the Soviet Union—in his later poems, Dragomir described this as an act of national liberation. He continued his studies, with interruptions, until graduating in 1948. His return to journalism came in late 1944, when Ștefan Baciu hosted his pieces, signed as Miguel y Caramba, in his Humorul magazine. From 1945 to 1946, he was cultural officer in the Romanian Communist Party-affiliated Organization of Progressive Youth (UTP), while his wife, known as "Titi", was employed in an identical position by the Union of Antifascist Women.

In November 1945, after clashes with the anti-communist National Peasantists and National Liberals, Dragomir represented the UTP at a rally in Brăila, as one of the speakers who demanded that the two "fascist" groups be outlawed. Starting in 1946, he was a practitioner of socialist realism. He first stated his new aesthetic goals in a manifesto he wrote alongside G. Climatiano, and which he presented for review in the Communist Party newspaper, Scînteia. An editor at the Brăila newspaper Înainte from 1946 to 1948, he wrote to Vrînceanu that he was "studying Leninism", that he had attempted to set up a circle of Esperanto speakers, and that he considered entering academia or the diplomatic service. He finally moved to a similar editorial position at Viața Romînească of Bucharest, maintaining it from 1948 to 1954—in the early years of the communist regime.

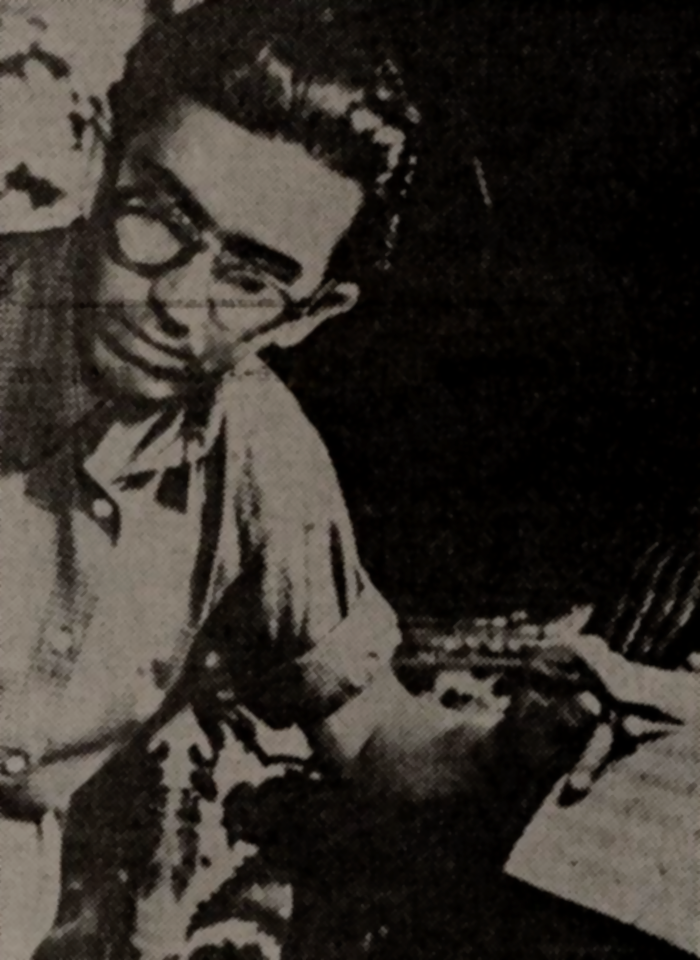
Dragomir c. 1944

During that interval, Dragomir debuted as an exegete of the national poet, Mihai Eminescu. According to literary scholar Niculae Stoian, samples of his work in the field include an Eminescu lecture at Bucharest's Dalles Hall, as well as an "extremely courageous" study of Doina, hosted by Înainte in 1949. More secretly, his loyalty to communism was being assessed by the Securitate staff and the Communist Party's Agitprop section. As early as 1949, a classified document of the latter discussed "Mihu Dragomir, a former Guardist", as being in permanent contact with an "enemy group" formed around Andrei Ciurunga. The anonymous author alleged that Dragomir had once misplaced his personal papers in a public area, upon which the Securitate had stumbled upon evidence that he had been a wartime informant, involved with "staking out" a communist activist, Manole H. Manole. His ideological commitments were probed in March 1950, when a review board excluded Dragomir from the "Workers' Party" (as the Communists Party was then known); the decision also affected other writers, variously including Vladimir Cavarnali, Sanda Movilă, Zaharia Stancu, and Victor Tulbure. All were still allowed to write, due to an intervention on their behalf by the communist potentate Ana Pauker, but were also made to undergo ideological training with Miron Constantinescu and Leonte Răutu.

Also in 1950, Dragomir had published reportages—sponsored by the Writers' Union of Romania (USR), and asked by it to follow a Soviet model. In 1951, he published his translation of poems by Alexey Surkov, largely dealing Surkov's experience in the Russian Civil War. Dragomir's own scattered contributions from Romania's early communist period feature a hymn to Joseph Stalin, with music by Anatol Vieru. Writing in 1950, critic Mihai Gafița claimed that "the masses know and sing that song", which "contributes toward deepening their love for comrade Stalin." At Viața Romînească, Dragomir was interested in the overall development of propaganda through song. In a December 1952 piece, he panned lyricists such as Constantin Ghiban, Ștefan Tita, Nicolae Nasta, and Harry Negrin, whom he saw as cultivating the staples of vaudeville. By then, he had attended USR meetings which introduced the new and strict directives of literary Stalinism, with reference to Georgy Malenkov's speeches. He agreed with Malenkov's rejection of literary "glumness", noting that "glum" images had appeared in poems by Tulbure and Nina Cassian.

From 1954 to 1956, Dragomir was editor-in-chief of Tânărul Scriitor, put out by the USR as a trade magazine for young communist authors. The poetry books he put out during the time were Prima șarjă ("The First Assault", 1950), Stelele păcii ("Star of Peace", 1952), Războiul ("The War", 1954), Tudor din Vladimiri (1954), Pe struna fulgerelor ("On the String of Lightnings", 1955), Versuri alese ("Selected Verse", 1957), and Odă pământului meu ("An Ode to My Land", 1957). In November 1954, the USR staged a ceremony to mark Neculuță's 50-year commemoration. Dragomir gave a lecture, while Demostene Botez and Ioanichie Olteanu read out from Neculuță's Spre țărmul dreptății. With Veronica Porumbacu and Mihail Petroveanu, he also authored a screenplay called Cheia văii, but complained that the "relevant authorities in cinema" were unwilling to film it. Around that time, Editura Cartea Rusă received his translations of poems by Vladimir Mayakovsky and Konstantin Simonov, as well as the entirety of Alexander Yashin's Alena Fomina (the latter as a collaboration with C. Argeșeanu). His renditions formed a significant portion of a Simonov edition which came out in late 1955, but he was criticized by a fellow writer, Dimitrie Florea-Rariște, for not capturing the "plenitude of [Simonov's] lyricism". He also penned other translations from socialist contributors to Russian and Bulgarian literature—Nikola Vaptsarov and Nikolai Tikhonov. He had abandoned his work in the promotion of Esperanto, describing that language as "artificial and cold, practically useless."

Dragomir was rewarded by the communist state. He twice a recipient of its State Prize, one of which was in 1955, for Războiul. Dragomir's career suffered during the Hungarian Revolution of 1956, when the Romanian communist leadership became alarmed about the local spread of liberal socialism. This was noted by novelist and defector Petru Dumitriu, who informed the Central Intelligence Agency on the status of cultural dissent. Dumitriu assessed that Dragomir and Tulbure, alongside Alexandru Andrițoiu, Francisc Munteanu, and Titus Popovici, were being perceived as direct threats by Communist-Party potentates. Dragomir's supposed engagement in the Crusade became a topic of denunciation and debate during the Young Writers' Conference of 1956. By contrast with Dumitriu, the liberal-communist poet Miron Radu Paraschivescu wrote in his secret diary that Dragomir was one of the "most business-minded elements on the right", who had infiltrated a genuine revolution after having "suckled at the tit of each regime and each budget"; Paraschivescu's category of far-right "covert agents" also included Florea-Rariște, Anatol E. Baconsky, and Eusebiu Camilar. In his 1960 text, the self-exiled Horia remarked that Dragomir and Camilar, like Mihai Ralea and Costin Murgescu, still managed to become communist "collaborators" despite their early engagement with fascism. Literary scholar Eugen Negrici argues that, as one "recovered from the right-wing areas", Dragomir suffused literary communism with echoes from clerical fascism and the Iron Guard's Orthodox mysticism.

=== Marginalization and Luceafărul ===
After his association with Tânărul Scriitor ended, and down to 1958, Dragomir worked as editor-in-chief at the script-writing section of the Bucharest Cinematographic Center. In preparation for a national commemoration of the peasants' revolt of 1907, he proposed to film The Thistles of the Baragan, based on a novel by Istrati. His project was accepted and Louis Daquin was taken in as its director, with Struțeanu providing the screenplay. The three of them together sailed the Danube in the location scouting phase of 1957, but Dragomir handed in his resignation during the production stage. He was soon affiliated with the relaunched Luceafărul, serving on its editorial board from July 15, 1958 to 1960. Though sometimes credited as the editor-in-chief, he was in fact barred from taking on that role. In a 1988 piece, literary historian Lucian Chișu reports that this was due to "adverse circumstances", when Dragomir was the man most responsible for the magazine's existence; Dragomir had drafted the earliest project for a publication appealing to "young talents", for which he had proposed the name of Miorița. When this was approved, with a change of titles and with a transfer of staff from Tânărul Scriitor, he handled three specialized columns. One was dedicated to poetics, and the other two, which were "feverishly read" by the general public, introduced new poetic talents, some of whom became local celebrities. He is credited with having helped discover Constanța Buzea, Adrian Păunescu, and Alexandru Ivasiuc.

Staff colleagues included poet Petru Vintilă, who recalled in 1988: "Mihu Dragomir, with his dark complexion and fleshy lips, led our meetings, watching us through eyes covered by I couldn't tell you how many diopters of lenses [...]. I had been his friend for a long time, I loved him for his inimitable humanness, [...] and, obviously, I was amazed to discover in him the consummate editor-in-chief, willing to accept any new idea". Overall, however, he "preserved a rather academic and traditional line" when it came to the magazine's content. Vintilă and Fănuș Neagu were both co-editors and contributors, and sometimes took over for Dragomir in going over the readers' submissions. Neagu claims that, after going over 18,000 letters containing no publishable poem, they burned the accumulated stash—resulting in Dragomir halving their salaries for two weeks. According to Vintilă, Dragomir finally quit Luceafărul: "If I recall correctly, he was being subjected to an annoying obstruction by some hangers-on."

Dragomir continued to publish his own poetry in various installments: Pe drumuri nesfîrșite ("On Endless Roads", 1958), Întoarcerea armelor ("Weapons-turning", 1959), Poveștile bălții ("Stories of the Pond", 1959), Stelele așteaptă pămîntul ("Stars Await the Earth", 1961), and Inelul lui Saturn ("Saturn's Ring", 1964). His work as a translator also covered H. G. Wells, John Steinbeck, and Lope de Vega; he also had noted contributions as a literary historian, with new essays on Eminescu, Alexandru Macedonski, and George Ranetti. In 1959, he curated and prefaced a reissue of Spre țărmul dreptății. A volume of his own prose appeared in 1961, as La început a fost sfîrșitul ("First, There Was the End"). By then, Dragomir had been integrated within a new generation of Romanian science fiction authors, with samples taken up by the literary supplement of Știință și Tehnică magazine; such prose appeared in 1962 as Povestiri deocamdată fantastice ("Stories for Now Fantastic"). At Luceafărul, he was also reviewing the work of other science fiction authors, criticizing Gheorghe Săsărman for rehashing old narrative tropes into a science fantasy format.

Dragomir died of a heart attack in Giurgiu on April 9, 1964, shortly before turning 45; he was reportedly there on a literary assignment. His body was taken to Bucharest. On April 11, after a ceremony hosted by the USR (where Tulbure recited a poem dedicated to his late friend), it was cremated at Cenușa. The following year saw the publication of a poetry collection, Șarpele fantastic ("The Fantastic Snake"). His widow Chira (known in full as Chiriachița Dragomirescu) kept over 1,000 unpublished poems of his, which came out as additional volumes: Pămîntul cîntecului ("Land of Song", 1967), Dor ("Longing", 1969), Minutar peste netimp ("A Minute Hand over Nontime", 1974), and Noapte calmă ("A Calm Night", 1980). She also bequeathed some of her late husband's manuscripts to Stoian, but personally handled a retrospective edition, Sărbătorile poetului ("The Poet's Celebrations"), as it came out in 1988. Its preface was one of the last contributions penned by critic Mircea Scarlat. Dragomir's memory as an author of science fiction was preserved by the radioplay Reîntîlnire cu Griffit ("Upon Reuniting with Griffit"). Based on one of his stories, it was aired in June 1968 on national radio's program for Pioneers. Brăila County's Council for Socialist Culture and Education celebrated his 60th birthday in April 1979 with a literary session. Guests included Neagu, Stoian, George Bălăiță, Ion Dodu Bălan, Corneliu Leu, George Macovescu, Damian Necula, and Gica Iuteș, alongside Chira Dragomir. From 1981, his native city came to host a "Gala of patriotic and revolutionary poetry" honoring the poet, and named after his Odă pământului meu.

== Work ==
=== Poetic debut and transition ===
Dragomir's first four books, seen by Mircea Scarlat as samples of "social-leaning neo-romanticism", remain the least discussed segments of his poetic output. In Gânduri prăfuite, the teen-aged poet was at least partly influenced by Eminescu brand of Romantic poetry, opening his volume with a motto from Eminescu's "To My Critics". Noting this fact, Stoian also proposes that, when Dragomir found his "other masters, such as the American demoniac Edgar Allan Poe, he did not let go of [Eminescu,] his first teacher in matters of poetry and living". Aurel Martin believes that the Poesque influence, doubled and enhanced by that of Paul Verlaine, created thematic links between Dragomir and a vagabond-poet Dimitrie Stelaru; both men had literary personas whom they depicted as "angels". In Dragomir's debut years, which saw his temporary incorporation of avant-garde aesthetics, cultural journalists discussed him as lacking in discernment or taste. In Convorbiri Literare, Teodor Al. Munteanu described one of his articles in Viață și Suflet as promoting "banal" poems. Dragomir treated their authors with such "feelings of friendship that should not have interfered with correct literary information." As suggested in 1940 by N. Rahova of Însemnări Ieșene magazine, Prepoem also constituted a mixture of "good enough poems, bad poems, and, spread out here and there, poems that are of a very good inspiration". The same conclusion appears in a 1994 text by Geo Șerban, describing Flamura in 1940 as a mix of "truly gifted" contributors, such as Ion Caraion, and "nomadic improvisers" like Constantin Mitea.

Upon reading the youthful pieces only included in Noapte calmă, Florența Albu, herself a poet, concluded that they were "uneven", alternating extremist stances with "gentle poems" about the Danube and the Bărăgan Plain. Essayist Lucian Raicu sees the latter works as "rare glimpses of calmness and stability", bordering on Eminescu's own depiction of tranquility—and with the therapeutic purpose of "shielding the poet" from "the more painful questions". Raicu reserves his praise for samples in which Dragomir finds authenticity of feeling, and a poetic voice, with the "curiously prolonged dwelling" on themes of unrequited love. One such piece reads:

Strada, strada blestemată, a ivit o siluetă
Și ochii tăi m-au frămîntat și m-au durut.
Mirosul sîmburelui crud
De sărutare și oftat, mă-ncape.
Vezi? Versul e mic și ud
De lacrimi, tentații și ape.

Translation:

The street, damn that street, has shown me those contours,
The sting of your eyes that has had me flayed.
The smell of kernel, all raw, and I wailed,
It fills me with kisses, and moans, and with splatter.
See here, my lyrics are soaked—and curtailed,
With tears, with temptation and water.

In 1943, Dragomir earned attention from critic Ovidiu Papadima with poems about combat on the Eastern Front. As noted by Papadima, these came in succession to Camil Petrescu's works about the previous world war—a poetry that was "lucid, urban, its sadness spent on the material aspect of war". Some two years later, Dragomir returned with political poems seen by Negrici as "iconoclastic" and "progressive", with a revolt that still appeared "normal in the dialectic of poetic cycles". Negrici situates him alongside other left-wingers of that time, from Alexandru Toma and Sașa Pană to Radu Boureanu, Geo Dumitrescu, Magda Isanos, and Eugen Jebeleanu. Eventually, Dragomir was consecrated by his official communist poetry. Upon publication, his and Climatiano's manifesto, calling for literature to be "anchor[ed] in reality", was welcomed by the communist columnist Paul Cornea, who only chided the "somewhat bloated and at times declamatory style". Dragomir's official obituary, put out by the USR, lauded his "vigorous talent [which] has reached its full and well-rounded affirmation in the people's power era. [...] The pages of his books attest to the poet's attachment and dedication to all that was daring and generous during the years when socialism was being constructed."

Dragomir's political engagement reflected on his view of other authors: in the late 1950s, he persistently accused Baconsky of cultivating "escapism". Critics of the day, such as Valeriu Cristea, gave enthusiastic appraisals of Dragomir's poetry, but these were contradicted in later years—literary scholars Nicolae Mecu and Adriana Catrina describe his output as forgettable. In 1980, Albu had noted that: "[Dragomir's] short, plain, sincere lines—life's own poetry—begin to be engulfed by oratory, by the platitudes of poetry, after 1950." In her own 2013 overview, Catrina concludes that "present-day opinion condemns such literature as a black spot in the Romanian literary history."

=== Propaganda themes ===
As noted by Negrici, Dragomir, alongside Toma, Tulbure, and Dan Deșliu, "quickly ran through all the social-professional subjects", making it hard for other poets to fulfill the "party command" of writing for and about workers. Stelele păcii was officially praised in Contemporanul for exploring the life and death of "enlightened workers", for instance by its posthumous ode to Pyotr Pavlenko, "dead at his writing desk." He had an especially controversial status as a propagandist for land collectivization, depicting collective-farm managers in terms that, Negrici argues, evoke the Knights of the Round Table. One other such piece was Fostul mijlocaș ("Once, a Yeoman"), which Dragomir still took pride in writing, "since he let [it] be included in the 1956 collection Versuri alese." He upheld the notion that soldiers of the Red Army were teachers of the Romanian people, while contributing to Joseph Stalin's cult of personality; at the time of Stalin's death, he reused lyrical themes apparently evoking the crucifixion of Jesus. By 1951, Dragomir had drawn subject matter from the Greek Civil War, mourning the fate of Nikos Beloyannis. Like other poets of his generation, he was commissioned to versify the Tito–Stalin split, in terms which suggested that Titoism was the "new fascism". He identified Socialist Yugoslavia as an absolute villain:

În Belgradul tăcut, ca-ntr-un ochian
privește Tito, mândru de ispravă,
și din balcon, trimis-american
privește-orașul oferit pe tavă

Translation:

His eyes on Belgrade, now a gloomy mess,
sits Tito, very proud of what he's done,
and with him is his liege from the US —
gazing upon another city he can run.

Pe drumuri nesfîrșite was effectively a personal anthology focused on socialist patriotism and the "patriotic education of our soldiers". It offers glimpses of Dragomir's own life as a "communist man" in the trenches of World War II, alongside landscape poetry of the Siret Valley. Stylistically, Războiul originated from old peasant folklore, with its laments against conscription (known as cântece de cătănie). It developed into a verse novel centered on the 1940s experiences of a "fighter for peace" engaged in the armed struggle against Nazi Germany. As explained by Dragomir himself, its content evidenced "the unshakable friendship that's formed between the Soviet people and our own people." While still a formal communist, Petru Dumitriu suggested that Războiul could be translated into English or French, which would have scored a Soviet victory in the campaign for world peace. The prose penchant of Războiul, La început a fost sfîrșitul aims o depict the anti-Soviet war as "illogical" and "invasive". Its stories depict acts of belated anti-fascist positioning, such as peasants refusing to colonize Transnistria, or soldiers disarming their Wehrmacht colleagues upon hearing that a truce had been signed; these were poorly reviewed in 1963 by journalist I. Miron, who commented on Dragomir's "hastiness" and reliance on "platitudes".

With similar folkloric roots, Tudor din Valdimiri presents as a retelling of the Wallachian uprising of 1821 in ballad form. In Inelul lui Saturn, subjects are drawn from the life of Vladimir Lenin and his leading the October Revolution, Pioneer outings, planned urbanization with the construction of tower blocs, and communist symbolism (including the red flag and the Soviet State Emblem). The poem Roșu ("Red") dwells on the overall political significance of a political color:

Roșu de-o mare de stele,
roșu de holdele grele,
roșu, sub cearcănul lunii,
de zorii și-amiaza Comunii.

Translation:

Red with the stars and their light,
red with the moon in the night,
red in the wheat and its boon,
in the Commune, at morning, at noon.

Other such pieces celebrated the major events of communist historiography, including the 1907 revolt, the Grivița strike of 1933, the August 23 events, the 1948 Constitution, and the nationalization of industry. In one such contribution, Dragomir writes about the leading role of the Communist Party:

În cîntecul de azi,
cînd patria-și adună,
buchetele-mplinirii,
pe-ntinsurile ei,
e dragostea-nchinată
pornirii de furtună
ce-a ridicat poporul
în August 23.

Translation:

The song we sing for thee,
when our country mustered
the flowers of its glee,
and had them on display,
is passion we collected
from the people flustered,
from when that storm began,
on August twenty-three.

=== Return to authenticity ===
In his socialist-realist years, Dragomir had to fend off accusations of "formalism". His loving depiction of the Măcin Mountains and their Lipovans, included in Stelele păcii, was rejected by Contemporanul as too idyllic for the new aesthetic standards. A 1953 article by Sami Damian mentioned that some of Dragomir's poems had displayed "individualism" and a "bourgeois conception" of literature. The de-Stalinization process allowed him and his colleagues more room for expression. Poveștile bălții, a work of children's verse, had a main "essentially poetic" topic in the jocular depictions of animals and plants thriving on the Danube Delta, but also included parts in which the "new socialist realities are outlined for our early readers." Albu notes the existence of impressive "glades" in his otherwise dogmatic verse, suggesting that Dragomir was an authentic poet in Stelele așteaptă pămîntul, with its lyrical depiction of the Space Race, and especially in the 1960s melancholy cycle, Cuvintele ("The Words"), which only appeared in Noapte calmă. Of Dragomir's science-fiction period, the story Natura inversă ("Inverted Nature") was hailed as genuinely beautiful in reviews by Ovid Crohmălniceanu and Ion Hobana.

Those who knew Dragomir reported a more spontaneous and non-political side of his political creation, largely manifested in oral form. Boureanu mentions his colleague's classical sensibilities: Dragomir recited from Horace, or spontaneously imitated the Horatian odes, during one of their outings in Sulina. Struțeanu similarly recalls Dragomir improvising an homage to the swans of the Danube, which mentioned poetic loves (Sappho, Inês de Castro, and Veronica Micle). According to his colleague Gheorghe Tomozei, Dragomir's "fragile" work of the 1950s concealed his matured talents, mostly spent on "the construction of a new literature and a new literary climate that he himself, alas, never got to witness." As Scarlat notes, Dragomir "misfortune was in that his most obsolete writing was the most circulated, and as such he best known"; a similar view was expressed in 1988 by scholar Teodor Vârgolici, according to whom Dragomir's death interrupted his process of stripping off the "dogmatic rhetoric and clamorous conventionalism of the 1950s", whereupon he would have emerged as "one of [Romania's] greatest contemporary poets". The "fantastic snake" metaphor lines up with Dragomir's late-stage philosophical poetry—the poet reflects on himself reflecting, "coiling on himself tenfold". The eponymous volume sees him calmly investigating mortality, notions of the afterlife, and human purpose:

credeam că zboru-n lună e ultimul meu vis,
și-acum e-o filă veche
în ochiul meu deschis...

Translation:

I though that moon-travels were what I desired,
but now my eye stares down
on a page that's expired...
