= Mihail Petroveanu =

Romanian literary critic and historian

Mihail Petroveanu (October 28, 1923–March 4, 1977) was a Romanian literary critic and historian.

Born in Bucharest, his parents were Jean Petroveanu and his wife Maria (née Algazi). He attended primary school and the first six grades of secondary school at Saint Andrew High School in his native city from 1930 to 1940. From 1940 to 1942, he studied at and graduated from the theoretical high school where Alexandru Graur was principal. In 1944, Petroveanu enrolled in the French-Romanian section of the University of Bucharest's literature faculty, graduating in 1947. During this time, his first work was published; this consisted of literary news that appeared in Studentul român in 1945. Right after completing university, he was hired as an editor for Contemporanul. He was then a teaching assistant at the aesthetics department of the Institute of Theater, Fine Arts and Music (1949–1950); editor for the literary programs of Romanian Radio (1948–1952); chief department editor and overall adjunct editor at Editura de Stat pentru Literatură și Artă (1950–1955); editor and adjunct editor-in-chief at Viața Românească (1955–1956) and Gazeta literară (1956–1961); principal editor for a four-language publication meant for foreign audiences, Revue roumaine – Roumanian Review – Rumänische Rundschau – Румынская литература (1962–1977).

By 1958, Petroveanu was already a name frequently met in the country's main literary magazines. That year, he published his first book, Pagini critice, a collection of articles and reviews he had written for Studentul român, Flacăra, Contemporanul, Viața Românească, Steaua, Scînteia and Gazeta literară between 1947 and 1957. His later studies appeared in Profiluri lirice contemporane (1963), Studii literare (1966) and Traiectorii lirice (1974); he also authored two monographs, Tudor Arghezi, poetul (1961) and George Bacovia (1969; second edition, 1972). In collaboration, he supervised an excellent edition of George Bacovia's works, which appeared as Opere in 1978. He translated Jules Verne's In Search of the Castaways. Petroveanu was involved in supervising critical editions of Ion Luca Caragiale (1950, 1958, 1959, 1960, 1973), Aleksandr Chakovsky (1950), Guy de Maupassant (1950), Mateiu Caragiale (1957), Nicolae Velea (1960), Platon Pardău (1963), Anatol E. Baconsky (1964), Demostene Botez (1964), Ion Vinea (1964), Adrian Maniu (1965), Sașa Pană (1966), Agatha Bacovia (1967), and Ion Caraion (1978).

He was married to poet Veronica Porumbacu; the couple died in the 1977 Vrancea earthquake while on a visit to Baconsky.
