= 1977 Vrancea earthquake =

Romanian earthquake

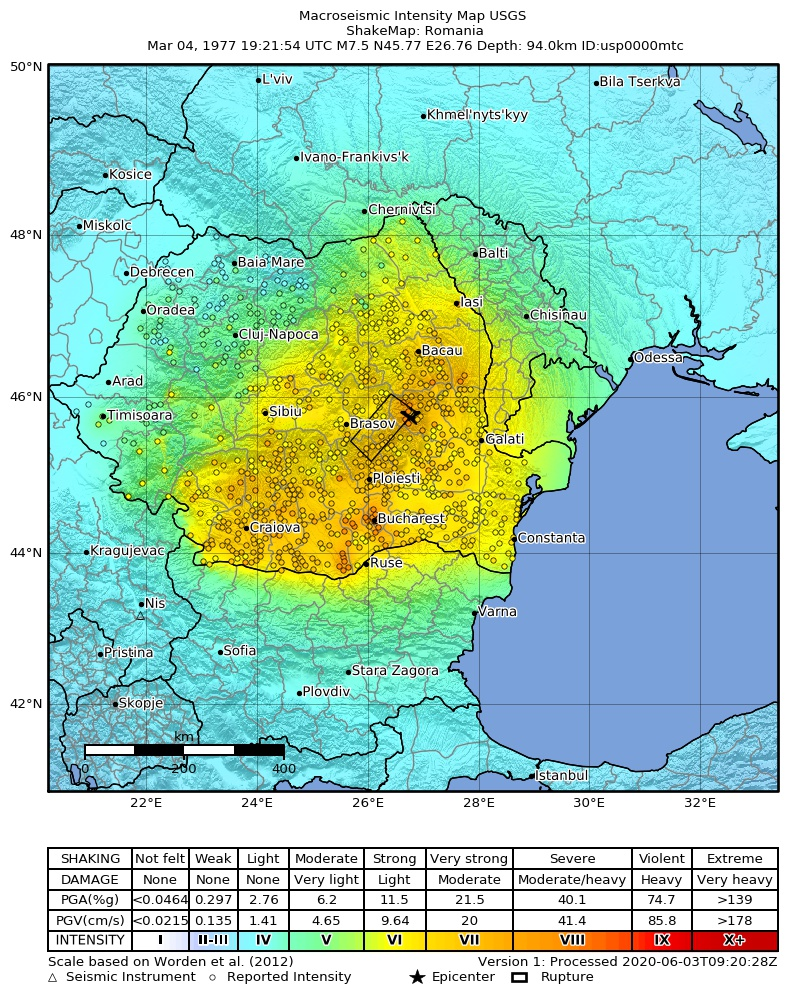

- Location within Romania
- UTC time: 1977-03-04 19:21:57
- ISC event: 700695
- USGS-ANSS: ComCat
- Local date: 4 March 1977
- Local time: 21:21:57
- Duration: 55 seconds
- Magnitude: 7.5 M_{w}
- Depth: 85.3 kilometres (53 mi)
- Epicenter: 45°46′N 26°46′E
- Areas affected: Romania; Bulgaria; Soviet Union; Moldavian SSR; Ukrainian SSR
- Total damage: US$2.048 billion
- Max. intensity: MMI IX (Violent)
- Landslides: Yes
- Casualties: 1,578 dead, 11,221 injured in Romania; 120 dead, 165 injured in Bulgaria; 2 dead in Moldova

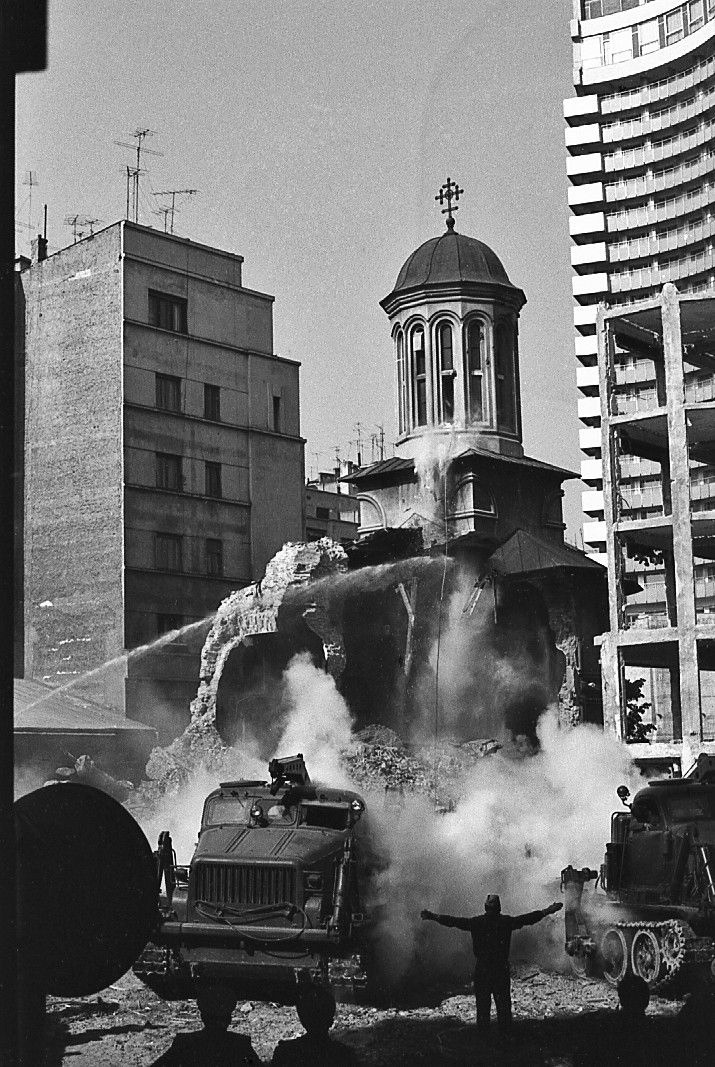
Enei Church, severely damaged during the 1977 earthquake, was later demolished.

The 1977 Vrancea earthquake occurred on 4 March 1977, at 21:22 local time, and was felt throughout the Balkans. It had a magnitude of 7.5, making it the second most powerful earthquake recorded in Romania in the 20th century, after the 10 November 1940 seismic event. The hypocenter was situated in the Vrancea Mountains, the most seismically active part of Romania, at a depth of 85.3 km.

The earthquake killed about 1,578 people in Romania, 1,424 of them in Bucharest, and left more than 11,300 injured. Among the victims were actor Toma Caragiu and writers A. E. Bakonsky, Alexandru Ivasiuc and Corneliu M. Popescu. Communist ruler Nicolae Ceaușescu suspended his official visit to Nigeria and declared a state of emergency.

About 32,900 buildings were damaged or destroyed. Immediately after the earthquake, 35,000 families were without shelter. The economic losses are believed to have been as high as two billion US dollars though the sum was not confirmed by the authorities at that time. A detailed report on the destruction the earthquake caused was never published. Most of the damage was concentrated in Romania's capital, Bucharest, where about 33 large buildings collapsed. Most of those buildings were built before World War II, and were not reinforced. After the earthquake, the Romanian government imposed tougher construction standards, and started major demolition campaigns in Bucharest in 1982 until 1991.

In Bulgaria the earthquake is known as the Vrancea earthquake or Svishtov earthquake. Three blocks of flats in the Bulgarian town of Svishtov (on the Danube, opposite the Romanian town of Zimnicea) collapsed, killing more than 100 people. Other buildings damaged included the Church of the Holy Trinity. In Soviet Moldavia the earthquake also destroyed and damaged buildings; in the capital Chișinău a panic broke out.

== Damage and casualties ==
The earthquake of 4 March 1977 incurred one of the heaviest earthquake-related death tolls of the 1970s around the world. It caused the loss of 1,578 lives and injured an additional 11,221, with 90% of the fatalities being in the capital city Bucharest. The reported damage included 32,897 collapsed or demolished dwellings, 34,582 homeless families, 763 industrial units affected and many other damaged in all sectors of the economy. A 1978 World Bank report estimated a total loss of US$2.048 billion, with Bucharest accounting for 70% of the total, i.e. US$1.4 billion. According to this report, out of Romania's 40 counties, 23 were strongly affected.

Preliminary estimates of the intensity of shaking in various parts of Romania
| Intensity of shaking | Location | Epicentral distance | Focal distance^{1} |
|---|---|---|---|
| V | Brașov | 91 | 143 |
| VI | Vrâncioaia | 2 | 110 |
| VI–VII | Craiova; Galați | 288; 112 | 308; 157 |
| VII–VIII | Alexandria; Buzău; Focșani; Ploiești; Zimnicea | 234; 80; 39; 115; 268 | 259; 136; 117; 159; 290 |
| VII–IX | Bucharest | 166 | 199 |

^{1}Based on focal depth of 110 km

=== Bucharest ===
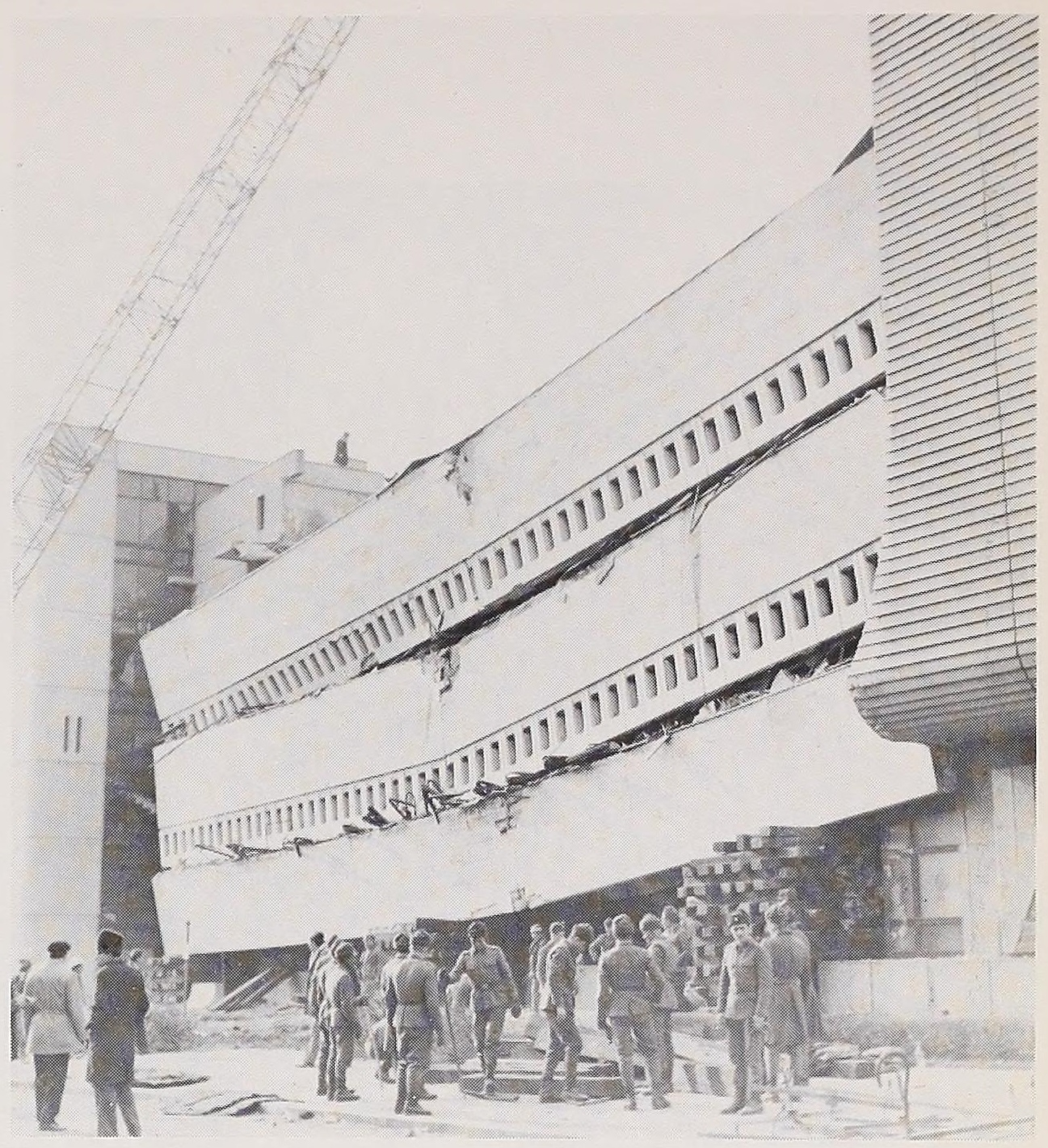
The collapsed Computer Center building

The city center saw the greatest destruction and loss of life, since the earthquake particularly affected multi-storey buildings, mostly apartment buildings. Iconic interwar structures along the Bulevardul Nicolae Bălcescu – Bulevardul Magheru axis, such as the Algiu (popularly known as Scala), Dunărea, and Casata buildings, and the nearby Continental-Colonadelor and Nestor buildings, completely or largely collapsed, while portions of others gave way. Out of the 33 multi-story buildings that collapsed, 28 were built between 1920 and 1940, a period when earthquake-resistant design was unknown. Two buildings which collapsed were built in the communist era: a building from the Lizeanu housing complex (built in 1962) had a small section of it collapse during the earthquake because a support column was cut at one of the end sections of the building (ground floor, at a store), leading to that section eventually being demolished and mostly never rebuilt, and an apartment block in Militari named OD16 and built around 1972–1975 fully collapsed due to construction defects (at the time sub-standard concrete had been found used in the said building, and air pockets were formed in the concrete during construction, and even a boot was found in the concrete). Three public buildings, the Ministry of Metallurgy, the Faculty of Chemistry, and the Computer Center also collapsed, but were not heavily staffed at the time of the earthquake. On 5 March, the first toll of the disaster indicated 508 fatalities and 2,600 injuries. A final toll showed that 90% of the victims were from Bucharest: 1,424 deaths and 7,598 injuries.

No catastrophic fires occurred, but electrical power was lost in large areas of the city for about a day. Nine of 35 hospitals were evacuated.

=== Other Romanian cities ===
In the cities of Focșani and Buzău, unreinforced masonry walls in low-rise construction collapsed partially or totally, and there were signs of movement between structural elements and adjacent masonry in-fill walls in recently constructed buildings.

The city of Zimnicea was reported to be in ruins: 175 houses collapsed, while 523 sustained serious damage, 4,000 people were displaced, and there were hundreds of victims. In as much as 80% of the city was destroyed, Zimnicea was rebuilt from the ground. In Craiova, more than 550 buildings were severely damaged, among them the Museum of Art, the Oltenia Museum, the university and the County Library. Initial estimates indicate a total of 30 dead and 300 wounded. Vaslui also suffered heavy losses, both human – seven people dead, and material.

In Ploiești around 200 homes were destroyed, and a further 2,000 were seriously damaged; the situation was also serious in Buzău County, where about 1,900 buildings were affected. In Plopeni, a Worker's Dormitory made of masonry totally collapsed, killing 30 to 60 workers and injuring many. Counties in Transylvania and Dobruja showed no serious damage.

The earthquake induced geomorphological phenomena in southern, eastern and northern Wallachia, as well as southern Moldavia. These consisted in landslides, liquefaction, settlements, water spurting; in the Vrancea Mountains, the course of the Zăbala River was partially blocked, forming a small natural dam lake.

=== Bulgaria ===
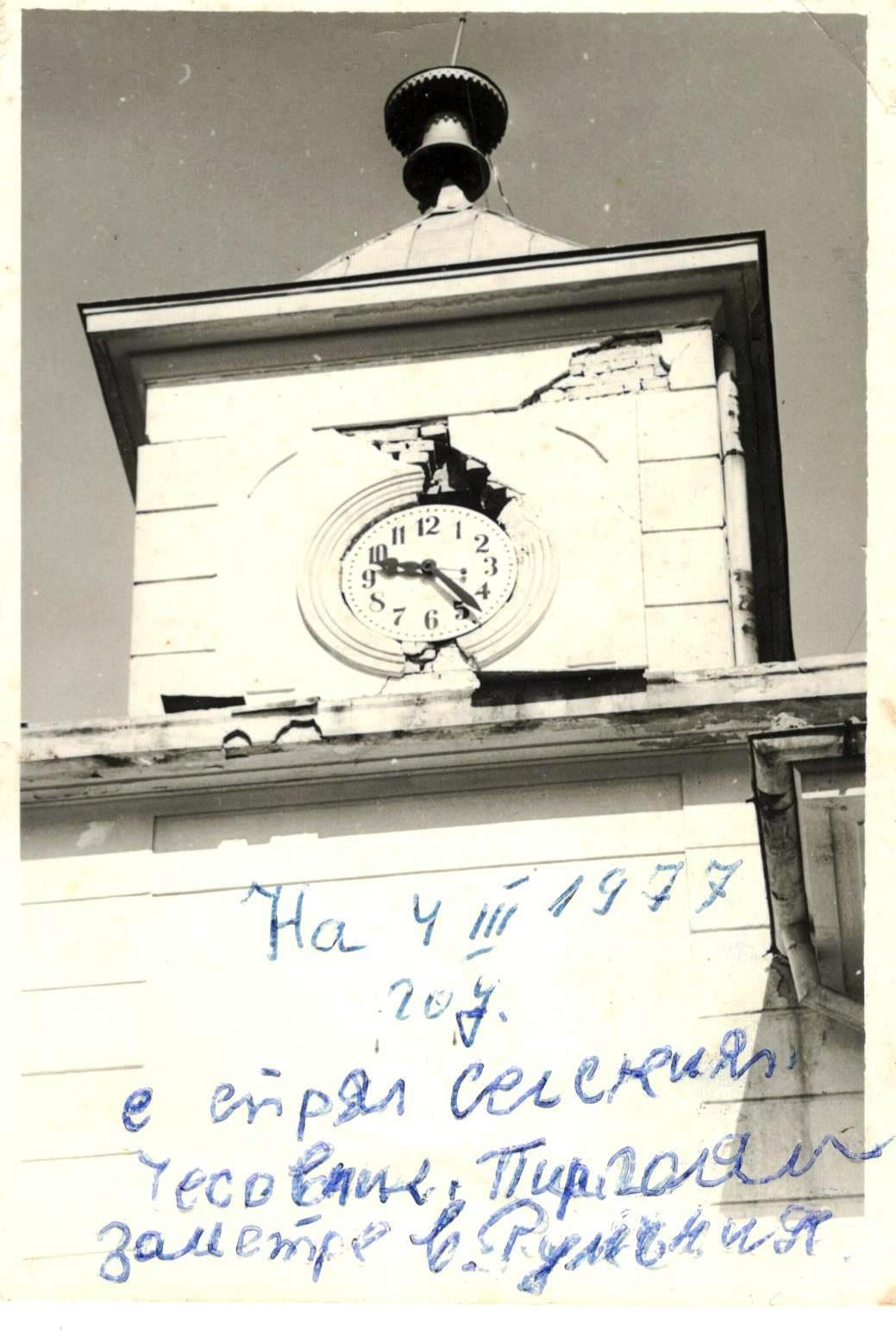
Damaged bell tower in the Bulgarian village of Yuper

The earthquake of 4 March heavily impacted Bulgaria. The city of Svishtov was the most affected. Here, three blocks of flats collapsed, killing up to 120 people, among them 27 children. Many other buildings were damaged, including the Church of the Holy Trinity. In Ruse, the tremors were strong but there was little damage; only one person perished, hit by a huge architectural ornament that fell down from a nearby building.

=== Soviet Moldova ===
According to official data, 2,765 buildings were destroyed in the Moldavian SSR, while 20,763 buildings suffered significant damage.

=== Spatial distribution of human casualties ===
| Country | County | Locality | Killed | Injured | Hospitalized (among the injured) |
|---|---|---|---|---|---|
| Bulgaria | | Svishtov | 120 | 165 | not known |
| Moldova | | | 2 | not known | not known |
| Yugoslavia | | | 0 | not known | 0 |
| Romania | Total (Romania) | | 1,578 | 11,321 | 2,369 |
| Romania | Dolj | | 41 | 315 to 562 | not known |
| Romania | Teleorman | | 20 | 204 | 67 |
| Romania | Prahova | | 15 (or >50?) | not known | not known |
| Romania | Vaslui | | 7 | 40 | not known |
| Romania | Iași | | 4 | 270 to 440 | not known |
| Romania | Brăila | | 3 | 5 | not known |
| Romania | Vrancea | | 2 | 23 | 5 |
| Romania | Buzău | | 0 | 55 | not known |
| Romania | Giurgiu | | 1 | 35 | not known |
| Romania | Other | | 61? | 2,359 to 2,776 | 797 |
| Romania | Other | Bucharest | 1,424 | 7,598 | 1,500 |
| Romania | Other | Plopeni Worker's Dormitory | 30 to 60? | many | not known |
| Romania | Other | Craiova | 30 | 500 | not known |
| Romania | Other | Vălenii de Munte | 7? | | not known |
| Romania | Other | Iași | 4 | 270 to 440 | not known |
| Romania | Other | Zimnicea | 5 | 62 | not known |
| Romania | Other | Turnu Măgurele | 4 | 70 | not known |
| Romania | Other | Roșiorii de Vede | 4 | not known | not known |
| Romania | Other | Alexandria | 3 | not known | not known |
| Romania | Other | Brăila | 3 | 5 | not known |
| Romania | Other | Giurgiu | 1 | 35 | not known |
| Romania | Other | Focșani | 1 | not known | not known |
| Romania | Other | Odobești | 1 | not known | not known |
| Romania | Other | Năruja | 0 | 1 | 1 |
| Event total | | | 1,700 | ~11,500 | ~3,942 |

== Aftershocks ==
The earthquake epicenter was located in the south-west part of Vrancea County, the most active seismic area in Romania, at a depth of about 85.3 km (53.0 mi). The shock wave was felt in almost all countries in the Balkan Peninsula, as well as the Soviet republics of Ukraine and Moldavia, albeit with a lower intensity. Seismic movement was followed by aftershocks of smaller magnitude. The strongest aftershock occurred on the morning of 5 March 1977, at 02:00 AM, at a depth of 109 km (68 mi), with a magnitude was 4.9 on the Richter scale. Other aftershocks' magnitudes did not exceed 4.3 or 4.5 M_{w}.

== Reactions of authorities ==
At the time of the earthquake, Nicolae and Elena Ceaușescu were on an official visit to Nigeria. Ceaușescu heard about the disaster in the country from a Romanian official.

Initially, news about the earthquake were confusing, and people talked about a much larger catastrophe. Due to a power failure in Bucharest, communication services were down for several hours. The population took to the streets, scared of possible aftershocks. At that moment, authorities had not taken any concrete steps.

Residents of many damaged buildings took part in ad hoc rescue efforts. Doctors, soldiers, and many civilians helped in these rescue efforts. Nine hospitals were shut down. Floreasca Emergency Hospital in Bucharest, having been seriously damaged, was overwhelmed, and subsequently evacuated. The Dinamo Stadium was turned into a triage point for the wounded. By the morning of March 5 work was underway on reestablishing basic utilities – the water, gas, and electrical grids, as well as the phone lines.

The presidential couple and the Romanian delegation in Nigeria returned to Romania during the night of 4–5 March 1977, arriving at Otopeni Airport at 8:15am. Afterwards Nicolae Ceaușescu imposed a state of emergency throughout the country. In the following days, the Head of State conducted visits to Bucharest to assess damage.

Teams of soldiers and firefighters responsible for the rescue of possible survivors received aid from the Red Cross. They were joined by the Buftea film studio stuntmen and many volunteers. Many people were rescued from the ruins, some after several days of being trapped.

== Notable victims ==
Individuals killed in the earthquake include:

- Anatol E. Baconsky, essayist, poet, novelist, publicist, literary theorist and translator
- Doina Badea, pop music singer
- Alexandru Bocăneț, film director
- Savin Bratu, editor, critic and literary historian
- Toma Caragiu, actor
- Daniela Caurea, poet
- Florin Ciorăscu, physicist and corresponding member of the Romanian Academy
- Tudor Dumitrescu, pianist and composer of classical music
- Mihai Gafița, critic, literary historian and writer
- Despina Ghinokastra Istrati, painter and illustrator
- Alexandru Ivasiuc, writer and novelist

- Mihaela Mărăcineanu, mezzo-soprano and soloist of the Romanian Opera in Bucharest
- Corina Nicolescu, curator and art historian
- Mihail Petroveanu, critic and literary historian
- Eliza Petrăchescu, actress
- Liviu Popa, architect, illustrator and scenographer
- Corneliu M. Popescu, translator
- Veronica Porumbacu, poet, writer, memoirist, author of children's literature and translator
- Ioan Siadbei, philologist and literary historian
- Tudor Stavru, sportsman and stunt performer
- Nicolae Vătămanu, doctor and photographer
- Viorica Vizante, translator
- Niculina Ceaușescu, niece of Nicolae Ceaușescu

== See also ==
- Intermediate-depth earthquake
- List of earthquakes in 1977
- List of earthquakes in Romania
- List of earthquakes in Bulgaria
- 1940 Vrancea earthquake, affecting Bucharest with a magnitude of 7.4–7.7.
- The Bulgarian film Sweet and Bitter was aired by TVR 1 and has remained linked to the earthquake in the mind of Romanians.
