= Veronica Porumbacu =

Romanian poet, prose writer and translator

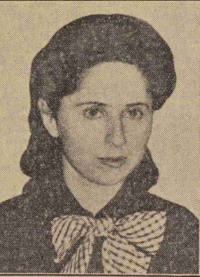

Veronica Porumbacu (pen name of Veronica Schwefelberg; October 24, 1921 – March 4, 1977) was a Romanian poet, prose writer and translator.

== Biography ==
Born into a Jewish family in Bucharest, her parents were Arnold Schwefelberg and his wife Betty (née Grünbaun). Until age seven, she was cared for by a nanny from Porumbacu de Sus village; this was the origin of her pen name. She studied at Elena Doamna High School from 1932 to 1940, during which time she became a communist activist. Upon graduating, she was unable to enroll in the University of Bucharest due to anti-Jewish laws, instead attending the private College for Jewish Students in 1943–1944. She subsequently attended the literature faculty of the University of Bucharest from 1944 to 1948. She was a schoolteacher in 1943, a reporter and editor at the Romanian Radio Broadcasting Company from 1945 to 1949, editor and then assistant editor-in-chief at Viața Românească from 1949 to 1953, assistant editor-in-chief at Gazeta literară from 1953 to 1956 and section chief at the Romanian Writers' Union from 1956 to 1964. From 1970, she taught at the Bucharest Pioneers' Palace.

Her first published work appeared in Ecoul newspaper in 1944, signed Maria Radu. She also wrote for Lumea (headed by George Călinescu), Contemporanul, Flacăra, Viața Românească, Gazeta literară, Steaua, Tribuna, Ateneu, Orizont and Luceafărul. Some of her poems, such as Baladă pentru 1 Mai (Ballad for May Day, 1949) and Către centrul de votare (Towards the Voting Center, 1952) were published in the official Communist Party newspaper, Scînteia. Her first books were La capătul lui '38 (prose) and Visele Babei Dochia (poetry), both from 1947. It was with the 1961 Diminețile simple that her work again became more personal, giving lyric touches to daily, often domestic, happenings; this tendency is apparent in her following books, from Memoria cuvintelor (1963) to Voce (1974). Bilet în circuit (1965) and Drumuri și zile (1969) are Porumbacu's accounts of travel, both domestically and abroad. She wrote two memoirs, Porțile (1968) and Voce și val (1976), as well as poetry for children. Her translations include works by Friedrich Schiller, Jean Racine, Louise Labé, Emily Dickinson, Rafael Alberti, Miklós Radnóti, Attila József and contemporary Nordic poets.

Her husband was literary critic Mihail Petroveanu; the couple died in the 1977 Vrancea earthquake.

== Bibliography ==
- Visele Babei Dochia. Forum. 1947.
- Anii aceștia. Editura De Stat Pentru Literatură și Artă a Uniunii Scriitorilor din R.P.R. 1950.
- Mărturii. Editura De Stat Pentru Literatură și Artă. 1951.
- Note din R.P. Ungară. Editura De Stat Pentru Literatură și Artă. 1952.
- Prietenii mei. Editura De Stat Pentru Literatură și Artă. 1953.
- Ilie Pintilie. Editura Tineretului. 1953.
- Fata apelor. Editura Tineretului. 1954.
- Generația mea. Editura De Stat Pentru Literatură și Artă. 1955.
- Lirice. Editura pentru literatură. 1957.
- Întreg și parte. Editura De Stat Pentru Literatură și Artă. 1959.
- Pagini din Coreea. Editura De Stat Pentru Literatură și Artă. 1960.
- Din lumea noastră. Editura Tineretului. 1960.
- Din lirica feminină. Editura De Stat Pentru Literatură și Artă. 1960.
- Diminețile simple. Editura pentru literatură. 1961.
- Poezii. Editura Tineretului. 1962.
- Memoria cuvintelor. Editura pentru literatură. 1963.
- Întoarcerea din Cythera. Editura Tineretului. 1966.
- Histriana. Editura Tineretului. 1967.
- Porțile. Editura pentru literatură. 1968.
- Drumuri și zile. Editura Tineretului. 1969.
- Mineralia. Editura Eminescu. 1970.
- Ferestre deschise. Editura Ion Creangă. 1971.
- Cercul și Anamaria. Editura Ion Creangă. 1974.
- Legende la niște portrete. Editura Eminescu. 1974.
- Voce și val. Cartea Românească. 1976.
- Versuri. Cartea Românească. 1977.
