= George Bacovia =

Romanian symbolist poet (1981 - 1957)

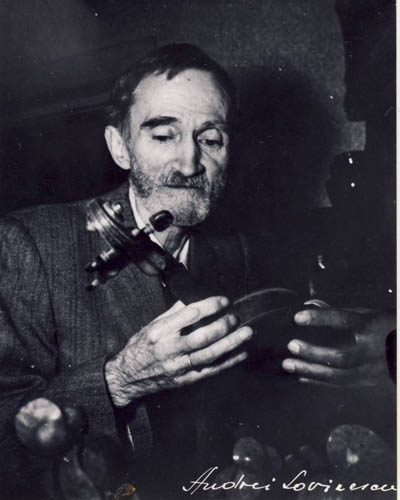
- Born: George Andone Vasiliu; 17 September 1881; Bacău, Kingdom of Romania
- Died: 22 May 1957 (aged 75); Bucharest, Romanian People's Republic
- Resting place: Bellu Cemetery, Bucharest
- Education: University of Bucharest, Ferdinand I National College
- Occupations: Poet; writer
- Writing career
- Language: Romanian
- Notable work: Plumb
- Movement: symbolism

George Bacovia (Romanian pronunciation: [ˈdʒe̯ordʒe baˈkovi.a]; the pen name of Gheorghe Vasiliu [ˈɡe̯orɡe vasiˈli.u]; 17 September [O.S. 5 September] 1881 – 22 May 1957) was a Romanian symbolist poet. While he initially belonged to the local Symbolist movement, launched as a poet by Alexandru Macedonski with the poem and poetry collection Plumb ("Lead"), his poetry came to be seen as a precursor of Romanian Modernism and eventually established him in critical esteem alongside Lucian Blaga, Tudor Arghezi, Ion Pillat, Ion Barbu, and Octavian Goga as one of the most important interwar Romanian poets. In the 1950s, he wrote the poem "Cogito", which is his poetical testament.

== Biography ==
=== Childhood ===
Bacovia was born Gheorghe Vasiliu in Bacău, the son of a merchant, Dimitrie Vasiliu, and his wife Zoe "Zoița" Vasiliu (born Langa). At only six years of age he began his study of German. Between 1889 and 1890 he started his schooling at an academy in Bacău, before registering in 1891 at the "Domnească" Primary School in the same city. In June 1893, he finished his primary schooling and afterward began studies at the Ferdinand Gymnasium, also in Bacău. One autumn night, an oversight by the sexton led to his being locked overnight in the tower of the Precista church, an experience which would later inspire his first major poem, 1899's Amurg violet (Purple Twilight). He exhibited a talent for drawing and developed into an excellent violinist in the school orchestra, which he directed. He also distinguished himself in gymnastics.

In 1899, he received the national first prize in the contest "Tinerimii române" for "artistic drawings of nature". His poem Și toate – written a year earlier under the name of "V. George" – was published in the magazine Literatorul on 30 March, launching his literary career.

=== Studies ===
In 1900, Bacovia matriculated at the Military Academy in Iași, but dropped out during his second semester, unable to bear military discipline. In 1901 he began studies at the Liceul Ferdinand in Bacău, from which he graduated in 1903. He wrote the poem Liceu (High School) in response to a Ministry of Education questionnaire sent to graduates in the course of Spiru Haret's educational reforms. He matriculated at the Faculty of Law in Bucharest and soon became a fixture in the city's literary life; an early reading of his poem Plumb (Lead) at Alexandru Macedonski's salon produced a powerful impression.

He continued reading his poems at Macedonski's salon, and in 1904 his Nervi de toamnă (Autumn nerves) obtained the same success. Helped by his growing reputation, he gained a position at the review Arta de la Iași and was able to stop his law studies. After two years in Bucharest with his brother Eugen, he returned to Bacău before matriculating at the University of Iași's Faculty of Law; despite his previous studies in Bucharest, he started as a first-year student. Until 1909 he remained in Iași, assisting I. M. Rascu with his review Versuri, later Versuri și proză. Between 1909 and 1910 he came to Iași for examinations but lived in Bacău; on obtaining his law degree in 1911, he qualified for the bar in Bacău, but despite paying dues for ten years, never practiced law. Instead, he spent his time working with Constantin Al. Ionescu-Caion on the Românul Literar, with other figures on Flacăra, working as a copyist at the Prefecture, and helping at the Prefectural accounting office. In 1913–1914, his health deteriorated and he was eventually forced to relinquish his post.

=== Between the wars ===
In 1914, Bacovia was interned at the sanitorium of Dr. Mărgăritescu in Bucharest, from where he published poems in the literary supplement of the newspaper Seara and sent Plumb out for publication. In 1915, after leaving Bucharest, he became co-editor of the review Orizonturi noi and continued to publish poetry, prose and book reviews under a multitude of pseudonyms. He rekindled his friendship with Macedonski.

In 1916, he became a secretary at the Directory of Secondary and Superior Education in the Ministry of Instruction, and was in Bucharest when Plumb first appeared in July. In August, Romania entered World War I on the side of the Allies. In October, the vagaries of war forced him to flee the threatened Bucharest to Iași with the archives of his department.

Bacovia returned to Bucharest in 1917, resuming his post as a functionary. In 1920, he became a Chief of Office, Third Class, in the Ministry of Labor; in 1921 he was promoted to Chief of Office, First Class in the same ministry. However, he immediately fell ill with a lung condition and was forced to resign before returning, a year later, to Bacău.

In 1924, the second edition of Plumb was published in Râmnicu Sărat. Meanwhile, Bacovia found work as a teacher of drawing and calligraphy at the Boys' Commercial School in Bacău. By 1925, however, he had become the primary director of the review Ateneu cultural, and published his book of poetry Scântei galbene (Yellow sparks) at his own expense. In the same year Bucăți de noapte (Night fragments) appeared in an edition edited by the poet Agatha Grigorescu. In 1926 he returned to the Boys' Commercial School and continued to teach drawing and calligraphy.

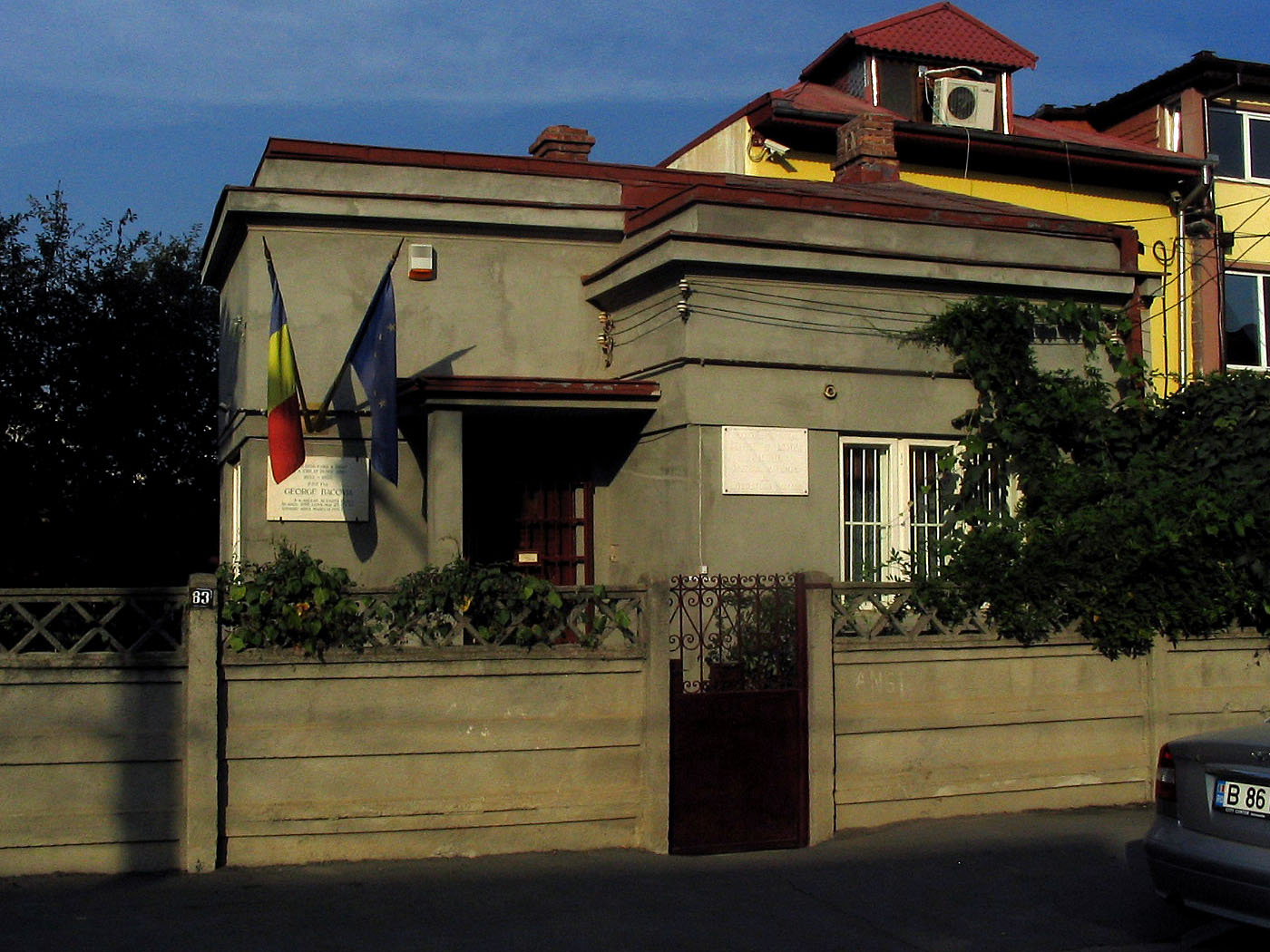
House of George and Agatha Bacovia in Bucharest, today a museum

In 1928, Bacovia married Agatha Grigorescu, editor of Bucăți de noapte, and settled in Bucharest, where his wife was a teacher. In 1929, he republished Plumb and Scântei galbene in a single edition, entitled Poezii and produced by Editura Ancora; soon after, the dormant review Orizonturi noi resumed publication under his direction. He gained a post as an inspector at the Ministry of Popular Education, but after the publication of his collection Cu voi (With you), he returned with his wife to Bacău, where he spent three years unemployed. In 1931, Agatha gave birth to Bacovia's only son, Gabriel; in 1932, the Romanian Society of Writers approved a monthly pension of 1,000 lei.

The family returned to Bucharest permanently in 1933, never to move away again. In 1934, Bacovia published an anthology of his poems entitled Poezii; in 1940, his pension increased to 2,000 lei per month. He then founded the House of Pensions for Writers, from which he subsequently drew a 10,000 lei monthly pension. In 1944 his Opere (Works) appeared, a collection including all of his previously published works.

=== After the war ===
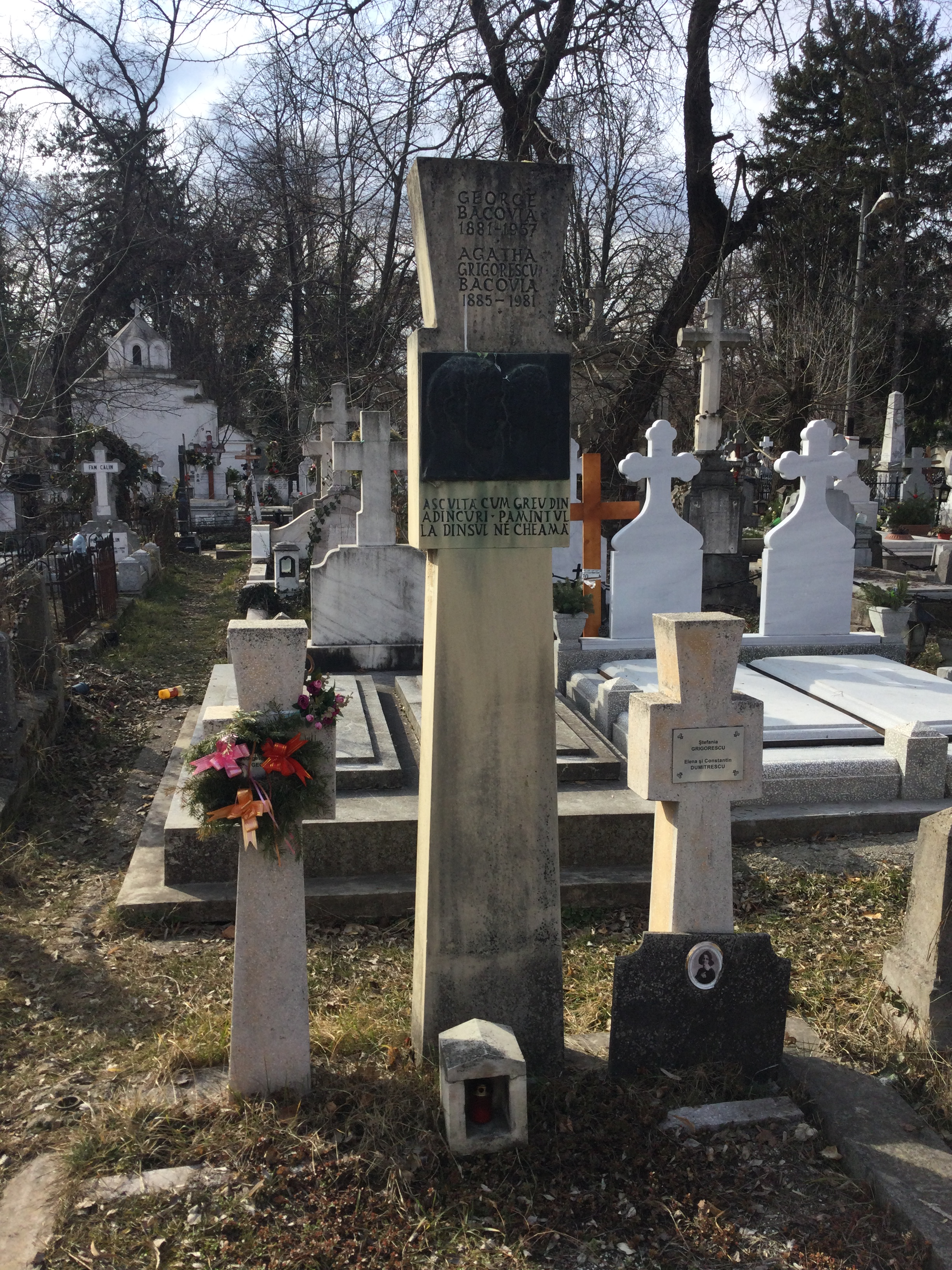
Grave at Bellu Cemetery

In 1945 Bacovia was named librarian of the Ministry of Mines and Oil. He continued to write, and in 1946 published the volume Stanțe burgheze (literally translated into English Bourgeois Stanzas), which led to his hiring by the Ministry of the Arts. In 1956 he published his final volume of Poezii before dying on the afternoon of 22 May 1957 in his Bucharest residence.

== Critical reception ==
Literary critics initially classified Bacovia as a Symbolist, but later criticism has argued that he transcended his milieu to form a part of modern Romanian poetry. Even if his first volume of poetry, Plumb (1916), was heavily marked by the influence of the Symbolists, his subsequent volumes, such as Scântei galbene, show his discovery of a more modern poetic concept, closer to the prose-poem than to the classic verse forms of the 19th century. Interwar critics saw in Bacovia either a Neosymbolist (George Călinescu) or a minor poet with insufficient material (Eugen Lovinescu). Just after World War II, however, Bacovia's poetry began to be linked to newer currents of thought, being linked with and compared to the theatre of the absurd (Mihail Petroveanu), poetic modernism, surrealism, automatic writing, imagism, expressionism, and even philosophic movements like existentialism (Ion Caraion). Bacovia thus succeeded in becoming recognized as one of the most important Romanian poets, an author who executed a vast canonical leap from minor poet to enduring classic of Romanian literature.

Gymnasiums in Bacău and Bucharest bear his name. Streets are named after him in Bacău, Brașov, Bucharest, Cluj-Napoca, Timișoara, and Voluntari. The house in Bucharest where the poet lived between 1933 and 1957 (located at 63, George Bacovia Street) is now a memorial house.

== Selected critical bibliography ==
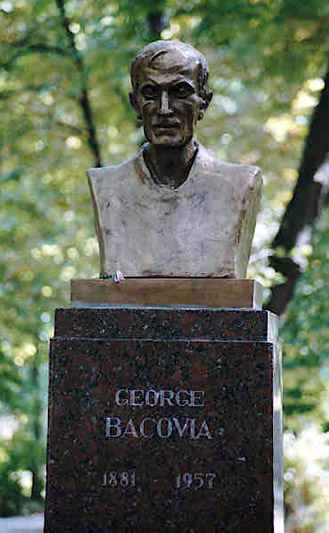
Bust of George Bacovia by Milița Petrașcu in Chișinău

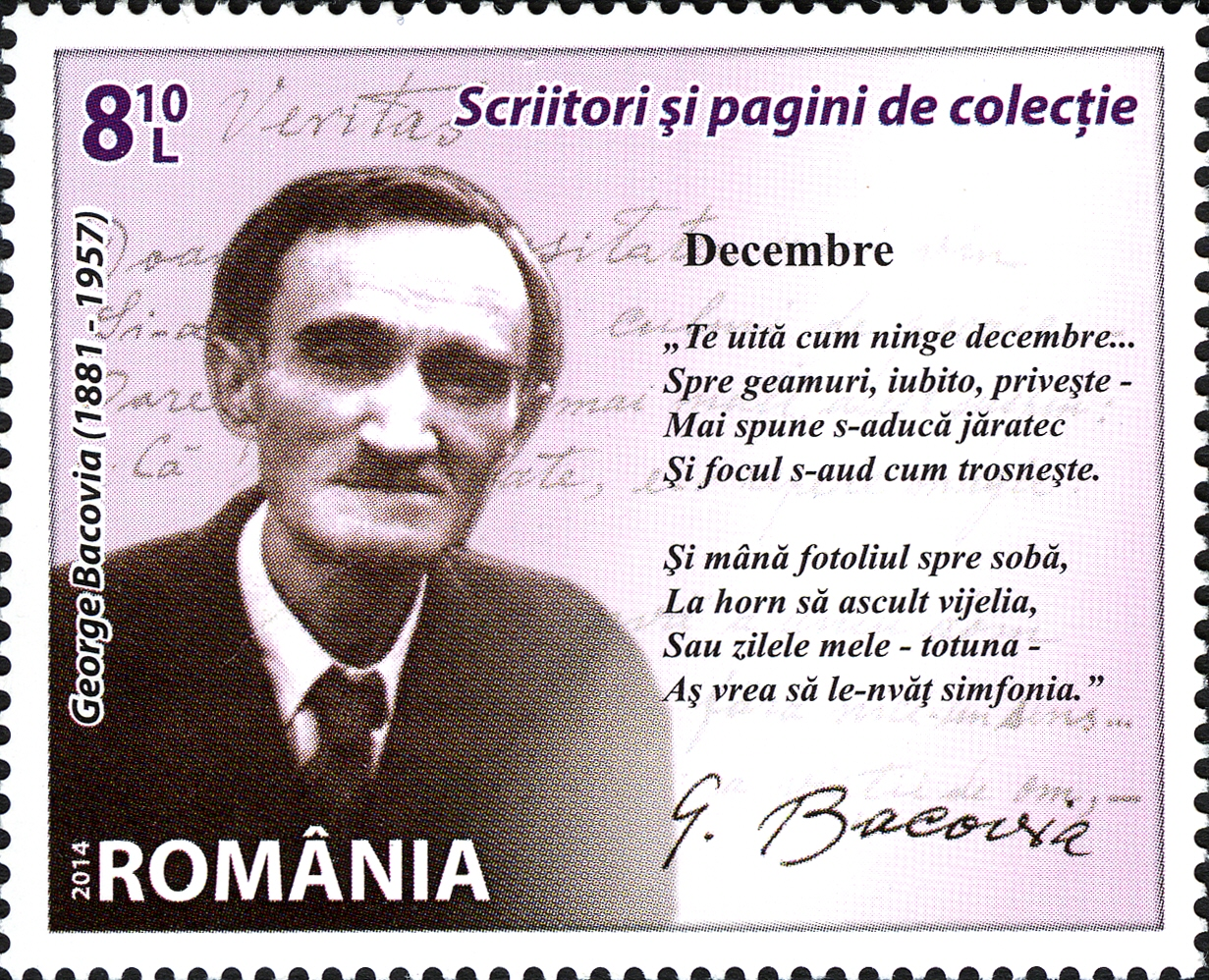
Poșta Română stamp from 2014

- Agatha Grigorescu-Bacovia, Bacovia (viața poetului), Bucharest, Editura pentru Literatură, 1962.
- Mihail Petroveanu, George Bacovia, Bucharest, Editura pentru Literatură, 1969.
- Gheorghe Grigurcu, Bacovia, un antisentimental, Bucharest, Editura Albatros, 1974.
- Ion Caraion, Bacovia. Sfârșitul continuu, Bucharest, Editura Eminescu, 1975; Second Edition, Bucharest, Editura Cartea Românească, 1979.
- Dinu Flamând, Introducere în opera lui G. Bacovia, Bucharest, Editura Minerva, 1979.
- Daniel Dimitriu, Bacovia, Iași, Editura Junimea, 1981.
- Alexandra Indrieș, Alternative bacoviene, Bucharest, Editura Minerva, 1984.
- Mircea Scarlat, George Bacovia – nuanțări, Bucharest, Editura Cartea Românească, 1987.
- Vasile Fanache, Bacovia. Ruptura de utopia romantică, Cluj, Editura Dacia, 1994 (reed. 2000).
- Radu Petrescu, G. Bacovia, Pitești, Editura Paralela 45, 1999 (reed. 2002).
- Ion Bogdan Lefter, Bacovia – un model al tranziției, Pitești, Editura Paralela 45, 2001.
- Constantin Trandafir, Poezia lui Bacovia, Bucharest, Saeculum, 2001.
- Mihai Cimpoi, Secolul Bacovia, Bucharest, Editura Fundației Culturale Ideea Europeană, 2005.
- Dicționarul scriitorilor români, coordonatori Mircea Zaciu, Marian Papahagi, Aurel Sasu, A-C, Bucharest, Editura Fundației Culturale Române, 1995.
- Dicționarul esențial al scriitorilor români, Bucharest, Editura Albatros, 2000.
- Dicționarul general al literaturii române, coordinator general Eugen Simion, A-B, Bucharest, Editura Univers Enciclopedic, 2004.
