= Modest Morariu =

Romanian poet, essayist, prose writer and translator (1929–1988)

Modest Morariu (Romanian pronunciation: [modest moraˈri.u]; August 11, 1929 – April 15, 1988) was a poet, essayist, prose writer and translator from Romania.

Morariu was born in Cernăuți. He was a director of the Meridiane publishing house, and translated, amongst others, works by André Malraux, Emil Cioran and Albert Camus into Romanian.

== Books ==
=== Poems ===
- Povestire cu fantome, 1968
- Spectacolul de pantomimă, 1971
- Ovăzul sălbatic, 1974

=== Novel ===
- Întoarcerea lui Ulise, 1982

=== Essays ===
- Între relativ şi absolut, 1979
- Itinerarii, 1987

=== Fine arts albums ===
- Ion Gheorghiu, 1966
- Florin Pucă, 1974
- Rousseau le Douanier, 1975
- Goya-capricii, 1974
- Toulouse-Lautrec, 1980
