= Cezar Baltag =

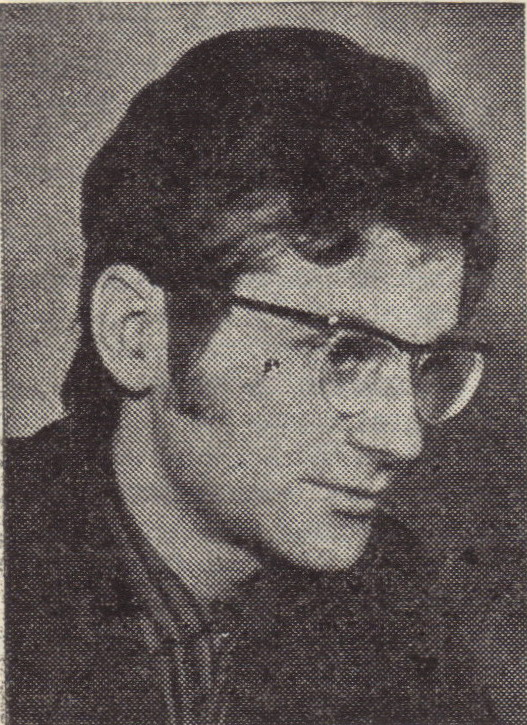
Baltag c. 1978

Cezar Baltag (Romanian pronunciation: [ˈt͡ʃezar balˈtaɡ]; 26 July 1939 – 26 May 1997) was a Romanian poet.

He was born in Mălinești, at the time in Hotin County, Kingdom of Romania, now Malynivka, Chernivtsi Oblast, Ukraine, the son of the priest Porfirie Baltag and of Margareta Baltag (née Alexandrescu). After completing high school in Pitești in 1955, he studied at the Philology Faculty of the University of Bucharest, graduating in 1960.

He died in Bucharest in 1997. A street in Cluj-Napoca is named after him.

== Selected works ==
- Comuna de aur, Bucharest: E.S.P.L.A., 1960, OCLC 43768793
- Vis planetar, Bucharest: Editura pentru Literatură, 1964, OCLC 248718461
- Răsfrîngeri, Bucharest: Editura pentru Literatură, 1966, OCLC 1336876536
- Monada, Bucharest: Editura pentru Literatură, 1968, OCLC 58872000
- Odihnă în țipăt, Bucharest: Editura Tineretului, 1969, OCLC 25242553
- Șah orb, Bucharest: Editura Eminescu, 1971, OCLC 935372743
- Madona din dud (1973)
- Unicorn în oglindă (1975)
- Poeme (1981)
- Dialog la mal (1985)
- Euridice și umbra (1988)
- Chemarea numelui (1995)
- Ochii tăcerii (1996)
