= Mircea Ivănescu =

Romanian poet, writer and translator

Mircea Ivănescu (Romanian pronunciation: [ˈmirtʃe̯a ivəˈnesku]; March 26, 1931 – July 21, 2011) was a Romanian poet, writer and translator, and a forerunner of Romanian postmodernism, which was characteristic of the 1980s. His translations from global literature into Romanian include James Joyce, Franz Kafka, and F. Scott Fitzgerald.

== Background ==
Prolific poet, debuting with Lines in 1968, Ivănescu has published almost every two years a new volume during four decades. His lyrics, often depicting a day-to-day I disguised as "mopete" (an anagram of "poet" and "poem" it was thought, but the poet himself denied it in an interview), has rehabilitated narrativity in Romanian poetry in the seventies, echoing American post-war major poets. He won the Mihai Eminescu Poetry Prize (1998) and was proposed by Romanian Professional Writers Association for Nobel Prize in 1999.

== Poetry collections ==
- Versuri (EPL, 1968)
- Poeme (Eminescu, 1970)
- Poesii (Cartea Românească, 1970)
- Alte versuri (Eminescu, 1972)
- Poem (Cartea Românească, 1973)
- Alte poeme (Albatros, 1973)
- Amintiri (Cartea Românească, 1973)
- Alte poesii (Dacia, 1976)
- Poesii nouă (Dacia, 1982)
- Poeme nouă (Cartea Românească, 1983)
- Alte poeme nouă (Cartea Românească 1986)
- Versuri vechi, nouă (Eminescu, 1988)
- Poeme alese (1966–1989)
- Poeme vechi, nouă (Cartea Românească, 1989)
- Versuri (Eminescu, 1996)
- Poezii (Vitruviu, 1997)
- Poesii vechi şi nouă, antologie (Minerva, 1999)
