= Alexandru Ivasiuc =

Romanian novelist (1933–1977)

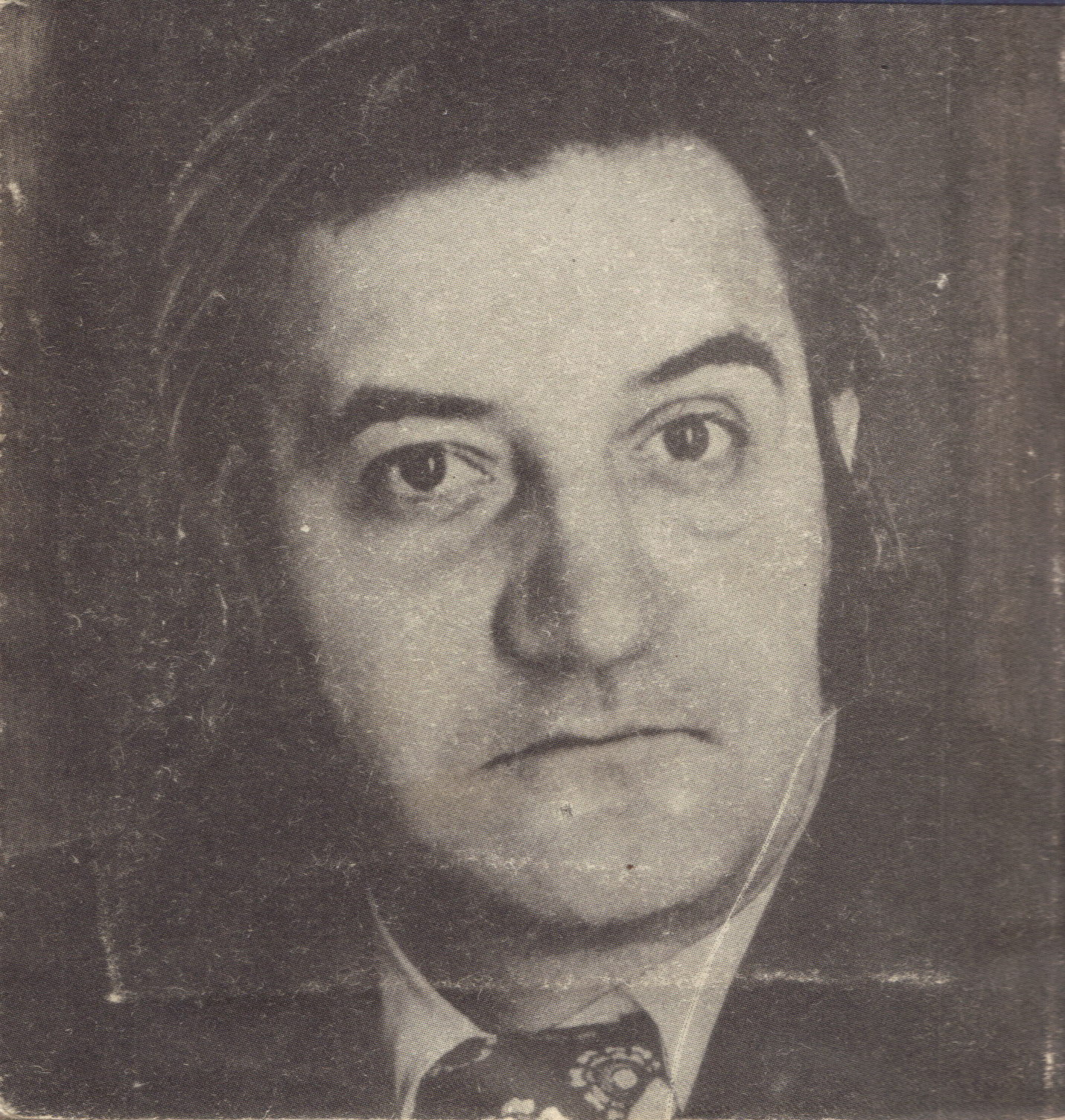
Alexandru Ivasiuc

Alexandru "Sașa" Ivasiuc (Romanian pronunciation: [alekˈsandru (ˈsaʃa) ivaˈsjuk]; July 12, 1933 – March 4, 1977) was a Romanian novelist.

== Life ==
He was born in Sighet, the son of a science teacher. After the Second Vienna Award of 30 August 1940, the family fled to Bucharest, only returning to Sighet in 1951. After graduation from high school he entered the Faculty of Philosophy in Bucharest, but he was expelled after two years of study for ideological reasons.

After the expulsion, Ivasiuc entered the Faculty of Medicine of the Institute of Medical and Pharmaceutical Sciences in Bucharest. During his fourth year he participated in the student protest movements of 1956. He was among the organizers of a solidarity rally in University Square, scheduled for 15 November 1956. He was arrested on 4 November 1956, and by decision No. 481 of 1 April 1957 the Bucharest Military Tribunal sentenced him to five years' imprisonment. On his return from the labour camp he was placed under house arrest for a period of two years in Brăila County.

In 1963, Ivasiuc returned to Bucharest where he worked briefly at a pharmaceutical factory and married the journalist Tita Chiper. He worked at the US Embassy until 1968, first as a film projector operator and later as a reviewer of Romanian literary magazines.

In 1968, the year when he became a Communist Party member, Ivasiuc received a scholarship from the International Writing Program of the University of Iowa and spent there half a year together with his wife, and gave a series of lectures at Columbia and at Berkeley; he also travelled to Oxford, England.

In 1970, he became editorial director at the Cartea Românească publishing house and secretary of the Romanian Writers' Union. Between 1972 and 1974 he was director of "Casa de Filme nr. 1", a state-owned movie production company.

Although he had been imprisoned for political reasons, he was allowed by the Romanian Communist authorities to study in the United States and to hold a series of high-level jobs after he was released, so Paul Goma accuses him of having been an informer for the secret police, the Securitate. Others, like Vladimir Tismaneanu, are not sure whether he was an informer, while again others, like Nicolae Manolescu, refute the accusations that Ivasiuc was an informer.

He is mentioned in W. D. Snodgrass's After-Images (1999).

He died in the 1977 Vrancea earthquake in Bucharest, and was buried in the Străulești cemetery.

== Works ==
- Vestibul ("Vestibule", 1967), for which he was awarded the Romanian Writers' Union Prize
- Corn de vânătoare ("Hunting Horn", 1972)
- Interval (1973)
- Apa ("The Water", 1973)
- Păsările ("The Birds", 1973)
- Cunoaşterea de noapte ("The Knowledge of Night", 1973)
- Iluminări ("Illuminations", 1976)
- Racul ("The Cancer", 1976)

== Bibliography ==
- Ion Bogdan Lefter, Păsările, Albatros, Bucharest, 1986
