= Contemporanul =

Romanian literary magazine (1881–1891)

Contemporanul (The Contemporary) was a Romanian literary magazine published in Iaşi, Romania, from 1881 to 1891. It was sponsored by the socialist circle of the city.

A new magazine Contimporanul was published in the 1920s, claiming to continue the tradition of the former newspaper, without having the same political orientation towards Marxism.

A new series of the magazine was published in 1946 and continues till present.
