= Florin (name) =

Florin is derived via intermediary forms from Latin floris meaning flower.

The feminine form is Florina. The Italian equivalent is Fiorino, feminine Fiorina.

== People named Florin ==
Adopted name:

- Saint Florin (Florinus of Remüs, died 856 AD), 7th-century saint

Surname

- Carl Rudolf Florin (1894–1965), Swedish botanist
- Elfriede Florin (1912–2006), German actress
- Peter Florin (1921–2014), East German politician and diplomat
- Wilhelm Florin (1894–1944), German politician

Given name

- Florin Bonca
- Florin Bratu
- Florin Buhuceanu
- Florin Călinescu
- Florin Cernat
- Florin Constantiniu
- Florin Corodeanu
- Florin Gheorghiu
- Florin Gardoș
- Florin Halagian
- Florin Hilbay
- Florin Krasniqi
- Florin Lovin
- Florin Marin
- Florin Mergea
- Florin Georgian Mironcic
- Florin Mugur
- Florin Pavlovici
- Florin Piersic
- Florin Popescu
- Florin Prunea
- Florin Pucă
- Florin Răducioiu
- Florin Salam
- Florin Segărceanu
- Florin Vlaicu

== See also ==
- Florian (disambiguation)
- Florinus (disambiguation)
- Florence (name)
- Florina (disambiguation)
