= Language and the euro =

Several linguistic issues have arisen in relation to the spelling of the words euro and cent in the many languages of the member states of the European Union, as well as in relation to grammar and the formation of plurals.

In official documents, the name "euro" must be used for the nominative singular in all languages, though different alphabets are taken into account and plural forms and declensions are accepted. In documents other than EU legal texts, including national legislation, other spellings are accepted according to the various grammatical rules of the respective language. For European Union legislation, the spelling of the words for the currency is prescribed for each language; in the English-language version of European Union legislation the forms "euro" and "cent" are used invariantly in the singular and plural, even though this departs from usual English practice for currencies.

== Written conventions for the euro in the languages of EU member states ==
Euro conventions
€ (Note: The language is not only an official language in a eurozone member state, but has also been accepted as an official language for use in EU institutions, meaning there are official spellings in EU documents and on EU websites. Some languages may be official in their eurozone member state but have not been accepted as official in the EU. This is the case for Turkish, an official language in Cyprus but not an official language in EU institutions, and for Luxembourgish, an official language in Luxembourg but also not an official language in EU institutions. Also included in this table are some languages which are official only at the sub-national level (Basque, Catalan, and Galician in Spain).)	Language	Amount notation (€ usage)	Euro		Eurocent		Pronunciations (in IPA)	
	Basque	6,00 €	euro	6 euro	zentimoa	6 zentimo	[ˈew.ɾo]	ˈs̻entimoa ˈs̻entimo
	Bulgarian	6,00 €	евро	6 евро	цент евроцент стотинка	6 цента 6 евроцента 6 стотинки	[ˈɛ.vro] [ɛ.ˈvɾɔ]	ˈtsɛnt ˈɛ.vro.tsɛnt sto.'tiŋ.kɐ
	Catalan	6,00 €	euro	6 euros	cèntim	10 cèntims	[ˈɛw.ɾu] [ˈɛw.ɾo] [ˈew.ɾo]	ˈsɛn.tim
	Croatian	6,00 €	euro	euri 10 eura x1, xx1 euro but x11, xx11 eura	cent eurocent	10 centi x1 cent but x11 centi (x)2, (x)3, (x)4 centa but(x)12, (x)13, (x)14 centi (Note: In most Slavic languages numerals are sometimes followed by the genitive case instead of the nominative.)	[ˈeuro]	ˈtsent
	Czech	6,00 €	euro	2, 3, 4 eura 5 eur	cent	2, 3, 4, centy 5 centů	[ˈɛu.ro]	tsɛnt
	Danish	6,00 €	euro	6 euro	cent	6 cent	[ˈœʊ̯.ʁo] [ˈeʊ̯.ʁo] [ˈʌj.ʁo]	sɛnˀd̥
	Dutch	€ 6,00 (BE, NL)	euro	6 euro	cent	6 cent	[ˈøːroː] [ˈʏːroː]	sɛnt
	English	€6.00 (IE, MT); 6,00 € (EU)	euro	6 euro	cent	10 cent	/ˈjʊroʊ/;	sɛnt
	Estonian	6,00 €	euro	1 euro 6 eurot (Note: Partitive singular. Most languages use a plural or immutable singular with numbers, but Estonian and Finnish use the partitive case.)	sent	1 sent 6 senti	[ˈeu̯ro] [ˈeu̯rot]	ˈsent ˈsenti
	Finnish	6,00 €	euro	6 euroa	sentti	10 senttiä	[ˈeu̯ro] [ˈeu̯.ro.ɑ]	ˈsentːi ˈsentːi.æ
	French	6,00 €	euro	6 euros	centime	10 centimes	[øˈʁo]	sɑ̃ˈtim
	Galician	6,00 €	euro	6 euros	céntimo	6 céntimos	[ˈew.ɾɔ(s)] [ˈew.ɾ[o ~ ʊ](s)]	ˈθɛntimo(s) ˈsɛntimo(s)
	German	6,00 € (BE, DE) € 6,00 (AT)	Euro	6 Euro	Cent	6 Cent	[ˈɔʏʁo]	tsɛnt sɛnt
	Greek	6,00 € (GR, CY)	ευρώ	6 ευρώ	λεπτό (GR) σεντ (CY)	10 λεπτά 10 σεντ	[evˈro]	lepˈto / lepˈta sent
	Hungarian	6,00 €	euró	6 euró	cent	6 cent	[ˈɛuroː]	ˈtsɛnt
	Irish	€ 6.00	euro	6 euro	cent	6 cent	[jʊɹoʊ]	sɛnt
	Italian	6,00 €	euro	6 euro	centesimo	6 centesimi	[ˈɛuro]	tʃenˈteːzimo
	Latvian	6,00 €	eiro	6 eiro	cents	1 cents 6 centi 10 centu 21 cents	[ˈɛirɔː]	tsents
	Lithuanian	6,00 €	euras	1 euras 6 eurai 10 eurų 21 euras	centas	6 centai 10 centų 21 centas	[ˈɛʊrɐs]	ˈt͡sʲɛntɐs
	Luxembourgish	€ 6,00	Euro	6 Euro	Centime	6 Centimen	[ˈoɪ̯ʀoː]	ˈsɑ̃ːtim ˈsɑ̃ːtimən
	Maltese	€ 6.00	ewro	6 ewro	ċenteżmu	6 ċenteżmi 11 to 19-il ċenteżmu from 20 onwards ċenteżmu	[ˈɛʊ̯rɔ]	tʃenˈtɛzmu
	Polish	6,00 €	euro	6 euro	cent	6 centów x2, x3, x4 centy except x12, x13, x14 centów	[ˈɛw.rɔ]	tsɛnt ˈtsɛn.tɨ tsɛn.tuf
	Portuguese	6,00 €	euro	6 euros	cêntimo	6 cêntimos	[ˈew.ɾɔ(ʃ)] [ˈew.ɾu(ʃ)]	ˈsẽtimu(ʃ) ˈsẽtavu(ʃ)
	Romanian	6,00 €	euro	6 euro	cent eurocent	6 cenți 10 eurocenți	[ˈe.uro]	t͡ʃent, ˌe.uroˈt͡ʃent t͡ʃent͡sʲ, ˌe.uroˈt͡ʃent͡sʲ
	Slovak	6,00 €	euro	1 euro 2, 3, 4 eurá 5, 6, 7... eur	cent	2, 3, 4 centy 5 centov	[ɛʊ.ɾɔ]	tsɛnt
	Slovene	6,00 €	evro	1 evro 2 evra 3, 4 evri 5+ evrov	cent	1 cent 2 centa 3, 4 centi 5+ centov	[ˈeu̯.rɔ] [ˈeu̯.ra] [ˈeu̯.ri] [ˈeu̯.rɔu̯]	tsɛnt ˈtsɛn.ta ˈtsɛn.ti ˈtsɛn.tɔu̯
	Spanish	6,00 €	euro	6 euros	céntimo	6 céntimos	[eu.ɾo(s)]	ˈθent̪imo(s) ˈsent̪imo(s)
	Swedish	6,00 €	euro	6 euro	cent	6 cent	[ˈɛu.ɾo] (FI) [ˈɛv.ɾʊ], [ˈɛu.ɾo] (SE)	sent (FI) sɛnt (SE)
	Turkish	€ 6,00	avro	6 avro	sent	6 sent	['avɾo]	sænt

== Languages of the European Union ==
=== Bulgarian ===
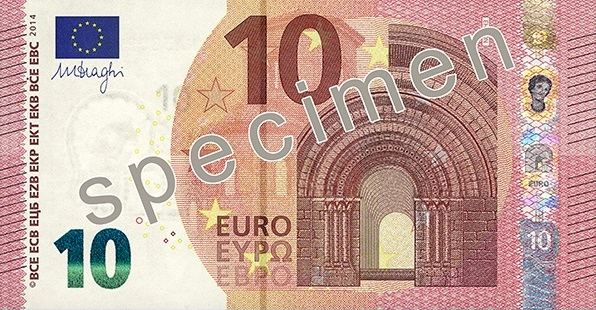
10 euro note from the Europa series, with the name of the currency written in the Latin (EURO), Greek (ΕΥΡΩ) and Cyrillic (ЕВРО) alphabets. Cyrillic was added following Bulgaria's accession to the European Union in 2007.

Bulgarian is written in the Cyrillic alphabet. The first series of euro banknotes displayed the word euro only in the Latin and Greek alphabets. Following Bulgaria's accession to the European Union in 2007, the Europa series added the Cyrillic spelling ЕВРО. Bulgarian euro coins, introduced in 2026, likewise bear ЕВРО on their national (obverse) side.

In Bulgarian, the currency is normally called евро [ˈɛvro], and less commonly [ɛvˈrɔ], from Европа [ɛvˈrɔpɐ] ("Europe"). The standard plural is also евро, with the word remaining uninflected, although the colloquial plural евра [ɛvˈra] is also used. The definite form is еврото ("the euro").

The euro cent is commonly referred to in Bulgarian as цент [ˈt͡sɛnt], while the full formal term is евроцент [ˈɛvrot͡sɛnt]. The traditional term стотинка [stoˈtiŋkɐ], plural стотинки [stoˈtiŋki], may also be used. Unlike евро, both цент and евроцент are fully inflected. For евроцент, the definite form is евроцентът, the plural is евроцентове, and the numerative form used after numerals is евроцента, as in 2 евроцента.

The traditional term stotinka (стотинка), plural stotinki (стотинки), may also be used for euro cents and appears on the national side of Bulgarian euro coins. The term has been used for Bulgarian fractional currency units since the 19th century and was also the name of one hundredth of a lev. It derives from сто (sto, "hundred"), paralleling the derivation of cent from Latin centum ("hundred").

Before Bulgaria's accession to the European Union, the ECB and the European Commission initially favoured the spelling ЕУРО for the Bulgarian name of the currency, arguing for a standardized form across the EU. Bulgaria maintained that ЕВРО should be retained to reflect Bulgarian phonetic orthography and the established pronunciation of the word.

The dispute was resolved in Bulgaria's favour at the 2007 EU Summit in Lisbon, allowing the Cyrillic spelling евро to be used in official EU documents. Since 13 December 2007, EU institutions, including the ECB, have used евро as the official Bulgarian spelling of the single European currency.

Among other Slavic languages written in Cyrillic, Macedonian, Russian and Serbian also use the spelling евро.

=== Croatian ===
In Croatian the euro and cent are called euro and cent (occasionally the word eurocent is used instead of cent to distinguish the euro denomination versus its foreign counterparts).

Plural forms are, like in many Slavic languages, somewhat complex. The general plural form of euro is euri, but the paucal or identically written (but not identically pronounced) genitive plural eura is used with all numbers, thus 27 eura. The numbers ending in 1 (e.g. 21 or 101) take the nominative singular, the exception being numbers ending in 11 (e.g. 11 or 111). The examples are: 21 euro, 101 euro, 11 eura, and 111 eura respectively.

The general plural form of cent is centi and it is used with most numbers. The numbers ending in 1, except for those ending in 11, take the nominative singular cent, while those ending in 2, 3 and 4 except 12, 13 or 14 take the paucal centa. The examples are: 1 cent, 4 centa, 7 centi, 10 centi, 11 centi, 12 centi, 22 centa, 27 centi, 31 cent, 101 cent, 102 centa, 111 centi.

Both euro and cent in Croatian are of masculine gender.

Pronunciation follows the rules of Croatian. Euro is pronounced [ěuro], while cent is pronounced [tsênt].

=== Czech ===
In Czech, the words euro and cent are spelt the same as in English and pronounced per Czech phonology [ˈɛuro], [tsɛnt]. Occasionally the word eurocent is used instead of cent to distinguish the euro denomination versus its foreign counterparts. The spelling differs from the Czech word for Europe (Evropa); however "euro-" has become a standard prefix for all things relating to the EU (Evropská unie).

The Czech declension uses different form of plural for various numerals: for 2, 3 and 4, it is plain nominative eura and centy, while for numbers above 5, genitive (a vestige of partitive) eur and centů is used.

For compound numerals, there are two variants: either genitive plural is used (21 eur, 22 eur) or the form is determined by the unit part of the numeral (21 euro, 22 eura). The partitive genitive is used only when the whole numeral phrase is in nominative or accusative phrases, otherwise the expected case is used: sedm eur (7 euros-genitive), but se sedmi eury (with seven-instrumental euro-instrumental). Moreover, these otherwise common declensions are often ignored and non-declined euro is used for every value (22 euro), even though this form is proscribed.

In Czech euro is of neuter gender and inflected like město, while cent is masculine and inflected like hrad.

=== Danish ===
The word euro is included in the 2002 version of Retskrivningsordbogen, the authoritative source for the Danish language (according to Danish law). Two plurals are given, euro when referring to an amount, and euroer when referring to coins. Both cent and eurocent are mentioned; the plural and singular forms are identical.

Danish words of Greek origin containing the sequence eu are traditionally pronounced with [œʊ̯], e.g. Zeus, terapeut, eutanasi, Europa. However, some words, such as eutanasi, Europa, and euro, are also pronounced with [eʊ̯].

=== Dutch ===
Plural: In Dutch, most abstract units of measurement are not pluralised, including the former Dutch guilder (gulden in Dutch) and Belgian franc (called frank in Dutch), and now the euro. An amount such as €5 is pronounced vijf euro. This coincides with EU legislation stating that euro and cent should be used as both singular and plural. In Dutch, the words are however pluralised as euro's and centen when referring to individual coins.

The euro is divided into 100 cent, as was the guilder. The Belgian franc was divided into 100 centiemen. The word eurocent is sometimes used to distinguish it from the cents of other currencies, such as the dollarcent, but originally mainly to differentiate it from what used to be 0.01 guilder, also called "cent".

Pronunciation: The word euro is /ˈøːroː/ phonemically. This can be pronounced the same phonetically, but commonly also as [ˈʏːroː], [ˈʏːroʊ], and others depending on the dialect and speaker (see Dutch phonology).

Slang terms: In the Netherlands, slang terms that were previously applied to guilder coinage and banknotes are sometimes applied to euro currency. Examples in the Netherlands include stuiver for 5 cents, dubbeltje for 10 cents. However, the word kwartje (quarter), previously used for a guilder coin worth ƒ0.25, did not survive the introduction of the euro, which lacks a coin worth €0.25. Another popular slang term is the plural form euri (/ˈøːri/) (or even the double plural euries (/ˈøːris/)), a deliberate hypercorrect form referring to the plural of Dutch words of Latin or Italian origin.

In Belgium, some Flemings refer to the 1-, 2- and 5-cent coins as koper, which is the Dutch word for copper, the metal these coins are made of (compare nickel). Another nickname is "ros" ("redhead") or "roskes" ("little redheads"), referring to the colour of the coins.

Syntax: In Dutch language print, the euro sign (€) is chiefly placed before the amount, from which it is often separated by a (thin) space. This was also the case with the florin sign (ƒ).

=== English ===
In the English-language version of European Union legislation, the unit euro, without an s, is used for both singular and plural. However, the plural euros is also in everyday use. Many style guides, such as those from the Associated Press and The Economist, specify the plural euros, and major dictionaries describe it as the most common form.

Official practice for English-language EU legislation (not necessarily in national legislation) is to use the words euro and cent as both singular and plural. This practice originally arose out of legislation intended to ensure that the banknotes were uncluttered with a string of plurals. Because the s-less plurals had become "enshrined" in EU legislation, the Commission decided to retain those plurals in English in legislation even while allowing regular plurals in other languages. The Directorate-General for Translation's English Style Guide (a handbook for authors and translators working for the European Commission) previously recommended the use of regular plurals where appropriate, but as of May 2019, states that no s should be used. Prior to 2006, the inter-institutional style guide recommended use of euro and cent without the plural s, and the translation style guide recommended use of invariant plurals (without s) when amending or referring to original legislation but use of regular plurals in documents intended for the general public.

==== In Ireland ====
As the euro was being adopted in Ireland, the Department of Finance decided to use the word euro as both the singular and plural forms of the currency. The national broadcaster, RTÉ, and some other media outlets followed suit. However, euros is also acceptable. The print media frequently uses "euro" for plural amounts, although use of "euros" is also common.

Slang terms: As in the Netherlands, slang terms that were previously applied to punts have been carried over to the euro currency. For example, quid (same in singular and plural), which once referred to an Irish pound (and in the UK still refers to a British pound) is used as a synonym for euro. Also, fiver and tenner, which once referred to five and ten pounds respectively, now refer to five and ten euro – either in the sense of the specific €5 and €10 banknotes, or in the broader sense of an equivalent sum of money.

==== In English-speaking countries outside the EU ====
In the United Kingdom, despite not using the euro as its currency, the terms "euros" and "cents" are more common than the plurals without the "s". The use of "s" for euros and cents is recommended by the Oxford English Dictionary.

The term euro-cent is sometimes used in countries (such as Australia, Canada, and the United States) which also have "cent" as a currency subdivision, to distinguish them from their local coin. This usage, though unofficial, is mirrored on the coins themselves, which have the words EURO and CENT displayed on the common side.

=== Finnish ===
The Finnish pronunciation for "euro" is [ˈeu̯ro]. In Finnish, the form sentti [ˈsentːi] is used for the cent – the letter 'c' is generally not used in Finnish, and nativized Finnish words cannot end in consonant combinations like '-nt', therefore an extra vowel 'i' is added. euro and sentti are declined like many other existing words ending in -o and -i, and sentti displays consonant gradation (genitive euron, sentin). With numerals, the partitive singulars euroa and senttiä are used, e.g., 10 euroa. This is abbreviated 10 €, where the € symbol takes the role of the word euroa (never *€10 or *10€). The colon notation (€:a) must not be used with the partitive of euro when the number is in the nominative. In general, colon notation should be avoided and, for example, one should write euron or euroa instead of €:n or €:a.

Plurals (e.g., kymmenet eurot "tens of euros") exist, but they are not used with singular numbers (e.g., kymmenen euroa "ten euro").

Sentti is problematic in that its primary meaning in colloquial language is "centimeter". Thus, the officially recommended abbreviation of sentti is snt, although Finnish merchants generally use a decimal notation (for example 0,35 €).

Slang terms: In Helsinki slang, a common nickname for euro is ege. In Tampere slang Eero, a common male name, may be used for euro.

=== French ===
In French, the singular is un euro (masculine). The official plural is the same as the regular plural euros. The Académie française, which is regarded as an authority for the French language in France, stated this clearly, following French legislation in this regard.

In France, the word centime is far more common than cent and is recommended by the Académie française. Centime used to be a hundredth of the French franc which is now called centime de franc. The word cent (plural cents, both pronounced [sɛnt] to avoid the confusion with cent (100) pronounced [sɑ̃]) is the official term to be used in the French-language version of community legislation. Before its use in relation to the euro, the word "cent" (pronounced as in English, [sɛnt]) was best known to European Francophones as a hundredth of a dollar (U.S., Canadian, etc.)

French-speaking Belgians use cent more often than centime because centime coins for the Belgian franc (worth, on 1 January 1999 about three U.S. cents) rarely circulated (only a 50 centime coin was still being issued) and because of the influence of Dutch and English, which are more commonly used in Belgium than in France as a result of Belgium's language diversity.

Slang terms: the euro is often referred to as balle, meaning ball or bullet in English. This use of the word balle can be traced back to the 17th century.

=== German ===
Plural: In German, Euro and Cent are used as both singular and plural when following a numeral, as is the case with all units of measurement of masculine (e.g. Meter, Dollar) or neuter gender (e.g. Kilo[gramm], etc.). However, when talking about individual coins, the plurals Euros and Cents are used.

The only other marked case is the genitive singular, which is (des) Euros or, alternatively, des Euro.

Pronunciation: The beginning of the word Euro is pronounced in German with the diphthong [ɔʏ], which sounds similar to /ɔɪ/, the 'oi' in the English word "oil".

The spelling of the word Cent is not well adapted to German spelling conventions because these strive to avoid ambiguous letter-sound correspondences. Initial letter C is often used in loanwords and corresponds to various pronunciations depending on the language of origin (e.g. [s] in Centime, [tʃ] in Cello, [ts] in Celsius and [k] in Café). Most of these words are therefore eventually spelt phonetically (e.g. Kaffee, Tschechien (Czech Republic), Zentimeter).

Latin words beginning with "ce" such as centum (hundred) traditionally represent [ts] in German, and German words derived from these have therefore long been spelt with a Z, which represents [ts] (as in Zentrum (centre), Zentimeter (centimetre), etc.). Equivalently, some German speakers pronounce the beginning of the word "Cent" [ts], but since they are familiar with the English pronunciation of the American unit cent, most people pronounce it [s].

As these are nouns, both Euro and Cent are capitalised in German.

Slang terms: In the year of its introduction, the euro has briefly been called Teuro in Austria and Germany, a play on the word teuer, meaning 'expensive'. This was because the German Mark converted to the Euro at a rate of 1.95583:1, and some grocers and restaurants were accused of taking advantage of the transition by raising their prices—an item that might have cost DM 0.89 (€ 0.46) on the 29th of December 2001, would cost € 0.49 on the following 2nd of January.

In youth and Internet culture the fake plural Euronen is sometimes used; this form's origin is unknown but it bears resemblance to Dublonen (doubloons) and has a retro ring to it. Also, "Öre" is occasionally used, the name of the Swedish currency. Unlike the previous currencies (Mark and Schilling) which had well established nicknames for individual coins and notes, there are few widely used nicknames for Euros, but the two Euro coin is sometimes called Zwickel like the old two Mark piece.

In German Usenet culture, the name Fragezeichen (question mark) was occasionally used in reference to initial problems with display of the euro sign, which was often rendered as a question mark. The term was most often written using the mock currency code FRZ. This technical trouble has diminished and so has the usage of this term.

Abbreviations: EUR. TEUR for thousand Euros and MEUR for a million Euros are often used in financial documents. Numbers are given with a comma as decimal separator.

=== Greek ===
In the Greek language the indeclinable word ευρώ ([evˈro]) is used as the currency's name. It was decided to use omega (ω) rather than omicron (ο) as the last letter of the word, partly because a noun ending with omicron would encourage mutability, and partly to stress the origin of the euro in the Greek word Ευρώπη (Eurōpē, Europe) which is also spelt with omega and it is actually written on the euro notes in Greek as ΕΥΡΩ. Also, the spelling ΕΥΡΟ (resulting in a plural ΕΥΡΑ) on the notes could have confused other Europeans, who might read it as a string of Latin letters: eypo. A plural form evra, as if from a regular declinable neuter noun in -o, is sometimes used in a jocular way.

For the cent, the terms used in Greece are λεπτό, plural λεπτά (leptó, plural leptá), a name used for small denominations of various ancient and modern Greek currencies, including the drachma (which the euro replaced). The word means 'minute' (literally "thin"), the same as the unit of measurement of time or of angle. The term ευρωλεπτό, plural ευρωλεπτά (evroleptó, plural evroleptá) is sometimes used when a speaker wants to be completely specific that they are referring to money and not time.

Some colloquial names for currency are also in use for the euro, carried over from the drachma. One and two euro coins are respectively called φράγκο (frango) and δίφραγκο (difrango) from the French franc. A 5 euro banknote is also colloquially called τάληρο (taliro) from the Germanic root thaler via the Italian talero. A 10 euro banknote is called δεκάρικο (dekariko), a 20 euro banknote is called εικοσάρικο (eikosariko) or εικοσάρι (eikosari), and a 50 euro banknote is called πενηντάρικο (penintariko), derivatives of the words for ten, twenty and fifty.

10 lepta of a drachma were called δεκάρα (dekara), but since lepta of the drachma were out of circulation long before the euro, this word is now considered too old-fashioned and only used in old expressions and thus it is not used for the 10 eurocent coin. Nevertheless, all Greeks understand the word to stand for 10 cents of any currency and thus use it for non-euro currencies like the dime of the US dollar. The same is true for the 5-cent coin which is not called πεντάρα (pentara) like its drachma equivalent. These words come from the words for five and ten respectively.

In Cyprus, however, the cent is officially called σεντ (sent) both in singular and plural. This is the name formerly used for 1/100 of the Cypriot pound chosen for its neutrality to both official languages of the Republic (Greek and Turkish).

=== Hungarian ===
In Hungarian the currency is named euró ([ˈɛuroː]) and cent ([ˈt͡sɛnt]) without plural forms (as in Hungarian no plural is used after numerals), the former written with an accented ó, as decided by the Research Institute for Linguistics of the Hungarian Academy of Sciences. The spelling is also in accordance with the word Európa ("Europe") in Hungarian.

Hungarian language does not use plural after numerals, as numerals already express plural; however, both euró and cent can take suffixes regarding to grammatical cases, just as:

- Accusative case: eurót
- Dative case: eurónak
- Instrumental case: euróval ("with euro")
- Causative case: euróért ("for euro")
- etc.

On introduction of the euro, Hungary—along with Lithuania, Latvia, and Slovenia—struggled for the euro to be written in its official documents according to its own usage and spelling, in contrast with Community law, which provides for a single name throughout the Union (in the nominative singular and taking account of different alphabets).

The Treaty of Lisbon, signed in 2009, contains the following declaration from Hungary, Latvia and Malta:

58. Declaration by the Republic of Latvia, the Republic of Hungary and the Republic of Malta on the spelling of the name of the single currency in the Treaties
Without prejudice to the unified spelling of the name of the single currency of the European Union referred to in the Treaties as displayed on the banknotes and on the coins, Latvia, Hungary and Malta declare that the spelling of the name of the single currency, including its derivatives as applied throughout the Latvian, Hungarian and Maltese text of the Treaties, has no effect on the existing rules of the Latvian, Hungarian or Maltese languages.

=== Irish ===
In Irish, the words euro and cent are used without change in spelling or pronunciation, and immune to the regular rules of Irish mutation after numbers; as such, they are ungendered, and the plural euronna is thus rarely encountered. The word ceint [ˈkʲɛnʲtʲ] (plural ceinteanna [ˈkʲɛnʲtʲən̪ˠə]) has been in the lexicon since at least 1959 and is attested in printed literature, but is very rarely encountered.

Linguist Michael Everson in a 2001 paper proposed a new masculine noun eoró [ˈɔɾˠoː] (plural eorónna [ˈɔɾˠoːn̪ˠə]), or alternatively eora (plural eoraí), derived from Eoraip ('Europe'), as being a more grammatically acceptable Irish term. However, it was not widely adopted and is not in common use.

Irish also practices lenition after the numerals 2–6 (5 cheint) and eclipsis after numerals 7–10 (9 gceint, 8 n-eoró). However, as ceint is irregularly pronounced (no other Irish word has a soft c), lenition and eclipsis are usually not applied.

=== Italian ===
In Italian the word euro is used, as both singular and plural. Its standard pronunciation is [ˈɛuro], although in several northern accents it is pronounced as [ˈeuro] instead. The plural form euri is uncommon, but not considered incorrect.

The issue of whether the correct plural form would be euri or euro remained open for a long time, predating the actual introduction of the currency. The Accademia della Crusca assigned to Severina Parodi, lexicographer, and to Luca Serianni, language historian, the task to give a response. They deliberated in favour of euri in 1999 with the motivation that "euro is a masculine noun". But the issue was then re-examined many times. Finally, in 2001 the consensus of the Accademia coalesced in favour of invariability. The rationale was based on the fact that abbreviated words originating from a longer word (for example auto from automobile (car) or moto from motocicletta (motorbike)) do not have a plural form, as well as the fact that the word euro is considered an abbreviation of the word Eurovaluta (European currency). In 2002 an amendment to the financial act was proposed to adopt euri as the plural form for public official deeds, but was quickly rejected by the Parliament.

The word cent (pronounced [tʃɛnt]) is in practical use always replaced by the word centesimo ([tʃenˈteːzimo]), which simply means "hundredth" (also see centime in French); its plural form is centesimi. Cent only appears on documents such as electricity and telephone bills; it is perceived by native speakers as an abbreviation of "centesimo" (and in fact often followed by a period) rather than as an autonomous proper name. It should also be added that the word "cent", or "centesimo", is often omitted altogether in current usage, when it follows an amount expressed in higher values: a sum of € 1,50 is commonly referred to as "one euro fifty" ("un euro e cinquanta"), with no reference to the cent partition.

=== Latvian ===
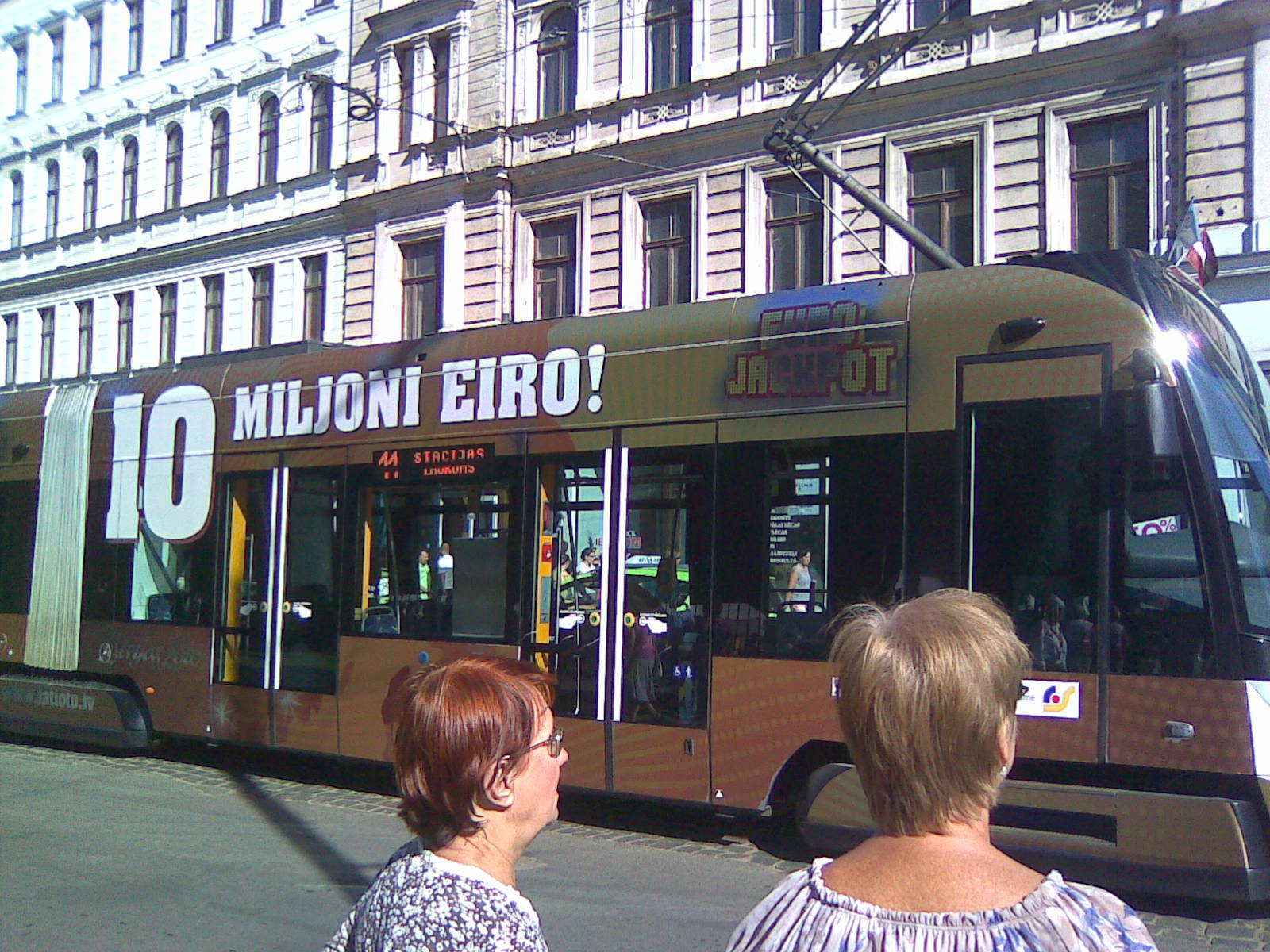
Advertising on a tram using the word 'eiro' for the euro

In Latvian the commonly used term is eiro (which somewhat resembles the West European euro, but has also taken its sound from Eiropa, the Latvian word for Europe).

In 2004 it was proposed by Terminology Commission of the Latvian Academy of Sciences that standardized usage should be eira as eiro is undeclinable in Latvian. The commission argued that a potentially frequently used term needs to fit especially well in the structure of Latvian grammar. They suggested that eiro is especially inconvenient to use in dative and locative, which would necessitate addition of valūta ("currency") for clarification.

However, this decision resulted in public outcry, which resulted in the commission amending its original ruling to state that usage of euro is inappropriate for Latvian, and that eiro is acceptable as a parallel form, but its use should be limited and it should be dropped over time. The reasoning was explained, that while they still insist on the use of eira, they acknowledge that half of the users of the language are not content with such a form. They explained that the use of euro (and cent without nominative ending) is ill-suited to the language because an eu diphthong does not exist in Latvian, and orthographic rules discourage spellings that do not reflect pronunciation.

=== Lithuanian ===
In Lithuanian the euro and cent are called euras ([ˈɛʊrɐs]) and centas ([ˈtsʲɛntɐs]) (in common language sometimes euro centas, to distinguish from the cents of the former Lithuanian currency, litas), while plural forms are eurai and centai (eurocentai). The Lithuanian language routinely adapts foreign words by re-spelling them according to Lithuanian phonetic rules and adding standardised endings, resulting in words like kompiuteris.

=== Maltese ===
In Maltese, the spelling is ewro, as announced in December 2005. The currency name ewro is spelt with w (not with a u) as derived from the Maltese word Ewropa (Europe), also written with w. Furthermore, the vowels e and u are not written next to each other in Maltese, except when they are pronounced as two syllables, which is not the case here. The plural of the word remains unchanged, as the singular. The cent is known as ċenteżmu, plural ċenteżmi, both abbreviated to ċ.

In Maltese, ewro is written with a small letter e and is masculine singular – as in "L-ewro huwa..." (The euro is...) and "Il-munita tal-ewro hija" (The euro coin is...).

=== Polish ===
In Polish, euro is both singular and plural, and pronounced [ˈɛwrɔ]. This noun belongs to a small group of nouns of foreign origin in Polish that, as an exception, remain non-declinable in any of the seven cases (other examples being zoo, Waterloo and few others). It is however likely for the word euro to follow the pattern of other foreign words like kino, studio and radio and eventually become fully declinable in a similar manner as a result of a full linguistic absorption of the word into Polish. Cent is declinable, being eurocent or simply cent ([ɛurotsɛnt]) in singular nominative and eurocenty or centy ([ɛuroˈtsɛntɨ]) in plural nominative or eurocentów or centów ([ɛuroˈtsɛntuf]) in plural genitive.

=== Portuguese ===
In Portuguese, euro has a Portuguese word-ending and thus is used in the singular, with euros the plural form. Cent, which does not conform to Portuguese word-forming rules, is commonly converted to cêntimo (singular) and cêntimos (plural).

The term cêntimo might have been adopted to distinguish it from the fractional value of the Portuguese escudo, which was called centavo.

Pronunciation of euro in Portuguese is still not standardized: either [ˈewɾɔ] or [ˈewɾu]. The latter has the regular final unstressed -o pronunciation, as [u], and is more widespread in the north of the country, while the former is more common in the south. Euro, cêntimo and centavo are masculine nouns in Portuguese, and as such, "the cents" are translated as os cêntimos and "those euros" as aqueles euros.

In Brazil the pronunciation is [ˈewɾu] (generally [ˈeu̯ɾu] in Rio de Janeiro and further north, as in Portugal, and [ˈeʊ̯ɾʊ] in São Paulo and further south and west as well as the places where southern Brazilians settled) and fractional values are called centavos de euro (cents of euro) to differentiate them from Brazilian real "centavos".

Units up to 1000 are colloquially designated as paus: 50 euros is designated as 50 paus. This name carried over from the escudo.

=== Romanian ===
In Romanian the euro and cent are called euro and cent [t͡ʃent] (plural cenți [t͡ʃent͡sʲ]). The official plural of euro is also euro, and this official form was readily adopted by speakers. The "eu" construct is not a diphthong, thus the pronunciation is [ˈe.uro].

When speaking in a familiar–vernacular setting, some speakers would make the informal plural "euroi", which is unofficial and more colloquial.

=== Slovak ===
In Slovak the euro and cent are called euro and cent, the plural forms for amounts between 2 and 4 are 2 eurá/centy, and the plural forms for larger amounts are 5 eur/centov. Euro is spelt with a u because it is derived from the word Európa (Europe). The c in cent represents /ts/.

Slang terms: common nicknames for euro in Slovak includes: euráče, evri, juráše, éčka (literally "e"-s or "letters ‘e’"). Cents are sometimes jokingly called šestáky (as a common term for coins with small value); meďáky or medenáky (literally "coppers" or "the copper ones") or haliere which is a reference to the small coins of the original Slovak currency.

=== Slovene ===
In Slovene the euro and cent are called evro and cent ([ˈeːwrɔ], [tsɛnt]), the dual form is 2 evra/centa ([ˈeːwra], [ˈtseːnta] or [ˈtsɛːn-]) and the plural forms are 3/4 evri/centi ([ˈeːwri], [ˈtseːnti] or [ˈtsɛːn-]), 5+ evrov/centov ([ˈeːwrɔw], [ˈtseːntɔw] or [ˈtsɛːn-]), the same declension case being used for all higher numerals up to 100, then beginning again (101 evro/cent, 102 evra/centa, 103 evri/centi, 104 evri/centi, 105 evrov/centov etc.). Evro is spelt with v according to standard Slovene orthography, and matches the word Evropa (Europe).

In laws and regulations, though, the word ‘evro’ is replaced with the word ‘euro’ in all grammatical cases in accordance with an agreement between Slovenia and the European Union. In normative Slovene language usage ‘evro’ spelling should only be used, except as noted.

=== Spanish ===
In the Spanish language, the official plural is the same as its regular plural euros. For the cent, the word céntimo (plural céntimos) can be used. The fraction of the peseta was also called céntimo, but no céntimo coins had been issued since 1980, and had since been demonetised. The word "euro" is pronounced [ˈewɾo] in Spanish, and "céntimo" [ˈθentimo] in Spain or [ˈsentimo] in Latin America.

Slang terms: the euro is often referred to as pavo, meaning turkey in English (the usual translation for buck in dubbed films).

=== Swedish ===
In Swedish writing, euro is spelt euro (and cent is spelt cent) both in singular and plural, or written EUR, or €. The € sign is common in Finland but rare in Sweden. The currency "the euro" is spelt euron following Swedish grammar rules. There are many Swedish laws mentioning amounts in euro, because of EU directives, using euro for the amounts and expression like "belopp i euro" (amount in euro), not the € sign.

In Sweden, the accepted pronunciations are [ˈɛ̌v(ː)rʊ] (more common and similar to how eu is pronounced in modern Swedish in neuro-) or [ˈɛ̌ɵrʊ] (similar to how eu is pronounced in modern Swedish in Europa). However, many Swedes choose to pronounce it in a more English way [ˈjǔːrʊ] (no s in plural). This pronunciation is rejected by official authorities, such as the Swedish Language Council, and not used in television news. In Sweden there are no widespread slang terms since the euro is a foreign currency.

In Finland, the euro is the official currency, and Swedish is an official language alongside Finnish. The same spelling as in Sweden is used (officially Swedish in Finland is spelt as in Sweden). The pronunciation, however, is [ˈeuro], which has some similarities to Finnish pronunciation. The abbreviation is like 3,14 €, same as for Finnish. Among Swedish-speaking as well as Finnish-speaking people in Helsinki, a common slang term is "ege".

== Other languages ==
=== Albanian ===
In Albanian, the euro is referred to as "euro". This is the same for Albanian in Kosovo, North Macedonia and rest of the Balkans. Some Kosovo Albanian speakers however, pronounce euro like Germans; 'oiro'/'oi', due to heavily migration. It is derived from the Albanian word for Europe, "Europa", "Europë" and also "Evropa"/"Evropë". All variants are official in Albanian, however Albania uses Euro, Europa or Europe whilst other Albanian dialects such as in Kosovo, North Macedonia, Montenegro and Serbia often use Evrope or Evropa. However the currency euro is not ever pronounced as evro like their Slavic neighbours.

Note: depending on dialect, location, diaspora and ethnicity some Albanians vary their pronunciations based on standard Albanian, Italian, Greek, German or Slavic (such as those in North Macedonia or Serbia).

=== Arabic ===
In Arabic, the euro is usually referred to as يورو [ˈjuːro, ˈjuːru], which is an adaptation of the English pronunciation of the currency's name. Another naming is اورو [ˈʔoːro], which is an approximation of the French pronunciation [ø.ʁo]. In most cases this term is used both for the singular and the plural form, although the plurals يوروات /juːroˈwaːt/ and يوروهات /juːroˈhaːt/ are sometimes encountered. The name for Europe in Arabic is أوروبا /ʔo(ː)ˈrobba, -ˈroppa/. Because loanwords are not of Arabic origin, they are pronounced in accordance with the spoken varieties of Arabic phonology. For example, أوروبا is pronounced [ʔoˈɾobbɑ, -ˈɾoppɑ] by Egyptian Arabic speakers, while [ʔoːˈrobba, -ˈroppa] by Levantine Arabic speakers.

Attempts to artificially arabize the pronunciation according to the standardized Arabic phonology would be more conforming to Arabic transliterations such as Yūrū / ʾŪrū, ʾŪrubbā which would be theoretically pronounced /ˈjuːruː, ˈʔuːruː, ʔuːˈrubbaː/ for يورو, اورو, أوروبا, respectively. See also Arabic diglossia to understand why the pronunciation differs from region to region.

=== Armenian ===
The Armenian word for euro is Եվրո, pronounced [jɛvˈɹɔ] in exactly the same way as the Greek, with an added initial y sound. It is derived from the Armenian word for Europe, Եվրոպա, which is pronounced [jɛvɹɔˈpa], as stress in Armenian usually falls on the final syllable. Cent in Armenian is pronounced [ˈt͡sʰɛnt] (ցենտ).

The plural of euro, in accordance with the formation of plurals in Armenian, is Եվրոներ [ɛvɹɔˈnɛɹ]. The plural of cent, however, is ցենտի, pronounced [t͡sʰɛnˈti].

=== Asturian ===
In Asturian, there has been a controversy about the spelling of the word. The official academic dictionary uses the spelling euru, respecting the Asturian tendency to write nouns with a final -u. However, considering that the international use is euro and that there is a tendency in Asturian to write some short forms with a final -o (like euro from Europa), other linguists, like Ramón d'Andrés, defend the spelling euro.

=== Azerbaijani ===
The Azerbaijani name for Europe is Avropa, similar to that of its sister language, Turkish, and the Azerbaijani word for euro, derived from that for Europe, is avro, identical to Turkish.

=== Catalan ===
In Catalan the official plural is the same as its regular plural euros. The standard pronunciation of "euro" is [ˈɛwɾu].

For the cent, the word cèntim (pronounced [ˈsɛntim], plural cèntims) is used, since historically this term has been used as the hundredth part of a currency unit. The fraction of the peseta was also called cèntim, but it was withdrawn from circulation decades ago.

=== Chinese ===
In Chinese, the euro is known as 欧元 (simplified), 歐元 (traditional), ōuyuán (pinyin), which comes from the Chinese word for Europe, 欧洲 (Ōuzhōu), and the unit word 元 (yuán), which literally translates to a "round coin" within the context of currency. This follows the same pattern as the word for the United States dollar, which is 美元 (měiyuán). For cent, the word 欧分 (ōufēn), is used, where the character 分 (fēn) translates as cent for any currency, similar to how 美分 means United States cent.

However, in Hong Kong it is often referred to as 歐羅 (Jyutping: au¹lo⁴). The Hong Kong Monetary Authority notes that 元 is only used if the currency in question ends with "dollar" in English (for example, United States dollar and Canadian dollar). Homophonic translation is used if the unit is not "dollar", with such cases including the euro, pound sterling and Swiss franc.

Plurals do not exist in Chinese, so the same character is used for both singular and plural forms. As the character 元 in 欧元 is a counter word in Chinese, there is no need to put a measure word in front. For example: 五十欧元 (financial Chinese: 伍拾欧元) wǔshí ōuyuán for fifty euro.

=== Cornish ===
In the Cornish language, euro is written ewro (like Ewrop 'Europe'), a masculine noun with its plural ewros. For cent, cent is used, a masculine noun with the plural centys.

=== Esperanto ===
In Esperanto, the currency is called "eŭro", similar to the Esperanto word for the continent "Eŭropo." The o ending in euro conveniently accords with the standard -o noun ending in Esperanto, but rather than sound out e and u separately, Esperanto speakers use the diphthong eŭ, which matches its etymology. Plurals are formed in accordance with Esperanto rules, eŭroj and cendoj. The words are also declined as any Esperanto noun (eŭro/eŭroj in the nominative, eŭron/eŭrojn in the accusative). Since the inventor of the name "euro" Germain Pirlot is an Esperantist it is often assumed that he intentionally chose a word that fits well into the Esperanto grammar.

A cent is cendo, as is commonly used for subunits of all centimalized currency (cents, centimes, etc.). The alternatives are centimo from the French centime or a more technical centono, literally, "one-hundredth part". (Esperanto speakers are unlikely to call a cent cento, since cento means a group of 100, rather than a hundredth.)

=== Faroese ===
In Faroese the euro is called evra, a feminine noun derived from the Faroese name of Europe, Evropa; this makes Faroese (with Icelandic) one of only two European languages in which the word for the euro is feminine. The plural is formed regularly: evrur. The cents are often called sent which is a neuter word and has the same form in the nominative plural.

=== Friulian ===
In Friulian, the euro is called euro and the plural form is euros. E.g. un euro (one euro), doi euros (two euros), trê euros (three euros). Cent is centesim and the plural form is centesims.

=== Georgian ===
In Georgian, the euro is called ევრო (evro, pronounced [ˈevɾo]), derived from the Georgian word for Europe, ევროპა [ˈevɾopʼa]. Unlike in Greek and Armenian, the stress of the word evro falls on the first syllable, as is usual in Georgian. Cent is ცენტი [ˈtsʰentʼi], as nativized Georgian nouns cannot end in a consonant, so a nominative ending 'i' is added. The respective plurals of euro and cent are ევროები [ˈevɾoebi] and ცენტები [ˈtsʰentʼebi].

=== Hebrew ===
When euro coins and banknotes were introduced, the question of the spelling and pronunciation of the currency's name in Hebrew arose. The official name of the currency established by the Academy of the Hebrew Language and the Bank of Israel is אֵירוֹ [ˈeʁo], derived from אֵירוֹפָּה [eˈʁopa] (Europe).

An unofficial spelling and pronunciation יוּרוֹ [ˈjuʁo], derived from the English pronunciation of the currency's name, is also used.

Although in Hebrew currency names are usually declined for singular and plural, both forms of the Euro name are used for the singular and plural alike.

=== Hindi ===
In Hindi, the euro is spelt यूरो (yūro), while cent is written as सेंट (seṇṭ). Neither word is pluralised. Europe is known as यूरोप (Yūrop) in Hindi.

=== Icelandic ===
In Icelandic the euro is called evra, a feminine noun derived from the Icelandic name of Europe, Evrópa; this makes Icelandic (with Faroese) one of only two European languages in which the word for the euro is feminine. The plural is formed regularly: evrur. The cents are often called sent which is a neuter word and has the same form in the nominative plural. However, a more common usage is to write, say, 20 cents as 0,20 evrur.

=== Ido ===
In Ido, there is a rule that "every word pertaining to a national or local custom will get imported to the language without change or adaption, both the singular and the plural forms alike" (known as vorti stranjera – foreign words). This gets especially applied to "currencies, weights and measurements that don't belong to the metric system" (according to KGD, Kompleta Gramatiko Detaloza – Ido's grammar book). Thus the best word for "euro" would be just euro, like dollar and pound, with the plural probably kept the same: euro, since most languages do that. In common speech, though, many Idists commonly refer to the currency as euro and euri as if it got fully adopted to the language because of the common use of the currency.

Similarly, "cent" is cent, with the plural imported from its source, English: cents.

For both words, there are two other possibilities for pluralization. The native plural -i could be added to the vorto stranjera with the dash to mark that it is a foreign word: cent-i and euro-i, or to add the plural definite article le: le cent and le euro, though that generally means "the cents" and "the euros".

=== Interslavic ===
In Interslavic, the diphthongs /au/ and /eu/ are generally written as av and ev, which is common in Slovene, Sorbian and (usually) the Slavic languages that use Cyrillic. Thus, the Interslavic word for "euro" is evro, which is an indeclinable neuter noun. It can be pronounced either [ˈɛvrɔ] or [ˈɛwrɔ].

The word for "cent" is cent (pronounced [t͡sɛnt]), which is declined like an inanimate masculine noun: gen.sg. centa, nom.pl. centy, gen.pl. centov, etc.

=== Japanese ===
In Japanese the euro is called "yūro" (ユーロ) based on the English pronunciation, using the katakana syllabary employed for foreign words. However, the word for Europe in Japanese is "yōroppa" (ヨーロッパ), probably borrowed from the Portuguese Europa ([ˈew.ɾɔpɐ]) or from the Dutch Europa ([øːˈroːpaː], not English. The cent uses the same word employed for all currencies using cents. This is rendered "sento" (or セント in the katakana script) and it is also based on the English pronunciation. In Japanese, like other East Asian languages, no plurals are used for units so both "yūro" and "sento" are used as the singular and plural.

=== Korean ===
In Korean of South Korea, the Euro is called "yuro" (유로) and Cent is called "senteu" (센트). The word for Europe in Korean is "Yureop" (유럽). They are all based on the English pronunciation.

=== Latin ===
Living Latin enthusiasts use euro, -onis (pl. eurones); sometimes also euronummus, -i (pl. euronummi), eurum, -i (pl. eura) or even euronus, -i (pl. euroni)., as well as declining euro in the fourth declension as if it was a Greek name like echo.

=== Leonese ===
In Leonese, a language spoken in the Spanish provinces of León and Zamora, the word for "euro" is "euru", the plural being "euros".

=== Luxembourgish ===
In Luxembourgish the Euro is officially called Euro (pronounced [ˈoɪ̯ʀoː]), both in singular and plural forms, although the correct plural according to linguistic rules would normally be Euroën (pronounced [ˈoɪ̯ʀoːən]).

The Cent is called Cent (pronounced [tsænt]), plural Cents. In popular parlance the term Zantimm (pronounced [ˈtsɑ̃ːtim]) is also used, a word derived from the French Centime.

=== Manx ===
The Manx word for "euro" is either oarey (plural: oaraghyn), based on Yn Oarpey ("Europe"), or euro, from English. Cent is either kent (plural: kentyn) or sent.

=== Mirandese ===
Mirandese (a regional language spoken in the northeastern Portuguese region of Miranda do Douro) uses the prefix ou already present in words like European (Ouropeu). The singular form is ouro (/ˈow.ɾu/) and the plural form is ouros (/ˈow.ɾuʃ/). Ouro is also the Mirandese word for 'gold', as in Portuguese.

=== Norwegian ===
In Norwegian there could be a problem concerning the spelling, since euro is masculine and would normally take a plural -er ending in Bokmål and -ar in Nynorsk. But since words for foreign currencies (like dollar and yen) normally do not have the endings -er or -ar in Norwegian the Norwegian Language Council reached a decision in 1996 that the proper declension of the word euro should be

in Bokmål:

en euro – euroen – euro – euroene

in Nynorsk:

ein euro – euroen – euro – euroane

The declensions are respectively: The two first in Singular, and the two last in Plural, while the first of each category are indefinite, the last of each category are definite nouns. The word cent is an old loan word in Norwegian – and it is declined the same way:

in Bokmål:

en cent – centen – cent – centene

in Nynorsk:

ein cent – centen – cent – centane

The pronunciation of the two words in Norwegian are [ˈæ̌ʉɾu] and [ˈsɛnt].

=== Romansh ===
In Romansh, the words are euro and cent; these are regular masculine nouns forming their plurals with -s, as euros and cents, respectively.

=== Russian ===
Russia currently borders four eurozone members: Finland, Estonia, Latvia and Lithuania. They supply much of the euro inflow in Russia in trade exchange and tourism. In Russian, just like in Bulgarian, euro is spelt евро ("jevro", pronounced [ˈjevrə]) both in the singular and the plural, while cent is цент [t͡sɛnt] (sg.) and центы [ˈt͡sɛntɨ] (pl.), though there are many colloquial semi-ironic forms such as евры 'jevry' or еврики 'jevriki' (there's no plural form for euro in Russian), копейки for cents and others. Just as in Italian, although евро could have been declined as a regular neuter noun, it was made indeclinable like many neutral loanwords ending in a vowel: бюро [bʲʊˈro] bureau, office, writing-desk, пальто [pɐlʲˈto] overcoat, бордо [bɐrˈdo] Bordeaux wine, claret etc.; the same form is used in the singular and the plural. Cents are sometimes transliterated as цент 'tsent' – singular, центы 'tsenty' – plural. Numerative form is цент for 1 cent (as well as amounts that end in 1 except for the ones ending in 11 – e.g. 51 цент but 11 центов), центa, the genitive singular, for 2 to 4 cents (as well as any other amounts ending in 2, 3 or 4, except for the ones ending in 12, 13, 14 – e.g. 54 центa but 12 центoв) and центoв, genitive plural, for the rest – 88 центoв. Sometimes eвроцент (also romanized as 'jevrocent' or 'evrotsent') is used to distinguish euro-cents from the American cents. (If евро had been treated as a regular neuter noun instead of being indeclinable, it would have the forms *евра (regular plural or genitive singular) and *евр (genitive plural), but this treatment would have been unusual for a loanword.)

=== Scottish Gaelic ===
Due to the lack of a governing body, there is no consistent usage regarding the terms for euro and cent in Scottish Gaelic. The various approaches include:

- use of English spellings (including the English plural form and pronunciation), treating the nouns as indeclinable: an euro (genitive an euro; plural na euro(s)), an cent (genitive an cent, plural na cent(s))
- use of English spellings and pronunciation for euro but with Gaelic case marking (both masculine and feminine as the gender of the word has not been determined to date)
  - as a masculine noun: an t-euro (genitive an euro, plural na h-euro(s))
  - as a feminine noun: an euro (genitive na h-euro, plural na h-euro(s))
- fully gaelicized forms (based on the Gaelic word Eòrpa "Europe") such as: an t-eòra (genitive an eòra, plural na h-eòrathan), an seant (genitive an t-seant, plural na seantaichean)

=== Serbian ===
In Serbian the euro and cent are called evro (Cyrillic: евро) [ěʋro] and cent (Cyrillic: цент) [tsênt]. Evro is spelt with a v because it is derived from the name Европа/Evropa (Europe).

Both evro and cent are masculine nouns. They are inflected according to regular rules of the language:

- When not accompanied by a number, plural quantities are in whatever grammatical case is appropriate to the context: the nominative plurals are evri (Cyrillic: еври) and centi (Cyrillic: центи).
- When accompanied by a number ending with the digit 1 (except the combination 11) the singular form is used: 21 evro (Cyrillic: 21 евро), 101 cent (Cyrillic: 101 цент).
- When accompanied by a "small number", i.e. one ending with the digit 2, 3 or 4 (except the combinations 12, 13, 14), the paucal form is used: 22 evra (Cyrillic: 22 евра), 102 centa (Cyrillic: 102 цента).
- When accompanied by a "large number", i.e. one ending with a digit outside the 1–4 range (or one ending with any of the combination 11, 12, 13, 14) the genitive plural is used: 111 evra (Cyrillic: 111 евра), 25 centi (Cyrillic: 25 центи) or rarely 25 centa (Cyrillic: 25 цента).

The genitive plural centi is produced in an old-fashioned way that is today mostly reserved for measurement units. The alternative centa follows the vastly more common pattern of other masculine nouns but is very rarely heard in practice.

=== Turkish ===
Turkey and Northern Cyprus continue to use the Turkish lira as their official currency, but the euro is popularly used, particularly by individuals wanting to convert their savings into a more stable currency or by dual citizens. Euro has been pronounced by a majority similar to the English fashion (phonetically transcribed in Turkish as yuro) since its inception, although it has been reported in 2004 that pronunciations based on French (phonetically transcribed in Turkish as öro) and to a lesser degree German (phonetically transcribed in Turkish as oyro) were also used by a minority.

In response to criticism of the widespread English pronunciation of euro, the Turkish Language Association officially introduced avro into Turkish ("av" being the first syllable of the Turkish word for Europe, Avrupa) in 1998. A concerted campaign by the Turkish Language Association has begun to blossom in recent years, with most sections of the Turkish media now using the new word. It has yet to enter widespread colloquial use, however. It has been reported in 2004 that the Central Bank of the Republic of Turkey prefers the usage of euro over avro.

=== Ukrainian ===
The euro is becoming relatively widespread in Ukraine although the country did not border the eurozone until 1 January 2009. In standard literary Ukrainian the name is євро (pronounced [ˈjɛu̯ro]). The same form is used in singular and plural cases. Cents are translated as цент [tsɛnt] in the singular and центи [ˈtsɛntɪ] in the plural. In the Ukrainian language there is some variation in cases. Numerative form is цент for 1 cent (as well as amounts that end in 1 except for the ones ending in 11 – e.g. 51 цент but 11 центів), центи for 2 to 4 cents (as well as any other amounts ending in 2, 3 or 4, except for the ones ending in 12, 13, 14 – e.g. 54 центи but 12 центів) and центів for the rest – 88 центів. Sometimes євроцент [ˌjɛu̯roˈtsɛnt] is used to distinguish eurocents from American cents.

=== Welsh ===
In the Welsh language, the terms for "euro" and "cent" are ewro [ˈɛurɔ] (plural: ewros [ˈɛurɔs, ˈɛurɔz]) and sent [sɛnt] (plural: sentiau [ˈsɛntjaɨ, ˈsɛntjai]) respectively. Grammatical points to note about their usage include the fact that in Welsh, numerals are followed by singular nouns, for example, pum ewro "five euros", deg sent "ten cents", and that ewro is a masculine noun whereas sent is feminine, thus affecting the form of the numeral that precedes them, for example, tri ewro "three euros" but tair sent "three cents".

Informally, the more Anglicised pronunciation [ˈɪurɔ] may be used, written either with the standard spelling or as iwro or English euro. The word euro [ˈɛɨrɔ, ˈɛirɔ], however, is a separate word in Welsh meaning "to gild" (from aur "gold"). It should also be noted that the Welsh abbreviation c stands for ceiniog "penny, pence".
