= Florin (disambiguation) =

The florin was the former currency of the Republic of Florence that was used from 1252 to 1533.

Florin may also refer to:

== Modern currencies ==
- Aruban florin, the currency of Aruba
- Hungarian forint, the official currency of Hungary
- The currency sign "ƒ", called the florin sign

== Obsolete currencies ==
- Austro-Hungarian florin, used from 1754 to 1892
- Dutch guilder, used in the Netherlands from 1680 to 2002
- East African florin, used in British East Africa from 1920 to 1921
- Lombardy-Venetia florin, used in the pre-unification Italian state of Lombardy-Veneto 1862-1866
- South German gulden, used from 1754 to 1873
- United States of Belgium florin, 1790, colloquially referred to as the "Silver Lion"
- The Netherlands Antillean guilder (abbreviated ANG) is also known as a "florin", and abbreviated NAFl, used from 1940 to 2025

== Obsolete denominations ==
- Florin (Aragonese coin), minted in the 14th century
- Florin (Australian coin), used from 1910 to 1966
- Florin (English coin), a rare old gold coin valued at six shillings, used only in 1344
- Florin (Irish coin), a two-shilling coin produced from 1928 to 1968
- Florin (Italian coin), the fiorino d'oro minted in Florence in 1252, from which the name "florin" derives; the first gold coin minted in significant quantities in Western Europe since the 7th century
- Florin (New Zealand coin), minted from 1933 to 1965
- Florin (British coin), British coin produced from 1849 to 1970 with its denomination inscribed variously one florin, two shillings, or with both denominations

== Places ==
- Florin, California, in Sacramento County
- Florin, Pennsylvania, in Lancaster County

== People ==
- See Florin (name)

== Fictional currency and places ==
- A currency unit in the computer games Medieval: Total War and Medieval II: Total War, set in medieval Europe.
- One of the two main countries in William Goldman's The Princess Bride (the other is Guilder)
- The type of currency used in the video games Assassin's Creed II and Assassin's Creed Brotherhood, set in late 15th century Italy.
- The currency used in the Stardust (2007 film).
- The currency of the Republic of Cinnabar, the major political entity in David Drake's RCN Series.
