= Fiorini (disambiguation) =

Fiorini may refer to:

== Places ==
- Fiorini, village in Croatia

== Surname ==
- Brayden Fiorini (born 1997), Australian rules footballer
- Chiara Fiorini (born 1956), Swiss painter and object artist
- Elisabetta Fiorini Mazzanti (1799–1879), Italian botanist
- Ettore Fiorini (1933–2023), Italian experimental particle physicist
- Frank Fiorini (1924-1993), one of the five Watergate burglars during the presidency of Richard Nixon
- Giovanni Andrea Fiorini (1716-1778), Italian classical composer, maestro di cappella and organist
- Giovanni Battista Fiorini, Italian painter of the late Renaissance period
- Giuseppe Fiorini (1861–1934), Italian luthier and violin maker
- Guido Fiorini (1897–1966), Italian engineer, architect and art director
- Gustavo Fiorini (1919-?), Italian professional football player
- Ippolito Fiorini (c. 1549–1621), Italian composer and lutenist, and the maestro di capella at the court of Alfonso II d'Este
- Lando Fiorini (1938–2017), Italian actor and singer
- Matteo Fiorini (born 1978), Sammarinese politician, Captain Regent from October 2011 to April 2012
- Olga Fiorini (1927–2022), Italian businesswoman and educator
- Pietro Fiorini (1539- 1629), Italian architect
- Raffaele Fiorini (1828–1898), Italian violin maker
- Silvia Fiorini (born 1969), Italian football midfielder
- Sofia Fiorini (born 2004), Italian race walker

== See also ==
- Fiorina (disambiguation)
- Fiorino (disambiguation)
