= Orthographic transcription =

Transcription method using standard spelling

Orthographic transcription is a transcription method that employs the standard spelling system of the target language.

Examples of orthographic transcription are "Pushkin" and "Pouchkine", respectively the English and French orthographic transcriptions of the surname "Пу́шкин" in the name Алекса́ндр Пу́шкин (Alexander Pushkin). Thus, each target language (English and French) transcribes the surname according to its own orthography.

Contrast with phonetic transcription, phonemic orthography, transliteration, and translation.

== Distinction from transliteration ==
Transcription as a mapping from sound to script must be distinguished from transliteration, which creates a mapping from one script to another that is designed to match the original script as directly as possible. Standard transcription schemes for linguistic purposes include the International Phonetic Alphabet (IPA), and its ASCII equivalent, SAMPA. Transcription is often confused with transliteration, perhaps due to a common journalistic practice of mixing elements of both in rendering foreign names. The resulting practical transcription is a hybrid that is called both "transcription" and "transliteration" by the general public.

While transliteration only occurs when different scripts are concerned, transcription may very well be used for different languages using the same script. For example, the name of Bulgarian city Търговище is rendered as Тырговиште in Russian, because the letters ъ and щ in Russian have a different function than in Bulgarian. Likewise, some languages using the Latin script use orthographic transcription for all foreign names: George Walker Bush is written Džordžs Volkers Bušs in Latvian (the ending -s marks the nominative case of masculine names, see Latvian declension) and Corc Volker Buş in Azerbaijani.

The table below shows examples of phonetic transcription of the name of the former Russian president known in English as Boris Yeltsin, followed by accepted orthographic transcriptions in various languages.

The same words are likely to be transcribed differently under different systems. For example, the Mandarin Chinese name for the capital of the People's Republic of China is Beijing using the commonly used contemporary system Hànyǔ Pīnyīn, but in the historically significant Wade–Giles system, it is written Pei-Ching.

Practical transcription can be done into a non-alphabetic language too. For example, in a Hong Kong newspaper, George Bush's name is transliterated into the two Chinese characters 布殊, which are pronounced Bou3-syu4 in Cantonese (Jyutping) and Bù-shū in Mandarin (pinyin); the morphemes expressed by the respective characters otherwise mean "cloth" and "special". Similarly, many words from English and other Western European languages are borrowed in Japanese and are transcribed using Katakana, one of the Japanese syllabaries.

== Subsequent divergence ==
After transcribing a word from one language to the script of another language:

- one or both languages may develop further. The original correspondence between the sounds of the two languages may change, and so the pronunciation of the transcribed word develops in a different direction from the original pronunciation.
- the transcribed word may be adopted as a loanword in another language with the same script. This often leads to a pronunciation and spelling which are different from a direct transcription.

This is especially evident for Greek loanwords and proper names. Greek words were historically first transcribed to Latin (according to their old pronunciations), and then loaned into other languages, and finally the loanword has developed according to the rules of the target language. For example, Aristotle is the currently used English form of the name of the philosopher whose name in Greek is spelled ̓Aριστoτέλης (Aristotélēs), which was transcribed to Latin Aristoteles, from where it was loaned into other languages and followed their linguistic development. (In "classical" Greek of Aristotle's time, lower-case letters were not used, and the name was spelled ΑΡΙΣΤΟΤΕΛΗΣ.)

Pliocene, a much more recent word, comes from the Greek words πλείων (pleiôn, "more") and καινóς (kainós, "new"), which were first transcribed (Latinised) to plion and caenus and then loaned into other languages. (⟨κ⟩ became ⟨c⟩ because there was no ⟨k⟩ in Latin.)

When this process continues over several languages, it may fail to convey the original pronunciation. One ancient example is the Sanskrit word dhyāna ("contemplation", "meditation") which was transcribed into the Chinese word 禪那 (Old Chinese pronunciation djan naːl (according to the Zhengzhang Shangfang reconstruction), Middle Chinese pronunciation dzyen na) in the translations of Buddhist scriptures; next the word was shortened into 禪 dzyen, which was borrowed as ゼン zen [dzen] in Japanese (cf. Zen Buddhism), whereas the pronunciation shifted further to chán in Mandarin Chinese. The Japanese word was transcribed to zen in English.

Another issue is any subsequent change in "preferred" transcription. For instance, the word describing a philosophy or religion in China was popularized in English as Tao and given the termination -ism to produce an English word Taoism. That transcription reflects the Wade–Giles system. More recent Pinyin transliterations produce Dao and Daoism. (See also Daoism–Taoism romanization issue.)

== Transcription and transliteration example: "Boris Yeltsin" ==
Original Russian text	Борис Николаевич Ельцин
Official transliteration ISO 9 (GOST 7.79-2000)	Boris Nikolaevič Elʹcin
Scholarly transliteration	Boris Nikolaevič Elʼcin
IPA phonetic transcription	[bɐˈɾʲis nʲɪkɐˈɫajɪvʲɪt͡ɕ ˈjelʲt͡sɨn]
Examples of the same name rendered in other orthographic systems (sorted by language families; Indo-European languages come first)
Albanian	Boris Nikollajeviç Jellcin
Armenian	Բորիս Նիկոլաևիչ Ելցին (approx. translit. Boris Nikolaewičʿ Elcʿin)
Bulgarian / Macedonian	Борис Николаевич Елцин
Serbo-Croatian	Boris Nikolajevič Jeljcin + Борис Николајевич Јељцин
Slovene / Czech	Boris Nikolajevič Jelcin
Slovak	Boris Nikolajevič Jeľcin
Polish	Borys Nikołajewicz Jelcyn
Ukrainian	Борис Миколайович Єльцин
Latvian	Boriss Nikolajevičs Jeļcins
Lithuanian	Boris Nikolajevič Jelcin (Lithuanian form: Borisas Nikolajevičius Jelcinas)
English	Boris Nikolayevich Yeltsin
German	Boris Nikolajewitsch Jelzin
Dutch / Norwegian	Boris Nikolajevitsj Jeltsin
Swedish / Danish	Boris Nikolajevitj Jeltsin
Greek	Μπορίς Νικολάγιεβιτς Γιέλτσιν (approx. translit. Borís Nikoláyevits Yéltsin)
Mahl	ބޮރިސް ނިކޮލަޔެވިޗް ޔެލްސިން (approx. translit. Boris Nikolayevich Yelsin)
Sanskrit / Hindi	बोरिस् निकोलायेविच् येल्त्सिन् (approx. translit. Boris Nikolāyevic Yeltsin)
Spanish	Borís Nikoláyevich Yeltsin
Portuguese	Boris Nicoláievitch Iéltsin
Catalan	Borís Nikolàievitx Ieltsin
French	Boris Nikolaïevitch Ieltsine
Arabic	بوريس نيكولايڤيتش يلتسن (approx. translit. Bwrys Nykwlāyvytsh Yltsn)
Hebrew	בוריס ניקולאיביץ' ילצין (approx. translit. Bwrys Nyḳwlaybyṣ' Ylṣyn)
Vietnamese	Bô-rít Ni-cô-lai-ê-vích En-xin
Filipino	Boris Nikoláyevits Yeltsin
Tamil	போரிஸ் நிக்கொலாயவிச் யெல்ட்சின் (approx. translit. Pōris Nikkolāyavic Yelṭciṉ)
Japanese	ボリス・ニコライェヴィッチ・イェリツィン (approx. translit. Borisu Nikorayevitchi Yeritsin)
Korean	보리스 니콜라예비치 옐친 (approx. translit. Boriseu Nikollayebichi Yelchin)
Thai	บอริส นีโคลาเยวิช เยลต์ซิน (approx. translit. Bxris̄ Nīkholāyewich Yelt̒sin)
Chinese (Mandarin)	鲍里斯·尼古拉耶维奇·叶利钦 + Bàolǐsī Nígǔlāyēwéiqí Yèlìqīn (pinyin. This is actually phonetic transcription)
Turkish / Azerbaijani	Boris Nikolayeviç Yeltsin
Uzbek	Boris Nikolayevich Yelsin
Turkmen	Boris Nikolaýewiç Ýelsin
Hungarian	Borisz Nyikolajevics Jelcin
Finnish	Boris Nikolajevitš Jeltsin
Estonian	Boriss Nikolajevitš Jeltsin

== See also ==
- Interlinear gloss
- Phonetic spelling
- Phonetic transcription
- Romanization
- Speech recognition
- Subtitle (captioning)
- Transliteration
