= Florena =

Florena may refer to:

- 3518 Florena, minor planet
- Florena Budwin (1844–1865), soldier in the American Civil War
- Florena Shale, stratigraphic unit of North America
- Florena, brand; see Nivea

== See also ==
- Florina (disambiguation)
