= Latvian prepositions =

This article describes the use of prepositions and postpositions in Latvian grammar.

The lists below are organized according to the case of the noun phrase following the preposition. In the plural, however, all prepositions in Latvian can be described as governing the dative case. For example:

- singular: bez manis/~~*man~~ "without me-gen/~~*me-dat~~"
- plural: bez mums/~~*mūsu~~ "without us-dat/~~*us-gen~~"

== Examples ==
Latvian	English approximate	Case	Frequency	Example phrase	Translation
aiz	behind	genitive	172	Paslēpties aiz liela koka Apspriede notika aiz slēgtām durvīm	To hide behind a large tree The discussion took place behind closed doors
bez	without	genitive	446		
kopš	since	genitive	133		
no	from	genitive	3524	Skaitīt no viens līdz desmit	To count from one to ten
pēc	after	genitive	980	Pēc darba braucu uz mājām Pēc diviem mēnešiem būs pārbaudījumi	After work I go home After two months there will be a test
pie	at, on, to	genitive	1275	Māja pie jūras	A house on the sea
pirms	before (time or location with time connotation).	genitive	0	Viņš stāvēja pirms manis rindā	he stood before me in line
uz	to, on (location)	genitive	3664		
virs	above, over	genitive	191	Mati virs galvas Uzraksts virs durvīm	Hair over the head The inscription above the door *
zem	under	genitive	106		
ap	around, about, ca.	accusative	72		
ar	with	accusative	4682		
caur	through	accusative	106	Jāt caur mežu Smaidīt caur asarām	To ride through the forest To smile through the tears
gar	along	accusative	24		
pa	by, in, on, during	accusative	637	Iet pa ceļu Pa naktīm	To walk along the road During night *
pār	over, across	accusative	63	Pār upi	Across the river
par	about	accusative	4328		
pret	against	accusative	407		
starp	between	accusative	191	Galds atrodas starp skapi un logu Sēdēt starp draugiem	The table is situated between the cabinet and the window To sit among friends
uz	to, towards	accusative	3664		
līdz	until	dative	619		

  - some nouns are singular in English but plural in Latvian (e.g. durvis "door"), thus triggering the dative case.

=== Archaic forms ===
Latvian	English approximate	Case	Example phrase	Translation
apakš	under	genitive		
ārpus	beside, out of	genitive		
iekšpus	inside	genitive		
lejpus	below	genitive		
otrpus	across, beyond, on the other side (of), over	genitive		
šaipus	on this side (of)	genitive		
viņpus	in other side	genitive		
virspus	above, on	genitive		
iekš	in	genitive		
iz	from, out of	genitive	iz apakšzemes	from the underworld
priekš	for (location wise)	genitive		

== Semi-prepositions ==
Latvian has also some adverbs, known as pusprievārdi "semi-prepositions", which can be used like prepositions or postpositions, in combination with a dative noun phrase:

- cauri - through
- garām - past, over, by
- iepretim - in front of
- līdzi - with
- pāri - over, across
- pretī - in front of, against

== Postpositions ==
The following postpositions govern the genitive case, in both singular and plural:

- dēļ - through, of, for
- labad - for, for the sake of
- pēc - because of

== See also ==
- Latvian declension
