= Klaartje =

Klaartje is a given name. Notable people with the name include:

- Klaartje Liebens (born 1995), Belgian tennis player
- Klaartje Quirijns (born 1967), Dutch film and television director and producer
