= Reed Brody =

American human rights lawyer (born 1953)

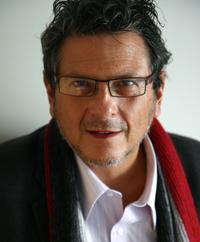
- Born: July 20, 1953 (age 73); Budapest, Hungarian People's Republic
- Education: Fairleigh Dickinson University (BA); Columbia University School of Law (JD)
- Employers: International Commission of Jurists (1987–1992); Human Rights Watch (1998–2016)
- Notable work: To Catch a Dictator: The Pursuit and Trial of Hissène Habré (2022)

Reed Brody (born July 20, 1953, Budapest, Hungary) is a Hungarian-American human rights lawyer and prosecutor. He specializes in helping victims seek justice against abusive leaders for atrocities and has gained fame as the "Dictator Hunter." He served as counsel for the victims in the case of the exiled former dictator of Chad, Hissène Habré, who was convicted of crimes against humanity in Senegal. Brody has also worked with the victims of Augusto Pinochet and Jean-Claude “Baby Doc” Duvalier. He currently works with victims of the former dictator of Gambia, Yahya Jammeh, is a lawyer for the ousted president of Niger Mohamed Bazoum and is a member of the United Nations Group of Human Rights Experts on Nicaragua. He is the author of several books, including To Catch a Dictator: The Pursuit and Trial of Hissène Habré (2022).

== Early life and education ==
Brody was born in Budapest, Hungary on July 20, 1953. His father, Ervin Brody, a Hungarian Jew, who was a major influence in his life, survived forced labor in German camps during World War II, eventually escaping to join the Soviet Red Army and participate in the liberation of Budapest before emigrating to the United States and teaching at Fairleigh Dickinson University. His mother, Francesca Cash, was an artist and an arts teacher at a Brooklyn inner-city school.

Brody received his Bachelor of Arts in political science from Fairleigh Dickinson University where he was student government president and a leader in the anti-Vietnam War movement. He earned his J.D. degree from Columbia University School of Law. While a law student, Brody worked a year in Paris as a teaching assistant at the Université de Paris (Panthéon-Sorbonne). Brody holds an honorary doctorate from Fairleigh Dickinson University and was awarded a Public Interest Achievement Award by Columbia University Law School.

== Career ==
After graduating, Brody was the New York State Assistant Attorney General from 1980 to 1984. In this position, he authored consumer protection laws and advocated on behalf of consumers and workers in class action-type suits against large corporations and financial institutions. He was called "the leading expert in the country on career-counseling malpractices.”

Brody left his position as Assistant Attorney General to research and uncover a pattern of atrocities against Nicaraguan civilians by US-funded "contras." His report, Contra Terror in Nicaragua, received national front-page coverage and led to U.S. Congressional hearings and a temporary halt to contra funding. Brody conducted a speaking tour of over 60 U.S. cities and appeared as co-counsel with the Center for Constitutional Rights in litigation in U.S. federal court to stop U.S. aid to contras. His report was also introduced into evidence in the case Nicaragua v. United States at the International Court of Justice in The Hague. He was criticized by United States President Ronald Reagan, who described him as a Sandinista "sympathizer."

From 1987 until 1992, Brody worked for the International Commission of Jurists in Geneva, as the Director of its Centre for the Independence of Judges and Lawyers (CIJL), where he organized campaigns on behalf of harassed and detained jurists and engaged in high-level regional and national seminars on the independence of numerous judiciary systems around the world. He helped draft the UN Basic Principles on the Role of Lawyers which were adopted in 1991 and the same year was one of the advocates for the creation of the UN Working Group on Arbitrary Detention. Together with P. N. Bhagwati, former Chief Justice of India, he assisted the government of Mongolia on behalf of the United Nations in preparing its 1991 constitution.

In 1992, Brody became Executive Director of the International Human Rights Law Group (which became Global Rights), where he served until 1994 placing activists in-country to train and empower locally based rights advocates in a dozen countries. In 1993, he was spokesman for the more than 3,000 NGO representatives at the UN World Conference on Human Rights in Vienna. Brody then served as Director of the Human Rights Division of the United Nations Observer Mission in El Salvador (ONUSAL) from 1994 until 1995, where he led a staff of human rights officers and police observers responsible for verifying respect for human rights, monitoring compliance with peace accords, and coordinating international support to El Salvador’s judiciary and Human Rights Ombudsman. He was also a member of the UN Preliminary Mission to establish a human rights verification mission in Guatemala (MINUGUA) in 1994.

In 1995, Brody helped found the Bureau des Avocats Internationaux in Haiti to prosecute human rights crimes committed during de facto military rule. The investigations he began led to the convictions of 57 military and paramilitary officers for the "Raboteau Massacre," the most significant rights prosecution in Haitian history.

Brody served as media liaison for the exiled Tibetan Women's Delegation at the 1995 UN Women’s Conference in Beijing whose harassment by the Chinese authorities became one of the symbols of the conference. In 1995, he was expelled from occupied East Timor by Indonesian authorities. He led an Amnesty International fact-finding mission to Sierra Leone (1996). As former Executive Secretary, he was a coordinator of the International Commission of Jurists' report Tibet: Human Rights and the Rule of Law, published in 1997. He was a member of the U.S. National Criminal Justice Commission, which produced The Real War on Crime, published in 1996.

In 1997, Brody was Deputy Director of the United Nations Secretary General’s Investigative Team in the Democratic Republic of the Congo, charged with probing atrocities committed by troops loyal to Laurent Kabila.

== Human Rights Watch ==
Brody was with Human Rights Watch from 1998 to 2016 and was an integral part of the organization’s efforts to hold perpetrators of large-scale human rights violations accountable for their crimes. Most notably, Brody directed Human Rights Watch’s participation in the landmark case of former Chilean dictator Augusto Pinochet before the British House of Lords. Brody called the Lords’ decision in the Pinochet case – that the Chilean did not enjoy immunity and could be prosecuted on the basis of universal jurisdiction despite his status as a former head of state – a "wake-up call" to tyrants and a “spark of hope for victims.” In the wake of the Pinochet case, Brody began working with victims to pursue other former exiled leaders including Hissène Habré of Chad, Mengistu Haile Mariam of Ethiopia, Jean-Claude Duvalier and Raul Cédras of Haiti, and Idi Amin of Uganda. He wrote the Human Rights Watch booklet The Pinochet Precedent: How Victims can Pursue Human Rights Criminals Abroad. Brody also participated in the 1998 Rome Conference which led the creation of the International Criminal Court.

Brody was an observer at the 2012 trial of Spanish judge Baltasar Garzón for refusing to apply Spain’s amnesty law and proceeding with an investigation into atrocities committed under Francisco Franco and during Spain’s civil war. Judge Garzón is best known for using the doctrine of universal jurisdiction to investigate war crimes and torture across national lines, most notably ordering the arrest of Chilean dictator Augusto Pinochet and seeking to indict members of the Bush administration for their role in torturing prisoners. Although Garzón was acquitted in the Franco-era trial, on 9 February 2012, the Supreme Court of Spain convicted Judge Garzón of illegally wiretapping conversations to discover evidence of illicit money laundering tactics being used by suspects and their lawyers.

In April 2010, Brody spoke at a rally of over 60,000 in Madrid’s Puerta del Sol, noting the irony that Judge Garzón was prosecuted for attempting to apply the very principles that he had successfully promoted internationally. Brody expressed indignation that Judge Garzón was the first judge in Spain to be put on trial for ordering wiretaps.

In 2010, he assisted the Haitian government in building the case against former dictator Jean-Claude "Baby Doc" Duvalier, and he co-authored the HRW report Haiti's Rendezvous with History: The Case of Jean-Claude Duvalier. He is featured in a video on the case produced by Human Rights Watch.

Brody attended legal proceedings at the US naval base in Guantanamo Bay, Cuba in 2010. He is author of the July 2011 HRW report Getting Away with Torture which examined the impunity of former US President George W. Bush and other top officials for the widespread mistreatment of Muslim prisoners, and of the book Faut-il Juger George Bush? based on the report. His other HRW reports on counter-terrorism issues include The Road to Abu Ghraib (June 2004), which investigated the roots of the prisoner abuse scandal and The United States’ 'Disappeared' (October 2004), which looked at the long-term incommunicado detention of al-Qaeda leaders in "secret locations".

== Hissène Habré case ==
Since 1999, Brody has worked with the victims of Hissène Habré, the former dictator of Chad, to bring him and his accomplices to justice. Habré is convicted of thousands of political killings and systematic torture when he ruled Chad from 1982 to 1990 before fleeing into exile in Senegal.

Habré was first indicted by a Senegalese judge in 2000, and in 2001 Brody and his colleague Olivier Bercault uncovered the files of Habré’s political police in an abandoned building in Chad, which revealed the names of 1,208 people who were killed or died in detention, and 12,321 victims of arbitrary detention and other abuses. But for the next 12 years, the Senegalese government of President Abdoulaye Wade subjected the victims to what the Nobel Peace Prize winner Archbishop Desmond Tutu described as an “interminable political and legal soap opera” which forced the victims to seek justice in Belgium, and would involve the United Nations Committee against Torture, the Court of Justice of the Economic Community of West African States (ECOWAS), the African Union and the International Court of Justice. After what the Toronto Globe and Mail called “one of the world’s most patient and tenacious campaigns for justice" waged by the victims with Brody’s support, Habré’s trial by a special African Union-backed court in Senegal finally began on July 20, 2015 and ended on February 11, 2016. On May 30, 2016, the court convicted Habré for crimes against humanity, including torture, rape and sexual slavery, and sentenced him to life imprisonment. It was the first time ever that a former head of state had been prosecuted for human rights crimes in the courts of another country. The New York Times, among others, hailed the case as “a Milestone for justice in Africa.” On April 27, 2017, an appeals court confirmed the verdict and ordered Habré to pay approximately US$130 million in victim compensation. It mandated an African Union trust fund to raise the money by searching for Habré’s assets and soliciting contributions.

Also as a result of the victims’ campaign, on March 25, 2015, a Chadian criminal court convicted 20 Habré-era security agents on charges of murder, torture, kidnapping and arbitrary detention. The court also awarded 75 billion CFA francs (US$119 million) in reparations to 7,000 victims, ordering the government to pay half and the convicted agents the other half.

Since the verdicts, Brody has continued to work with the victims for implementation of the courts’ reparation decisions. In February 2024, following a meeting between President Déby and three Chadian victims’ associations, the government began making payments of US$16.5 million (10 billion CFA francs) to 10,700 victims, including prison survivors and the families of those who were killed under Habré, who will each receive 925,000 CFA ($1,529). This is less than 10 percent of what the courts in Senegal and Chad had awarded. The victims’ associations have welcomed the payments but insisted on their right to more complete compensation.

In 2022, Brody published a book about the case, To Catch a Dictator: The Pursuit and Trial of Hissène Habré. The Washington Post called the book “An absorbing saga that raises a disturbing question: How do brutal fascists like Habré and other murderous heads of state evade a courtroom reckoning for so long after falling from power?”

In October 2024, as he was about to give a public conference in Chad to present the French edition of his book, “La Traque de Hissène Habré: Juger un dictateur dans un monde d'impunité,” the Chadian police interrupted the event. His passport was confiscated and armed men escorted him to the offices of the secret service, the Direction générale du renseignement et de l'investigation (DGRI) where he was held in police custody for two hours before being expelled on an Air France flight to Paris. The authorities have given no explanation for their actions. The speculation is that the current head of state, Mahamat Idriss Déby Itno, is seeking to repatriate Hissène Habré's remains from Senegal, and to “rehabilitate” him in order to consolidate the support of the Gorane community, the former dictator's ethnic group, from which the head of state is also descended through his mother.

== Post-HRW ==
Brody is active in human rights causes in the United States. In October 2016, he represented the journalist Amy Goodman, host of the television and radio show Democracy Now!, who was charged with criminal offenses for her reporting on an attack against Native American-led anti-pipeline protesters at Standing Rock, North Dakota. The charges were dropped.

In January 2017, Brody was elected to the International Commission of Jurists. He is also on the Boards of Democracy for the Arab World Now (DAWN), the Rose Lokissim Association and the European Center for Constitutional and Human Rights.

In 2017, he began working with victims of the former dictator of Gambia, Yahya Jammeh, who is now in exile in Equatorial Guinea. Brody organized a meeting between the victims of Hissène Habré and the victims of Yahya Jammeh and helped launch the “Campaign to Bring Yahya Jammeh and his Accomplices to Justice”- (“#Jammeh2Justice"). In May 2018, he spearheaded an investigation which revealed that 56 West African migrants, mostly from Ghana, had been killed by a death squad taking orders from Jammeh. His June 2019 investigation uncovered a state-sponsored system in which women were brought to Jammeh who then abused them and reported the cases of three women who accused Jammeh of rape and sexual abuse. These investigations fed into the work of Gambia’s landmark Truth, Reconciliation and Reparations Commission (TRRC) which in 2021 recommended that Jammeh and his henchmen be prosecuted.

Brody also worked with the Gambia Bar Association on a series of multi-stakeholder consultations beginning in 2019 to examine how to follow up on any prosecution recommendations by the TRRC. These discussions resulted in a consensus in favor of a “hybrid” court, anchored on a treaty with ECOWAS. In 2023, the Gambia government and ECOWAS took on board the proposal and created a joint task force to work towards a hybrid tribunal to prosecute the worst crimes of the Jammeh era.

Brody coordinates the international legal team for the president of Niger Mohamed Bazoum who was ousted in a military coup in July 2023. Bazoum and held captive by his former security guards in an isolated wing of the presidential palace since the coup.

In December 2023, Brody was an observer on behalf of The International Commission of Jurists (ICJ) at the decision by the Hof van Justitie, the highest court in Suriname, confirming the conviction of former president Desi Bouterse for the 1982 murders of 15 political prisoners. According to Brody, “That the law caught up to Bouterse, after 41 years, is a tribute to the courage and independence of Surinamese judges, the perseverance and tenacity of the victims’ families, and the resilience of what the Surinamese proudly call rechtsstaat, the rule of law." Bouterse absconded after the verdict, however, and his whereabouts are unknown.

In September 2024, the President of the UN Human Rights Council appointed Brody as member of the Group of Human Rights Experts on Nicaragua to examine human rights violations in Nicaragua since April 2018 and identify those responsible. For Brody, whose international career began investigating crimes committed by anti-Sandinista rebels, it represented a full circle.

Brody, who currently lives in Barcelona and a small village near Carcassonne, is a regular commentator on French and Spanish media on issues of war crimes, international relations and US politics.

== Publications and academia ==
In addition to “To Catch a Dictator,” Brody has authored Faut-il Juger George Bush?, The Pinochet Papers: The Case of Augusto Pinochet in Britain and Spain, Tibet: Human Rights and the Rule of Law, and Contra Terror in Nicaragua. His articles have appeared in the New York Times, the Washington Post, Los Angeles Times, Boston Globe, Le Monde, Le Soir, and El País, among others.

Brody has taught law as a lecturer and adjunct professor at Columbia University Law School and American University’s Washington College of Law and been a guest lecturer at the law schools of Cornell, Georgetown, Harvard, NYU, Wisconsin and Yale.

== Appearances in films and media ==
Brody’s work has been featured in documentaries including “The trial of Hissène Habré, an inconvenient ally” (Al-Jazeera/France24, 2016), Le Chasseur de Dictateurs (France 2, Complément d'enquête, 2011), Le Chasseur de Dictateurs: Jean-Claude Duvalier (Radio Canada TV, 2011), Hissène Habré: La Traque d’un Dictateur (Canal+, France, 2009), and The Dictator Hunter (directed by Klaartje Quirijns, 2007). Brody has also appeared as an actor in the feature films of his life partner Isabel Coixet, notably “Endless Night” (2015).

He has been profiled in the New York Times ("A 'Bounty Hunter' in Search of Human Justice", October 3, 2002), the Wall Street Journal ("Pinochet Is Freed, But No Ex Dictator Should Feel Safe", March 3, 2000), BBC (“The Dictator Hunter”, May 19, 2016), Jeune Afrique (Dix choses à savoir sur Reed Brody, « le chasseur de dictateurs » qui cible Yahya Jammeh), El Periódico de Catalunya ("Así se caza a un dictador", August 24, 2019), The Daily Telegraph (“Meet the Gambia dictator who ruled with fear, murder and juju... And the man determined to bring him to justice”, June 29, 2018), Le Monde ("Reed Brody, chasseur de dictateurs", January 6, 2006), National Public Radio ('Dictator Hunter' Brody: 'It's A Pleasure, September 26, 2013), Al-Jazeera (South2North - Hunting for justice, August 31, 2013), La Repubblica ("Il cacciatore di dittatori che insegue il Pinochet nero", March 17, 2006), VSD ("Reed Brody, infatigable chasseur de dictateurs", December 19–25, 2007), La Croix ("Rencontre avec...Reed Brody inlassable défenseur des droits de l'homme", September 4, 2004), The National Post (“'Dictator Hunter' vows to bring despots — such as the former ruler of Chad — to trial for human rights abuses”, December 27, 2013), El País (“Una víctima siempre querrá que castiguen al asesino de su padre”, June 16, 2014), El Mundo ('Como judío, la política israelí con los palestinos me deprime', July 20, 2014), El Periódico de Catalunya (“Reed Brody: «España ya no es el templo de la justicia universal»”, July 20, 2014), Esquire (Spain) (Ejecutivo del mes, October 2014), Tages-Anzeiger (“«Die Welt ist kleiner geworden für Diktatoren»”, March 24, 2014), le Nouvel Observateur (“Hissène Habré condamné : le combat de Reed Brody, tombeur de dictateurs”, July 15, 2015), TF1 (Qui est Reed Brody, le "chasseur de dictateur" ?), Le Monde (“Reed Brody, le « chasseur de dictateurs » qui a conduit Hissène Habré devant ses juges », July 17, 2015), Jot Down, and El País Semanal.

== Books ==
=== As author ===
- Contra Terror in Nicaragua: Report of a Fact-Finding Mission, September 1984–January 1985 (South End Press, 1985)
- To Catch a Dictator: The Pursuit and Trial of Hissène Habré (Columbia University Press, 2022)

=== As editor ===
- The Pinochet Papers: The Case of Augusto Pinochet in Spain and Britain (edited with Michael Ratner; Kluwer Law International, 2000)
