= Chiara Fiorini =

Swiss painter and object artist

Chiara Fiorini (born 1 February 1956) is a Swiss painter and object artist who lives in Zürich.

== Early life ==
Born in Acquarossa, Chiara Fiorini grew up in the Italian part of Switzerland and attended primary and secondary school there. In 1978 she received a diploma from University of Fribourg. After that she studied art at the École d'art Martenot and graduated from it in 1981. Then she got a diploma from the École Nationale Supérieure des Beaux-arts in 1983 in Paris.

== Life and Work ==
Chiara Fiorini has been living in Zurich since 1983 and her art encompasses paintings, collages and artistic installations. Her works of art, installations and objects have been shown in exhibitions throughout Europe.

Apart from Fiorini's paintings, in which she uses mixed techniques, her work often involves objects from daily life. This approach led, for example, to her using countless sugar-cubes in her sculpture Made in Sugar or hundres of needle-points in an object for an exhibition in Sarajevo. In Chiara Fiorini's art works many different objects are used, such as garden furniture covered in grass oder intricately decorated sculptures made of knitted plastic.

== Solo exhibitions ==
2026	Jedlitschka Gallery	Zurich
2023	Arte es Musica, Bibliomedia	Biasca (TI)
2022	Nellimya Arthouse	Aranno (TI)
2021	Jedlitschka Gallery	Zürich
2021	Casa Pelli	Aranno (TI)
2019	Jedlitschka Gallery	Zürich
2019	Atelier Titta Ratti	Malvaglia (TI)
2018	Galerie Kunst im West	Zürich
2017	Galerie Noseland	Schöftland
2016	Widmertheodoridis, Mir war nach Grün	Eschlikon (TG)
2015	Art Station Isabella Lanz	Zürich
2014	Lebewohlfabrik	Zürich
2013	Art Station Isabella Lanz	Zürich
2012	Galerie Salone Piazza Grande	Curio (TI)
2010	Widmer+Theodoridis Contemporary	Zürich
2009	ArtBox 33, Invitation au voyage	Thalwil
2009	Grange de Villoison	Villabé, F
2009	Galerie Sylva Denzler	Zürich
2008	Galerie Kunst im West	Zürich
2006	Galerie Ursula Wiedenkeller	Zürich
2005	Art Galerie Rorschach	Rorschach
2005	Lebewohlfabrik	Zürich
2003	Galerie Ursula Wiedenkeller	Zürich
2002	Galerie Ursula Wiedenkeller	Zürich
2001	Galerie Christine Brügger	Bern
2000	Galerie Ursula Wiedenkeller	Zürich
1999	Casa Cavalier Pellanda	Biasca (TI)
1998	Galerie Christine Brügger	Bern
1997	Galerie Ursula Wiedenkeller	Zürich
1995	Galerie Ursula Wiedenkeller	Zürich
1992	Galerie d’Art International	Paris
1992	Galerie Ursula Wiedenkeller	Zürich
1992	Spazio XXI	Bellinzona
1989	Galerie Ursula Wiedenkeller	Zürich
1987	Galerie Ursula Wiedenkeller	Zürich
1986	Château de Vuillerens	Vuillerens (VD)
1986	Praxis Bückert – Ramer	Zürich-Oerlikon
1985	Galerie du Stalden	Fribourg
1984	Galerie d’Art International	Chicago
1983	Galerie d’Art International	Paris
1982	Galerie Deschamps	Louviers, F
1982	Palais de l’Europe	Le Touquet, F
1981	Galerie d’Art International	Paris
