= Latvian grammar =

Grammar of the Latvian language

The Latvian language is an extensively inflected language, with complex nominal and verbal morphology. Word order is relatively free, but the unmarked order is subject–verb–object. Latvian has pre-nominal adjectives and both prepositions and postpositions. There are no articles in Latvian, but definiteness can be indicated by the endings of adjectives.

== Nouns and adjectives ==
Latvian has two grammatical genders (masculine and feminine) and seven cases; there are no articles. Adjectives generally precede the nouns they modify, and agree in case, number, and gender. In addition, adjectives take distinct endings to indicate definite and indefinite interpretation:

Viņa nopirka [vecu māju]. "She bought [an old house]."
Viņš nopirka [veco māju]. "He bought [the old house]."

For details about the nominal morphology of Latvian (inflection of nouns, pronouns, numerals, and adjectives), see Latvian declension.

== Verbs ==
=== Tenses and moods ===
Latvian has three simple tenses (present, past and future), and three compound perfect constructions: present perfect, past perfect, future perfect.

Latvian verbs are used in five moods:

- indicative;
- imperative;
- conditional;
- conjunctive (Latvian literature, however, does not make a distinction between conditional and conjunctive. Even if such a distinction is made both of them are morphologically identical – ending in -u.);
- quotative, also known as relative, renarrative, or inferential mood (some authors distinguish analytically derived jussive as a subset of quotative; others, however, insist that a simple addition of a conjunction (lai) is not sufficient basis for distinguishing this grammatical construction as a grammatical mood); and
- debitive (for expressing obligation).

The relations between tenses and moods are shown in the following table. (The table does not include quotative.)

	Indicative	Imperative	Conditional	Conjunctive	Debitive
Simple present	✓	✓	✓	✓	✓
Simple past	✓	✗	✗	✗	✓
Simple future	✓	✗	✗	✓	✓
Present perfect	✓	✗	✓	✓	✓
Past perfect	✓	✗	✗	✗	✓
Future perfect	✓	✗	✗	✓	✓

Latvian verbs have two voices, active and passive. The passive voice is analytic, combining an auxiliary verb (tikt "become", būt "be", or more rarely, tapt "become") and the past passive participle form of the verb. Reflexive verbs are marked morphologically by the suffix -s.

=== Conjugation classes ===
Unlike, for example, Romance languages where conjugation classes are assigned based on thematic vowels (e.g., -are, -ere, -ire forming, respectively, the 1st, 2nd and 3rd conjugation in Italian) Latvian verbs are classified in conjugations regardless of whether they end in -āt, -ēt, -īt, -ot or -t. The classification depends on whether the verb stem has a thematic vowel, and if so, whether it is retained in present tense.

==== First conjugation ====
The first conjugation class is characterized by an absence of the thematic vowel in infinitive, as well as in present and past tenses. Furthermore 1st conjugation verbs are always monosyllabic and their stems undergo sound shifts. Based on these sound shifts they are further divided in 5 subcategories.

Sound shifts bolded below

Conjugation of celt 'raise'
	INDICATIVE (īstenības izteiksme)				IMPERATIVE (pavēles izteiksme)
		Present (tagadne)	Past (pagātne)	Future (nākotne)	IMPERATIVE (pavēles izteiksme)
1st pers. sg.	es	ce**ļ**u	c**ē**lu	celšu	—
2nd pers. sg.	tu	cel	c**ē**li	celsi	cel
3rd pers. sg.	viņš, viņa	ce**ļ**	c**ē**la	cels	lai ce**ļ**
1st pers. pl.	mēs	ce**ļ**am	c**ē**lām	celsim	celsim
2nd pers. pl.	jūs	ce**ļ**at	c**ē**lāt	celsiet, celsit	celiet
3rd pers. pl.	viņi, viņas	ce**ļ**	c**ē**la	cels	lai ce**ļ**
RENARRATIVE (atstāstījuma izteiksme)			PARTICIPLES (divdabji)		
Present	ce**ļ**ot		Present Active 1 (Adj.)		ce**ļ**ošs
Past	esot c**ē**lis		Present Active 2 (Adv.)		celdams
Future	celšot		Present Active 3 (Adv.)		ce**ļ**ot
Imperative	lai ce**ļ**ot		Present Active 4 (Obj.)		ce**ļ**am
CONDITIONAL (vēlējuma izteiksme)			Past Active		c**ē**lis
Present			Present Passive		ce**ļ**ams
Past	būtu c**ē**lis		Past Passive		celts
DEBITIVE (vajadzības izteiksme)			NOMINAL FORMS		
Indicative	(būt) jāce**ļ**		Infinitive (nenoteiksme)		
Conjunctive 1	esot jāce**ļ**		Negative Infinitive		
Conjunctive 2	jāce**ļ**ot		Verbal noun		celšana

==== Second conjugation ====
The second conjugation class is characterized by retaining the thematic vowel in infinitive, past as well as present. 1st person singular present and past tenses coincide.

Conjugation of strādāt
	INDICATIVE (īstenības izteiksme)				IMPERATIVE (pavēles izteiksme)
		Present (tagadne)	Past (pagātne)	Future (nākotne)	IMPERATIVE (pavēles izteiksme)
1st pers. sg.	es	strād**ā**ju	strād**ā**ju	strād**ā**šu	—
2nd pers. sg.	tu	strād**ā**	strād**ā**ji	strād**ā**si	strād**ā**
3rd pers. sg.	viņš, viņa	strād**ā**	strād**ā**ja	strād**ā**s	lai strād**ā**
1st pers. pl.	mēs	strād**ā**jam	strād**ā**jām	strād**ā**sim	strād**ā**sim
2nd pers. pl.	jūs	strād**ā**jat	strād**ā**jāt	strād**ā**siet, strād**ā**sit	strād**ā**jiet
3rd pers. pl.	viņi, viņas	strād**ā**	strād**ā**ja	strād**ā**s	lai strād**ā**
RENARRATIVE (atstāstījuma izteiksme)			PARTICIPLES (divdabji)		
Present	strād**ā**jot		Present Active 1 (Adj.)		strād**ā**jošs
Past	esot strād**ā**jis		Present Active 2 (Adv.)		strād**ā**dams
Future	strād**ā**šot		Present Active 3 (Adv.)		strād**ā**jot
Imperative	lai strād**ā**jot		Present Active 4 (Obj.)		strād**ā**jam
CONDITIONAL (vēlējuma izteiksme)			Past Active		strād**ā**jis
Present	strād**ā**tu		Present Passive		strād**ā**jams
Past	būtu strād**ā**jis		Past Passive		strād**ā**ts
DEBITIVE (vajadzības izteiksme)			NOMINAL FORMS		
Indicative	(būt) jāstrād**ā**		Infinitive (nenoteiksme)		
Conjunctive 1	esot jāstrād**ā**		Negative Infinitive		
Conjunctive 2	jāstrād**ā**jot		Verbal noun		strād**ā**šana

==== Third conjugation ====
Verbs of the third conjugation class retain the thematic vowel in infinitive and past, however, it is absent in present and the stem takes on the full set of endings unlike 1st and 2nd conjugation where 2nd person singular and 3rd person present endings -i and -a are either absent or have given way to the thematic vowel.

Conjugation of lasīt
	INDICATIVE (īstenības izteiksme)				IMPERATIVE (pavēles izteiksme)
		Present (tagadne)	Past (pagātne)	Future (nākotne)	IMPERATIVE (pavēles izteiksme)
1st pers. sg.	es	lasu	las**ī**ju	las**ī**šu	—
2nd pers. sg.	tu	lasi	las**ī**ji	las**ī**si	lasi
3rd pers. sg.	viņš, viņa	lasa	las**ī**ja	las**ī**s	lai lasa
1st pers. pl.	mēs	lasām	las**ī**jām	las**ī**sim	las**ī**sim
2nd pers. pl.	jūs	lasāt	las**ī**jāt	las**ī**siet, las**ī**sit	lasiet
3rd pers. pl.	viņi, viņas	lasa	las**ī**ja	las**ī**s	lai lasa
RENARRATIVE (atstāstījuma izteiksme)			PARTICIPLES (divdabji)		
Present	lasot		Present Active 1 (Adj.)		lasošs
Past	esot las**ī**jis		Present Active 2 (Adv.)		las**ī**dams
Future	las**ī**šot		Present Active 3 (Adv.)		lasot
Imperative	lai lasot		Present Active 4 (Obj.)		lasām
CONDITIONAL (vēlējuma izteiksme)			Past Active		las**ī**jis
Present	las**ī**tu		Present Passive		lasāms
Past	būtu las**ī**jis		Past Passive		las**ī**ts
DEBITIVE (vajadzības izteiksme)			NOMINAL FORMS		
Indicative	(būt) jālasa		Infinitive (nenoteiksme)		
Conjunctive 1	esot jālasa		Negative Infinitive		
Conjunctive 2	jālasot		Verbal noun		las**ī**šana

The 3rd conjugation is divided into 2 subgroups, the 1st one containing the thematic vowel ī, and the 2nd subgroup – all other vowels. The only difference between the two subgroups is that verbs belonging to the 2nd subgroup do not take on the 3rd person present tense ending -a. dziedāt, es dziedu, tu dziedi but viņš dzied unlike viņš lasa.

Conjugation of dziedāt
	INDICATIVE (īstenības izteiksme)				IMPERATIVE (pavēles izteiksme)
		Present (tagadne)	Past (pagātne)	Future (nākotne)	IMPERATIVE (pavēles izteiksme)
1st pers. sg.	es	dziedu	dziedāju	dziedāšu	—
2nd pers. sg.	tu	dziedi	dziedāji	dziedāsi	dziedi
3rd pers. sg.	viņš, viņa	dzied	dziedāja	dziedās	lai dzied
1st pers. pl.	mēs	dziedam	dziedājām	dziedāsim	dziedāsim
2nd pers. pl.	jūs	dziedat	dziedājāt	dziedāsiet, dziedāsit	dziediet
3rd pers. pl.	viņi, viņas	dzied	dziedāja	dziedās	lai dzied
RENARRATIVE (atstāstījuma izteiksme)			PARTICIPLES (divdabji)		
Present	dziedot		Present Active 1 (Adj.)		dziedošs
Past	esot dziedājis		Present Active 2 (Adv.)		dziedādams
Future	dziedāšot		Present Active 3 (Adv.)		dziedot
Imperative	lai dziedot		Present Active 4 (Obj.)		dziedam
CONDITIONAL (vēlējuma izteiksme)			Past Active		dziedājis
Present	dziedātu		Present Passive		dziedams
Past	būtu dziedājis		Past Passive		dziedāts
DEBITIVE (vajadzības izteiksme)			NOMINAL FORMS		
Indicative	(būt) jādzied		Infinitive (nenoteiksme)		
Conjunctive 1	esot jādzied		Negative Infinitive		
Conjunctive 2	jādziedot		Verbal noun		dziedāšana

==== Irregular verbs ====
Beside the three conjugations, there are three verbs characterized by different stems in present, past as well as infinitive. These verbs are referred to as "irregular" (nekārtni or neregulāri.) Irregular verbs and their stem changes are:

- būt (esmu, biju) – to be (I am, I was)
- iet (eju, gāju) – to go (I go, I went)
- dot (dodu, devu) – to give (I give, I gave)

A verb's conjugation pattern can be deduced from three base forms: the infinitive form, the present stem and the past stem. The following table shows the correspondence between the base stem and the tense/mood.

stem	moods and tenses derived from this stem
**present stem**	present indicative, imperative mood, debitive mood, present participles (except participle present active 2)
**past stem**	imperfect, past active participle
**infinitive stem**	infinitive, future indicative, conditional mood, future conjunctive, participle present active 2, past passive participle

== Literature ==
- Ceplīte, B.; Ceplītis, L. (1991). Latviešu valodas praktiskā gramatika [Practical Grammar of the Latvian Language] (in Latvian). Rīgā: Zvaigzne ABC.
- Dini, Pietro U. (1997). Le Lingue Baltiche [The Baltic Languages] (in Italian). Scandicci (Florence): La Nuova Italia Editrice.
- Endzelīns, J. (1951). Latviešu valodas gramatika [Latvian Grammar] (in Latvian). Rīgā: Latvijas Valsts Izdevniečiba.
- Akademija Andreja Upisa Valodas un Literaturas (1959). Mūsdienu latviešu literārās valodas gramatika [Modern Literary Latvian Language Grammar] (in Latvian). Riga: LPSR ZA izdevniecība.
- Fennell, T. G.; H. Gelsen (1980). A Grammar of Modern Latvian (Vols. 1–3). Mouton.
- Kalnača, Andra; Lokmane, Ilze (2021). Latvian Grammar. Rīga: University of Latvia Press. doi:10.22364/latgram.2021. ISBN 978-9934-18-635-6.
- Karulis, K. (2001). Latviešu etimoloģijas vārdnīca [Latvian Etymology Dictionary]. Rīga: Avots.
- Mathiassen, Terje (1996). A Short Grammar of Latvian. Columbus, OH: Slavica. ISBN 0-89357-270-5.
- Petit, Justyna; Petit, Daniel (2004). Parlons letton [Let's Speak Latvian] (in French). Paris: L'Harmattan. ISBN 2-7475-5910-6.
- Prauliņš, Dace (2012). Latvian: An Essential Grammar. London: Routeledge. ISBN 9780415576925.
