= Florina (disambiguation) =

Florina is a city in Greece.

Florina may also refer to:

- Florina (constituency), an electoral district in Greece
- Florina (regional unit), an administrative unit in Greece
- Florina (name), a female Romanian given name
- Florina (planet), a planet in Isaac Asimov's Foundation universe
- Florina (apple), an apple cultivar
- Florina, a character from the video game Fire Emblem: The Blazing Blade on Game Boy Advance

== See also ==
- Florinas, a city in Sardinia, Italy
