= Klaartje Quirijns =

Dutch film and television director and producer

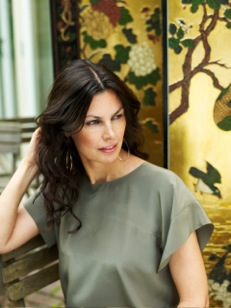
- Born: 1967 (age 58–59); Amsterdam, Netherlands
- Occupations: Director producer
- Awards: CINE Golden Eagle Trophy (2005); Courmayeur Noir Film Festival (Italy, 2007); Première Berlinale (2012); Prix Italia (2012)
- Website: www.klaartjequirijns.com

Klaartje Quirijns (born 1967 in Amsterdam, Netherlands) is a Dutch film and television director and producer. In The Netherlands she worked as a documentary director and producer for the public stations VPRO, IKON and NPS.

Internationally, Quirijns got recognition for her documentaries The Brooklyn Connection (2005), The Dictator Hunter (2007), with Souleymane Guengueng and Peace vs. Justice (2011), a documentary about the Lord's Resistance Army and Anton Corbijn Inside Out (2012). While pursuing independent documentary projects, Quirijns continues to work as a correspondent for Dutch national radio and television.

== Early life and career ==
Quirijns was based in New York City between 1997 and 2007, Quirijns lives with her family in London, United Kingdom. In 2013, Quirijns began to direct fiction films. Her first work was Speelman, a story of a marriage, which premièred at the Dutch Film Festival in the Netherlands.

== Filmography ==
=== Documentaries ===
- The Brooklyn Connection (2005) - in this documentary she interviewed Kosovan-born American gun runner Florin Krasniqi, and accompanied him on a purchase of weapons from an Army Surplus store.
- The Dictator Hunter (2007) - Quirijns portrays the American human rights lawyer Reed Brody over the course of three years. Brody is after Chad's former dictator Hissène Habré. The documentary premiered at the Toronto International Film Festival and received nominations for the European Film Awards and won several awards.
- Peace vs Justice (2011) - in this documentary Quirijns visualises the tensions between the International Criminal Court in The Hague, Netherlands and the Lord's Resistance Army
- Anton Corbijn Inside Out (2012) - Over three years, Quirijns traveled the world with internationally acclaimed pop photographer Anton Corbijn. In this documentary she unveils Corbijns complex being. Sacrificing his private life versus his career, his articicity versus his large audience and recognition versus loneliness. Anton Corbijn Inside Out premiered at the Berlin International Film Festival.

=== Movies ===
- Speelman (2013) - Quirijn's first fiction film. A story of a marriage, which premiered at the Dutch Film Festival in the Netherlands.

=== In production ===
- The Dictator Hunter, a fiction film based on her documentary (2007 The Dictator Hunter). (produced by Anne Carey written by Michael Bronner (Captain Phillips and Greenzone)
- They Fuck You Up, a film, drawing on psychoanalysis, about the roles we play, scripted by our family and how we might break through these patterns by understanding them. (produced by Pieter van Huystee)
- Ten White Geese, a full-length fiction film based on a book by Gerbrand Bakker, a Dutch writer that has also received high acclaim internationally, including winner of the Independent Foreign Fiction Prize 2013. (produced by Jeroen Beker and Els Vandervorst)

== Awards ==
The Brooklyn Connection (2005)

- CINE Golden Eagle Trophy, 2005
- The Dictator Hunter (2007)
- Nomination Zilveren Wolf, IDFA, 2007
- Nomination 'best documentary' European Film Awards, 2008
- Best Documentary Courmayeur Noir Film Festival, (Italy) 2007

Anton Corbijn Inside Out (2012)

- Première Berlinale, 2012
- Prix Italia, 2012 in Music and Arts Documentary
