= Florina (name) =

Florina is a given name.

Some people with the name:

- Florina Alías (1921–1999), Spanish writer in Asturian language
- Florina Herea (born 1979), a Romanian freestyle swimmer
- Florina Kaja (born 1982), a reality television participant
- Florina Pașcalău (born 1982), a Romanian basketball center
- Florina Pana (born 1973), a Romanian long-distance runner
- Florina Bârsan-Chintoan (born 1985), a Romanian handball player
- Florina Rodov (born 1982), a Russian-American writer
