= Florin Krasniqi =

Kosovar-Albanian-American businessman

Florin Krasniqi (born June 26, 1964) is a Kosovar-Albanian-American businessman, political activist and former arms smuggler. He served as deputy of the Vetëvendosje! political movement in the Kosovan Assembly between 2010 and 2014.

== Background ==
Krasniqi was born in Kosovo, when it was part of the former Yugoslavia. He was a mathematics high-school teacher in the town of Vranoc, Peja when he fled to the United States, sneaking across the border from Mexico in the trunk of a white Cadillac on Christmas Eve, 1988, aged 24. He began as a roofer and later founded Triangle General Contractors, a roofing company in Brooklyn, New York. In 1998-99, he raised $30 million from the Albanian community in the United States for the Kosovo Liberation Army (KLA) and smuggled hundreds of high-powered American sniper rifles to Kosovo for guerrillas, which were distributed by his extended family clan in the region. A cousin, Xhevdet, and a nephew, Adrian, were among the founding members of the KLA and helped smuggle weapons into the region. An engineering student in Pristina in 1996, Adrian purportedly lost faith in Kosovo's government and joined a cell of the KLA, heading up the rebels' weapons-smuggling operation. Adrian was reportedly the first guerrilla to die in a KLA uniform.

== Business ventures ==
Krasniqi is the owner of Kosova Steel Group. He had been involved in the construction of a multimillion-dollar hydroelectric power plant, Kozhner Hydro Power Plant (Lumbardhi), of which he is still reportedly a part owner.

== Personal life ==
Krasniqi met his Polish-born wife Danuta in Brooklyn in 1990. She hoped to run into him again by calling the cab company where he worked whenever she needed a ride. After several months of trying, a cab showed up with Krasniqi behind the wheel. They married in 1997 and have three children Ariana, Monika, and Erik.

== Publications ==
Several books were written regarding Krasniqi's exploits, such as:

- Be Not Afraid, for You Have Sons in America: How a Brooklyn Roofer Helped Lure the U.S. into the Kosovo War — written by Stacy Sullivan and was published in 2004 (ISBN 0-312-28558-2).
- The Brooklyn Connection: How to Build Your Own Guerrilla Army — written by Stacy Sullivan and was made into a film by PBS, directed by Dutch director Klaartje Quirijns, who accompanied Krasniqi one day as he went shopping at an Army/Navy surplus store. He was also profiled on 60 Minutes and in at least one article in The New York Times.

== Quotes ==
- "Anything you need to run a small guerrilla army, you can buy here in America. You have all the guns you need here to fight a war. M-16s. That's what the U.S. soldiers carry in Iraq. All the rifles which U.S. soldiers use in every war, you can buy them in a gun store or a gun show." — Florin Krasniqi
- "After Sept. 11, he realized 'If I could do this, who else could do this?'" — director Klaartje Quirijns, explaining why KLA gun runner Florin Krasniqi decided to let the filmmaker tell his story of how he (mostly) legally bought tons of guns in the United States and shipped them abroad. Many of the guns were obtained from such outlets as Barrett Firearms and Schwarzman Surplus.
