= Fiorina =

Fiorina may refer to:

== People with the surname ==
- Alejandro Fiorina (born 1988), an Argentine footballer
- Betty Fiorina (1919–2010), an American politician
- Carly Fiorina (born 1954), business executive and 2016 presidential candidate
- Morris P. Fiorina (born 1946), political scientist and author

== Other uses ==
- Fiorina (San Marino), a village in San Marino
- Fiorina 161, a fictional planet and the setting of Alien 3
- Fiorina la vacca (Fiorina the Cow), a 1972 film directed by Vittorio De Sisti
- Fiorina, an 1851 opera by Carlo Pedrotti

== See also ==
- Fiorino (disambiguation)
- Fiorini (disambiguation)
