= Fiorino =

Fiorino may refer to:

- The fiorino d'oro or florin, gold currency of the Republic of Florence
- Fiat Fiorino, a van manufactured by Fiat Motors
- Tuscan fiorino, the currency of Tuscany between 1826 and 1859
- Fiorino, Montescudaio, an Italian village in the province of Pisa, Tuscany
- Fiorino Bianco, politician in Montreal, Quebec, Canada
- Fiorino (restaurant), in Vancouver, Canada

== See also ==
- Fiorina (disambiguation)
- Fiorini (disambiguation)
