= Florin, Pennsylvania =

Unincorporated community in Pennsylvania, U.S.

Coordinates: 40°06′30″N 76°31′59″W

Florin was known for being a stop off the Main Line (Pennsylvania Railroad). The Lancaster County, Pennsylvania, United States, populated place uses the zip code 17552. The locality is located within East Donegal Township.
