= Florin sign =

Currency sign

ƒ

Florin sign
- In Unicode: U+0192 ƒ LATIN SMALL LETTER F WITH HOOK (&fnof;)

The florin sign (ƒ) is a symbol that is used for the currencies named florin, also called guilder. The Dutch name for the currency is gulden. The symbol "ƒ" is the lowercase version of Ƒ of the Latin alphabet. (Note: The representative glyph actually shown here is determined by the reader's web browser and may not in fact have the characteristic long curved descender and inclined form. The lower case letter f in the italic form of most serif typefaces (resulting, for example f) may be more suitable if a more accurate computer font is not readily available.) It may be emulated with a normal italic small-letter f in most serif typefaces or function symbol in LaTeX notation ( f, $f$).

It is used in the following current and obsolete currencies (between brackets their ISO 4217 currency codes):

Current:

- Aruban florin (AWG)

Obsolete:

- Dutch guilder (NLG; until 2002)
- Netherlands Indies guilder (until 1954)
- Surinamese guilder (SRG; until 2004)
- Italian florin (until 1533)
- Netherlands Antillean guilder (ANG; until 2025)

== In Unicode ==
There is no explicit 'florin symbol' in the Currency Symbols (Unicode block). Although that proposal was made, it does not appear to have succeeded. Instead, it is given as one of the possible alternative uses of U+0192 ƒ LATIN SMALL LETTER F WITH HOOK in the table "Latin Extended-B: Non-European and historic Latin".

== See also ==
- F with hook – Latin letter used in some African orthographies
