= Florinus =

Florinus can refer to:

- Florin, a coin
- Florinus, presbyter at Rome, one of the Fathers of Christian Gnosticism
- Florinus of Remüs, 9th-century saint
- Henrik Florinus (1633–1705), Finnish priest, writer and translator
