= Latvian declension =

Declensions in the Latvian language

In the Latvian language, nouns, adjectives, pronouns and numerals are inflected in six declensions. There are seven cases:

- nominative (nominatīvs)
- genitive (ģenitīvs)
- dative (datīvs)
- accusative (akuzatīvs)
- instrumental (instrumentālis)
- locative (lokatīvs)
- vocative (vokatīvs)

== Nouns ==
Latvian has two grammatical genders, masculine and feminine.

Latvian nouns can be classified as either declinable or indeclinable. Most Latvian nouns are declinable, and regular nouns belong to one of six declension classes (three for masculine nouns, and three for feminine nouns).

Latvian nouns have seven grammatical cases: nominative, genitive, dative, accusative, instrumental, locative and vocative. The instrumental case is always identical to the accusative in the singular, and to the dative in the plural. It is used as a free-standing case (i.e., in the absence of a preposition) only in highly restricted contexts in modern Latvian. (See below for a true prepositional case, the ablative.)

=== Masculine declensions ===
The three masculine declensions have the following identifying characteristics:

- 1st declension: nom. sing. in -s or -š, thematic vowel -a- (e.g. vīrs < *wī́ˀras, "man, husband")
- 2nd declension: nom. sing. in -is (or -ns/-ss, see below), thematic vowel -i- (e.g. skapis "wardrobe")
- 3rd declension: nom. sing. in -us, thematic vowel -u- (e.g. tirgus "market, bazaar")

The full paradigms of endings for the three declensions is given in the following table:

| | 1st decl. | | 2nd decl. | | 3rd decl. | |
| | Sing. | Plur. | Sing. | Plur. | Sing. | Plur. |
|---|---|---|---|---|---|---|
| Nom. | vīrs | vīri | skapis | skapji | tirgus | tirgi |
| Gen. | vīra | vīru | skapja | skapju | tirgus | tirgu |
| Dat. | vīram | vīriem | skapim | skapjiem | tirgum | tirgiem |
| Acc. | vīru | vīrus | skapi | skapjus | tirgu | tirgus |
| Ins. | vīru | vīriem | skapi | skapjiem | tirgu | tirgiem |
| Loc. | vīrā | vīros | skapī | skapjos | tirgū | tirgos |
| Voc. | vīr | vīri | skapi | skapji | tirgu | tirgi |

The 2nd declension exhibits palatalization of the final stem consonant in the genitive singular and throughout the plural (p → pj in the example above, but see below for full details). Exceptions to this include compound nouns and proper names ending in -dis or -tis (e.g. Atis, gen. sing. Ata).

A small subclass of 2nd declension nouns have identical nominative and genitive singular (most of them ending in -ens). These are part of the so-called consonant stem nouns: e.g. akmens "stone", asmens "blade", mēness "moon", rudens "autumn", sāls "salt", ūdens "water", and zibens "lightning". The 2nd declension noun suns "dog" has the regular genitive singular suņa.

=== Feminine declensions ===
The three feminine declensions can be characterized as follows:

- 4th declension: nom. sing. in -a, thematic vowel -a- (e.g. sieva "woman, wife")
- 5th declension: nom. sing. in -e, thematic vowel -e- (e.g. upe "river")
- 6th declension: nom. sing. in -s, thematic vowel -i- (e.g. nakts < *náktis "night")

The full paradigms of endings for the three declensions is given in the following

| | 4th decl. | | 5th decl. | | 6th decl. | |
| | Sing. | Plur. | Sing. | Plur. | Sing. | Plur. |
|---|---|---|---|---|---|---|
| Nom. | sieva | sievas | upe | upes | nakts | naktis |
| Gen. | sievas | sievu | upes | upju | nakts | nakšu |
| Dat. | sievai | sievām | upei | upēm | naktij | naktīm |
| Acc. | sievu | sievas | upi | upes | nakti | naktis |
| Ins. | sievu | sievām | upi | upēm | nakti | naktīm |
| Loc. | sievā | sievās | upē | upēs | naktī | naktīs |
| Voc. | sieva | sievas | upe | upes | nakts | naktis |

The final stem consonant is palatalized in the genitive plural of 5th and 6th declension nouns (in the examples above, p → pj and t → š, but see the next section for full details). Exceptions to this include loanwords such as epizode (gen. pl. epizodu) in the 5th declension and a handful of words in the 6th declension: acs "eye", auss "ear", balss "voice", zoss "goose".

The 4th and 5th declensions include a number of masculine nouns (e.g. puika "boy", or proper names such as Dilba, Zvaigzne), or common gender nouns that are either masculine or feminine depending on their use in context (e.g. paziņa "acquaintance", bende "executioner"). Some surnames (e.g. Klints) belong to the 6th declension for both masculine and feminine. In these cases, the masculine nouns take the same endings as given in the table above, except in the dative singular:

- 4th decl.: -am (e.g. dat. sing. puikam "boy")
- 5th decl.: -em (e.g. dat. sing. bendem "male executioner", cf. bendei "female executioner")
- 6th decl.: -im (e.g. dat. sing. Klintim for male surname, cf. Klintij for female surname)

The 6th declension noun ļaudis "people" is masculine. It has no singular forms, only regular plural forms.

=== Consonant shift (stem-final iotation and palatalization) ===
Some of the case endings given in the declension tables above begin with an underlying palatal approximant - /j/. This is true of the 2nd declension genitive singular (ending -ja), all forms of the 2nd declension plural, and the genitive plural of the 5th and 6th declensions (ending -ju).

In Latvian literature this process is collectively referred to as līdzskaņu mija, i.e., consonant shift. Jotēšana (cf. German Jotisierung), i.e., iotation can be further distinguished as a subcategory. In English Academia the term "iotation" is often used to refer to properties of Eastern Slavic vowels wherein they acquire an underlying /j/ which palatalizes the preceding consonants regardless of their position within a word which is similar to the phenomenon of assimilative palatalization of consonants in Lithuanian. Latvian however does not have assimilative palatalization of consonants and the term "iotation" is used strictly in the sense of stem-final labial consonants being "affixed with an iota" (i.e., the letter ⟨J⟩) in 2nd, 5th and 6th declension nouns.

| change | nom. sing. (not iotated) | gen. plur. (iotated) | translation |
|---|---|---|---|
| p → pj | upe | upju | "river" |
| b → bj | gulbis | gulbju | "swan" |
| m → mj | zeme | zemju | "land" |
| v → vj | dzērve | dzērvju | "crane" |
| f → fj | žirafe | žirafju | "giraffe" |

Besides labial consonants (/p, b, m, v, f/) that are iotated, coronal consonants (/n, t, d, s, z, l/, see below on /r/) and affricates (/ts, dz/) and their clusters can be said to undergo palatalization. Thus, for example, plain Latvian ⟨L⟩ (similar to the standard value of /l/ in American English or if not proceeded by a front vowel - Brazilian Portuguese, sometimes distinguished as "dark L" - /ɫ/) is palatalized to ⟨Ļ⟩, a palatal lateral approximant - /ʎ/.

| change | nom. sing. (unpalatalized) | gen. plur. (palatalized) | translation |
|---|---|---|---|
| c → č | lācis | lāču | "bear" |
| d → ž | briedis | briežu | "deer" |
| l → ļ | brālis | brāļu | "brother" |
| n → ņ | dvīnis | dvīņu | "twin" |
| s → š | lasis | lašu | "salmon" |
| t → š | nakts | nakšu | "night" |
| z → ž | vāze | vāžu | "vase" |
| sn → šņ | krāsns | krāšņu | "stove" |
| zn → žņ | zvaigzne | zvaigžņu | "star" |
| sl → šļ | kāpslis | kāpšļu | "stirrup" |
| zl → žļ | zizlis | zižļu | "baton" |
| ln → ļņ | vilnis | viļņu | "wave" |
| ll → ļļ | lelle | leļļu | "doll" |
| nn → ņņ | pinne | piņņu | "acne" |
| st → š | rīkste | rīkšu | "rod" |

==== History, exceptions and umlaut ====
After the Soviet occupation of Latvia minor reforms were made to Latvian orthography, namely the use of long ⟨ō⟩, the ⟨ch⟩ digraph and the use of "softened" ⟨ŗ⟩ were abolished. The use of ⟨ō⟩, ⟨ch⟩ and ⟨ŗ⟩ is often collectively referred to as “Endzelīns’ orthography.” The abolition of diacriticized ⟨ŗ⟩ effectively makes the trill sound (/r/) the only coronal consonant that does not undergo stem-final consonant shift.

For example, the gen.pl. of cepure "hat" is cepuru (but may be pronounced cepuŗu). It is, however, still used among people of Latvian origin and books outside of Latvia.

Proponents of ⟨ŗ⟩ point out that it aids in distinguishing a number of homographic heterophones and helps distinguishing the so-called "open ⟨e⟩" (/æ/) and "close ‹e›" (/e/) and prevents the appearance of their alternations in nominal paradigm (referred to as umlaut (pārskaņa), metaphony (metafonija) and other names such as regresīvā vokāļu harmonizācija, etc.)

| Nominative | Old orthography | New orthography | /e/ or /æ/ (IPA) | Tone (Latvian notation: /~/ - level, /^/ - broken) | Translation |
|---|---|---|---|---|---|
| mēris | mēŗa | mēra | /meːra/ | mẽra | Gen.Sing. plague |
| mērs | mēra | mēra | /meːra/ | mẽra | Gen.Sing. mayor |
| mērs | mēra | mēra | /mæːra/ | mẽra | Gen.Sing. measure |
| mērīt | mēra | mēra | /mæːra/ | mẽra | 3rd Pers.Ind. - he measures |
| bērt | bēru | bēru | /beːru/ | bêru | I poured (sand, grain, etc.) |
| bēres | bēŗu | bēru | /bæːru/ | bêru | Gen.Pl. funeral |
| bēris | bēŗu | bēru | /beːru/ | bẽru | Gen.Pl. a bay horse |

The use of ⟨ŗ⟩ has it that gen.sing. "plague" mēŗa would be distinguishable from gen.sing. "measure" mēra and bēŗu would not show umlaut being pronounced with a close /eː/ like the rest of its paradigm. Further, besides the 5th declension plurale tantum noun bēres ("funeral") another word that would have stem final consonant shift can be introduced - 2nd declension bēris ("a bay horse") both their gen.pl. will be bēŗu if ⟨ŗ⟩ is used. One could argue that the appearance of umlaut in gen.pl. "funeral" now allows to distinguish it from gen.pl. "bay horse" (assuming the latter is not subjected to umlaut), however, the more common occurrence of the words "I poured (a granular substance)" and "of funeral" becoming perfect homophones is likely to be seen as a net-loss by proponents of ‹ŗ›.

In Latvian literature it is usually assumed that open /æ/ is the underlying value of e which became the more close /e/ when followed by a palatal element - either a front vowel /i, e, iɛ, ei/ (cf. German Gast : Gäste /gast : ɡɛstə/) or the palatal approximant /j/ (the "shifted" values can always be analyzed as sums of some consonant and *j in historical terms: š < *tj, ž < *dj, etc.)

In fact, consonant shift can be viewed as a means of blocking umlaut alternations in nominal paradigm, e.g., the 5th declension in -e has front vocalic endings (-e, -es, -ei, -ēm, etc.) in all cases except pl.gen. which has the back vowel -u and pl.gen. happens to be the only case where consonant shift takes place for this declension (the 2nd declension in -is is not as immediately obvious because the modern pl.nom. ending -i is a front vowel which should not require consonant shift to block possible umlaut, however, it likely originates from an earlier back vocalic ending *-ai explaining the consonant shift.)

Some suggest that the abolition of Endzelīns' orthography in 1946 and 1957 was motivated by the fact that after the occupation Soviet authorities were promoting Russian-born Latvians for positions in the new administration, who, in turn, were not familiar with the developments that had taken place during the decades of independence.

During the Soviet rule one could observe what might seem motivation to simplify consonant shift further. Thus, for example, in a 1971 book by Aldonis Vēriņš Puķkopība ("Horticulture") the pl. gen. of narcise ("daffodil") is consistently spelled narcisu instead of narcišu.

A 2000 handbook on Latvian orthography lists the following words as exceptions to consonant shift due to reasons of euphony.

| nom.sing./nom.pl. | gen.sing./gen.pl. | translation |
|---|---|---|
| Guntis | Gunta | Guntis (name) |
| Atis | Ata | Atis (name) |
| viesis | viesu | guest |
| gaišmatis | gaišmatu | a light-haired person |
| tālskatis | tālskatu | telescope |
| pase | pasu | passport |
| gāze | gāzu | gas |
| mute | mutu | mouth |
| kaste | kastu | box, carton |
| torte | tortu | cake |
| azote | azotu | bosom |
| acs | acu | eye |
| auss | ausu | ear |
| balss | balsu | voice |
| dzelzs | dzelzu | iron |
| valsts | valstu | country, state |
| zoss | zosu | goose |
| debesis | debesu | sky |

This list is far from exhaustive. 2nd declension two-syllable male names with stems ending in ‹d,t› never undergo consonant shift (Uldis, Artis, Gatis, and so forth.) Besides body parts (acs, auss) there is a number of other words that historically do not undergo consonant shift, e.g., the name of the town of Cēsis. Words with stem-final -st are not subject to consonant shift this includes all feminine forms of -ist nouns (e.g., feministe and so forth.) Further in a number of words consonant shift has been dropped to avoid homophony, thus gen.pl. of "passport" pase would be homophonous with "of (our-, your-, their-) selves" pašu, the same goes for gāze "gas" which would be homophonous with 1st pers. indicative of the verb gāzt "to topple." Perhaps only a small number could be genuinely attributed to euphony, e.g., gaišmaša due to two concomitant /ʃ/ sounds occurring within a three-syllable word which some might find "unpleasantly sounding."

==== Dorsal consonants ====
As has been noted stem-final labial consonants undergo iotation, whereas stem-final unpalatalized coronal consonants and affricates undergo case-specific palatalization and unlike Lithuanian, Latvian does not exhibit assimilative palatalization. However, the last large group of consonants, the dorsal consonants are an exception to both of these rules. Latvian has 3 unpalatalized dorsal consonants /k/, the voiced /ɡ/ and /x/, the latter occurring only in loanwords, represented respectively by the letters ⟨K⟩, ⟨G⟩ and ⟨H⟩, as well as palatalized versions of the natively occurring ones /c/ and /ɟ/ represented by the letters ⟨Ķ⟩ and ⟨Ģ⟩ respectively.

Similar to the "hard and soft C" and "hard and soft G" distinction in many (mostly Western) European languages Latvian seeks to palatalize /k/ and /g/ when they are proceeded by front vowels (/e/ or /i/) to either:

- /ts/ or /dz/ (for native words) or
- /c/ or /ɟ/ (historically, for assimilating foreign words.)

Unlike most Western European languages where the reader is expected to predict the "softness" or "hardness" of the ⟨c⟩ and ⟨g⟩ based on whether they are proceeded by a front vowel and the orthography doesn't change (e.g., cocoa /ˈkəʊ.kəʊ/ and Cecilia /seˈsilja/ both being written with ⟨c⟩), the highly phonetic orthography of Latvian requires any such changes to be shown in writing.

As with assimilative palatalization /k/ and /ɡ/ before a front vowel (/e/ or /i/) take on their palatalized values regardless of their position in a word, furthermore, /c/ has been used historically to assimilate pre-front vowel /x/ (found in Russian) and /ç/ (found in German.) For example:

- Ķīna /ˈciːna/ from German - China /ˈçiːnaː/
- (ne)ķītrs "(in)decent" from Russian - хитр /xitr/ "sly, clever."

When /k/ or /g/ is followed by a foreign front vowel sound not present in Latvian vowel inventory and when it's changed to a front vowel the palatalization will occur as well. This is the case with German ⟨ü⟩ (/ʏ/), for example:

- ķēķis /ˈceːcis/ from Low German - Kȫke /ˈkøːke/ "kitchen";
- ķirbis /ˈcirbis/ from German - Kürbis /ˈkʏʁbɪs/ "pumpkin"

Consequently as in the case of ķēķis, for example, no stem-final consonant shift can take place, cf. milzis - milža but ķēķis - ķēķa, since the /k/ is already palatalized.

As is evident with the loan ģimene "family," from the Lithuanian language, /c/ and /ɟ/ are over-represented in borrowed lexical items. By comparing Lithuanian gimti (source of Lithuanian giminė and eventually Latvian ģimene) and Latvian dzimt ("to be born") it can be observed that replacing dorsal consonants with affricates (/k/ → /ts/, /ɡ/ → /dz/) before a front vowel is the more "native" way reserved for pre-front vowel dorsal consonant changes in native words as can be observed in Rīga → rīdzinieks, logs ("window") → palodze ("windowsill") or koks ("tree") → kociņš ("a stick.")

== Indeclinable nouns ==
Some nouns do not belong to any of the declension classes presented above, and show no case or number inflection. For the most part, these indeclinable nouns are unassimilated loanwords or foreign names that end in a vowel. Some examples are: ateljē "studio", Deli "Delhi".

== Adjectives ==
Adjectives in Latvian agree in case, number, and gender with the noun they modify. In addition, they express the category of definiteness. Latvian has no definite and indefinite articles, but the form of the adjective chosen can determine the correct interpretation of the noun phrase. For example, consider the following examples:

Viņa nopirka [vecu māju]. "She bought [an old house]."
Viņa nopirka [veco māju]. "She bought [the old house]."

In both sentences, the adjective is feminine singular accusative, to agree with the noun māju "house". But the first sentence contains the indefinite form of the adjective, while the second one contains the definite form.

=== Indefinite declension ===
Masculine indefinite adjectives are declined like nouns of the first declension, and feminine indefinite adjectives are declined like nouns of the fourth declension.

| | Masculine | | Feminine | |
| | singular | plural | singular | plural |
|---|---|---|---|---|
| Nom. | -s | -i | -a | -as |
| Gen. | -a | -u | -as | -u |
| Dat. | -am | -iem | -ai | -ām |
| Acc. | -u | -us | -u | -as |
| Loc. | -ā | -os | -ā | -ās |

=== Definite declension ===
In the history of Latvian, definite noun phrases were constructed with forms of an old pronoun *jis; traces of this form can still be seen in parts of the definite adjectival paradigm. Note that only definite adjectives are used in the vocative case. The nominative form can always be used as a vocative. If, however, the modified noun appears as a vocative form distinct from its nominative form (this can only happen with singular nouns, as can be seen from the declension tables above), then the vocative form of the adjective can optionally be identical to its accusative form in -o.

| | Masculine | | Feminine | |
| | singular | plural | singular | plural |
|---|---|---|---|---|
| Nom. | -ais | -ie | -ā | -ās |
| Gen. | -ā | -o | -ās | -o |
| Dat. | -ajam | -ajiem | -ajai | -ajām |
| Acc. | -o | -os | -o | -ās |
| Loc. | -ajā | -ajos | -ajā | -ajās |
| Voc. | -ais / -o | -ie | -ā / -o | -ās |

=== Examples ===
The declension of the adjective zils/zila "blue" is given below.

Indefinite
| | Masculine | | Feminine | |
| | singular | plural | singular | plural |
|---|---|---|---|---|
| Nom. | zils | zili | zila | zilas |
| Gen. | zila | zilu | zilas | zilu |
| Dat. | zilam | ziliem | zilai | zilām |
| Acc. | zilu | zilus | zilu | zilas |
| Loc. | zilā | zilos | zilā | zilās |

Definite
| | Masculine | | Feminine | |
| | singular | plural | singular | plural |
|---|---|---|---|---|
| Nom. | zilais | zilie | zilā | zilās |
| Gen. | zilā | zilo | zilās | zilo |
| Dat. | zilajam | zilajiem | zilajai | zilajām |
| Acc. | zilo | zilos | zilo | zilās |
| Loc. | zilajā | zilajos | zilajā | zilajās |
| Voc. | zilais / zilo | zilie | zilā / zilo | zilās |

Adjectives containing the suffix -ēj- have reduced case endings in the dative and locative. For example, vidējs, -a "central" (indefinite) has the following definite paradigm:

| | Masculine | | Feminine | |
| | singular | plural | singular | plural |
|---|---|---|---|---|
| Nom. | vidējais | vidējie | vidējā | vidējās |
| Gen. | vidējā | vidējo | vidējās | vidējo |
| Dat. | vidējam | vidējiem | vidējai | vidējām |
| Acc. | vidējo | vidējos | vidējo | vidējās |
| Loc. | vidējā | vidējos | vidējā | vidējās |
| Voc. | (= nominative) | | | |

== Pronouns ==
=== Personal pronouns ===
The third person personal pronouns in Latvian have a regular nominal declension, and they have distinct masculine and feminine forms. The first and second person pronouns, and the reflexive pronoun, show no gender distinction, and have irregular declensions.

| | Singular | | | | Plural | | | | reflexive |
| | 1st | 2nd | 3rd masc. | 3rd fem. | 1st | 2nd | 3rd masc. | 3rd fem. | reflexive |
|---|---|---|---|---|---|---|---|---|---|
| | I | you (fam.) | he/it | she/it | we | you (pol./plur.) | they | | -self/-selves |
| **Nom.** | es | tu | viņš | viņa | mēs | jūs | viņi | viņas | – |
| **Gen.** | manis | tevis | viņa | viņas | mūsu | jūsu | viņu | viņu | sevis |
| **Dat.** | man^{*} | tev^{*} | viņam | viņai | mums | jums | viņiem | viņām | sev^{*} |
| **Acc.** | mani | tevi | viņu | viņu | mūs | jūs | viņus | viņas | sevi |
| **Loc.** | manī | tevī | viņā | viņā | mūsos | jūsos | viņos | viņās | sevī |

^{*}After a preposition governing the dative (e.g. līdz "to, until"), the dative forms manim, tevim, and sevim are possible. These forms may replace genitive and accusative pronouns with other prepositions, too.

=== Possessive pronouns ===
There are five root possessive pronouns that change endings depending on the declension.

- man**s** (1st person singular) - my, mine
- tav**s** (2nd person singular) - your, yours
- viņēj**s** (archaic 3rd person singular) - his, her, their
- sav**s** (reflexive possessive) - (my, your, his, her, our, their) own
- katr**s** (reflexive possessive) - every, each, any

The below table of endings replace the bolded characters above for the various declensions,

| | Masculine | | Feminine | |
| | singular | plural | singular | plural |
|---|---|---|---|---|
| **Nom.** | -s | -i | -a | -as |
| **Gen.** | -a | -u | -as | -u |
| **Dat.** | -am | -iem | -ai | -ām |
| **Acc.** | -u | -us | -u | -as |
| **Ins.** | -u | -iem | -u | -ām |
| **Loc.** | -ā | -os | -ā | -ās |
| **Voc.*** | -s | -i | -a | -as |

- only for first person (ie. mans)

In addition to the pronouns that have different declensions, there are pronouns that stay the same in all declensions,

- viņa/viņas (3rd person singular) - his/her
- mūsu (1st person plural) - our
- jūsu (2nd person plural/formal) - your
- viņu (3rd person plural) - their

=== Other pronouns ===
The following tables show the declension of the demonstratives tas "that" and šis "this".

| | Masculine | | Feminine | |
| | singular | plural | singular | plural |
|---|---|---|---|---|
| **Nom.** | tas | tie | tā | tās |
| **Gen.** | tā | to | tās | to |
| **Dat.** | tam | tiem | tai | tām |
| **Acc.** | to | tos | to | tās |
| **Loc.** | tajā / tai / tanī | tais / tajos / tanīs | tai / tajā / tanī | tais / tajās / tanīs |

| | Masculine | | Feminine | |
| | singular | plural | singular | plural |
|---|---|---|---|---|
| **Nom.** | šis | šie | šī | šīs |
| **Gen.** | šī, šā | šo | šīs, šās | šo |
| **Dat.** | šim | šiem | šai | šīm |
| **Acc.** | šo | šos | šo | šīs |
| **Loc.** | šai / šajā / šinī | šais / šajos / šinīs | šai / šajā / šinī | šais / šajās / šinīs |

The interrogative/relative pronoun kas "who, what" has the same declension, but it has only singular forms (and no locative form, with the adverb kur "where" used instead). The same applies to forms derived from kas: nekas "nothing", kaut kas "something", etc.

The intensive pronoun pats/pati (cf. "I myself", "they themselves") is irregular:

| | Masculine | | Feminine | |
| | singular | plural | singular | plural |
|---|---|---|---|---|
| **Nom.** | pats | paši | pati | pašas |
| **Gen.** | paša | pašu | pašas | pašu |
| **Dat.** | pašam | pašiem | pašai | pašām |
| **Acc.** | pašu | pašus | pašu | pašas |
| **Loc.** | pašā | pašos | pašā | pašās |

Other pronouns and determiners exhibit regular (indefinite) adjectival declension:

- the demonstrative forms tāds/tāda "such (as that)" and šāds/šāda "such (as this)"
- the 1st and 2nd person singular possessive forms mans/mana "my", tavs/tava "your (fam.)" (and the reflexive savs/sava)
- the interrogatives kurš/kura "which", kāds/kāda "what (kind)", and indefinite pronouns derived from them, e.g. nekāds "no", kaut kāds, nezin kāds "some kind of"
- other indefinite pronouns such as dažs/daža "some, certain", cits/cita "other", viss/visa "all", (ik)katrs/(ik)katra "every", ikviens/ikviena "each"

== Numerals ==
In Latvian there are two types of numerals: cardinals and ordinals.

The numbers from 1 to 9 are declinable. The number 1 (viens/viena) combines with a singular noun, 2 (divi/divas) through 9 (deviņi/deviņas) with plural nouns. With the exception of trīs "3", these numbers take the same endings as indefinite adjectives.

| | Masculine | Feminine |
|---|---|---|
| nominative | trīs | |
| genitive | triju | |
| dative | trim, trijiem | trim, trijām |
| accusative | trīs | |
| locative | trijos, trīs | trijās, trīs |

The following cardinal numbers are indeclinable:

- the numerals 11–19: vienpadsmit, divpadsmit, trīspadsmit, četrpadsmit, piecpadsmit, sešpadsmit, septiņpadsmit, astoņpadsmit, deviņpadsmit
- desmit (10) and its compounds: divdesmit, trīsdesmit, četrdesmit, piecdesmit, sešdesmit, septiņdesmit, astoņdesmit, deviņdesmit
- simt (100) and its compounds: simt, divsimt, trīssimt, četrsimt, piecsimt, sešsimt, septiņsimt, astoņsimt, deviņsimt
- tūkstoš (1000) and its compounds: tūkstoš, divtūkstoš, trīstūkstoš, četrtūkstoš, piectūkstoš, seštūkstoš, septiņtūkstoš, astoņtūkstoš, deviņtūkstoš, etc.

Ordinal numbers ("first", "second", etc.) are declined like definite adjectives. In compound numbers, only the final element is ordinal, e.g. trīsdesmit otrajā minūtē "in the 32nd minute".

== Archaic forms ==
=== Instrumental case ===
The following table illustrates case syncretism in the Latvian instrumental form. In the singular, the instrumental is identical to the accusative. In the plural, the instrumental is identical to the dative.

Some linguists also distinguish an ablative case that is identical to the genitive in the singular and the dative in the plural.

| | 1st decl. | | 2nd decl. | | 3rd decl. | |
| | sing. | plur. | sing. | plur. | sing. | plur. |
|---|---|---|---|---|---|---|
| genitive | vīra | vīru | skapja | skapju | tirgus | tirgu |
| ablative | vīra | vīriem | skapja | skapjiem | tirgus | tirgiem |
| dative | vīram | vīriem | skapim | skapjiem | tirgum | tirgiem |
| instrumental | vīru | vīriem | skapi | skapjiem | tirgu | tirgiem |
| accusative | vīru | vīrus | skapi | skapjus | tirgu | tirgus |

The ablative is generally not presented as a separate grammatical case in traditional Latvian grammars, because it appears exclusively with prepositions. One can say instead that prepositions requiring the genitive in the singular require the dative in the plural. Also, the Latvian ablative case is not an archaism but rather an innovation.

The ablative case emerged in Latvian under the circumstances of shifting the government of almost all prepositions in the plural to the dative form. This shift was caused by the loss of the old accusative form in the singular, which became identical to the instrumental form: A.-I. vīru, kāju, māsu. In the plural, most feminine nouns had identical forms for the dative and the instrumental case. The masculine form ending in "-īs" was dropped and the dative ending was introduced there by analogy: I. vīrīs >> vīriem (<< D. vīriem). Therefore, the instrumental case merged with the dative in the plural and the accusative in the singular. Feminine nouns had in the meantime levelled their G.Sg.~N.Pl.~Acc.Pl. endings: GSg,NPl,AccPl kājas; AccSg,ISg,GPl kāju. Therefore, prepositional constructions became ambiguous: uz pļavas - "on the meadow" or "to the meadows"; uz pļavu - "on the meadows" or "to the meadow". To at least partly reduce this, the dative case was introduced after most prepositions in the plural: uz pļavas (on the meadow), uz pļavu (to the meadow), uz pļavām (on/to the meadows). Therefore, almost all the prepositions that governed the genitive started taking the dative-instrumental case in the plural, giving a new birth to the ablative case.

The instrumental case, on the other hand, cannot be eliminated so easily, because it can be used in some contexts without any preposition:

- vīrs sarkanu bārdu "a man with a red beard" (singular: instrumental = accusative)
- meitene zilām acīm "a girl with blue eyes" (plural: instrumental = dative)

=== Dual number ===
Old Latvian also had a dual number. Nowadays perhaps in some dialects the dual might be used only in some words representing body parts, e.g. divi roki, kāji, auši, akši, nāši 'two hands, legs, ears, eyes, nostrils', in such phrases like: skatīties ar abāmu akšāmu 'to look with both eyes', klausīties ar abāmu aušāmu 'to listen with both ears', ņemt ar abāmu rokāmu 'to take with both hands', lekt ar abāmu kājāmu 'to jump with both legs'.

The old dual endings of all cases:

| | Masculine | | | Feminine | | | |
| | 1.decl. | 2.decl. | 3.decl. | 4.decl. | 5.decl. | 6.decl. | 7.decl. |
|---|---|---|---|---|---|---|---|
| Nom.Acc.Voc. | -u | -ju | -u | -i | -ji | -ji | -u |
| Abl.Dat.Ins. | -amu | -jamu | -umu | -āmu | -ēmu | -īmu | -ūmu |
| Gen.Loc. | -i | -ji | -u | -i | -ji | -ji | -u |

=== Locative case forms ===
The locative case once had three forms: inessive (the regular and most common form), illative (for example in old Latvian texts: iekš(k)an tan pirman vietan, in modern Latvian it has been replaced by the inessive, but vestiges of what once was an illative final -an changed to an -ā remain in some adverbs, e.g. āran > ārā 'outdoors, outside', priekšan > priekš 'for'), allative (only used in a few idiomatic expressions like: augšup, lejup, mājup, kalnup, šurp, turp). The later two are adverb-forming cases.

== See also ==
- Latvian conjugation
- Latvian prepositions
