= Paul Georgescu =

Romanian literary critic, journalist, fiction writer and communist

- Born: November 7, 1923; Țăndărei, Ialomița County, Kingdom of Romania
- Died: October 15, 1989 (aged 65); Bucharest, Socialist Republic of Romania
- Occupations: literary critic, journalist, novelist, short story writer
- Writing career
- Period: 1944–1989
- Genres: experimental literature, parody, novella, essay, memoir
- Literary movement: Socialist Realism, Modernism, Neorealism, Postmodernism

Paul Georgescu (Romanian pronunciation: [ˈpa.ul dʒe̯orˈdʒesku]; November 7, 1923 – October 15, 1989) was a Romanian literary critic, journalist, fiction writer and communist political figure. Remembered as both a main participant in the imposition of Socialist Realism in its Romanian form and a patron of dissenting modernist and postmodern literature, he began his career in politics during World War II, when he sided with the anti-fascist groups and the underground Romanian Communist Party in opposition to the Axis-aligned Ion Antonescu regime. During the first twenty years of Communist Romania, Georgescu assisted Leonte Răutu in exercising Stalinist control over local literature, but also published young nonconformist authors, beginning with Nichita Stănescu and Matei Călinescu, in his Gazeta Literară. Sidelined over his own incompatibility with the Socialist Realist dogma, and returning to public life during the 1960s liberalization enforced by Nicolae Ceaușescu, he became openly adverse to Ceaușescu's variety of national communism and clandestinely cultivated the prohibited ideology of Trotskyism.

During the final part of his life, Paul Georgescu became especially known as an experimental novelist, among the first postmodernists on the local scene, and, although physically impaired, one of the most prolific Romanian authors of the late 20th century. His main works of the time, including the critically acclaimed Vara baroc ("Baroque in Summer"), deal with urban and suburban life on the Bărăgan Plain, creatively parodying the work of 19th and early 20th century writers. While admired for his contribution to fiction and his lifelong promotion of anti-dogmatic literature, Georgescu remains controversial for his political affiliations and his early participation in censorship.

== Biography ==
=== Early life and World War II ===
Georgescu was born in Țăndărei, a commune on the Bărăgan (presently included in Ialomița County). Both his parents were middle-class ethnic Romanians, his father having set up practice as a physician. From early on, he was alarmed by the rise of fascist groups, primarily the Iron Guard, adopting a Marxist perspective in reaction.

Involved in anti-fascist circles during World War II, the future writer is believed to have joined the then-illegal Romanian Communist Party (PCR) as an adolescent, and reportedly fought against the Nazi-supported Ion Antonescu regime (see Romania during World War II). Although affiliated with a party which followed a Stalinist and pro-Soviet line, the young activist may have been appreciative of Trotskyism, and this sympathy is known to have surfaced in his later years. Georgescu was a political prisoner of the Antonescu regime, said to have been because he had given shelter to a Soviet spy. He was, according to legend, sentenced to death by the authorities before turning nineteen, but managed to evade execution. His later friend and fellow author Radu Cosaşu writes that "[Paul Georgescu] had been in danger of a court-martial".

During the early stages of Soviet occupation, and before the official establishment of Communist Romania, Paul Georgescu took an active part in communization at a cultural level in general, and the establishment of a local Socialist Realist trend in particular. Researcher Ana Selejan thus lists him in the "first generation of creators, tailors and propagandists of the new literary order."

=== Political preeminence ===
In the 1950s, Georgescu became an activist of the PCR Central Committee's Agitprop section, an office which reportedly led literary circles to perceive him as the éminence grise of chief ideologues Leonte Răutu and Iosif Chişinevschi. After a restructuring of the education system, he also advanced hierarchically to the position of lecturer at the University of Bucharest Faculty of Letters. A member of the newly created Writers' Union of Romania, Georgescu was first elected to the head bureau of its Prose Section in October 1952. He was also rapporteur at the 1956 Writers' Union Congress, during which the Communist Party, using Stalinist rhetoric, condemned the cultural aspects of De-Stalinization as "formalism" and "vulgar sociologism". His texts, offering endorsement to the Romanian Socialist Realist current, were published as Încercări critice ("Critical Essays", 1957 and 1958). In March 1954, he was co-founder of Gazeta Literară, inaugurated as a Romanian equivalent to the Soviet Union's Literaturnaya Gazeta. The new publication was initially led by aging writer Zaharia Stancu, whose disagreements with the PCR leadership made the latter withdraw him from public life and assign him the honorary position of magazine director. Georgescu, who took over for Stancu as editor, published articles in the other venues of the Socialist Realist press: Contemporanul, Viaţa Românească and the PCR platform Scînteia. With Ovid Crohmălniceanu, Sergiu Fărcăşan and Petru Dumitriu, he contributed the sporadic literary chronicles at Scînteia (beginning 1953).

Paul Georgescu assumed a first-hand position in directing and promoting a young generation of writers during 1952, when he became one of the main lecturers at the newly founded School of Literature, a Writers' Union venture. In 1954, Georgescu hired Valeriu Râpeanu, at the time a student and later known for his scholarly works on 19th century poet Mihai Eminescu, to a position at Gazeta Literară. Among the other essayists specialized in literary criticism who were promoted by Georgescu as head of the magazine were Gabriel Dimisianu, Ştefan Cazimir and Nicolae Velea (the latter of whom he also encouraged to become a short story writer). By 1957, he was also in touch with Matei Călinescu, future critic and novelist, whom he first employed as Gazeta Literară proofreader. At that stage, Călinescu recalls, Georgescu developed a fondness for both him the young modernist poet Nichita Stănescu, as well as with their literary friends Cezar Baltag, Nicolae Breban, Grigore Hagiu, Modest Morariu and Petre Stoica. Although the group soon after migrated toward Anatol E. Baconsky's Cluj-based rival magazine Steaua, Georgescu is occasionally credited with having launched Stănescu by welcoming him among the prominent poets of his day. He is believed to have had a similar role in the careers of Matei Călinescu and Călinescu's Gazeta Literară companions, as well as in those of Ştefan Bănulescu and Marin Preda.

Conflicts with other sections of the Socialist Realist cultural establishment surfaced in the 1950s, when the tolerance of modernism by Gazeta Literară was officially condemned as "escapism" by Crohmălniceanu. In 1957, he further upset communist decision-makers by agreeing to publish article Incomparabilul ("The Incomparable One") by Constantin Ţoiu, which lampooned his fellow Socialist Realist author Dumitriu. Eventually, ideological disagreements with the communist apparatus made his colleagues subject him to a censure vote, and Georgescu was removed from his position at Gazeta Literară. Călinescu, who records both his disgruntlement and the definition he gave to his new condition: scriitor la domiciliu ("writer in residence"). His editorial office at Gazeta Literară was assigned to Aurel Mihale, himself succeeded by Tiberiu Utan.

=== 1960s transition ===
With the rise to power of Nicolae Ceauşescu and the onset of relative liberalization, Romanian Socialist Realism came to an end. During that stage, although hostile to the new leadership, Georgescu adapted to the requirements, a change exemplified by his 1967 collection of essays, Polivalenţa necesară ("The Necessary Plurality"), and by his 1968 novel Coborînd ("Descending"). In parallel, he published two collections of short stories: Vîrstele tinereţii ("The Ages of Youth", 1967) and 3 nuvele ("3 Novellas", 1973), the latter of which featured his acclaimed story Pilaf (named after the Oriental dish). Gazeta Literară was itself a victim of the liberalization climate, and, in 1968, was closed down to be replaced with România Literară, edited by Geo Dumitrescu.

Georgescu continued to play an important part in launching the careers of young writers. Beginning 1969, he helped novelist Norman Manea establish himself on the local scene. Between 1976 and 1986, Georgescu was in correspondence with Ion Simuţ, an aspiring critic whom the educational system of the day had assigned to a schoolteacher's position in the remote commune of Ţeţchea, Bihor County. He helped Simuţ publish his contributions in Bucharest journals, personally intervening with editors. He was in the meantime engaged in a rivalry with some main figures of the neorealist tendency, who were traditionally closer to the Ceauşescu regime: Preda, Eugen Barbu, Petru Dumitriu and Titus Popovici. During that time, he ended his collaboration with Scînteia and began contributing to România Liberă daily, which, under Octavian Paler's direction, took a certain distance from the official line. According to Manea, Georgescu's contributions to România Literară, which also hosted writers diverging from the PCR-imposed course, were "never refused". He also published two other novels: Înainte de tăcere ("Before the Silence", 1975) and Doctorul Poenaru ("Doctor Poenaru", 1976), followed in 1977 by Revelion (titled after the common word for a New Year's Eve party).

=== Final years ===
By the late 1970s, Georgescu had entered his most fecund stage as a prose writer, regularly publishing his novels at one-year intervals. At the same time, his life and career were being changed by disease. He had a malformation of the vertebral column and was already walking with a limp; in old age, his limbs were affected by ankylosis, which greatly reduced his mobility, and he developed a tendency for obesity. According to his friend Manea, "the assault of diseases and age", coupled with resentment from Ceauşescu's "functionaries of the Dogma", had physically isolated Georgescu from his peers.

The acclaimed novels Vara baroc and Solstiţiu tulburat ("Troubled Solstice") saw print in 1980 and 1982 respectively. The former earned him the Writers' Union Prize for Prose in 1981, a ceremony which, due to his declining health, he could not attend in person. Vîrstele raţiunii ("The Ages of Reason"), a book of interviews Paul Georgescu granted to poet Florin Mugur, was also published in 1982. At that time, Georgescu was cultivating some apolitical or anti-communist authors of modernist or avant-garde literature, preferring them over the revival of nationalist and traditionalist literature in Ceauşescu's Romania. He became interested in the works of a new subversive and lyrical generation of writers, collectively known as Optzecişti, playing a special part in the promotion of their representatives Ştefan Agopian and Mircea Cărtărescu. Agopian credits the review of his 1981 novel Tache de catifea ("Tache de Velvet"), published by Georgescu in România Literară, with having established his reputation on the literary scene. Georgescu also took a sympathetic view of Târgovişte School authors such as Radu Petrescu and Mircea Horia Simionescu, of poet Mircea Ciobanu, of independent literary critic Dan C. Mihăilescu, and of modernist novelist Virgil Duda.

In 1984, Georgescu finished the first of his novels having for a common setting Huzurei (a joking allusion to his native Țăndărei, stemming from huzur, or "wanton"). Titled Mai mult ca perfectul—lit. "The More than Perfect", after a term most commonly used for the pluperfect in Romanian grammar—, it was followed two years later by Natura lucrurilor ("The Nature of Things"), in 1987 by Pontice ("The Pontics"), and in 1988 by Geamlîc ("Glass Partition").

Paul Georgescu died in October 1989, some two months before the Romanian Revolution toppled communism. He was buried on the outskirts of Bucharest, at the cemetery in Străuleşti. According to writer Bedros Horasangian, the funeral ceremony was interrupted in the hope that more people would turn up. Columnist and literary historian Nicolae Manolescu signed Georgescu's obituary in România Literară, voicing a call for moderation in assessing his colleague's career. A final volume of the Huzurei series, titled Între timp ("Meanwhile"), was published posthumously in 1990.

== Literary criticism and ideological contributions ==
=== Early militancy ===
Paul Georgescu's literary career, begun shortly after World War II and during the early stages of communization, was marked by the ideological debates of the time. Matei Călinescu judges his older colleague "a pretty typical intellectual for his generation, [which had been] polarized between a far right (the majority) and a far left (a small minority), united by a common hatred of democracy." A differing opinion is held by Norman Manea, who argues that, among the writers born in the same period, Georgescu and a few others, including the far right philosophers Mircea Eliade and Emil Cioran, stood out for compensating "the everyday banality and void", not just through literature, but also through the "collective explosion" of ideology. Călinescu, who recalls having once been "fascinated" by Georgescu, defines him as a "human puzzle", discussing his stance as a "peculiar combination of formal partisan religiosity and undissimulated cynicism". These traits, he argues, made the censor an exponent of the "perverted form" and "deceitful fanaticism" he believes characterized all communist potentates, and, through extension, advocates of "the other secular religions [...]—fascism and national-socialism."

In 1946, two years before the Romanian Kingdom's dissolution, the young journalist had written: "The critical spirit is the thermometer with which one can assess if a country's democracy is real or only verbal. The enemies of the critical spirit, and of irony, and of smiles are: stupidity, haughtiness and fascism." Manea, who argues that the Soviet Union had by then also proven itself "a ferocious enemy of democracy and the critical spirit", believes Georgescu was using "the great ideas" of Humanism to entice the"fascination" of intellectuals, thus withdrawing support from the idea of liberal democracy. At the end of this process, the writer assesses, concepts such as those praised by Georgescu in his 1946 text became "irrelevant, if not also ridiculous, absurd, grotesque."

=== Communist censor ===
Literary historian Florin Mihăilescu includes him among the "most vigilant ideological censors", a category also grouping Ovid Crohmălniceanu, Nicolae Moraru, Mihai Novicov, Traian Șelmaru, Ion Vitner and others. With them and others, Georgescu took part in campaigns to verify the commitment various writers maintained toward Socialist Realist guidelines. In one such case, occurring in 1952–1953, he joined the Scînteia editors in their campaign to silence criticism of debutant poet Eugen Frunză, condemning his own magazine Viaţa Românească and Anatol E. Baconsky's Steaua for their earlier reviews. In early 1953, during the ideological crisis provoked by the death of Soviet leader Joseph Stalin, Georgescu joined other communist activists in the cultural field in endorsing the condemnation of earlier proletkult guidelines on the basis of guidelines provided by Georgy Malenkov. In his pieces for Viaţa Românească, Georgescu gave negative reviews to several young writers of the day: poet Nina Cassian, whom he argued was a "formalist" who had failed to rally with "combative poetry"; Baconsky, whom, he argued, made recourse to "a high-flown style", used by the author to cover his "unfamiliarity with life and lack of ideas"; and Baconsky's colleague at Steaua, Mircea Zaciu, whose satirical works, he contended, popularized "unhealthy aspects". Such comments, literary researcher Ana Selejan notes, contributed to Baconsky being "blacklisted" by the cultural establishment. Cassian, who recalls that the book Georgescu reviewed was "my most proletkultist", and her attempt to recover from being marginalized by communist politicos, accuses the critic of having "compromised" her, of pursuing "an indication from the Party [...], coupled with his own well-known cynicism", and of resorting to "ad hominems".

According to political scientist Vladimir Tismăneanu, Georgescu stood alongside Crohmălniceanu, Baconsky, Geo Bogza, Geo Dumitrescu, Petru Dumitriu, Gheorghe Haupt, Eugen Jebeleanu, Mihail Petroveanu and Nicolae Tertulian as one of the few genuine left-wing intellectuals associated with the regime during the 1950s. The researcher emphasizes their failure to join the pro-liberalization initiatives of Miron Constantinescu, Mihail Davidoglu, Alexandru Jar and Vitner, all of whom had called for De-Stalinization at a time when PCR general secretary Gheorghe Gheorghiu-Dej was refusing to enforce it. In Tismăneanu's view, the stance adopted by Georgescu and his colleagues, together with their silence during the repressive measures adopted following the Hungarian Revolution, helped Leonte Răutu and his subordinate Mihai Beniuc maintain a grip on the Writers' Union. A particularly controversial text Paul Georgescu wrote for a May 1956 issue of Gazeta Literară reaffirmed that the Communist Party had a moral duty to exercise its "guidance" (îndrumare) on literary matters. At the Union Congress of 1956, Georgescu voiced the official condemnation of De-Stalinization in Romanian culture, calling attention to writers whose work, he argued, had strayed away from Socialist Realist guidelines and into "formalism", "idealism", "subjectivism", or "art for art's sake". In this context, the ideologue spoke of fellow critics who adopted "vulgar sociologism", which meant discussing the work of past authors independent of their social context. He called attention to supposed attempts at reviving the conservative and neoclassical tenets of the 19th century literary group Junimea through the works of its leader Titu Maiorescu, making similar claims about the legacy of post-Junimist and modernist critic Eugen Lovinescu, founder of Sburătorul review. Defining such interpretations as "reactionary" and "bourgeois", Georgescu called for a literary criticism subjected to "the sacred cause of our people, constructing socialism". Writing in 2002, Florin Mihăilescu reviewed the Congress report, concluding: "Thus, the replacement of aesthetic judgment with ideological control becomes glaring, spectacular and almost unimaginable, especially coming from a critic of unquestionable acuteness, as is Paul Georgescu."

According to Matei Călinescu, Paul Georgescu made special efforts to push Marxist-Leninist rhetoric and conclusions into the texts of non-communist authors he reviewed for publishing, in particular those of philosopher and critic Tudor Vianu. In his recollections, first published in 1998, Călinescu wrote: "In 1957-1958, [...] I could see with my own eyes how the magazine's editor in chief, Paul Georgescu, was in the printing house, adding the political clichés and the daily slogans into the galley proofs of Tudor Vianu's weekly articles." Călinescu focuses on one such instance, when Georgescu was reportedly so angered by a Vianu text on Renaissance humanism (lacking the obligatory mention of Marxist humanism), that he called him "bourgeois pig" and modified the piece to contain "five or six ritualistic expressions in the wooden tongue". Constantin Țoiu also recalled that his own relationship with Georgescu cooled when the latter discovered that Țoiu was frequenting banned author Ion Negoițescu–this, Țoiu claimed, explains why he was no longer given permission to publish in Gazeta Literară. Georgescu took a personal part in condemning and marginalizing Negoiţescu (who was ultimately arrested in 1961), describing him as a "reactionary" author who had failed in adopting "the judicious attitude".

For comparison, Matei Călinescu also cites the case of academic Şerban Cioculescu, who was given conditional approval for publishing philological studies in Gazeta Literară, after a period during which the communist regime had denied him employment. The magazine was not allowed to host any of his articles in the periods before the state holidays, when any suspect or penitent author was unpublishable. Cioculescu had reportedly not realized the implications of this restriction, and, wanting to ensure continuity, contributed a festive piece on "socialist construction", sending it to the censor right before May Day. According to Călinescu, Georgescu "purely and simply exploded" when presented with the text. Writer Ștefan Agopian, who befriended Georgescu after that date, nevertheless notes that the critic made a point of specifying that he had saved Cioculescu's life by preventing his arrest over political grounds, and that he had been responsible for allowing him to publish again.

His role in the censorship process reportedly earned Georgescu personally the hostility of poet Ion Barbu, a modernist from Lovinescu's circle, whose political opinions and artistic tenets had made him virtually unpublishable. According to Valeriu Râpeanu, Barbu came up to the critic in Bucharest's Casa Capşa restaurant, and defiantly questioned the logic and effectiveness of censorship. Barbu's argument compared the regime with parents who fuss over the possibility of their child masturbating to the point where that child becomes determined to try it, and concluding: "That's what you communists are doing, by always telling poets not to imitate Ion Barbu, [and] 'don't follow up on Ion Barbu's poetry, be very careful because it's decadent poetry'. They will start to seek me out and read me."

=== Contradictory aspects ===
The degree to which Georgescu's involvement with Socialist Realism affected his work, beyond a surface level, is judged minor by several commentators. Matei Călinescu, Gabriel Dimisianu and Agopian reserve favorable words for his literary taste, contrasting it with the cultural environment of the 1950s (which they define as the source of mediocrity). Călinescu records how, during meetings with his friends at Casa Capşa and in other contexts, Paul Georgescu refused to talk official literature while openly discussing his admiration for foreign writers whose aesthetic choices or open rejection of Stalinism had made them unpublishable behind the Iron Curtain: André Gide, Arthur Koestler, André Malraux, Ignazio Silone and Paul Valéry. According to a late memoir by Eugen Campus, one of his subordinates at Gazeta Literară during the early 1950s, the editor was "prudent", keeping "underneath the dreary ashes of an apparent conformism, the lively embers of his ideals." Ţoiu sees Georgescu, Titus Popovici and Belu Zilber as advocating "the utopia of liberal socialism" during the 1950s, while Călinescu believes that his fellow critic "despised" Romanian communist leader Gheorghiu-Dej while respecting "the system which [Gheorghiu-Dej] had patronized", before the PCR refused De-Stalinization and accepted nationalism (implicitly marginalizing Georgescu's internationalism). Cosaşu also argues that Georgescu's own image as a "Stalinist" came from his refusal to equate Soviet and Nazi German totalitarianisms, and from his claim that Stalin "has saved all the capitalists" during and after World War II.

The distance Georgescu took from the official tenets reflected on his literary choices, a process which ended with his own marginalization. In the 1989 obituary, Nicolae Manolescu noted that Încercări critice "are not the most 'purblind' [writings] of their time", their author being "on the side of valuable literature, as much as there was of that, [and] against underachievements". Literary chronicler and translator Iulia Arsintescu thus believes that, for all problems they raise, Georgescu's earliest critical essays can still be considered "frequentable" (the category, Arsintescu believes, even stretches to include Georgescu's pronouncements on the controversial Socialist Realist Alexandru Toma).

Matei Călinescu places stress on the relationship between the enforcement of PCR directives at Gazeta Literară and Georgescu's promotion of modernism and young poetry. He notes how, in 1958, the editor published a "Zhdanovist" essay targeting directly Ion Barbu, which included negative comments on sampled poems, and how it was later revealed to him that this was a covert method to make Barbu's poetry somehow available to the general public. This, Călinescu writes, was a "cynical lesson" in how to use ideological texts as "a verbal package with a minimal content." In reference to Cioculescu and his potential arrest, Agopian cited Georgescu saying: "He had done nothing wrong, so he was still usable, we could not afford to lose a guy like Cioculescu just so we could have our prisons filled. Cioculescu's luck was that the idiots upstairs listened to me." The same commentator contends that, by not allowing his fellow critic to publish politicized texts, Georgescu may have intended to save his reputation. In addition, Călinescu cites Georgescu's reference to those writers who gave in to pressures and accepted to contribute propaganda as having paid their "entrance to the circus", as well as his belief that "keeping a private diary today [ca. 1957] is the equivalent of a denunciation." In Radu Cosaşu's account, although a "dogmatic Marxist", his older friend saw no link between the ideology and Socialist Realist guidelines, and never pressured him to write "for the party", while Dimisianu discusses Georgescu's "generosity" and "warmth" in respect to his friends and disciples.

The positive accounts, conservative critic Dan C. Mihăilescu notes, gravitate around the perception that Georgescu discreetly criticized Stalinism from the Left Opposition camp, and was a covert adherent to Trotskyism. Mihăilescu records several currents in interpreting Georgescu's relationship with the regime: "The generation colleagues and communist party comrades remember the writer's unshakable faith in the socio-political ideals of Trotskyism, in parallel with his non-extinguishable idiosyncrasy toward all things on the Right [...]. The literary generations of the '50-'80 years remember the opportunistic-cynical figure of the party kulturnik, the aficionado of literary backstairs, the artisan of cabals compromising the entire realm of old aristocrats, the 'dictator' at Viaţa Românească, the man always in Leonte Răutu's shadow". In Matei Călinescu's view, the Gazeta Literară editor, whom he calls "an evil and intolerant man, but with aspects of genuine generosity", was in essence "an intellectual Stalinist [...] and, on top of it, sentimentally a Troskyist." He believes Georgescu to have been "hyper-intelligent", but argues that his cognitive skills were being harnessed "by the most dogmatic and brutal form of stupidity." He also writes that episodes such as the promotion of Barbu's poetry through virulent criticism define "aberrant, downright schizophrenic forms [of behavior]."

=== The liberalization years ===
Progressively after Nicolae Ceauşescu's arrival to power, an event which signaled the start of relative liberalization together with the open encouragement of nationalism, Georgescu responded to the official policies. Dimisianu mentions Georgescu, together with Miron-Radu Parashivescu, Marin Preda, Zaharia Stancu, Baconsky, Dumitrescu, Jebeleanu, Bogza, and Cohmălniceanu, among those who actively helped his generation, as "writers and literary critics who had initially paid a toll to proletkultism, and [...] were silently parting with it, returning to literature, to actual criticism". At that stage, Bedros Horasangian argues, Georgescu "played along", transforming himself from a "not at all naïve or innocent critic and literary ideologue" into a person who acknowledged the change in perspective. According to Horasangian, Georgescu himself was "joking that 'Winter and summer are different things'—he probably always knew, just like Leonte Răutu, who, the more vigilant he was (or appeared), the more intensely he was reading 'rightist' French newspapers and magazines". During a 2004 interview, reflecting on the value of literature produced under communism, literary historian Alex. Ştefănescu recalled: "Paul Georgescu had a saying he used when I was asking him with half-irony: 'Mr. Paul, how was it possible that you wrote so badly in the years of dogmatism?'. 'Forget that, dear—he would say—the problem is that I couldn't tell I was writing badly'."

Former protégé Agopian assessed that, as late as the 1980s, Paul Georgescu had "the aura of an inffalible critic." The new parameters of his criticism became evident in the late 1960s and early 1970s. Before the April Theses put an end to liberalization, Georgescu joined a new wave of anthologists and commentators openly engaged in the recovery of modernism, or calling for artistic innovation (among them were Alexandru Ivasiuc, Adrian Marino, Sașa Pană and Eugen Simion). He was also revisiting the legacy of Junimea, contributing the preface to a 1967 complete edition of Maiorescu's essays. The piece focused on Maiorescu's expansion of the "art for art's sake" principle, his belief that truth and beauty were opposed to each other, and his move from the rejection of literary patriotism to the praise of Romanian folklore as an aesthetic model. Georgescu's colleague Zigu Ornea called the study "excellent", commenting that it "has restored many truths about the great critic [Maiorescu]'s work."

In a letter to Ion Simuț, Georgescu defined himself as "an analyst", and his books as "psycho-social analyses". Using the Marxist terminology of dialectical materialism, he argued: "Destiny is the dialectical tension between temperament and the socio-historical structure." Basing himself on an interpretation of French philosopher Jean-Paul Sartre, he also expressed his belief in "literary relativism". In Georgescu's own metaphorical definition, which he claimed to have outlined for the benefit of his fellow critic Manolescu, good criticism is characterized by how "structural obsessions" and "affixed ideas" that helped it avoid being "washed out into the Black Sea". He also saw a psychological benefit to writing: "[It] defends us internally, provides us with internal force. Wise guys manage things easily, but let's not envy them: they shall never know the great joys we experience through work. They are all poor human beings."

Georgescu's political options remained with the far left, and explicitly with Trotskyism. This process, Cosașu writes, made Georgescu "a multi-faceted Leninist" with a secret sympathy for anarchism, who "had fought to bring into power a system which he justified, while despising virtually all of its officials". According to literary critic Paul Cernat, "[his] break with dogmatism manifested itself only on a strictly aesthetic level", while Agopian stated: "Paul Georgescu used to work for the PCR's C[entral] C[ommittee], where he was a martinet. He was, however, a man so extraordinary, that it was impossible to make an accusation of his militant Marxism. He was a Marxist, but he was not a Ceauşist." Also according to Agopian: "The ferocious Marxist that he was always supplanted by the mocking essayist born in the south of the country". Cernat, who compares Georgescu with his generation colleague, the fantasy and experimental author Mircea Horia Simionescu, also notes that their main difference between them was the political choices as reflected in their individual works: while Georgescu continued to ridicule "bourgeois conventions", the anti-communist Simionescu, whose "incompatibility with the Party's ideology was irremediably total [...] forgave nothing."

Having been introduced to Georgescu during the final stage of the critic's career, Manea retold one of his confessions from the time: "I suppose what you heard about me is that I am a Stalinist. I'm not a Stalinist, Mr. Norman, know that. I was with Leiba Trotsky." Manea also wrote: "What struck about [him] was the contradiction between the extraordinary mobility of spirit and the Affixed Idea. [...] How did he pacify his disappointments and regenerate his militantism after having seen with his eyes, and his mind, and his heart the nightmarish masquerade of the totalitarian state?" He added: "The socialist tension between the 'conserved' ideal and the putrid reality maintained in those who gave up neither contempt nor complicity a sort of narcissistic and megalomaniac blindness."

=== Ceaușescu-era disputes ===
According to literary historian Mircea Martin, Georgescu was one of the intellectuals who, after the liberalization episode, were involved in the large debates over the interpretation of history and the nature of Romanian culture. In this interpretation, he stood among those who protected the ideals of Europeanism and cosmopolitanism, in the company of other communists dissatisfied with the official line (Crohmălniceanu, Savin Bratu, Vera Călin, Paul Cornea, Silvian Iosifescu), of former political prisoners of communism (Nicolae Balotă, Ovidiu Cotruș, Ștefan Augustin Doinaș, Adrian Marino, Ion Negoițescu, Alexandru Paleologu), and of many younger figures who were just making their debut on the literary scene. This community, Martin notes, resisted the ethnic nationalism and protochronism promoted with acquiescence from the regime, by such figures as Paul Anghel, Eugen Barbu, Edgar Papu, Mihai Ungheanu and Dan Zamfirescu. Paul Georgescu's contemporaries describe his enduring passion for ideological conflict. He believed Romanian literature itself to have been shaped by the conflict between two stances, both exemplified by 19th century authors: on one hand, the pessimistic and emphatic Mihai Eminescu; on the other, the sarcastic and often absurdist Ion Luca Caragiale.

Such confrontational stances were reportedly reflected in his regular activities: according to Cosașu, Georgescu reacted to the power regained by the Securitate secret police under Ceaușescu, and ridiculed its tactics by circulating political jokes and gossip. He reportedly made no secret of his antipathy for Ceauşescu himself. In parallel, he believed Romania had to choose between the Iron Guard's return as national communism and a consecrated form of Marxism-Leninism. During the mid-1960s, Norman Manea writes, the emerging nationalist press attacked Georgescu as a "dogmatic", being joined in this effort by some "who had asserted themselves, like Georgescu, through more than a few compromises and collaborations". Also according to Manea, Georgescu's fear that Ceauşescu would endorse neofascist terror resulted in a mental breakdown, for which he had to be hospitalized in the late 1960s. The writer also records how Georgescu had ceased his collaboration with Scînteia over this type of ideological differences, and how he showed contempt the radical nationalist discourse promoted by Eugen Barbu's Luceafărul and Săptămîna or by Adrian Păunescu's Flacăra. Georgescu had an increasingly hostile relationship with Marin Preda, whom he allegedly suspected of having joined the nationalist circles after publishing the novels Delirul (1975) and Cel mai iubit dintre pământeni (1980). Manea cites Georgescu's portrayals of Preda as a promiscuous alcoholic, as well as his publicized and purposefully ambiguous definition of the younger author as a "national writer", but also recounts that the critic was moved to tears by Preda's 1980 death.

In parallel, his encouragement of conflict intertwined with his definitions of ethics in relation to communist justice. In his dialogue with Florin Mugur, Georgescu dismissively qualified idealism and altruism as "vegetarianism". Călinescu notes that, although himself dissatisfied with life under Ceauşescu, Georgescu was "angered" by news that his former employee had defected and settled in the United States, and had come to see Călinescu's action as determined by his distant kinship with nationalist philosopher Mircea Vulcănescu. A similar story is told by Norman Manea, whom the regime pressured to leave Romania, which he eventually did in 1986. Cosaşu, who had by then grown disillusioned with communism, recalls having engaged his friend about the need to repent, a point Georgescu received with amusement, and, as a stated atheist, sarcastically compared with belief in the Last Judgment. For Manea, the critic's refusal to make a complete break with communism was explained by a number of factors. According to the novelist, Georgescu was by then well-informed of the Gulag and other crimes of communism, as well as of comparisons they raised with the Holocaust, but may have expected a moment when the ideology would harness "his qualities, not just his flaws, in service of the much-imagined goal." Being frustrated in this expectation, Manea proposes, the former activist may have actually been radicalized further under Ceauşescu's rule, once confronted with the "morass which suffocated growing sections of the population, the misery, the fear, the demagogy." A survivor of the Holocaust in Romania, the young novelist recorded how his allusive comparisons between crimes of the Ion Antonescu regime and those of communism irritated Georgescu, who once told him: "Given your biography, you should be with us."

As a reflection of his participation in disputes, Georgescu became notorious for his sarcastic puns and the monikers he assigned to his friends and enemies alike. According to Dimisianu: "Granted, he was foul-mouthed, spiteful, always lashing out with his words, the creator of amusing nicknames that were quickly circulated in the literary milieus, and being that way also made him enemies, and even made some regard him as a malevolent, corrosive spirit. He was not." He reportedly braved the authorities by branding the Ceauşescu regime a revival of the Iron Guard, and habitually referred to the PCR leader as Căpitanul ("The Captain", a title associated with the Iron Guard leader Corneliu Zelea Codreanu), while his moniker for Scînteia editor Nicolae Dragoş was Răcănel ("Tree Frog", but also "Little Soldier"). He also casually referred to Alain Robbe-Grillet, the French Nouveau Roman author, as Rochie-Friptă ("Toasted Gown"), in turn a word-by-word translation of the humorous homonym robe grillé. Other nicknames were structured around obscenities, and included his reference to an unnamed colleague as Linge Cur ("Ass-licker"). He integrated such names in his regular speech, creating a secret system of references that his closest friends were required to learn.

Paul Georgescu's receptive chronicles and critical pronouncements on literature, often written from a maverick perspective, have themselves raised questions. In a 2008 interview, Norman Manea himself stated having been "shocked" to learn that Georgescu considered him a successor to interwar novelist Camil Petrescu and Ion Luca Caragiale, and noted that he had never before taken this into consideration. Radu Petrescu reported being surprised by Georgescu's belief to have discerned far-reaching references to the political and cultural context in his novel Matei Iliescu. Arguing that, for all his intent of escaping daily pressures through literature, "a real flight is never truly possible", Petrescu concluded: "After all, it could be like [Georgescu said]."

== Fiction writings ==
=== Style ===
Georgescu's work as a novelist, largely independent from his political affiliations, endures as his most praised contribution. Norman Manea defines his older colleague as "an important and unmistakable writer, [who] endures, like all important and unmistakable writers, regardless of their obsessions and political options." He adds: "[Georgescu was] a hero of the book, not of the Revolution."

A main characteristic of Paul Georgescu's fiction is its evolution at the margin of parody, which many times implies a humorous subtext. According to Arsintescu, this attitude unites Georgescu the critic with Georgescu the storyteller: "The link [is] the spirit, the charm of a razor-sharp intelligence, the gigantic guffaw (fond? sarcastic?) behind which he gazes upon the world." In contrast to his ideological tenets, Georgescu the fiction author is perceived by many as a postmodernist, whose reinterpretation of traditional themes reaches the stage of meta-literature and intertextuality. Thus, he is believed by Ştefan Agopian to have been Romania's "first postmodernist", whose contributions came before the Optzecişti writers were themselves grouped under the "postmodern" label. Radu Cosaşu notes that, although he considered himself one of the neorealists, Georgescu rejected works by the realist greats (from Honoré de Balzac and Émile Zola to Fyodor Dostoyevsky). The writer himself spoke of "modern prose" as determined by a goal "to rehabilitate regular life, composed from a number of actions, not just one, in which suspense and explosive dénouement exist only rarely, or where several non-coincident interferences coexist." Reportedly, he defined literature itself as a "trance of nuances".

According to Manea, Georgescu's literary universe took on a definitive form only in the late 1960s or early 1970s. Georgescu's narratives of the period drew their themes from, and often consciously imitated, a diversity of literary sources. Commentators emphasize that Ion Luca Caragiale, a main figure in 19th century Romanian humor, was an important inspiration for several of his works. He is also commonly believed to have been stimulated by the novels of George Călinescu. Other Romanian authors who influenced Georgescu, or whose style was pastiched by Georgescu, include Camil Petrescu and Ion Luca's son Mateiu Caragiale, alongside Duiliu Zamfirescu, Alexandru Odobescu and Mihai Eminescu. In parallel, Radu Petrescu believed his fellow novelist to have been "all to evident[ly]" inspired by the interwar novelist Anton Holban, particularly in his Vîrsele tinereţii.

Particularly during the 1960s, Georgescu blended these sources with influences from the trends of 20th century French literature: the Nouveau Roman of Alain Robbe-Grillet and Jean-Paul Sartre's Marxist existentialism. He was at the time taking his examples from "engaged authors" such as Sartre and André Malraux, resenting the independent road taken by Albert Camus. Among the other international authors, Georgescu preferred John Dos Passos, Franz Kafka, Marcel Proust, and James Joyce. Cosaşu recalls that his older colleague would seek inspiration directly in the pages of Joyce's Ulysses.

In Georgescu's novels, the strictly fictional was often found side by side with concrete autobiographical elements. The recipe was noted by critic Lucian Raicu: "the bookish as much as the intimately lived experience [Raicu's italics]". Raicu adds: "The sense of abundant, diverse, life, of a fascinating materiality, endlessly harasses the habits of the bookish man, who lives among models and masterpieces as if in his element, and eventually fuses with them". Georgescu's works, alongside those of Norman Manea, were also case studies for literary historian Liviu Petrescu, who documented the extent of self-referential and intransitive prose in Romanian postmodernism. Manea cites Ion Simuţ in discussing the main topic of Georgescu's narratives: "A dynamic rationale facing a world lacking in dynamism, [and] almost inert."

=== From the early stories to Vara baroc ===
Georgescu progressively earned recognition as an author just as he was largely withdrawn from public life. The 1973 short story Pilaf, a part-memoir piece with philosophical undertones, is rated by Bedros Horasangian "an exceptional prose piece, perhaps the best to have been written by Paul Georgescu". Horasangian commends its "exceptional stylistic refinement", and notes that the eponymous dish is to Georgescu what the madeleine is to Proust (see In Search of Lost Time). Dan C. Mihăilescu, who recalls the novella was "famous", also judges it to be one of the "peaks" in Georgescu's writing career, while Arsintescu deems the piece "sensational", and the 3 nuvele volume itself "excellent". The recollection aspect in Georgescu's prose was also present in other writings of the period, including Doctorul Poenaru, whose eponymous protagonist is his own father.

Set in the interwar period, Revelion introduces the character Gabriel Dimancea, a schoolteacher, journalist, aspiring novelist and World War I veteran who is absorbed by the fate of his fellow human beings. Dimancea is also the protagonist of Vara baroc, a volume identified by Dan C. Mihăilescu as the second "peak" among Georgescu's contributions. In this narrative, the protagonist's dreams of social revolution contrast with the immovability and apathy induced by the intense summer heat of Platoneşti, a fictional town in the Bărăgan Plain. According to Ion Simuţ, the volume ranks with other "epic episodes set against the Dog Days", in novels by "Wallachian" southerners: Agopian, Ştefan Bănulescu, Fănuş Neagu, Marin Preda, Nicolae Velea. Simuţ likens the narrative to Ivan Goncharov's classic work, Oblomov, noting in particular Dimancea's refusal to engage in productive activities, his wantonness, and belief that sexual intercourse is too tiresome; however: "Gabriel Dimancea does not, after all, evolve in the sense of Goncharov's character, because he fights against himself. He becomes the intellectual of frustrated revolt, enduring only as a project—a revolt frustrated by the adverse meteorology. One could say—exaggerating a little, for the sake of paraphrase—that his revolution (interior and social) is postponed by the torpor." This process is reflected in Dimancea's conversations with estate leaseholder Maltezi, whose steady questioning of the schoolteacher's revolutionary ideas and repeated distractions contribute to Dimancea's growing acceptance of inactivity, failure and moral dissolution. Against the summer-enhanced steadiness of regular life in the Kingdom of Romania, the novel sets the rising threat of fascism, depicting in particular Dimancea's growing fear toward the political agitator Corneliu Zelea Codreanu and his embryonic Iron Guard. Simuţ believes the events in the novel may refer to 1926, the "political parenthesis" between National Liberal regimes, when the People's Party of Alexandru Averescu confronts the National Peasantist opposition.

The narrative language of Vara baroc has also drawn the critical interest. Citing the book as a prime example, Dan C. Mihăilescu called its author "a monster of brilliant loquacity". Commenting on the use of word plays and the accumulation of metaphors, Simuţ argues: "[these] are put to use into a signification which goes beyond simple gratuitousness; language is to Gabriel Dimancea a windscreen that emerges suddenly, like a wall, in front of those who seek pathways toward understanding him and uncovering his secret." The dense nature of the account, Simuţ believes, doubles as a pace-maintaining technique, to make up for the steadiness of the plot, to entertain by means of a "comedy of language", to illustrate the breakdown of intelligent behavior, and to blur the lines between real and imagined. He notes: "Loquacity is the illusion of action and engagement [...]. The real and the fantastical short-circuit one another."

=== Final works ===
Georgescu was especially prolific in the final part of his career, when he reputedly identified with the slogan anul şi romanul ("a new novel every year"). According to Iulia Arsintescu, their quality declined as their author became "plagued by an illness that was harder and harder to bear." Beginning with Mai mult ca perfectul, Georgescu was creating a new cycle, with a focus on Huzurei. The narrator Miron Perieţeanu, himself a fictional version of Georgescu, tells the successive stories of Ioan, Luca, Matei and Marcu (names based on the Romanian versions for the Four Evangelists). The events in these novels also take place during the early 20th century, covering the 1907 peasants' revolt as well as the World War I occupation of the country. According to literary chronicler Ioan Holban, the Huzurei setting is "a desolate place, stupefied by the torpor, with squeamish people always sweaty from the heat, moving idly from one tavern to another [...] and devoting themselves to that almighty goddess that is the siesta [...]. This is only a first impression, for Huzurei is 'the living citadel' of its time [...], grouping, in between its ridiculous houses and streets, a diverse world, caught in the midst of a struggle over power and money: [here] crimes are being committed, intrigues, drug traffic networks and 'wholesale' exchanges are being set up, politics are hotly debated, predictions are being made, investigations, chases take place, dramas are being consumed, people eat vigorously, and nubile girls are being sold (bought) [...]." The Huzurei narratives as a whole are thought by Cosaşu equal in value to some of their acclaimed predecessors: George Călinescu's Bietul Ioanide and Marin Preda's Moromeţii.

With Solstiţiu tulburat, Georgescu was building on old novelistic themes, borrowing his characters directly from works by Duiliu Zamfirescu and George Călinescu. In Arsintescu's view, these echoes are blended to create "an entirely new and utterly modern novel." According to Nicolae Manolescu, it may be the only such work in Romanian literature (Manolescu also wonders if there are any such writings in other national segments of modern literature). Paul Cernat notes that the fiction also blends the real and the imagined, being, together with Horasangian's Sala de aşteptare ("Waiting Room", 1987), compatible with the historical fiction techniques used by American author E. L. Doctorow in his Ragtime.

== Legacy ==
=== Influence and posthumous disputes ===
As author of fiction, Paul Georgescu had a small but dedicated following. Iulia Arsintescu recounts that, like her, a select few readers from Romania and other Eastern Bloc countries had discovered Georgescu's under-appreciated novels by accident, and had soon after become his devotees. Among Georgescu's early admirers, Horasangian lists himself and author Florin Mugur, noting that the latter, a "very careful reader", used to underline selected passages in Georgescu's work, where he believed a deeper meaning was detectable. From the authors to have come into contact with Paul Georgescu, Ion Simuţ continued to consider himself the critic's disciple after his mentor died. A high school in Țăndărei was posthumously renamed in Paul Georgescu's honor.

Georgescu's legacy and influence as an essayist and author of fiction remained marginal in Romania's post-communist transition, a fact which caused several critics to react negatively. Hostility toward him was reportedly widespread in the literary community at the time of his death, which, in his 1989 obituary for the author, Nicolae Manolescu equated with ingratitude: "the 'trifles' of daily life [which Georgescu provided to his peers] have become essential in the biographies of aspiring writers." Manea also wrote: "plenty among Paul's former friends and admirers have enclosed themselves into an opaque conjectural silence, others have rushed in to 'cleanse' themselves of the unseasonable connection." Literary critic Daniel Cristea-Enache defines Georgescu as "a critic and a prose writer who should not be omitted by any serious work of literary history", while his colleague Cernat refers to Georgescu as "unfairly forgotten". Horasangian believes him to have been "completely forgotten", "ignored", and "taken out of the circuit." Cristea-Enache adds that, with time, "our, how should I put it?, indecent indifference [has been] shadowing the name and bibliography of an important writer who is no longer among us". The Georgescu-Simuţ correspondence was published in 2000 as Învăţăturile unui venerabil prozator bucureştean către un tânăr critic din provincie ("The Teachings of a Venerable Prose Writer from Bucharest to a Young Provincial Critic"). In his review of that year, Cristea-Enache called it "one of the most beautiful, most energizing and at the same time most impressive books I have read lately." Dimisianu sees in them proof of "how very human this 'devil' could prove himself to be, how full of warmth, how much troubled by his friend's troubles". Reflecting on Georgescu's fiction, Ioan Holban notes that, during Romania's transitional stage, Țăndărei came to resemble Huzurei more and more, especially after it became the center of a human trafficking and illegal immigration scandal pitting United Kingdom authorities against members of the local Romani community.

Controversies surrounding Georgescu and his fellow communist literary figures resurfaced in late 2008, when Nicolae Manolescu published the synthesis Istoria critică a literaturii române ("The Critical History of Romanian Literature"). On the other side, the debate involved Dan C. Mihăilescu, who had earlier criticized other intellectuals for upholding a positive image of Georgescu the novelist while "neglect[ing] the other bio-bibliographic compartments of a cultural and political doctrinaire", defining it as "an error." Reviewing Manolescu's book for Idei în Dialog magazine, he reproached the author being too lenient on authors whose public image was affected by their association with the communist regime or the communist ideology, and of being too dismissive of Constantin Noica, a far right thinker of the interwar period whom national communists had come to respect. Mihăilescu asked: "Does one wish to turn into alleviating circumstance for the likes of Petru Dumitriu, Crohmălniceanu, Maria Banuş, Paul Georgescu, Nina Cassian, Gellu Naum or Edgar Papu all that becomes an aggravating circumstance with Noica?" He agreed that Manolescu had a liberty of interpretation, based on his "rationalist, enlightened, playful structure, clearly hostile to nationalist metaphysics", but argued that his pronouncements on Noica were unfair. To Manolescu's claim that "no Romanian intellectual from the communist years was more conflicting than Noica", Dan C. Mihăilescu replied with counterexamples of communist supporters (Georgescu, Crohmălniceanu, Tudor Arghezi, George Călinescu, Geo Dumitrescu and Mihail Sadoveanu).

=== In fiction ===
Georgescu's impact on literary life was also reflected by his portrayals in fiction. According to Manea, Marin Preda modeled more than one of his characters on Paul Georgescu. In Istoria critică a literaturii române, Nicolae Manolescu identifies characters based on Georgescu in two contemporary novels. One of these fictional figures is Ion Mincu, a minor presence in Preda's Cel mai iubit dintre pământeni; the other is Mr. Leo, the protagonist of Constantin Ţoiu's Căderea în lume ("Falling into the World", 1987), a physically disabled communist who plays host to the lionized literary society of Bucharest during a New Year's Eve celebration.

In what Manolescu describes as an "exceptional" part of the latter book, Ţoiu turns the party into political confrontation, opposing Leo to the younger Babis Vătăşescu, who has just discovered his family's past involvement with the fascist Iron Guard. Also according to Manolescu, the book evades the official "stencil" of Socialist Realist writers such as Petru Dumitriu, and the censorship of the times, by depicting Vătăşescu's fascist uncle as having "immense intellectual radiance and fundamental moral honesty", while Mr. Leo himself is not "the hero without fear and beyond reproach". Manolescu concludes: "in the ideological duel, there is neither winner nor loser. The novelist's objective perspective is absolutely amazing if we are to consider the late 1980s, when Căderea saw print." Critic and essayist Ioana Macrea-Toma also notes Georgescu's depiction in Ţoiu's novel, believing it to constitute the author's "retaliation", and noting that both Georgescu and Eugen Barbu had reserves about seeing the volume published.

Under anagramed names, Georgescu, Cosaşu, Dumitriu, and fellow writers Eugen Barbu, Lucia Demetrius, Victor Eftimiu, Nicolae Labiş and Zaharia Stancu are characters in Tinereţea unui comisar politic ("The Youth of a Political Commissar"), a novel by the Romanian-born French author Miron Bergmann. A former Gazeta Literară staff member, Bergmann had defected in 1964.
