= Viața ca o pradă =

1977 novel by Marin Preda

Life as prey
- First edition
- Author: Marin Preda
- Original title: Viaţa ca o pradă
- Language: Romanian
- Genre: Novel
- Publisher: Editura Albatros
- Publication date: 1977
- Publication place: Romania
- Media type: Print (Hardback & Paperback)
- ISBN: 973-591-122-1

Viaţa ca o pradă (Life as prey) is a 1977 partly-autobiographical novel by Romanian author Marin Preda.

== Plot summary ==
The novel describes the childhood and adolescence of Marin, the narrator, especially his times at school. Marin finishes near the top at the primary school in his native village. He then tries to enroll at a school in Câmpulung, but is rejected because of an eye problem. He goes with his father to Miroși, where he meets a dishonest librarian who demands 1,000 lei to enroll him in a school, but recommends an unsuitable school. Instead, the teenager is enrolled in a school in Blaj, where he studies for two years. Because of the war, he is transferred from there to a school in Bucharest. Marin's father refuses to pay his school fees there, but he manages to get admitted. He only remains at the school for a year, however, as it is demolished by an earthquake. Marin remains in Bucharest where his brother Nila works as a guard in a building. There is no money for him to go to school, so he looks for a job to earn money to pay for exams at a private school. He finds a job with the railroad, but it does not last long. When he comes back he learns that his brother has joined the army and let his room to him. Marin takes a job with a newspaper and then with a printer, eventually earning enough to rent a better room. With a group of friends he wants to publish his first book of short stories and then take several months' vacation in Sinaia, where he hopes to write a novel. He has no inspiration, but after becoming editor of Viața Românească, he takes a long vacation and returns to Sinaia, where he writes Moromeții.
