= Siliștea Gumești =

- Commune
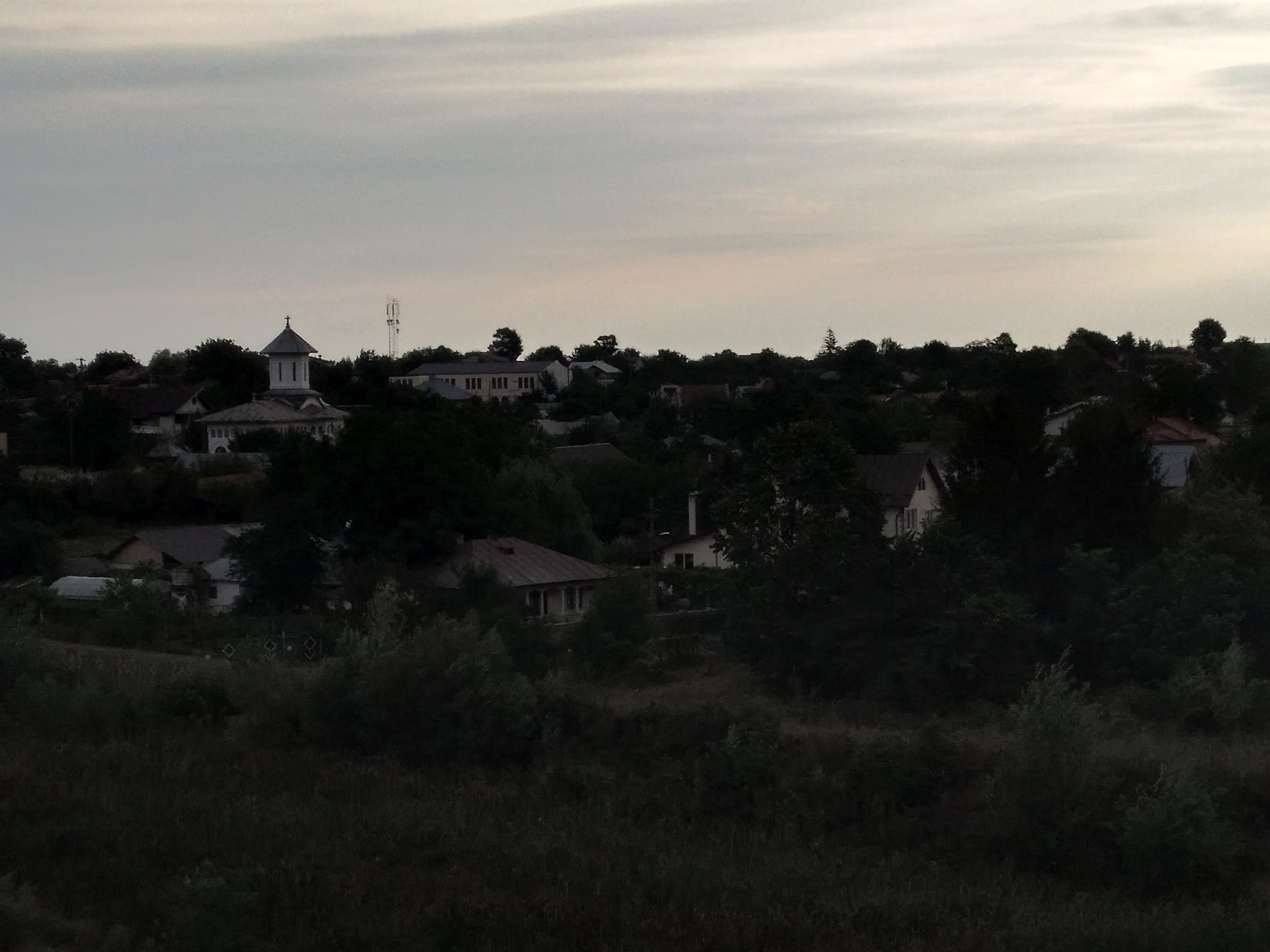

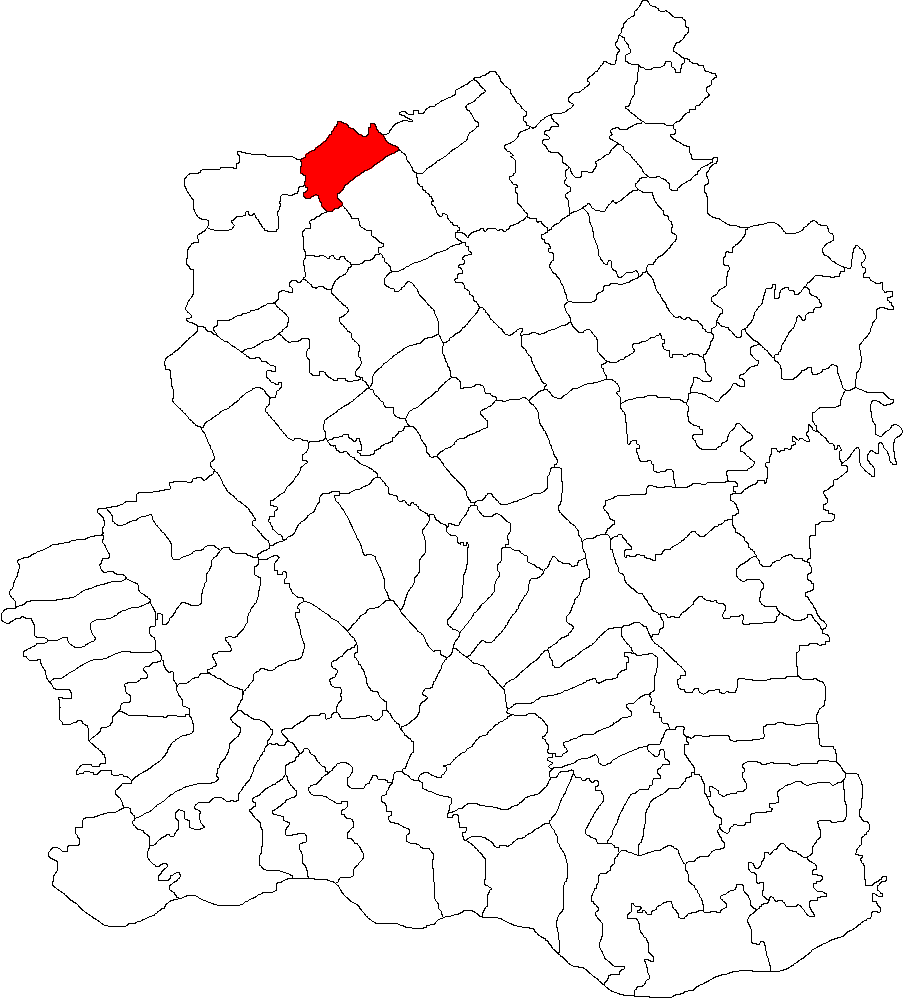
- Location in Teleorman County

- Location in Romania
- Coordinates: 44°23′N 25°00′E
- Country: Romania
- County: Teleorman

Government
  - Mayor (2024–2028): Anișoara Dicu (AUR)
- Area: 44.58 km^{2} (17.21 sq mi)
- Elevation: 142 m (466 ft)
- Population (2021-12-01): 2,200
  - Density: 49/km^{2} (130/sq mi)
- Time zone: UTC+02:00 (EET)
  - Summer (DST): UTC+03:00 (EEST)
- Postal code: 147350
- Area code: +(40) 247
- Vehicle reg.: TR
- Website: primariasilisteagumesti.ro

Siliștea Gumești is a commune in Teleorman County, Muntenia, Romania. It is composed of a single village, Siliștea Gumești. It was known as Siliștea Nouă from 1968 to 1996.

Near Siliștea Gumești there is an abandoned air base; built in 1945–1947, the military facility operated MiG-15s.

Famous residents include the writer Marin Preda (1922–1980), considered the most important novelist in the post-World War II Romanian literature. The action of his novel, Moromeții, takes place at Siliștea Gumești.
