= Obsessive decade =

The Obsessive decade (Romanian: obsedantul deceniu) was a term originally coined by writer Marin Preda to refer to disdain shown by literary critics following the de-Stalinization of the 1960s towards the socialist realist Romanian literary works of the 1950s era. It has since become a common reference to the latter or to the Romanian experience of the 1950s as a whole, as criticism of the period was encouraged by Nicolae Ceaușescu's "national communism" and afterwards officially endorsed following the fall of the regime in 1989.

== Novels ==
Principele ("The Prince", 1969) by Eugen Barbu is an allegory referring to the Gheorghe Gheorghiu-Dej regime. The novel is set in the Phanariote era, describing a prince trying to build a canal (referring to the Danube–Black Sea Canal) without any consideration for his subjects, many of whom die during its construction.

F (1969) by Dumitru Radu Popescu tried to divide the guilt for the abuses of the Stalinist era; the book is focused on a judicial enquiry on the collectivization of peasant holdings, trying to equate the reluctance to talk about the crimes with complicity.

Two novels, Paul Goma's Ostinato (1971) and Alexandru Ivasiuc's Păsările ("The Birds", 1973) discussed the Bucharest student movement of 1956, during which both authors were arrested. While Ivasiuc made some concessions to meet the censors' approval, Goma lost patience and published it in West Germany.

== See also ==
- Cel mai iubit dintre pământeni
