= Edgar Papu =

Romanian scholar of literature (1908-1993)

Edgar Papu or Edgard I. Pappu (13/26 September 1908 in Bucharest – 30 March 1993) was a Romanian scholar of literature and a professor. He is notable for coining the term protochronism (Romanian: protochronismul) in 1974, and for assisting development of this nationalist-literary-historical concept during the Ceaușescu regime.
