= Florin Mugur =

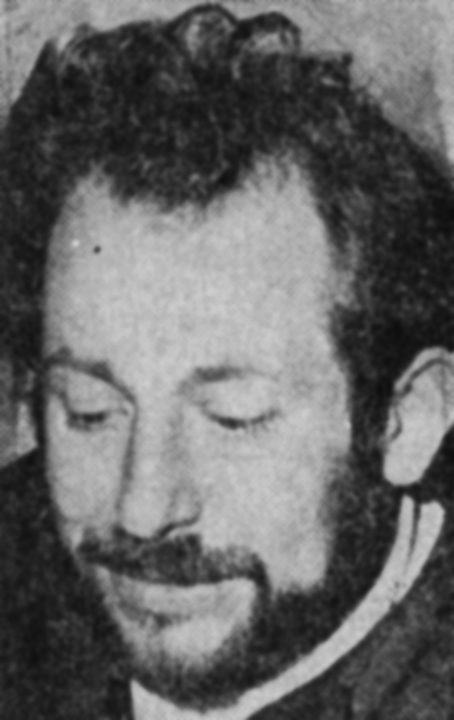
Mugur in 1987

Florin Mugur (Romanian pronunciation: [floˈrin ˈmuɡur]), born as Legrel Mugur on 7 February 1934 in Bucharest, Romania, was a Romanian-Jewish poet, essayist, editor, and prose writer.

Mugur had his literary debut at the age of 13 and published his first book at the age of 19. He was one of the editors of the Cartea Românească publishing house and deputy editor-in-chief of Argeș magazine. Additionally, he was a close friend of Norman Manea.

Feeling lonely after his beloved wife Iulia's premature death and battling illness, he committed suicide on 9 February 1991.

== Works ==
- "Visele de dimineață" (The Morning Dreams),
- "Mituri" (Myths)
- "Piatra palidă" (The Pale Stone)- for which he received the Romanian Writers' Union Prize)
- "Aproape noiembrie" (Almost November)
- "Convorbiri cu Marin Preda" (Talking With Marin Preda)
- "Profesiunea de scriitor" (Being a Writer)
- "Ultima vară a lui Antim" (Antim's Last Summer)
- "Scrisori la capătul zilelor" (Letters at The End of The Days)
- "Vârstele raţiunii" (The Ages of Ration)
- "Dansul cu cartea" (The Dance With The Book)
- "Viaţa obligatorie" (The Obligatory Life)
- "Portretul unui necunoscut" (The Portrait of a Stranger)
- "Firea lucrurilor" (The Way Things Are)
- "Schiţe despre fericire" (Short Stories About Happiness)
