= Moromeții =

Romanian novel

The Moromete Family
- Author: Marin Preda
- Original title: Moromeţii
- Language: Romanian
- Genre: Novel
- Publication date: 1955 & 1967
- Publication place: Romania
- Media type: Print (hardback & paperback)

Moromeţii (Romanian pronunciation: [moroˈmet͡sij], "The Moromete Family") is a novel by the Romanian author Marin Preda, one which consecrated him as the most important novelist in the post-World War II Romanian literature.

In about a thousand pages, grouped in two parts, redrawing, over about twenty years, the slow and deep dissolution of an ordinary peasant family living in the village of Siliştea-Gumeşti (Teleorman), in the Wallachian Plain, Preda aimed to fulfil his credo ("without notions like history, truth, reality, prose would make no sense").

== Plot summary ==
=== Moromeţii - volume 1 (1955) ===
Moromeţii I is the first novel in the series, written at the time when Preda was known to the public and critics for his short stories.

Ilie Moromete, his wife Catrina, their children Ilinca, Tita and Niculae, and Ilie's older sons from a previous marriage, Paraschiv, Nilă and Achim, seem to live, although not excepted from difficulties, a regular life. Their story, covering a couple of years in the late 1930s, is in some way the negation of the opening phrase of the novel: "In the Danube fields, a few years before World War II, it seemed that time was very patient with people; life was going on here without major conflicts".

Starting several pages later, time itself seems to have accelerated, with the rhythm of peasant life replacing that of nature. The Morometes, like many other peasant families who received small plots of land in the reform, have to pay land taxes - which accumulate with each passing year. The debt, worsened by the low crop prices following the Great Depression in Romania is only the starting point of Ilie's turmoil: he, a respected figure in the village community, has to face not only the shame of fighting the tax collector but, in what is the actual drama, the incomprehension of his family. Indeed, the three older sons do not stand their stepmother and her children, and want their father to sell a particular plot of land and split the sum with them - the brothers are also planning to start new lives in the capital Bucharest. Braving Ilie's refusal, they run away from home with the family horses, stealing their stepsisters' dowry. Moromete ends up selling a part of the land, paying back the tax debt, and ceding to his wife's request to pay tuition for their youngest boy Niculae.

=== Moromeţii - volume 2 (1967) ===
Published twelve years later (the author wrote two more novels in the meanwhile) and surprising censorship and socialist-obedient literary critics, the second volume is mainly a distinct novel from the first one : except for the action place, the village of Siliştea-Gumeşti in Teleorman, the structure, the narrative technique and the style itself are different from Moromeţii I.

Moromeţii II focuses on a collective character - the village. Following World War II, a new, communist-regime world is being constructed, with its specific social ties and concerns. The moral conflict that constituted the theme of the first volume evolves into a social one, the land collective property, englobing the first. During forced collectivisation, a process that dramatically changed rural landscape, an aged Ilie Moromete, abandoned by his sons and his wife, left by his old friends, no longer seems to be able to fit.

Relevant pages describing Moromete make points against the "new society" credo of his youngest son Niculae, by now a young man sent to his own village by the Romanian Communist Party to carry out propaganda in favour of new collective farms. Denying merit to communism and its goal to eliminate private land ownership and transform peasants into farm workers, Moromete dies proud of "having lived like an independent man".

== Major themes ==
If previous Romanian novels with similar themes (those of Ioan Slavici and Liviu Rebreanu) were centred on dramas involving acquiring plots, Moromeţii shifted focus on preserving ownership of the land. The example of Ilie Moromete, who sees his peasant mentalities and way of life (reliance on land ownership and family), traces the destiny of his social category between not long after the land reform to what has later been deemed "the obsessive decade" of the 1950s; Moromete and his peasant dignity are crushed by deep changes brought about by capitalism, industrialization, and finally communism.

A minute and complex picture of the Romanian countryside life during the period, Moromeţii distinguished itself by the characters' depth and inner strength—especially those of the main hero, a contemplative archetype of "man-living-of-land-labour". Preda heavily relies on the use of his characters' use of language (comprising their particular humour, reflexion, and subtle meditation on deep questions of existence). According to Alexandru Piru: "With Moromeţii Preda gives the proof that peasant world is not, as we were used to believe, governed by instincts, but is capable of great feelings, and that its soul reactions are infinite".

== Film adaptations ==
The Moromete Family, directed by Stere Gulea with Victor Rebengiuc as Ilie Moromete, was released in 1987. It is based on the first volume. A sequel The Moromete Family 2 was filmed in 2017 and released in 2018.
