= Marin Preda =

Romanian writer (1922–1980)

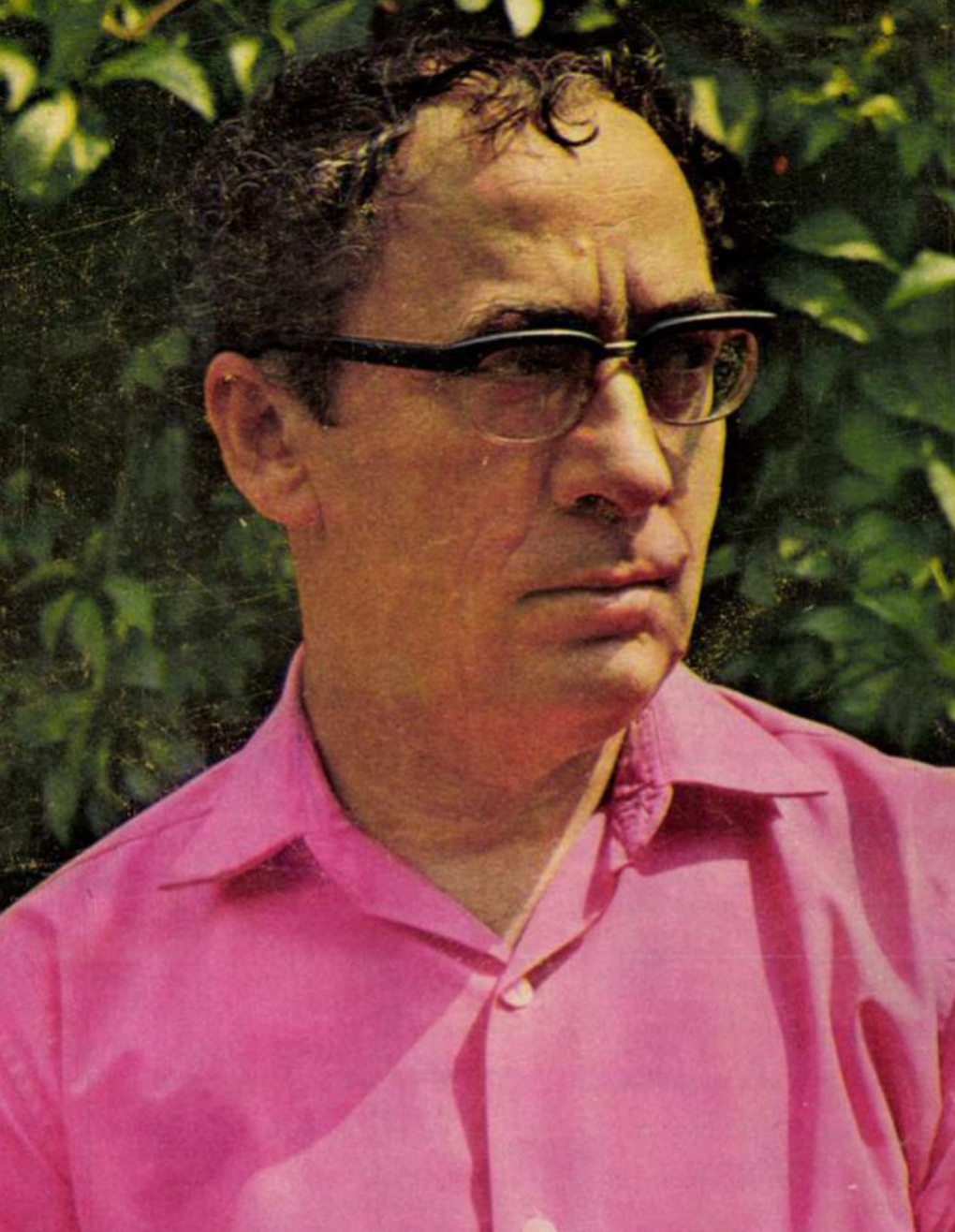
- Preda in 1975
- Born: 5 August 1922; Siliștea Gumești, Kingdom of Romania
- Died: 16 May 1980 (aged 57); Mogoșoaia, Socialist Republic of Romania
- Resting place: Bellu Cemetery, Bucharest, Romania
- Education: University of Bucharest
- Occupations: writer; novelist; politician
- Years active: 1942–1979
- Era: Post-WWII era
- Notable work: Moromeții (The Moromete Family); Cel mai iubit dintre pământeni (The Most Beloved of Earthlings)
- Spouses: Aurora Cornu (m. 1955; div. 1959) Eta Wexler (m. 1960; div. 1966) Elena Mitev (m. 1968)
- Children: 2

Marin Preda (Romanian pronunciation: [maˈrin ˈpreda]; 5 August 1922, Siliștea Gumești, Teleorman County, Kingdom of Romania – 16 May 1980, Mogoșoaia, Ilfov County], Socialist Republic of Romania) was a Romanian novelist, post-war writer and director of Cartea Românească publishing house. He is considered by some to be the most important novelist in post-World War II Romanian literature. However, he has also garnered an ambivalent perception in post-socialist Romania: Preda's final novel, Cel mai iubit dintre pământeni ("The Most Beloved of Earthlings"), published just a couple of months before his death, is a daring critique of the beginnings of communism in Romania; in contrast, Preda was well-regarded by party leaders and received high distinctions in socialist Romania, and did not position himself as an open opponent of the regime. At the time of his death, Marin Preda was a member of the Great National Assembly.

== Biography ==
=== Childhood ===
Preda was born in Teleorman County in a village called Siliștea Gumești, the son of Tudor Călărașu, a ploughman, and Joița Preda. He legally bore his mother's name, as his parents were not legally married due to the fact that Joița was a war widow, and a second marriage would annul her pension.

Joița had two daughters from her first marriage: Măria (nicknamed Alboaica) and Mița (Tita). Tudor Călărașu was also a widower and had three sons from his first marriage: Ilie (Paraschiv), Gheorghe (Achim) and Ion (Nilă). In the family of the two spouses were also born: Ilinca, Marin and Alexandru (Sae).

Marin Preda spent his childhood in this large and rural family, which — despite owning two plots of land — did not have financial security.

=== Education ===
In September 1929, the teacher Ionel Teodorescu enrolled Marin Preda in the first grade, but Preda's father did not let him attend, as he usually enrolled his children only at the age of 8. The following year, Preda was re-enrolled in the first grade in his native village. Due to the family's rural lifestyle, Preda participated in agricultural work at home, which meant that he was often absent from school. Gradually, however, he proved to be among the best students in his grade and was awarded for his academic success (this childhood scene was later evoked in his novel Moromeții).

The year 1933–1934 (4th grade) was one of the hardest in the student's life: his father could no longer buy textbooks and came down with malaria. Due to the intervention of a teacher, Preda was lent books and was able to complete the school year. When he could not find school supplies in his village, he borrowed textbooks from the neighbouring communes. With repeated pleas and insistence, he obtained a promise from his mother that she would convince his father to send him to a teaching academy.

Between 1934 and 1937 he attended grades five to seven, being taught by Ion Georgescu from the neighbouring village of Balaci. The teacher would remember in his old age that the student Marin Preda "was a dreamer in the classroom", but that "he did well in writing", and that on a given topic about the Union of Principalities Preda did "sensational work".

He finished 7th grade with an overall average of 9.78. Preda's final graduating exam was taken at the Central School in Ciolănești (a commune ten kilometres away from Siliștea Gumești). On 18 June, Preda was issued graduation certificate no. 71, with a general average of 9.15 in all classes.

=== Leaving his native village ===
In 1937, avoiding the Teacher Training School in Alexandria, where the fees were too high, Preda instead sought to attend school in Câmpulung-Muscel, but was rejected at the medical examination due to myopia. His father then tried to send him to a trade school; however, a librarian, Constantin Păun from Miroși, intervened and sent Preda to school in Abrud, where he received a successful grade of 10 in the scholarship examination. Preda soon integrated into daily life at a pedagogical institute. The teachers were satisfied with him, and he got along well with his Transylvanian colleagues; in 1939 he spent the winter holiday with a colleague from Abrud.

In the autumn of 1939 he was transferred to a school in Cristur-Odorhei, where he continued his studies for another year. As with Abrud, he showed a special interest in history, Romanian, and mathematics. At the meetings of the Literary Society in the school, he was noticed by the teacher Justin Salanțiu, who predicted that "he will become a great writer". While in the Literary Society, he wrote and read some short sketches, which were chosen for publication in his school's literary magazine; however, due to changing political circumstances in Romania, the magazine shut down, and his writings went unpublished. The three years of Transylvanian life were later evoked in the semi-autobiographical novel Viața ca o pradă ("Life as Prey") and in Cel mai iubit dintre pământeni ("The Most Beloved of Earthlings"). In 1940, following the Second Vienna Award, which transferred parts of Transylvania to Hungary, Preda began to attend school in Bucharest.

In January 1941, he witnessed the turbulent events of the Legionary Rebellion and its repression by Ion Antonescu. He kept contact with Transylvanian refugees and met with soldiers settled in Bucharest. Three decades later, he would recount these events in Viața ca o pradă and Delirul ("The Delirium").

At the end of the 1940–1941 school year, with the help of the school's headmaster, he took the skills examination, but due to material difficulties he dropped out of school.

During the summer, Preda did not return to his native village: "I had the impression that if I return, I will not be able to leave." He had failed to publish anything and had not even found a job; Marin Preda found it increasingly difficult: "It is impossible for me to remember and understand how I was able to live, from what sources, all autumn and all winter of 1941 -1942. Only unrelated, unnatural things ... I had nowhere to sleep, there was sleet all over Bucharest, and I walked non-stop by tram from Gara de Nord to Gara de Est. All day and all night."

In the collected volume of poems Sârmă ghimpată ("Barbed Wire"), Romanian poet Geo Dumitrescu intended to include Preda's poem, "The Return of the Wandering Son", but the collection was banned from print. In 1941, also through Geo Dumitrescu, Preda was hired as a proofreader for the newspaper Timpul.

== Literary activity ==
In April 1942, Preda made his publishing debut with the sketch "Părlitu" ("Burnt") in the newspaper Timpul, endorsed by the poet Miron Radu Paraschivescu. His debut at the age of 20 gave him confidence in his writing, and he continued to publish sketches and stories, including "Strigoaica" ("The Undead"), "Salcâmul" ("The Acacia"), "Calul" ("The Horse"), "Noaptea" ("The Night"), and "La câmp" ("In the Field").

In September, Preda resigned from his proofreading position at Timpul. For a short time he was a civil servant at the Institute of Statistics. On the recommendation of critic Eugen Lovinescu, the poet Ion Vinea hired him as editorial secretary at the newspaper Evenimentul zilei ("Today's Event").

In March 1943, he wrote a column for the newspaper Vremea războiului ("The Time of War"). That April, Evenimentul zilei published his sketch "Rotila". Preda took part in several meetings of the Sburătorul ("The Flier") literary circle, led by Eugen Lovinescu, where his short story "Calul" produced a vivid impression, arousing the delight of Dinu Nicodin, who purchased the manuscript for a large sum of money. The short story was included in Preda's debut volume, Întâlnirea din pământuri ("The Meeting between the Lands"), published in 1948. The volume hinted at Preda's defining use of autobiographical, "fly on the wall" narratives: in the eponymous short story, critics immediately recognized the author's father, who would also appear with a changed name in Moromeții.

Between 1943 and 1945 he served in the Romanian Army, an experience he would describe in his later works. In 1945 he became a proofreader for the newspaper România liberă ("Free Romania").

Between 1949 and 1955, he wrote the first volume of the novel Moromeții, which would later be considered his defining work.

In 1952, he became editor of the magazine Viaţa Românească ("Romanian Life"). In 1956 he received the State Prize for Literature for the novel Moromeții. A year later, in 1957, Preda travelled to Vietnam and Beijing, China.

Between 1960 and 1961 he read widely, and undertook translations of foreign literature into Romanian. Preda became fascinated by William Faulkner, with whom his prose has certain affinities. In 1965, he and his wife Eta translated the novel The Plague by Albert Camus into Romanian. In 1968 he was elected the vice president of the Romanian Writers' Union, and in 1970 he became director of the Cartea Românească ("Romanian Book") publishing house, which he led until his sudden death in 1980. In 1970 he translated Fyodor Dostoevsky's novel Demons in collaboration with Nicolae Gane. Preda's novel, Marele singuratic ("The Great Lonely One"), received the Writers' Union Award in 1971.

Preda's 1975 novel Delirul ("Delirium") reflects an attempt to reconsider Ion Antonescu's role in Romanian history, against the background of resurgent nationalist pride in socialist Romania. Here, Antonescu is painted as a tragic figure who collaborated with Nazi Germany due to his belief that this was the only way to regain Bessarabia. The first edition of the novel quickly sold out.

He became a corresponding member of the Romanian Academy in 1974, and was promoted to titular post-mortem member in 1990.

The second edition of the novel "Marele singuratic" appeared in 1976, and in 1977 he published "Viața ca o pradă" (Life as a Prey), a comprehensive autobiographical novel whose main theme is the crystallization of an artist's conscience.

In 1980, Marin Preda published his last novel, Cel mai iubit dintre pământeni ("The Most Beloved of Earthlings"), regarded as a violent critique of communism. After a few short weeks on the market, the novel was withdrawn from all public, university, and school libraries, as well as all bookshops.

An eyewitness stated that in 1970, Preda had told President Nicolae Ceaușescu: "If you want to introduce socialist realism, I, Marin Preda, will commit suicide." But the author had never publicly criticized socialist realism and never doubted the legitimacy of the communist regime.

== Personal life ==
In 1955, Preda married the poet Aurora Cornu. Their love letters were published posthumously. They divorced in 1959.

He then married Eta Vexler, who later immigrated to France in the early 1970s, ending their marriage.

Preda married a third time, to Elena Mitev. The couple had two sons, Nicolae and Alexandru.

Between 1975 and 1980, he lived in Bucharest at Strada Pictor Alexandru Romano no. 21; the home now displays a plaque dedicated to the author.

== Awards ==
In 1971, Preda was awarded the Order of the Star of the Romanian Socialist Republic, 2nd class "for special merits in the work of building socialism, on the occasion of the 50th anniversary of the Romanian Communist Party establishment".

Preda's novel Moromeții was awarded the State Prize for Literature in 1956.

== Death ==
On 16 May 1980, Preda died suddenly at the Writers' Mansion of Mogoșoaia Palace. The autopsy, which took place 24 hours after his death, showed that his blood alcohol concentration was 3.5 BAC, enough to fall into a coma. The official cause of death was asphixiation.

His family maintains that his sudden death was related to the publication of the novel Cel mai iubit dintre pământeni and occurred in suspicious circumstances. According to the forensic report, "Marin Preda's death was violent and was due to mechanical asphyxia by clogging the airways with a soft object, possibly a bed linen, in an alcoholic coma". Marin Preda was buried in the Writers' Alley in Bellu Cemetery.

== Tributes to Marin Preda ==
- A lyceum of Bucharest is called after his name, Liceul Teoretic "Marin Preda".
- A lyceum of Odorheiu Secuiesc is called after his name, Liceul "Marin Preda".
- A lyceum of Turnu Măgurele is called after his name, Liceul "Marin Preda".
- A branch of the Bucharest Metropolitan Library bears his name, Marin Preda Branch.
- A street in Cluj-Napoca bears his name, Marin Preda Street.
- A street in Turda is named after him, Marin Preda Street.
- A street in Oradea is named after him, Marin Preda Street.
- A street in Mangalia is named after him, Marin Preda Street.
- A street in Râmnicu Vâlcea bears his name, Marin Preda Street.

On 10 August 2012, to commemorate the occasion of the 90th anniversary of Marin Preda's birth, the National Bank of Romania put into circulation a commemorative silver coin with a face value of 10 lei. The coin was issued in a circulation of 500 copies.

== Selective list of works ==
- 1948 – Întâlnirea din pământuri ("The Meeting of the Lands")
- 1949 – Ana Roșculeț
- 1952 – Desfăşurarea ("The Unfolding")
- 1955 – Moromeții ("The Moromete Family")
- 1956 – Ferestre întunecate ("Dark Windows")
- 1959 – Îndrăzneala ("The Daring")
- 1962 – Risipitorii ("The Prodigals")
- 1967 – Moromeții, second part
- 1968 – Intrusul ("The Intruder")
- 1972 – Imposibila întoarcere ("The Impossible Return")
- 1972 – Marele singuratic ("The Great Loner")
- 1973 – Întâlnirea din pământuri, second edition
- 1975 – Delirul ("The Delirium")
- 1977 – Viața ca o pradă ("Life as a Prey")
- 1980 – Cel mai iubit dintre pământeni ("The Most Beloved of Earthlings")

== Translations of Preda's work ==
- Dans un village: nouvelle (Desfășurarea), translation into the French language by Ana Vifor, 1955
- L'horizon bleu de la mort, translation into French language by Micaela Slăvescu, 1982
- Le Grand solitaire (Marele singuratic), translation into French language by Claude B. Levenson, 1975
- L'intrus (Intrusul), translation into French language by Maria Ivănescu, foreword by Cezar Ivănescu,1982
- Les Moromete (Moromeții), translation into French language by Maria Ivănescu, foreword by Mihai Ungheanu, 1986

== See also ==
- List of unsolved deaths
- Romanian literature
